= The Haunted discography =

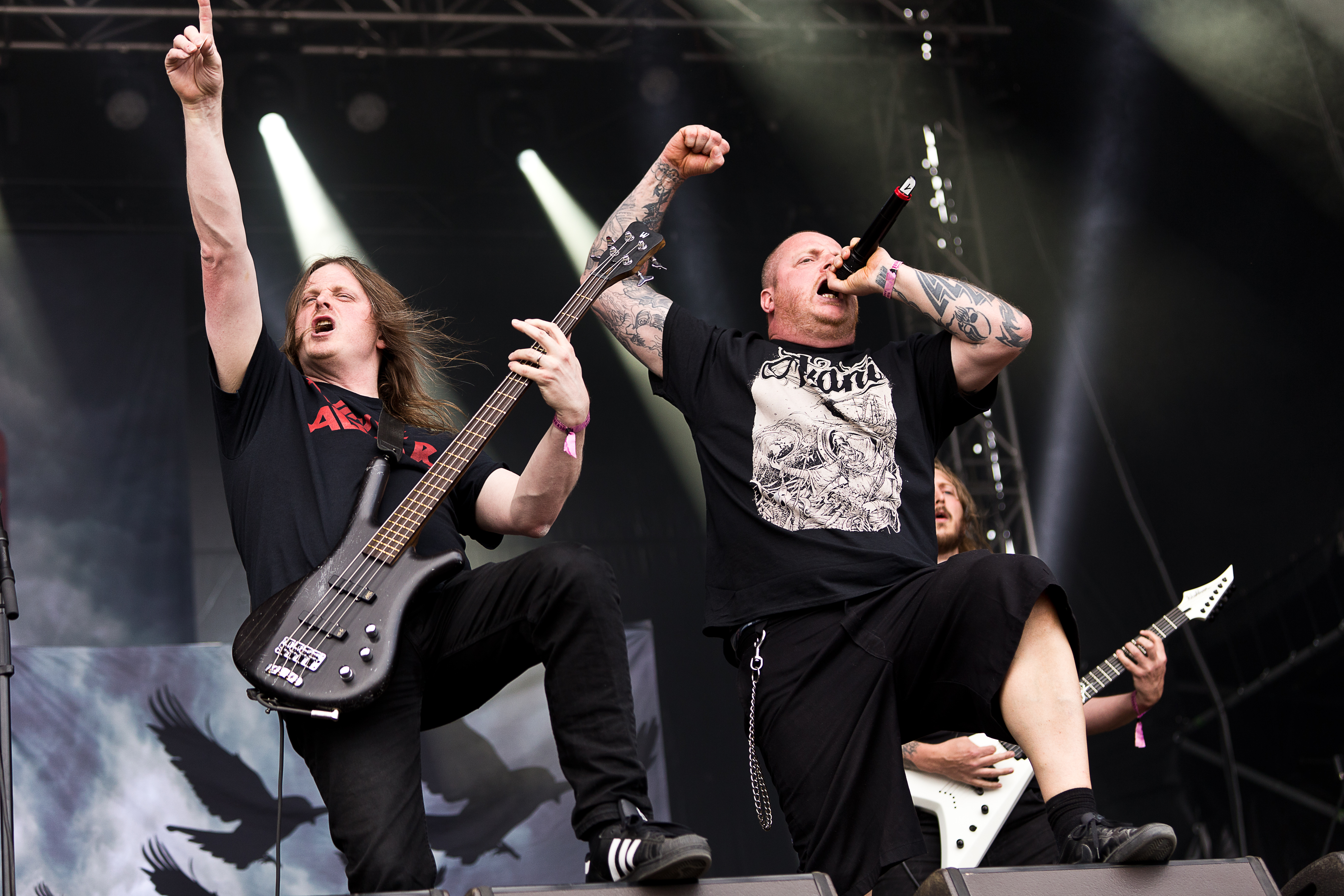
- Studio albums: 10
- Live albums: 2
- Compilation albums: 1
- Video albums: 2
- Music videos: 11

This following is the discography for Swedish heavy metal band the Haunted.

== Albums ==
=== Studio albums ===
Title	Album details	Peak chart positions								Sales
Title	Album details	SWE	FIN	FRA	GER	JPN	SWI	US Heat.	US Ind.	Sales
The Haunted	Released: 23 June 1998; Label: Earache Records; Formats: CD, digital download	—	—	—	—	—	—	—	—	
Made Me Do It	Released: 31 October 2000; Label: Earache Records; Formats: CD, CD+DVD, LP, digital download	—	—	—	—	94	—	—	—	US: 14,658+
One Kill Wonder	Released: 25 February 2003; Label: Earache Records; Formats: CD, LP, digital download	23	—	—	—	70	—	—	45	
rEVOLVEr	Released: 19 October 2004; Label: Century Media Records; Formats: CD, LP, digital download	18	—	—	—	85	—	50	40	US: 2,890+
The Dead Eye	Released: 31 October 2006; Label: Century Media Records; Formats: CD, CD+DVD, LP, digital download	14	—	—	—	94	—	18	38	US: 3,200+
Versus	Released: 14 October 2008; Label: Century Media Records; Formats: CD, LP, digital download	14	12	198	—	101	—	24	—	US: 1,600+
Unseen	Released: 29 March 2011; Label: Century Media Records; Formats: CD, digital download	5	26	—	—	182	—	33	—	US: 1,200+
Exit Wounds	Released: 2 September 2014; Label: Century Media Records; Formats: CD, LP, digital download	32	15	—	64	135	100	5	35	US: 3,300+
Strength in Numbers	Released: 25 August 2017; Label: Century Media Records; Formats: CD, LP, digital download	25	32	—	49	128	65	25	—	
Songs of Last Resort	Released: 30 May 2025; Label: Century Media Records; Formats: CD, LP, digital download	11	—	—	83	—	40	—	—	
"—" denotes a recording that did not chart or was not released in that territory.

=== Live albums ===
Title	Album details	Peak chart positions	Sales
Title	Album details	SWE	Sales
Live Rounds In Tokyo	Released: 10 December 2001; Label: Earache Records; Formats: CD, digital download	—	US: 3,139+
Road Kill	Released: 21 April 2010; Label: Century Media Records; Formats: CD, digital download	29	
"—" denotes a recording that did not chart or was not released in that territory.

=== Compilation albums ===
Title	Album details
Warning Shots	Released 9 March 2009; Label: Earache Records; Formats: CD, digital download

== Videos ==
=== Video albums ===
Title	Album details	Peak chart positions
Title	Album details	FIN
Caught on Tape	Released: 11 March 2002; Label: Earache Records; Formats: DVD	—
Road Kill	Released: 19 April 2010; Label: Century Media Records; Formats: DVD	1
"—" denotes a recording that did not chart or was not released in that territory.

=== Music videos ===
Year	Title	Directed	Album
2000	"Bury Your Dead"	—	Made Me Do It
2003	"D.O.A."	Pete Bridgewater	One Kill Wonder
2004	"All Against All"	Roger Johansson	rEVOLVEr
2005	"No Compromise"	Roger Johansson	rEVOLVEr
2006	"The Flood"	Roger Johansson	The Dead Eye
2007	"The Drowning"	Anders Björler	The Dead Eye
2008	"Moronic Colossus"	Anders Björler	Versus
2008	"Trenches"	Daniel Larsson	Versus
2011	"No Ghost"	Marcel Schleiff, Anders Björler	Unseen
2014	"Eye of the Storm"	—	Exit Wounds
2014	"Cutting Teeth"	Jakob Arevarn	Exit Wounds
2017	"Brute Force"	Oscar Dziedziela	Strength In Numbers
2017	"Spark"	Oscar Dziedziela	Strength In Numbers
2017	"Preachers of Death"	Oscar Dziedziela	Strength In Numbers
