= Road Kill (The Haunted album) =

Live album by The Haunted
- Released: 21 April 2010
- Recorded: 13 February 2009 (live tracks); 1–14 April 2008 (studio tracks)
- Genre: Thrash metal, melodic death metal
- Length: 73:29
- Label: Century Media

The Haunted chronology
Warning Shots (2009)	Road Kill (2010)	Unseen (2011)

Road Kill is the second live album by Swedish heavy metal band The Haunted, released on 21 April 2010. The live tracks were recorded at Melkweg, Amsterdam on 13 February 2009. The studio bonus tracks were recorded during the Versus sessions, 1–14 April 2008

== Track listing ==
1. "Little Cage" – 3:05
2. "The Drowning" – 4:15
3. "Trespass" – 3:40
4. "The Premonition" – 0:48
5. "The Flood" – 3:42
6. "The Medication" – 4:47
7. "Moronic Colossus" – 3:45
8. "D.O.A." – 4:19
9. "All Against All" – 6:18
10. "In Vein" – 3:54
11. "Trenches" – 3:58
12. "Dark Intentions" – 1:24
13. "Bury Your Dead" – 3:17
14. "Faultline" – 3:50
15. "99" – 4:42
16. "Hate Song" – 3:19
17. "Sacrifice" – 4:44* (music: A. Björler / J. Björler)
18. "Meat Wagon" – 3:05* (music: Dolving)
19. "Walk on Water" – 3:27* (music: A. Björler)
20. "Seize the Day" – 2:11* (music: Jensen)
21. "Infernalis Mundi" – 0:44* (music: Dolving)

* Studio bonus tracks

== Credits ==
- Peter Dolving – vocals
- Patrik Jensen – guitars
- Anders Björler – guitars
- Jonas Björler – bass
- Per Möller Jensen – drums
