= Mary Beats Jane =

Swedish metal band

Mary Beats Jane, 1994

Mary Beats Jane was a Swedish metal band from Gothenburg. Their self-titled 1994 album won a Swedish Grammy in 1995. Singer Peter Dolving, who went on to join the Haunted around 1997, has said the band is dead and won't be making any more music.

Paul Stenning was a very outspoken supporter of the band, and shared rare tracks online with fans during the early 2000s. He stated in an interview with Dolving (and Anders Björler) with Terrorizer in 2004 that their 1994 debut album is "one of the greatest and most underrated metal albums of all time" and the follow-up is also a "cult classic". Stenning also stated they are the best band he ever saw live.

== Members ==
- Peter Dolving – vocals
- Urban Olsson – guitar
- Magnus Nyberg – guitar
- Bjarne Olsson – bass
- Peter Asp – drums

== Discography ==
- 1994 – Mary Beats Jane
- 1997 – Locust
