= Live Rounds in Tokyo =

Live Rounds In Tokyo

Live album by The Haunted
- Released: 10 December 2001
- Recorded: Akasaka Blitz, Tokyo, Japan; 16 November 2000
- Genre: Thrash metal, melodic death metal
- Length: 53:48
- Label: Earache
- Producer: Berno Paulsson, The Haunted

The Haunted chronology
Made Me Do It (2000)	Live Rounds In Tokyo (2001)	One Kill Wonder (2003)

Live Rounds in Tokyo is the first live album by Swedish heavy metal band The Haunted, released in 2001. It was issued with their previous release The Haunted Made Me Do It. The Japanese version of the album excludes the song "Eclipse", as it was on their version of The Haunted Made Me Do It; instead right before "Hate Song" is "Blinded by Fear", which is an At the Gates cover, also making "Hate Song" the final track of that version.

== Track listing ==
No.	Title	Length
1.	"Intro"	1:30
2.	"Dark Intentions"	3:07
3.	"Bury Your Dead"	3:40
4.	"Chasm"	4:37
5.	"Trespass"	4:10
6.	"Shattered"	1:34
7.	"Hollow Ground"	4:08
8.	"Chokehold"	2:59
9.	"Leech"	3:03
10.	"In Vein"	4:13
11.	"Revelation"	2:55
12.	"Bullethole"	4:10
13.	"Silencer"	1:34
14.	"Three Times"	4:08
15.	"Undead"	2:59
16.	"Hate Song"	3:03
17.	"Eclipse"	4:13

== Tracks ==
- Tracks 2, 3, 5, 7, 9, 11 & 13 from The Haunted Made Me Do It and track 17 is a studio track originally in the reissue of that album
- Tracks 4, 6, 8, 10, 12 & 14–16 from The Haunted

== Personnel ==
- Marco Aro – vocals
- Anders Björler – guitar
- Patrik Jensen – guitar
- Jonas Björler – bass
- Per Möller Jensen – drums
