= Warning Shot =

Warning Shot may refer to:

- Warning shot, a harmless artillery shot or gunshot used for warning
- Warning Shots, a compilation album by The Haunted
- Warning Shot (1967 film), a drama by Buzz Kulik
- Warning Shot (2018 film), an American drama thriller
- "Warning Shots" (The Offer), a 2022 television episode
- "Warning Shot", a song by Status Quo from the album Rock 'til You Drop
