= The Haunted (album) =

Studio album by The Haunted
- Released: 23 June 1998
- Recorded: November–December 1997
- Studio: Studio Fredman
- Genres: Thrash metal, melodic death metal
- Length: 40:46
- Label: Earache
- Producer: Fredrik Nordström

The Haunted chronology
The Haunted (1998)	The Haunted Made Me Do It (2000)

Professional ratings
Review scores
Source	Rating
Scream Magazine	4/6

The Haunted is the debut studio album by Swedish heavy metal band The Haunted, released in 1998 on Earache Records. Tracks 1–4 and 12 were part of the band's greatest hits album, Warning Shots. Peter Dolving and Adrian Erlandsson both quit at different times after the album, but both returned on different releases, with Dolving on rEVOLVEr, and Erlandsson on Exit Wounds.

== Track listing ==
No.	Title	Lyrics	Music	Length
1.	"Hate Song"	Jensen/Dolving	Jensen	2:59
2.	"Chasm"	Dolving	A. Björler	3:09
3.	"In Vein"	Jensen/Dolving	J. Björler/Jensen	3:23
4.	"Undead"	Jensen	Jensen	2:08
5.	"Choke Hold"	Dolving/A. Björler	Jensen/J. Björler	3:43
6.	"Three Times"	Dolving	Jensen	2:41
7.	"Bullet Hole"	The Haunted	A. Björler	4:17
8.	"Now You Know"	Dolving	Björlers	3:30
9.	"Shattered"	Jensen	Jensen/A. Björler	3:17
10.	"Soul Fracture"	Björlers	A. Björler	3:44
11.	"Blood Rust"	Jensen	Jensen/A. Björler	3:40
12.	"Forensick"	Dolving	Jensen/Björlers	4:16

Reissue bonus track
No.	Title	Length
13.	"Burner"	3:36
14.	"I'll Be Damned"	3:55

== Personnel ==
The Haunted

- Peter Dolving ― vocals
- Anders Björler ― guitar
- Patrik Jensen ― guitar
- Jonas Björler ― bass
- Adrian Erlandsson ― drums
