= Peter Dolving =

Swedish singer

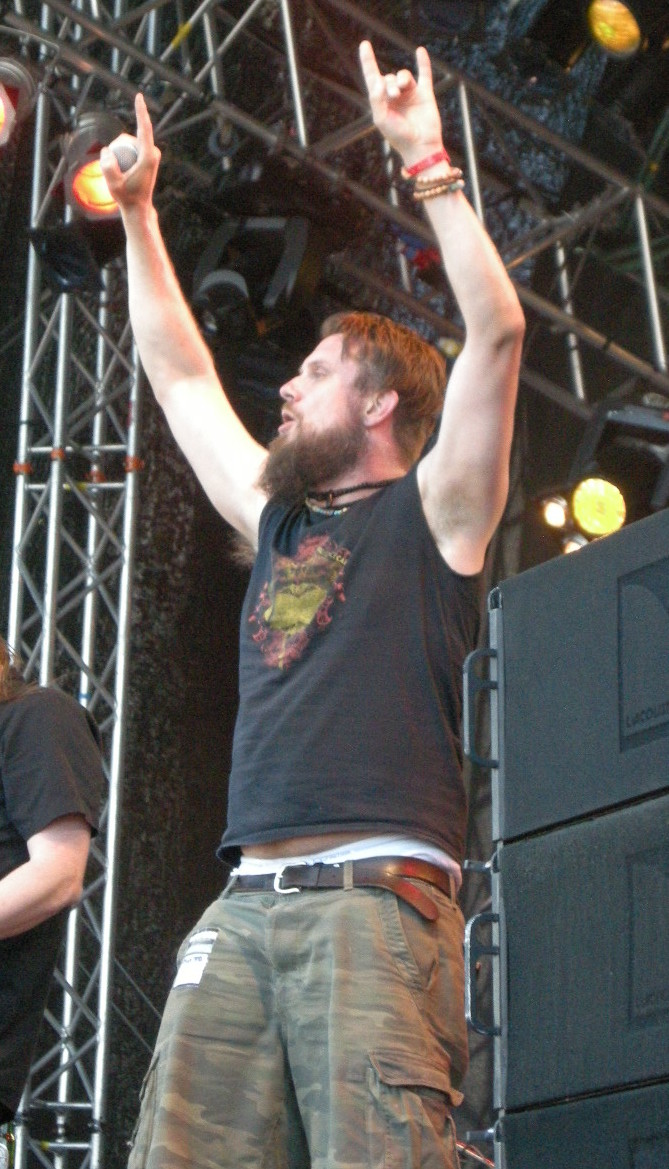
- Dolving in 2009

Background information
- Born: 24 October 1969 (age 55); Gothenburg, Sweden
- Origin: Delsbo, Sweden
- Genres: Thrash metal; melodic death metal; groove metal
- Occupations: Singer; songwriter
- Years active: 1993–present
- Formerly of: The Haunted; Mary Beats Jane

Peter Dolving (born 24 October 1969) is a Swedish vocalist now living in Salvador, Bahia, Brazil. He is best known as the former frontman of the heavy metal band The Haunted.

== Career ==
Dolving began as a singer-songwriter playing in cafes in Sweden. He joined the band Mary Beats Jane and organized raves to support himself. He then opened the highly successful rock club called "Underground" in the basement of the restaurant Kompaniet in Gothenburg. Mary Beats Jane released their first album in 1994 and toured through 1997. Dolving has said Mary Beats Jane will never re-form.

Dolving then joined Swedish heavy metal band The Haunted in 1997 with former members of At The Gates (at the time they were experimenting with the name Death & 1/2 Prod.), supporting himself by drawing fetish art and working as a carpenter. He left The Haunted after the first album, then returned in 2004 on the album rEVOLVEr. He eventually formed The Peter Dolving Band to perform his own songs and wrote spoken-word material for the short film No Justice No Peace by Jonas Olsen. The Peter Dolving Band no longer exists, with that style of music taken up by his BringTheWarHome project. Dolving incited the wrath of some metal fans with his unique soul-searching and frequent ranting in the Blog section of his official MySpace page. A candid interview with him appears in the documentary Working Class Rock Star. In 2011 Dolving joined the Swedish hardcore band Rosvo.

Dolving has resumed work on musical project entitled "O" with Scott Reeder.

== Personal life ==
Dolving has in several interviews stated that he considers himself an anarchist.

== Albums ==
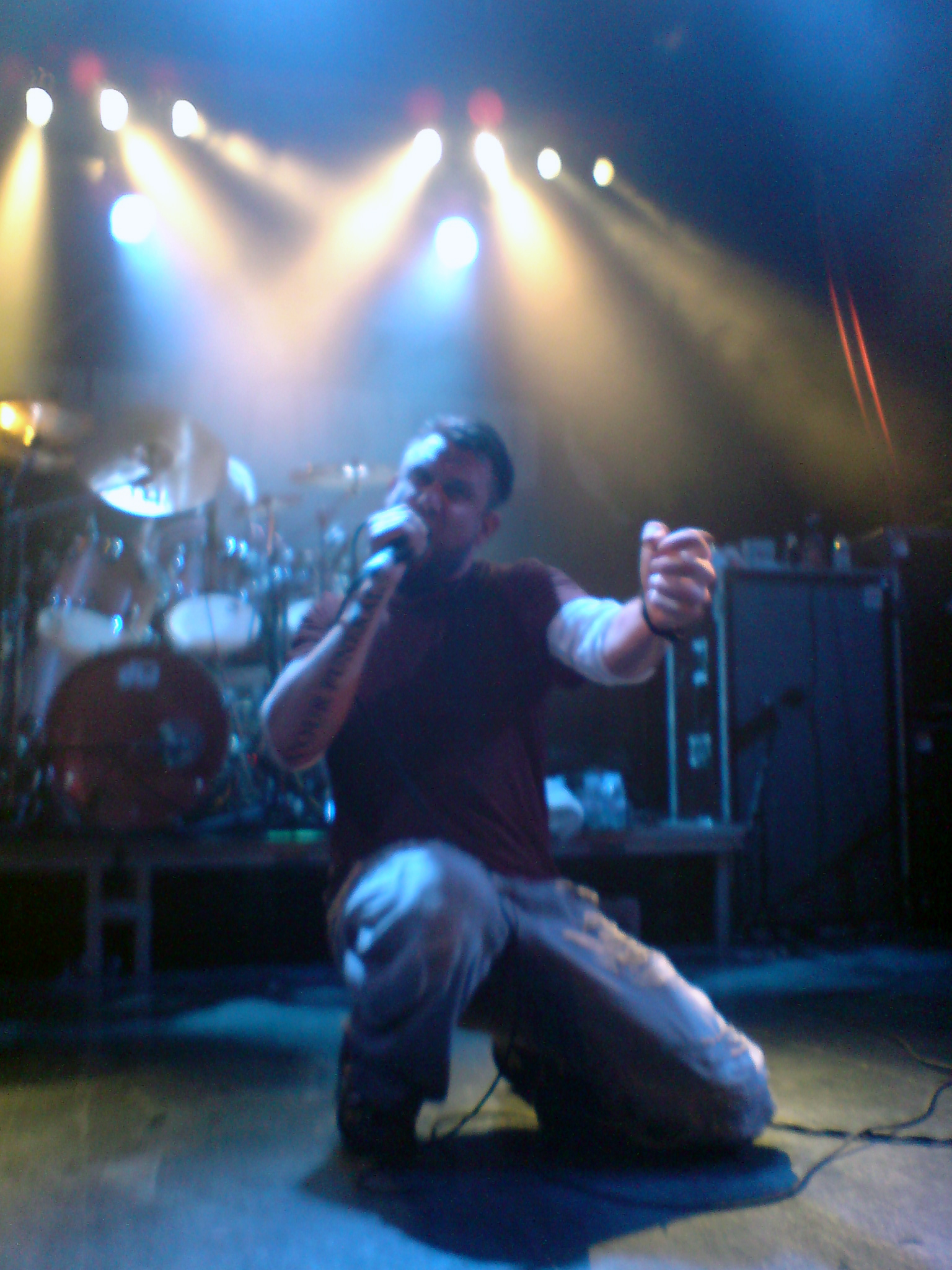
Dolving during a live performance in Barcelona in 2009

=== Mary Beats Jane ===
- Mary Beats Jane (1994)
- Locust (1996)

=== The Haunted ===
- The Haunted (1998)
- Revolver (2004)
- The Dead Eye (2006)
- Versus (2008)
- Road Kill (2010)
- Unseen (2011)

=== Solo a.k.a. PeterDolvingBand a.k.a. BringTheWarHome ===
- Just 'cause you can talk, don't mean I have to listen (2000) re-released in (2011)
- One of Us (2001)
- Bad Blood (2003)
- Rejoice! (2008) LP by BringTheWarHome (2005)
- Thieves & Liars (2013) LP by Peter Dolving (Deadlight Entertainment)

=== Syntacks ===
- Syntax error (2013) LP by Syntacks

=== Gusto ===
- Gusto! (2001) LP by Gusto! (SwingKids)
- Pater Familias ( ? ) LP by Gusto! (SwingKids)

=== IAmFire ===
- Eyes Wide Open (2015) EP by Iamfire (Deadlight Entertainment)
- From Ashes (2017) LP by Iamfire (TheNorthIsColdIAmFire)

=== Science ===
- Weird Science (unreleased) LP by Science

=== Rosvo ===
- Ticks & Ants (2011) EP by Rosvo (Rosvo)

=== Other releases ===
- Spell (2014) Single by Line Blood (Vocal Feature)
- Trash It Up (2003) by the band Set My Path (Contributed vocals on the track Shine)
- Satellite Bay (2007) by Long Distance Calling (Contributed vocals on the track Built Without Hands)
- Warning (2008) EP by ColdTears (Contributed vocals on the track No Ordinary Ghost)
- Banisher of the Light (2008) by the band Sparzanza (Contributed vocals on the track Dead Rising)
