= Songs of Last Resort =

Studio album by the Haunted
- Released: 30 May 2025
- Studios: Studio Bohus (Kungälv, Sweden)
- Genres: Thrash metal, melodic death metal, groove metal
- Length: 40:25
- Label: Century Media
- Producer: Jens Bogren

The Haunted chronology
Strength in Numbers (2017)	Songs of Last Resort (2025)

Singles from Songs of Last Resort
- 1. "Warhead" Released: 21 March 2025; 2. "In Fire Reborn" Released: 30 April 2025

Songs of Last Resort is the tenth studio album by Swedish heavy metal band the Haunted. The album was released on 30 May 2025 through Century Media Records. The nearly eight years since Strength in Numbers makes it the longest gap between studio albums in the band's career.

== Background and promotion ==
On 7 August 2022, Ola Englund announced on his YouTube channel that the Haunted were preparing to write a new album. By August 2024, The band were in the studio working on their tenth studio album, with drummer Adrian Erlandsson confirming that he was "working on drums" for it.

On 21 March 2025, the Haunted announced the name of their tenth studio album, "Songs of Last Resort". On the same day, they released the album's lead single "Warhead" and its music video, which was also the band's first single in eight years. On 30 April 2025, the Haunted released the second single, "In Fire Reborn". On 30 May, they released the official video for "Death to the Crown", coinciding with the album release.

== Critical reception ==
Professional ratings
Review scores
Source	Rating
Blabbermouth.net	(8/10)
Distorted Sound	(9/10)

The album was met with positive reviews. Blabbermouth.net rated it with a score of 8.5 and described it as a "fabulous return to top form". Dan McHugh of Distorted Sound scored the album 9 out of 10 and praised the album for "breathing new life into the band."

== Track listing ==
Songs of Last Resort track listing
No.	Title	Lyrics	Music	Length
1.	"Warhead"	Patrik Jensen	Jensen	3:39
2.	"In Fire Reborn"	The Haunted	Jonas Björler; Jensen	3:18
3.	"Death to the Crown"	Marco Aro	Ola Englund	2:56
4.	"To Bleed Out"	Jensen	Jensen	4:29
5.	"Unbound"	The Haunted	Björler	3:34
6.	"Hell Is Wasted on the Dead"	Jensen	Jensen	2:53
7.	"Through the Fire"	Englund	Englund	3:01
8.	"Collateral Carnage"	Englund	Englund	4:01
9.	"Blood Clots"	The Haunted	Englund	1:03
10.	"Salvation Recalled"	Björler	The Haunted	3:26
11.	"Labyrinth of Lies"	Englund	Englund	3:30
12.	"Letters of Last Resort"	Jensen	Jensen	4:06
Total length:				40:25

== Personnel ==
Credits adapted from Tidal.

=== The Haunted ===
- Marco Aro – vocals
- Patrik Jensen – guitar
- Ola Englund – guitar
- Jonas Björler – bass, background vocals
- Adrian Erlandsson – drums

=== Additional contributors ===
- Jens Bogren – production, mastering, mixing
- Oscar Nilsson – engineering
- Björn Strid – vocals on "To Bleed Out"

== Charts ==
Chart performance for Songs of Last Resort
Chart (2025)	Peak position
Austrian Albums (Ö3 Austria)	49
Belgian Albums (Ultratop Flanders)	129
French Rock & Metal Albums (SNEP)	28
German Albums (Offizielle Top 100)	83
Japanese International Albums (Oricon)	14
Swedish Albums (Sverigetopplistan)	11
Swedish Hard Rock Albums (Sverigetopplistan)	2
Swiss Albums (Schweizer Hitparade)	40
UK Album Downloads (Official Charts)	81
UK Albums Sales (OCC)	94
UK Rock & Metal Albums (Official Charts)	10
