= Strength in Numbers (The Haunted album) =

Studio album by The Haunted
- Released: 25 August 2017
- Recorded: March−May 2017
- Studio: Parlour Studios in Kettering, England
- Genre: Thrash metal, melodic death metal, groove metal
- Length: 38:00
- Label: Century Media
- Producer: Russ Russell

The Haunted chronology
Exit Wounds (2014)	Strength in Numbers (2017)	Songs of Last Resort (2025)

Singles from Strength in Numbers
- 1. "Brute Force" Released: 23 June 2017; 2. "Spark" Released: 21 July 2017; 3. "Preachers of Death" Released: 18 August 2017

Professional ratings
Review scores
Source	Rating
All About the Rock	8/10 stars
AllMusic	3/5 stars
Metal Hammer	4/5 stars
Sputnikmusic	3.5/5 stars

Strength in Numbers is the ninth studio album by Swedish heavy metal band The Haunted, released on 25 August 2017 via Century Media.

== Track listing ==
No.	Title	Lyrics	Music	Length
1.	"Fill the Darkness with Black" (instrumental)		Ola Englund	1:24
2.	"Brute Force"	Marco Aro	Englund	2:48
3.	"Spark"	Aro	Jonas Björler; Englund	4:21
4.	"Preachers of Death"	Björler	Englund	4:55
5.	"Strength in Numbers"	Björler; Aro	Björler; Englund	4:38
6.	"Tighten the Noose"	Aro	Patrik Jensen	3:00
7.	"This Is the End"	Björler	Björler; Jensen	3:29
8.	"The Fall"	Björler	Björler; Englund	4:32
9.	"Means to an End"	Aro	Björler; Englund	4:25
10.	"Monuments"	Björler; Englund	Englund	4:28
Total length:				38:00

Digipak edition bonus tracks
No.	Title	Lyrics	Music	Length
11.	"Illusions"	Aro	Björler; Jensen	3:33
12.	"Sinister"	Aro	Jensen	4:05
Total length:				45:38

Japanese edition bonus tracks
No.	Title	Lyrics	Music	Length
11.	"Illusions"	Aro	Björler; Jensen	3:33
12.	"Sinister"	Aro	Jensen	4:05
13.	"Shackles"	Aro	Englund	4:12
Total length:				49:50

== Personnel ==
Credits are adapted from the album's liner notes.

The Haunted

- Marco Aro – vocals
- Patrik Jensen – guitar
- Ola Englund – lead guitar
- Jonas Björler – bass
- Adrian Erlandsson – drums

Production and design

- Russ Russell − production, engineering, mixing, mastering
- Jocke Skog − producer (vocals)
- Andreas Pettersson − artwork
- Nilay Pavlovic − photography
