= Unseen (The Haunted album) =

Studio album by The Haunted
- Released: 16 March 2011 (Sweden)
- Recorded: 18 October; 6 November 2010 at Antfarm Studio, Aarhus, Denmark
- Genres: Groove metal, alternative metal, melodic death metal
- Length: 42:21
- Label: Century Media
- Producer: Tue Madsen

The Haunted chronology
Versus (2008)	Unseen (2011)	Exit Wounds (2014)

Professional ratings
Review scores
Source	Rating
Heavy Blog Is Heavy	3/5 stars
Thrash Hits	2/6 stars

Unseen is the seventh studio album by Swedish heavy metal band The Haunted, released on 16 March 2011. The album experiments with a more rock-influenced alternative metal sound mixed with their usual groove metal and melodic death metal sound.

While creating the album, vocalist Peter Dolving, in an interview, predicted, "It's going to be epic. Danceable. Groovy. And very very arty farty metal. With this next record we are going to be taking a piss in the general direction of all the crappy 99.9 percent of generic contemporary Mr. Goatse jerks out there".

The album cover and track list were revealed on 28 January 2011. The cover was done by Frode Sylthe, a friend of the band who also did the cover to their 2004 album Revolver. The band has said that they "really like his design aesthetic, and he seems to come up with something unique every single time".

== Background ==
The writing process for the album began in August 2009, a year after the release of Versus. Forty songs were written for the album prior to 21 April 2010, according to vocalist Peter Dolving. The album title was revealed by Dolving on 30 December 2010, at which time the album was almost finished. The title track "Unseen" was co-written by David Johansson of ColdTears.

== Track listing ==
All music by Björler / Björler / Dolving (track 6 "Unseen" was co-written with David Johansson). All lyrics by Peter Dolving.

No.	Title	Music	Note	Length
1.	"Never Better"	A.Björler		3:34
2.	"No Ghost"	Dolving / A. Björler	^{Note 1}	3:34
3.	"Catch 22"	A. Björler / J. Björler		3:44
4.	"Disappear"	Dolving	^{Note 2}	3:50
5.	"Motionless"	J. Björler		4:25
6.	"Unseen"	D. Johansson / The Haunted	^{Note 3}	3:02
7.	"The Skull"	A. Björler / Dolving		4:04
8.	"Ocean Park"	J. Björler		0:49
9.	"The City"	J. Björler / A. Björler		3:08
10.	"Them"	J. Björler		4:06
11.	"All Ends Well"	J. Björler		4:16
12.	"Done"	A. Björler		3:49
Total length:				42:21

Limited edition bonus tracks
No.	Title	Length
13.	"Attention"	3:52
14.	"The Reflection" (Live)	3:46
15.	"The Fallout" (Live)	4:06

Japan only
No.	Title	Length
13.	"Attention"	3:52
14.	"Just Asking"	2:47
15.	"The Reflection" (Live)	3:46
16.	"The Fallout" (Live)	4:06

=== Notes ===
1. "No Ghost" was the first sneak preview song off the album on 22 January 2011, when the band performed the song at the P3 Guld Gala, broadcast live on TV and radio throughout Sweden.

2. "Disappear" is the second song (originally third, see below) that premiered on 21 February 2011's edition of BBC Radio 1's "Rock Show With Daniel P Carter"

3. "Unseen" was planned to premiere on 11 February 2011 at 7:30 p.m. CET, broadcast on Bandit Rock, but never aired for unknown reasons. It was later available for streaming on the band's Facebook page on 24 February.

== Personnel ==
The Haunted

- Patrik Jensen – guitars
- Jonas Björler – bass
- Anders Björler – guitars
- Peter Dolving – vocals
- Per Möller Jensen – drums

Guests

- David Johansson – songwriter on "Unseen"
- Tue Madsen – mixing and production
