= Warning Shots =

Compilation album by The Haunted
- Released: 7 April 2009
- Recorded: 1997–2002
- Genres: Thrash metal, melodic death metal
- Length: 52:25 (disc 1); 41:39 (disc 2)
- Label: Earache
- Producer: Fredrik Nordström

The Haunted chronology
Versus (2008)	Warning Shots (2009)	Road Kill (2010)

Professional ratings
Review scores
Source	Rating
AllMusic	4.5/5 stars

Warning Shots is the first compilation album by Swedish heavy metal band The Haunted. It was released in Europe on 9 March 2009 and in the US on 7 April 2009.

== Track listing ==
=== Disc one ===
No.	Title	Length
1.	"Hate Song" (The Haunted)	3:01
2.	"Trespass" (Made Me Do It)	3:30
3.	"Shadow World" (One Kill Wonder)	3:43
4.	"D.O.A." (One Kill Wonder)	4:24
5.	"Undead" (The Haunted)	2:10
6.	"One Kill Wonder" (One Kill Wonder)	3:01
7.	"Under the Surface" (Made Me Do It)	4:16
8.	"In Vein" (The Haunted)	3:24
9.	"Hollow Ground" (Made Me Do It)	4:11
10.	"Everlasting" (One Kill Wonder)	3:09
11.	"Dark Intentions" (Made Me Do It)	1:30
12.	"Bury Your Dead" (Made Me Do It)	3:06
13.	"Shithead" (One Kill Wonder)	3:55
14.	"Chasm" (The Haunted)	3:10
15.	"Revelation" (Made Me Do It)	1:37
16.	"Forensick" (The Haunted)	4:18
Total length:		52:25

=== Disc two ===
No.	Title	Length
1.	"Ritual" (One Kill Wonder session track)	3:37
2.	"Creed" (One Kill Wonder session track)	3:36
3.	"Well of Souls" (Candlemass cover)	4:46
4.	"Eclipse" (The Haunted Made Me Do It session track)	2:55
5.	"Choke Hold" (live)	3:29
6.	"Leech" (live)	4:38
7.	"Three Times" (live)	3:05
8.	"Undead" (demo)	2:10
9.	"Shattered" (demo)	3:21
10.	"Undead" (Death & 1/2 Prod. rehearsal)	2:24
11.	"Now You Know" (Death & 1/2 Prod. rehearsal)	3:47
12.	"Blood Rust" (Death & 1/2 Prod. rehearsal)	3:51
Total length:		41:39

== Personnel ==
=== The Haunted ===
- Anders Björler – guitar
- Patrik Jensen – guitar
- Jonas Björler – bass
- Peter Dolving – vocals (disc 1: 1, 5, 8, 14, 16 & disc 2: 8–12)
- Per Möller Jensen – drums (disc 1: 2–4, 6, 7, 9–11, 15 & disc 2: 1–7)

=== Additional personnel ===
- Marco Aro – vocals (disc 1: 2–4, 6, 7, 9–11, 15 & disc 2: 1–7)
- Adrian Erlandsson – drums (disc 1: 1, 5, 8, 14, 16 & disc 2: 8–12)
