= Made Me Do It =

Studio album by The Haunted
- Released: 31 October 2000
- Recorded: December 1999 – February 2000 (Berno Studio, Malmö)
- Genre: Thrash metal, melodic death metal
- Length: 35:57
- Label: Earache
- Producer: Berno Paulsson; The Haunted

The Haunted chronology
The Haunted (1998)	Made Me Do It (2000)	Live Rounds in Tokyo (2001)

Professional ratings
Review scores
Source	Rating
AllMusic	4.5/5 stars
Rock Hard	9.5/10

Made Me Do It (also known as The Haunted Made Me Do It) is the second studio album by Swedish heavy metal band The Haunted, released on 31 October 2000. It was re-released in 2001 with the live album Live Rounds in Tokyo as a bonus CD.

The title was meant as a statement against censorship. The cover is a collage of serial killers, which was added "to emphasize the title" and because the band thought they were "fascinating characters" that fit the album's concept. The songs were written with input from all band members.

== Track listing ==
No.	Title	Lyrics	Music	Length
1.	"Dark Intentions"	(instrumental)	Patrik Jensen	1:30
2.	"Bury Your Dead"	Anders Björler, Jonas Björler, Marco Aro	A. Björler, J.Björler, Jensen	3:07
3.	"Trespass"	J.Björler	A. Björler, J.Björler	3:40
4.	"Leech"	Aro	A. Björler, Jensen	4:37
5.	"Hollow Ground"	Per Möller Jensen	A. Björler, J.Björler	4:10
6.	"Revelation"	J. Björler	A. Björler	1:34
7.	"The World Burns"	J. Björler, Aro	A. Björler, J. Björler	4:08
8.	"Human Debris"	Aro	A. Björler, Jensen	2:59
9.	"Silencer"	Jensen	Jensen	3:03
10.	"Under the Surface"	J. Björler, Aro	J. Björler	4:13
11.	"Victim Iced"	J. Björler, Aro	A. Björler, J.Björler, Jensen	2:55
Total length:				35:57

Limited edition bonus CD
Bonus track

No.	Title	Length
12.	"Eclipse"	2:52

Bonus disc

Live Rounds in Tokyo
No.	Title	Length
1.	"Intro"	1:30
2.	"Dark Intentions"	3:07
3.	"Bury Your Dead"	3:40
4.	"Chasm"	4:37
5.	"Trespass"	4:10
6.	"Shattered"	1:34
7.	"Hollow Ground"	4:08
8.	"Chokehold"	2:59
9.	"Leech"	3:03
10.	"In Vein"	4:13
11.	"Revelation"	2:55
12.	"Bullethole"	4:10
13.	"Silencer"	1:34
14.	"Three Times"	4:08
15.	"Undead"	2:59
16.	"Hate Song"	3:03
17.	"Eclipse"	4:13

== Reception ==
In 2005, Made Me Do It was ranked number 461 in Rock Hard magazine's book of The 500 Greatest Rock & Metal Albums of All Time.

== Credits ==
=== The Haunted ===
- Marco Aro – vocals, lyrics on disc 1: tracks 2, 4, 7, 8, 10 & 11.
- Anders Björler – lead guitar, Hammond organ, backing vocals, mixing, music on disc 1: tracks 2, 3, 4, 5, 6, 7, 10 & 11
- Patrik Jensen – guitar, music on disc 1: tracks 1, 2, 4, 5, 8, 9 & 11
- Jonas Björler – bass, Hammond organ, backing vocals, music on disc 1: tracks 2, 3, 5–8, 10 & 11
- Per Möller Jensen – drums, mixing

=== Additional personnel ===
- Andreas "Diaz" Pettersson – cover artwork, booklet design
- Berno Paulsson – engineering, mixing
- Henrik Larsson – assistant engineering
- Henrik Witt – photography
- Göran Finnberg – mastering
- Adrian Erlandsson – lyrics on "Bullet Hole"
