= Exit Wounds (The Haunted album) =

Studio album by The Haunted
- Released: 25 August 2014
- Recorded: 2014
- Genre: Thrash metal, melodic death metal, groove metal
- Length: 44:08
- Label: Century Media
- Producer: Juan Urteaga

The Haunted chronology
Unseen (2011)	Exit Wounds (2014)	Strength in Numbers (2017)

Exit Wounds is the eighth studio album by Swedish heavy metal band The Haunted, released on 25 August 2014. The album marks a return to their more heavy and aggressive sound after the alternative metal-influenced previous album Unseen. It is the first album released since former members Marco Aro (vocals) and Adrian Erlandsson (drums) rejoined the band and the first to feature Ola Englund on guitar.

== Reception ==
The album received a positive review from Chuck Loesch of Metal Injection. Al Kikuras of AngryMetalGuy.com described it as a "fine return to form" giving the album 4.5 out of 5.0. Jonathan Barkan of BloodyDisgusting.com also gave the album a positive review, ending with "Exit Wounds is the album that discouraged fans of The Haunted have been waiting and yearning for."

== Track listing ==
All tracks are written by The Haunted.

No.	Title	Length
1.	"317"	1:31
2.	"Cutting Teeth"	3:24
3.	"My Salvation"	4:02
4.	"Psychonaut"	3:24
5.	"Eye of the Storm"	3:49
6.	"Trend Killer"	3:12
7.	"Time (Will Not Heal)"	3:41
8.	"All I Have"	3:04
9.	"Temptation"	3:17
10.	"My Enemy"	1:00
11.	"Kill the Light"	4:08
12.	"This War"	2:28
13.	"Infiltrator"	3:32
14.	"Ghost in the Machine"	3:36
Total length:		44:08

Limited digipak edition bonus tracks
No.	Title	Length
15.	"As the Poison Sets In"	3:55
16.	"The Manifestation"	4:01
Total length:		52:04

Japanese edition bonus tracks
No.	Title	Length
15.	"As the Poison Sets In"	3:55
16.	"The Manifestation"	4:01
17.	"Eye of the Storm" (demo)	3:45
Total length:		55:49

== Personnel ==
The Haunted

- Jonas Björler – bass
- Adrian Erlandsson – drums
- Patrik Jensen – guitar
- Marco Aro – vocals
- Ola Englund – guitar
