= The Dead Eye =

Studio album by The Haunted
- Released: 30 October 2006
- Recorded: 1–31 May 2006 (PUK Studio, Denmark)
- Genres: Thrash metal, melodic death metal, alternative metal
- Length: 55:00 (standard edition); 61:18 (limited edition)
- Label: Century Media
- Producers: Tue Madsen, The Haunted

The Haunted chronology
Revolver (2004)	The Dead Eye (2006)	Versus (2008)

Professional ratings
Review scores
Source	Rating
AllMusic	3.5/5 stars

The Dead Eye is the fifth studio album by Swedish heavy metal band The Haunted. It was released on 30 October 2006.

The "bloodpack" edition includes the collectors edition DVD, promotional button, two-sided guitar pick, t-shirt, and a floating dead eyeball.

In 2006, Century Media also released "The Dead Eye" on 12" vinyl (120 gram), with the initial artwork and inserts (not the limited edition packaging). It contains the 13 tracks on the standard releases.

== Track listing ==
For the Japanese edition of the album, the song "The Burden" is placed on track 13, and the song "The Program" has lyrics.

All lyrics are written by Peter Dolving.

No.	Title	Music	Length
1.	"The Premonition" (instrumental)	A. Björler	1:00
2.	"The Flood"	A. Björler	4:07
3.	"The Medication"	A. Björler	3:10
4.	"The Drowning"	Dolving / J. Björler / A. Björler	4:13
5.	"The Reflection"	A. Björler	3:48
6.	"The Prosecution"	J. Björler / A. Björler	3:50
7.	"The Fallout"	A. Björler	4:22
8.	"The Medusa"	J. Björler / A. Björler	4:03
9.	"The Shifter"	A. Björler	2:55
10.	"The Cynic"	A. Björler / J. Björler	3:48
11.	"The Failure"	A. Björler / Dolving	5:10
12.	"The Stain"	A. Björler / J. Björler	4:14
13.	"The Guilt Trip" ("The Guilt Trip" ends at minute 5:02. After 2 minutes of silence [5:02–7:02], the hidden track "The Exit" starts.)	J. Björler / A. Björler	10:20
Total length:			55:00

Limited edition
No.	Title	Music	Length
1.	"The Premonition" (instrumental)		0:58
2.	"The Flood"		4:07
3.	"The Medication"		3:10
4.	"The Drowning"		4:13
5.	"The Reflection"		3:48
6.	"The Prosecution"		3:49
7.	"The Fallout"		4:22
8.	"The Medusa"		4:03
9.	"The Highwire" (bonus track)	Dolving	0:50
10.	"The Shifter"		2:55
11.	"The Cynic"		3:48
12.	"The Failure"		5:10
13.	"The Stain"		4:14
14.	"The Program" (bonus track)	A. Björler / J. Björler / Dolving	4:55
15.	"The Guilt Trip" (contains the hidden track "The Exit")		10:19
Total length:			61:18

The collectors US, European and Japanese editions also feature a bonus DVD.

Bonus DVD
No.	Title	Length
1.	"The Dead Eye – Making of Documentary"	20:00
2.	"All Against All" (promo video clip)	4:33
3.	"No Compromise" (promo video clip)	3:22
4.	"99" (live at Metal Mania Festival 2005)	4:00
5.	"Abysmal" (live at Metal Mania Festival 2005)	4:58

== Credits ==
- All music: Anders Björler / Jonas Björler (& Dolving)
- All lyrics: Peter Dolving

The Haunted

- Peter Dolving – vocals
- Patrik Jensen – guitar
- Anders Björler – guitar
- Jonas Björler – bass
- Per Möller Jensen – drums

Production

- Drums recorded at Puk Studio, Denmark, 1–7 May 2006
- Additional recordings at Antfarm Studio, Denmark, 8–31 May 2006
- Mixed and mastered by Tue Madsen at Antfarm Studio, Denmark, 1–15 June 2006
- Graphic design by Swedish Arms
