= Ola Englund =

Swedish guitarist (born 1981)

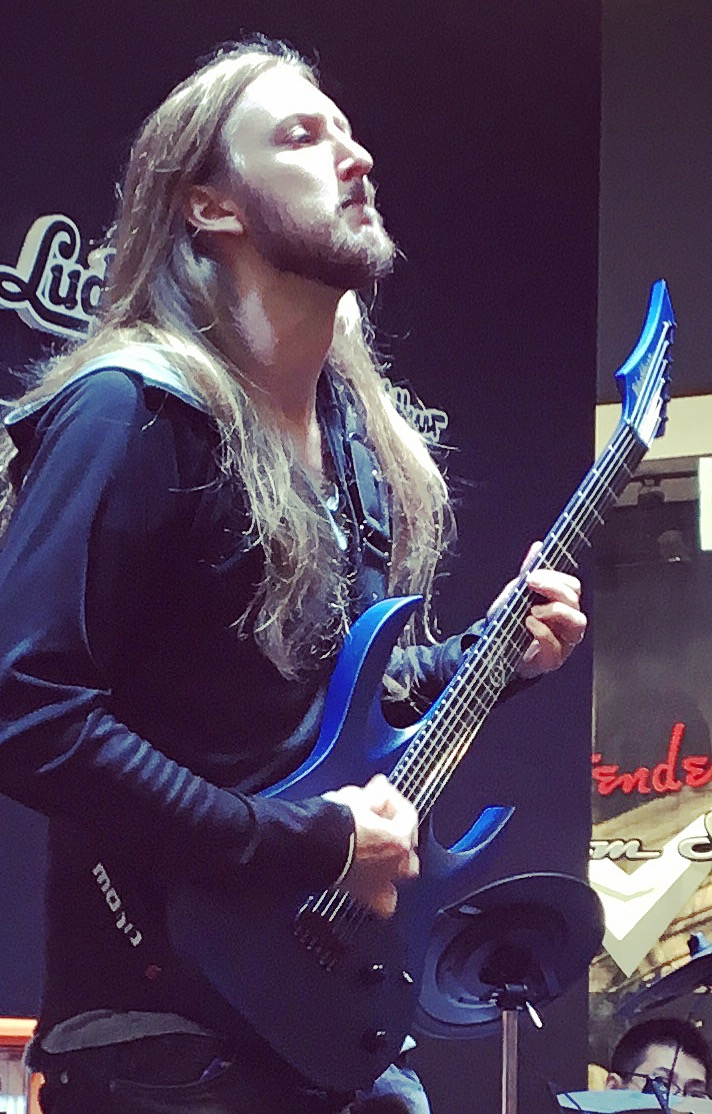
- Englund in 2016

Background information
- Born: 27 September 1981 (age 45); Stockholm, Sweden
- Genres: Death metal; groove metal; thrash metal; melodic death metal; progressive metal
- Occupations: Musician; record producer; songwriter; YouTuber
- Instruments: Guitar; bass
- Years active: 1994–present
- Member of: The Haunted; Feared
- Formerly of: Six Feet Under
- Spouse: Louise Englund
- Website: olaenglundshop.com

Ola "The Swede" Englund (born 27 September 1981) is a Swedish guitarist, YouTuber, record producer, and the owner of Solar Guitars. He is a founding member of the band Feared, plays lead guitar in the Swedish heavy metal band The Haunted, and is a former member of the band Six Feet Under. He has also been a member of Scarpoint, Facing Death, Subcyde, and Sorcerer.

In 2018 and 2019, Total Guitar magazine recognized him as Best Internet Personality. In 2019, he released his first solo album, Master of the Universe. His second solo album, Starzinger, was released on 26 April 2021.

Englund has a YouTube channel under his own name with nearly a million subscribers, where he creates videos about metal-related topics, including gear demos, news, artist interviews, Q&A sessions, and behind-the-scenes footage of his bands' gigs and business.

== Influences ==
Englund cites his biggest influences as Pantera, Dream Theater, Nevermore, Sepultura, Testament, Bolt Thrower, Entombed, and Children of Bodom. He is a fan of former Pantera guitarist Dimebag Darrell.

== Discography ==
Year	Band	Album	Notes
2005	Facing Death	Facing Death	Demo
2007	Subcyde	Subcyde	
2007	Feared	Feared	
2008	Feared	Feared (EP)	EP
2011	Feared	Rejects	
2011	Scarpoint	Mask of Sanity	
2012	Feared	Refeared	
2013	Feared	Furor Incarnatus	
2013	Feared	Vinter	
2013	Six Feet Under	Unborn	
2014	Feared	Elemental Nightmares – II	Split with Montecharge, Dead River Runs Dry, and Satyros
2014	The Haunted	Eye of the Storm	EP
2014	The Haunted	Exit Wounds	
2015	Feared	Synder	
2016	Feared	Reborn	Compilation
2017	Feared	Svart	
2017	The Haunted	Strength in Numbers	
2019	Ola Englund	Master of the Universe	
2021	Ola Englund	Starzinger	
2023	The Chug Project	Volume 1	Songs are based on "Sunday with Ola" riffs
2023	The Chug Project	Volume 2	Songs are based on "Sunday with Ola" riffs
2025	The Haunted	Songs of Last Resort	
2026	Ola Englund	The Neverending Story	

=== Singles ===
- "Pizza Hawaii" (2019)
- "Cerberus" (2019)
- "Solar Pt. 1" (2019)
- "The Sun & the Moon" (2020)
- "Stars & Ponies" (2020)
- "Cringy AF" (2021)
- "Demon(etized)" (2021)
- "The First of Its Kind" (2023)
- "Live In You" (2023)
- "The Ember Saga" (2026)
- "Dogma Progma" (2026)

== Gear ==
Englund has had signature guitar lines with Strictly 7 (2011–2013) and Washburn (2013–2017), as well as a signature amplifier from Randall known as the Randall Satan (2014–2019). In November 2017, he announced the launch of his own guitar brand, Solar Guitars.
