= One Kill Wonder =

Studio album by The Haunted
- Released: 17 February 2003
- Recorded: 6 September – 28 October 2002
- Studio: Studio Fredman
- Genres: Thrash metal, melodic death metal
- Length: 38:11
- Label: Earache
- Producers: Fredrik Nordström, The Haunted

The Haunted chronology
Live Rounds in Tokyo (2001)	One Kill Wonder (2003)	Revolver (2004)

Professional ratings
Review scores
Source	Rating
AllMusic	4/5 stars

One Kill Wonder is the third studio album by Swedish heavy metal band The Haunted. It was released on 17 February 2003.

== Background ==
The writing for this album began around 2 September 2001.

"D.O.A." served as the album's only single. It was accompanied by a music video which found limited television airing due to its graphic nature. The song is available as downloadable content in the video game Rock Band.

Marco Aro left the band after this record. He would return to record vocals for The Haunted's 2014 studio album Exit Wounds, and has remained with the band ever since.

== Track listing ==
No.	Title	Lyrics	Music	Length
1.	"Privation of Faith Inc."	(instrumental)	Jensen	1:51
2.	"Godpuppet"	Aro	Jensen	1:59
3.	"Shadow World"	A. Björler/J.Björler	A. Björler	3:40
4.	"Everlasting"	Aro	A. Björler	3:08
5.	"D.O.A."	A. Björler/Aro	Jensen/A. Björler	4:21
6.	"Demon Eyes"	(instrumental)	A. Björler	4:38
7.	"Urban Predator"	Aro/Per Möller Jensen	A. Björler/J. Björler	3:14
8.	"Downward Spiral"	J. Björler	J. Björler/A. Björler	4:21
9.	"Shithead"	Aro	A. Björler/J. Björler	3:52
10.	"Bloodletting"	Per Möller Jensen	Jensen	4:08
11.	"One Kill Wonder"	Aro/J. Björler	J.Björler/A. Björler	2:59
Total length:				38:11

Special edition bonus tracks
No.	Title	Length
12.	"Creed"	3:34
13.	"Well of Souls" (Candlemass cover)	4:43

Japanese bonus track
No.	Title	Length
12.	"Ritual"	3:35

2004 reissue bonus tracks
No.	Title	Length
12.	"Creed"	3:34
13.	"Ritual"	3:35
14.	"Well of Souls" (Candlemass cover)	4:43

== Credits ==
The Haunted

- Marco Aro – vocals
- Anders Björler – lead guitar
- Patrik Jensen – guitar
- Jonas Björler – bass
- Per Möller Jensen – drums

Guest musician

- Michael Amott – guitar solo on "Bloodletting"
