= Versus (The Haunted album) =

Studio album by The Haunted
- Released: 17 September 2008
- Recorded: April 2008
- Studios: PUK Studio, Denmark, IF Studios
- Genres: Thrash metal, groove metal, alternative metal
- Length: 39:03
- Label: Century Media
- Producers: Tue Madsen, The Haunted

The Haunted chronology
The Dead Eye (2006)	Versus (2008)	Warning Shots (2009)

Professional ratings
Review scores
Source	Rating
AllMusic	3.5/5 stars

Versus is the sixth studio album by Swedish heavy metal band The Haunted. It was released on 17 September 2008. It shows an emphasis on the aggressive thrash metal sound from their earlier albums while maintaining some of the experimentation from their fifth album The Dead Eye. All instruments were recorded live like their debut album, The Haunted, and solos and vocals were added once they had the songs down. The album is more or less about the decadence of mankind as the last two songs "Faultline" and "Imperial Death March" point out.

== Track listing ==
All lyrics are written by Peter Dolving.

No.	Title	Music	Length
1.	"Moronic Colossus"	Jensen	3:50
2.	"Pieces"	J. Björler / A. Björler	3:50
3.	"Little Cage"	A. Björler, Jensen	3:15
4.	"Trenches"	A. Björler	3:42
5.	"Ceremony"	J. Björler / A. Björler	3:43
6.	"Skuld"	A. Björler	2:49
7.	"Crusher"	Jensen	3:13
8.	"Rivers Run"	J. Björler	4:32
9.	"Iron Mask"	A. Björler	3:41
10.	"Faultline"	Jensen	3:44
11.	"Imperial Death March"	Dolving	2:48
Total length:			39:03

Japanese edition bonus tracks
No.	Title	Length
12.	"Seize the Day"	2:19
13.	"Narcotic"	3:51
14.	"Versus"	4:06
15.	"Devolve"	3:28
16.	"Meat Wagon" (^{Note 1})	3:07

Exclusive to European iTunes
No.	Title	Length
12.	"Sacrifice"	4:46

Exclusive to United States iTunes
No.	Title	Length
12.	"Walk on Water"	3:35

Collateral Damage (disc 2)
No.	Title	Length
1.	"Seize the Day"	2:19
2.	"Narcotic"	3:51
3.	"Versus"	4:06
4.	"Devolve"	3:28

=== Note ===
1. "Meat Wagon" is the only song on Japanese issue that is not on the special edition issue while the rest of the songs are.

== Credits ==
- Peter Dolving – vocals
- Patrik Jensen – guitar
- Anders Björler – guitar
- Jonas Björler – bass
- Per Möller Jensen – drums

== Release history ==
Date	Region
19 September 2008	Rest of Europe
10 October 2008	United States
