= The Haunted (Swedish band) =

Swedish heavy metal band

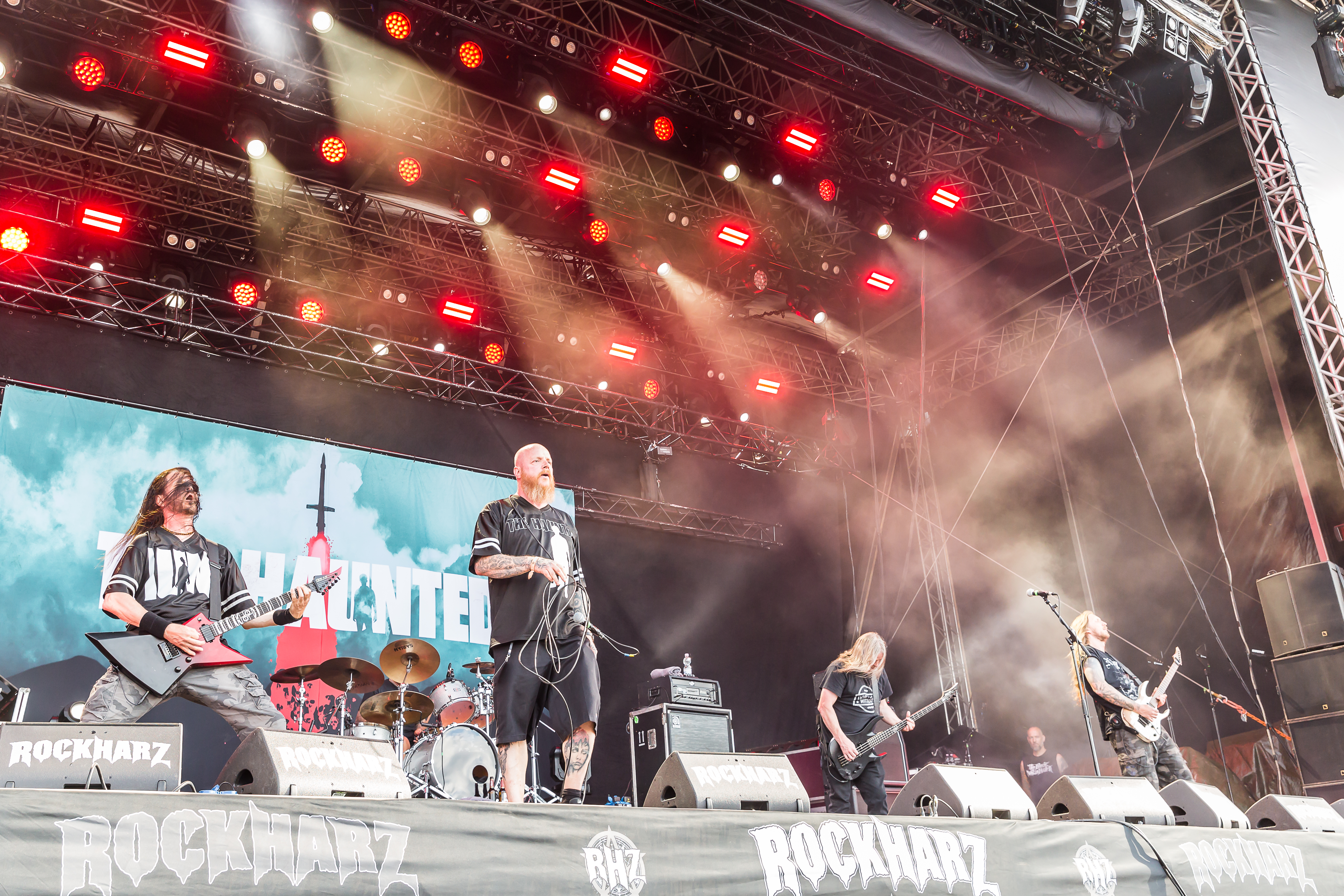
- The Haunted at Rockharz 2026

Background information
- Origin: Gothenburg, Sweden
- Genres: Thrash metal; melodic death metal; groove metal
- Years active: 1996–present
- Labels: Century Media, Earache
- Members: Patrik Jensen; Jonas Björler; Adrian Erlandsson; Marco Aro; Ola Englund
- Past members: John Zwetsloot; Peter Dolving; Anders Björler; Per Möller Jensen
- Website: the-haunted.com

The Haunted is a Swedish heavy metal band from Gothenburg, formed in 1996. The original members were Anders and Jonas Björler, Peter Dolving, Adrian Erlandsson and Patrik Jensen. Both of the Björler brothers and Erlandsson were members of the seminal melodic death metal band At the Gates, a pioneering force in the Swedish death metal scene.

The band currently consists of Marco Aro (vocals), Patrik Jensen (rhythm guitar), Ola Englund (lead guitar), Jonas Bjorler (bass), and Adrian Erlandsson (drums).

== History ==
=== Formation and The Haunted; first Dolving and Adrian-era (1996–1999) ===
On 27 July 1996, Patrik Jensen co-created the band with Adrian Erlandsson, who had just become an ex-member of his former band, At the Gates, due to the band's split the day before. They had made their demo, called Demo '97, in 1997.

The band were signed to Earache Records and subsequently released their first album, the self-titled debut The Haunted in 1998. The album resulted in The Haunted being praised as Newcomer of the Year by several magazines, and the album being called Album of the Year by Terrorizer Magazine. The Haunted made a respectable live reputation staging the Swedish metal scene, as well the international scene, touring the UK with Napalm Death.

After the release of this album, Peter Dolving and Adrian Erlandsson both left the band in 1999, the former focusing on a solo career and the latter joining Cradle of Filth. Their replacements were Marco Aro and Per Möller Jensen. The band began to record their second album shortly afterwards. Adrian left the band because he didn't like the deal with Earache Records.

=== Made Me Do It and One Kill Wonder; first Aro-era (2000–2003) ===
Their second album, Made Me Do It, released in 2000, was more melodic and resembled the Gothenburg style (with bands such as At the Gates, etc.) more than old-school thrash metal that was used on The Haunted. It is originally called Made Me Do It, but the idea is for the band name to be included in the title. "The Haunted Made Me Do It" topped CMJ Loud Rock Radio Chart for four weeks, and won a Swedish Grammy for Best Hard Rock Album. The album was followed by European tours with Entombed and Nile, The Crown in the UK, and In Flames in Japan. The Haunted played festivals such as 2000 Decibel, Hultsfred (both in Sweden), Graspop (Belgium), and Wacken Open Air (Germany). The band subsequently released their first live album - Live Rounds in Tokyo.

In August 2001, guitarist/songwriter Anders Björler left the band and he was temporarily replaced by Marcus Sunesson of The Crown for The Haunted's headlining tour; in less than a year Björler returned to the band. This meant that he could appear on the third studio album.

The next album was released in February 2003 and was titled One Kill Wonder. The Haunted broke their own record being listed at number one on CMJ Loud Rock Radio Chart in five weeks. Alternative Press hailed The Haunted as one of metal's 25 most important bands. The song D.O.A., from this album, became available for download in March 2008 for the video game Rock Band, on the Xbox 360's Xbox Live Marketplace, and the PlayStation 3's PlayStation Network. Another song from the same album, Shadow World, was announced as a future download.

=== Revolver; second Dolving-era (2003–2005) ===
One Kill Wonder resulted in the band dominating album charts all over the world, and their first tours to Australia and South Africa, another tour to Japan, and a second Swedish Grammy. After another tour to Scandinavia, North America, United Kingdom and Europe in late 2003, the sudden departure of Marco Aro came as a shock. Though, this opened a new chance of building up a reunion with former vocalist Peter Dolving.

Their first album with Peter Dolving back at the helm (and signed to a new deal with Century Media), was entitled Revolver. The new album was released in October 2004 and the name was to convey the evolution of the band and the music it now played as a whole. Revolver was met with a fair amount of fan support and critical acclaim, and the band toured the world extensively in support of it, including a second stage spot at Ozzfest 2005. On 2 February 2005, Marco Aro played his last show in Stockholm, Sweden but as a guest singer. In 2006, the band performed on the Extreme The Dojo vol.15 tour in Japan with Exodus and Nile, while Edge of Spirit opened for them.

=== The Dead Eye and Versus (2006–2009) ===
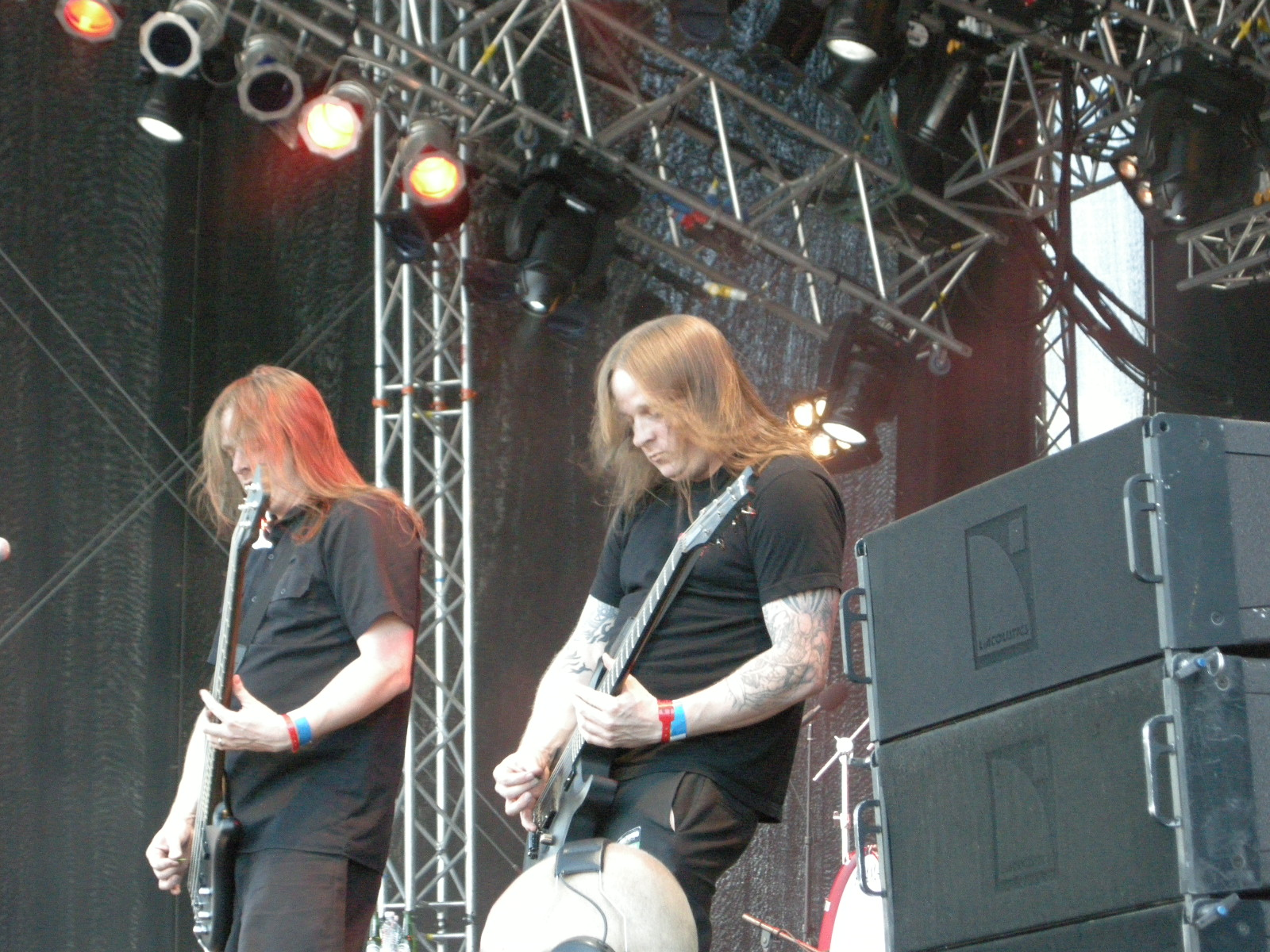
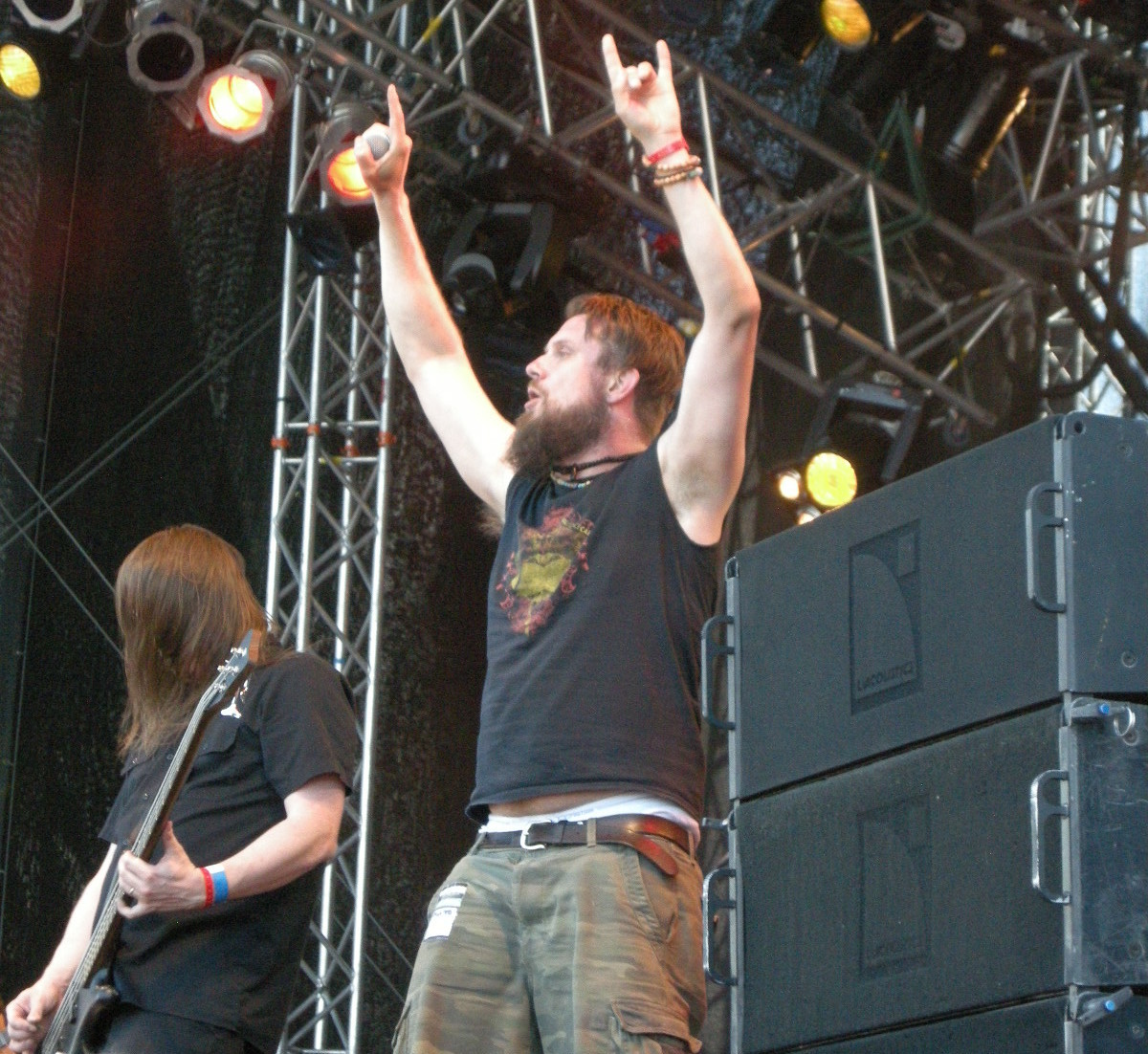
The Haunted in 2009

The Haunted's fifth studio album, The Dead Eye, was released on 30 October 2006 in Europe and was again a success, showing a more sinister side to Dolving's lyrics and a more technical, haunting musical approach. It was released in the US on 31 October 2006. They later toured Europe and toured with Dark Tranquillity, Into Eternity, and Scar Symmetry for the North America Metal For The Masses tour. They later toured Europe for the Cursed Earth tour with bands like Wolf, Municipal Waste, and Lyzanxia before taking a break in order to later return to play further tours and some shows in Russia.

Their sixth studio album, Versus, was released on 17 September 2008 in Sweden, 19–24 September in the rest of Europe, and 14 October in the US. In 2009 the band released a compilation album Warning Shots. In April 2010, the band released a live CD called Road Kill, and they supported heavy metal legends Slayer on their August 2010 tour. The band was also confirmed as being part of the soundtrack for Namco Bandai Games' 2010 remake of Splatterhouse.

=== Unseen, going on hiatus (2010–2012) ===
In April 2010, Dolving revealed that they had started writing new material, and the recording of a seventh album started that same fall. On 30 December, the band announced that the upcoming album was to be called Unseen and was to be released in March 2011.

The first sneak preview of the album was on 22 January 2011, when the band performed the song "No Ghost" on the P3 Guld Gala, broadcast live on TV and radio throughout Sweden.

However, on 29 February 2012, Peter Dolving quit the band for the second time. On 1 March 2012, The Haunted announced vocalist auditions via their Facebook page:

The Haunted is looking for a new voice... Serious applicants please send your submissions, including two songs from the Haunted back catalogue and a few words to describe yourself. Images & links to performance video clips are much appreciated and will be most valuable in the screening process. Send your application to the e-mail address above. Thanks!

On 16 October 2012 two more members of the band, guitarist Anders Björler and drummer Per Möller Jensen also quit, leaving the band's future up in the air. Jonas announced on the band's Facebook that both he and Patrik were still deeply committed to the band, but acknowledged that now two additional band members had left, they were naturally uncertain of the band's future. Unsurprisingly, a hiatus followed this turbulent series of events, and fans waited nervously to see what would transpire.

=== Exit Wounds; second Aro and Adrian-era (2014–2016) ===
Patrik Jensen and Jonas Björler had a discussion at Jonas' 40th birthday party about not letting The Haunted disband. When Jensen asked Björler who should be the new vocalist in the band, Björler could only think of former member, Marco Aro. A few days later Jensen phoned Aro asking him to rejoin The Haunted. Aro had missed being in the band and was tempted to rejoin, but he was hesitant at first because he was not interested in returning to the hectic touring he had done with The Haunted in his past stint as vocalist. The Haunted had done a lot of touring for almost a decade straight after Aro left, reducing the band's desire to continue with such scheduling going forward. More hesitation came because Aro had struggled with drug addiction during his time with the band, causing problems with his family, which he did not want to risk a reoccurrence of. He indicated that he needed to discuss rejoining the band with his family. Aro was also in the band The Resistance and did not want to have conflicting schedules with both bands, so he had to have a discussion with The Resistance as well. Aro told Jensen he'd give him a response two weeks later. By then, the band had shown him the a breakdown of future tours, which encouraged Aro to rejoin The Haunted. Before publicly revealing information of the band's new lineup, Aro stated only that there was "good news coming from the band". His picture was in a silhouette on the band's official Facebook the day before the band announced a new line-up.

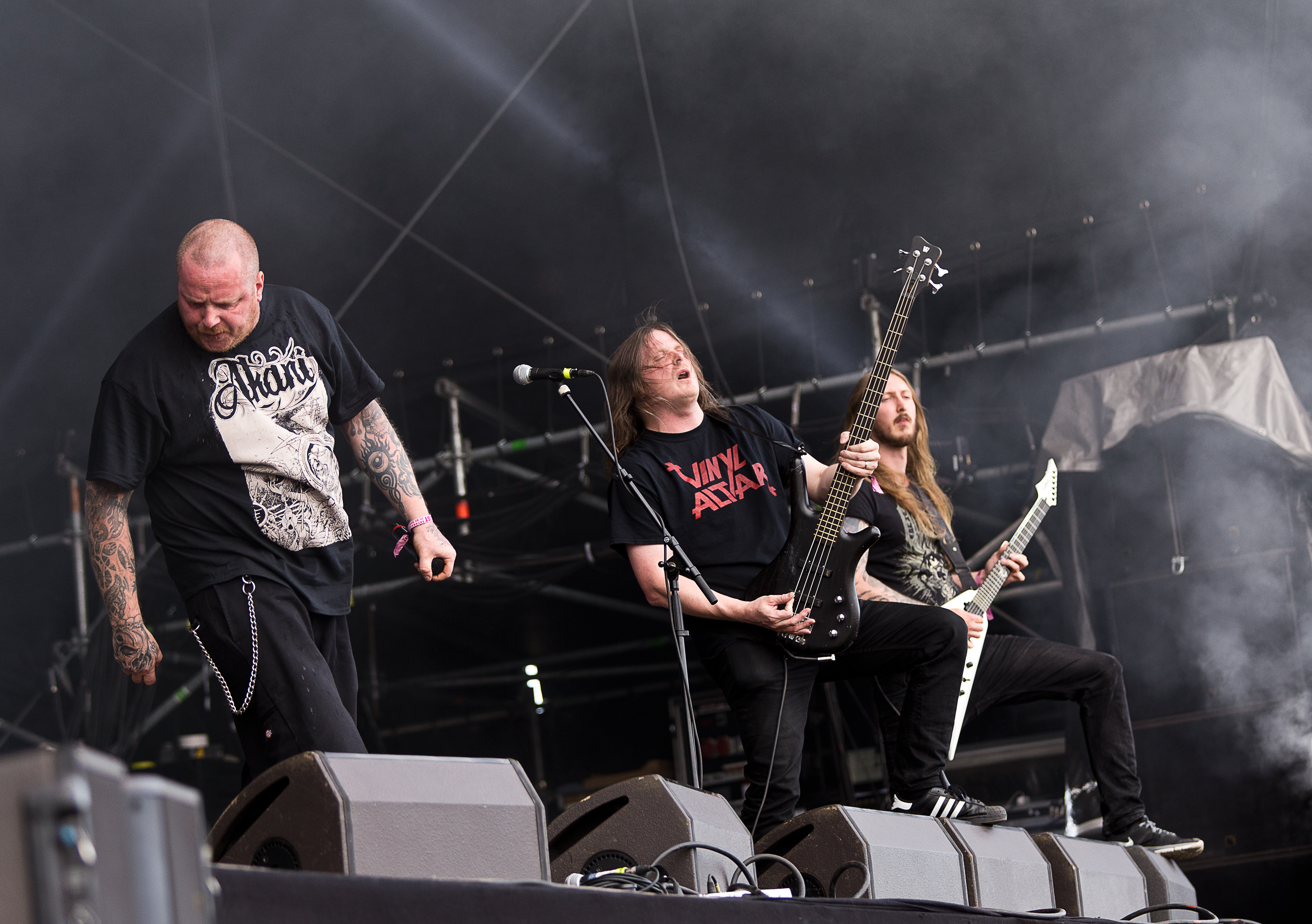
The Haunted at the Rockharz Open Air, Germany, 2015

Original drummer Adrian Erlandsson also now returned to the band. Adrian mentioned in an interview on YouTube under the name RichardMetalFan that after being in Paradise Lost, he felt that his drumming didn't match the music, so when Jensen called him, he took the chance to rejoin the band because he wanted to get back into playing heavier music, and Ola Englund from Six Feet Under was brought in as the band's new lead guitarist. The band then began writing for an EP titled Eye of the Storm, which was released on 20 January 2014 in Europe and 21 January 2014 in North America. The band had already been rehearsing before the announcement of the new lineup, and their first live performance followed at the 70000 Tons of Metal which set sail 27–31 January 2014.

On 1 July 2014, it was announced that their new album would be titled Exit Wounds, with the release date of 25 August 2014 in Europe and 2 September 2014 in North America. The track listing and the album cover were revealed on the same day.

Exit Wounds marks the first album to return to the band’s old heavier style of death metal since their album One Kill Wonder.

The band participated in Maryland Deathfest in May 2015.

=== Strength in Numbers (2017–2021) ===
On 10 May 2017, Century Media Records announced the band's ninth studio album would be entitled Strength in Numbers and it was subsequently released worldwide on 25 August 2017.

=== Songs of Last Resort (2022–present) ===
On 7 August 2022, Ola announced on his YouTube channel that The Haunted were preparing to write a new album.

By August 2024, The Haunted were in the studio working on their tenth studio album, with drummer Adrian Erlandsson confirming that he was "working on drums" for it.

On 21 March 2025, the band announced their tenth studio album, Songs of Last Resort, was released on 30 May.

On the YouTube channel "The Creative Imbalance" Patrik Jensen said, "Some people think we took a break from playing and stuff but we never did, it was just a series of unfortunate events, being it hard to record an album, the pandemic (referring to Covid) and all that." He further said, "It feels good, because The Haunted is I think is such a good band and we have so many good members in the band and people care about the band, so it would be a shame not to push forward and release something." He says, "The last 2-3 years I've been doing a lot of shows with The Halo Effect and when we do signings and stuff people, they-they know, well most people, well SOME people, know who I am and we shake hands at the signing table and they go 'don't forget about The Haunted, don't forget about it' ok ok, people care, yeah we should care about this, if we don't nourish it, it's going to disappear, so let's do an album." At the near end of the video Jensen confirmed that it will not be another 8 years and that he has already started working on the new album.

== Band members ==
The Haunted, band members live at Rockharz 2026

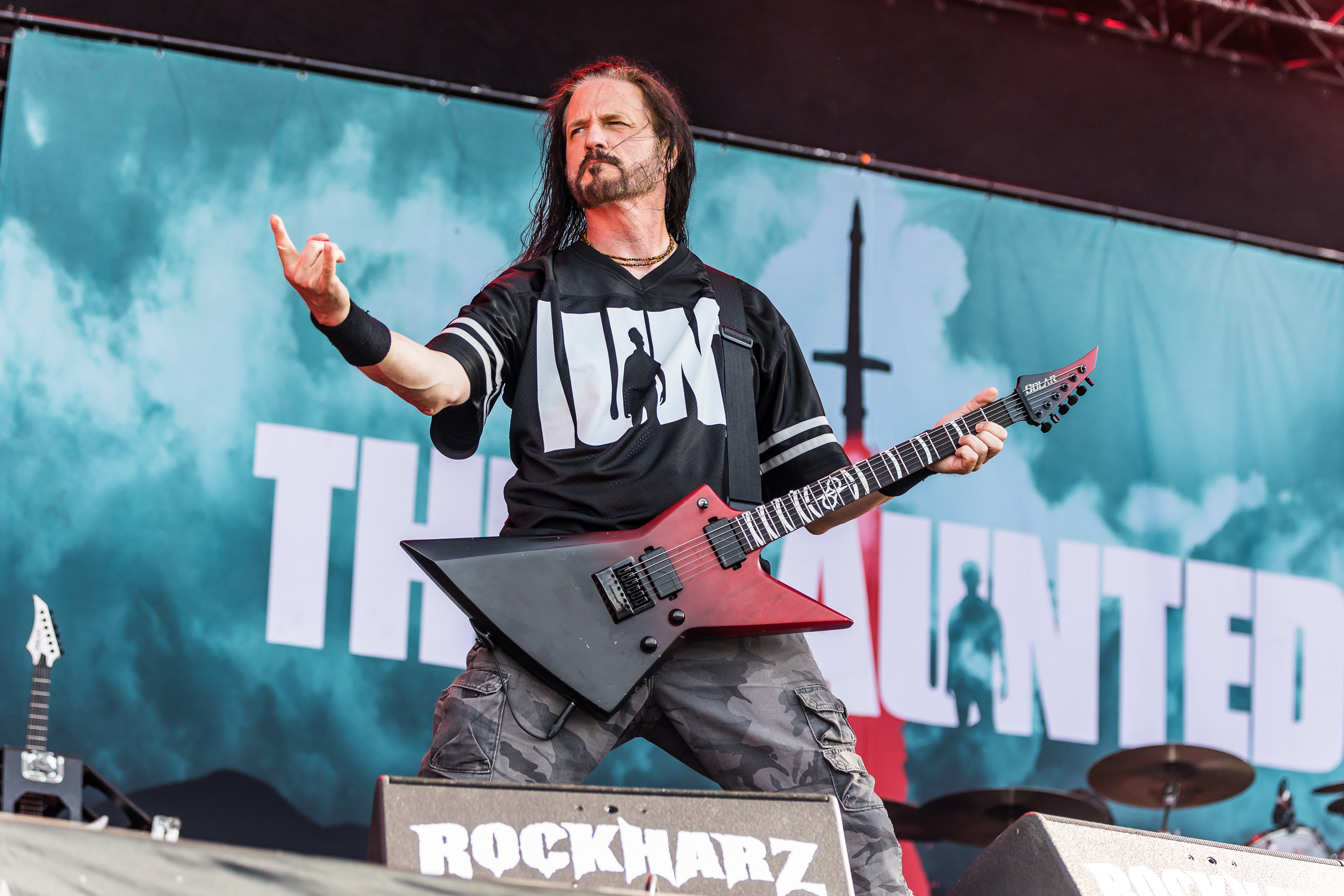
Patrik Jensen, rhythm-guitar

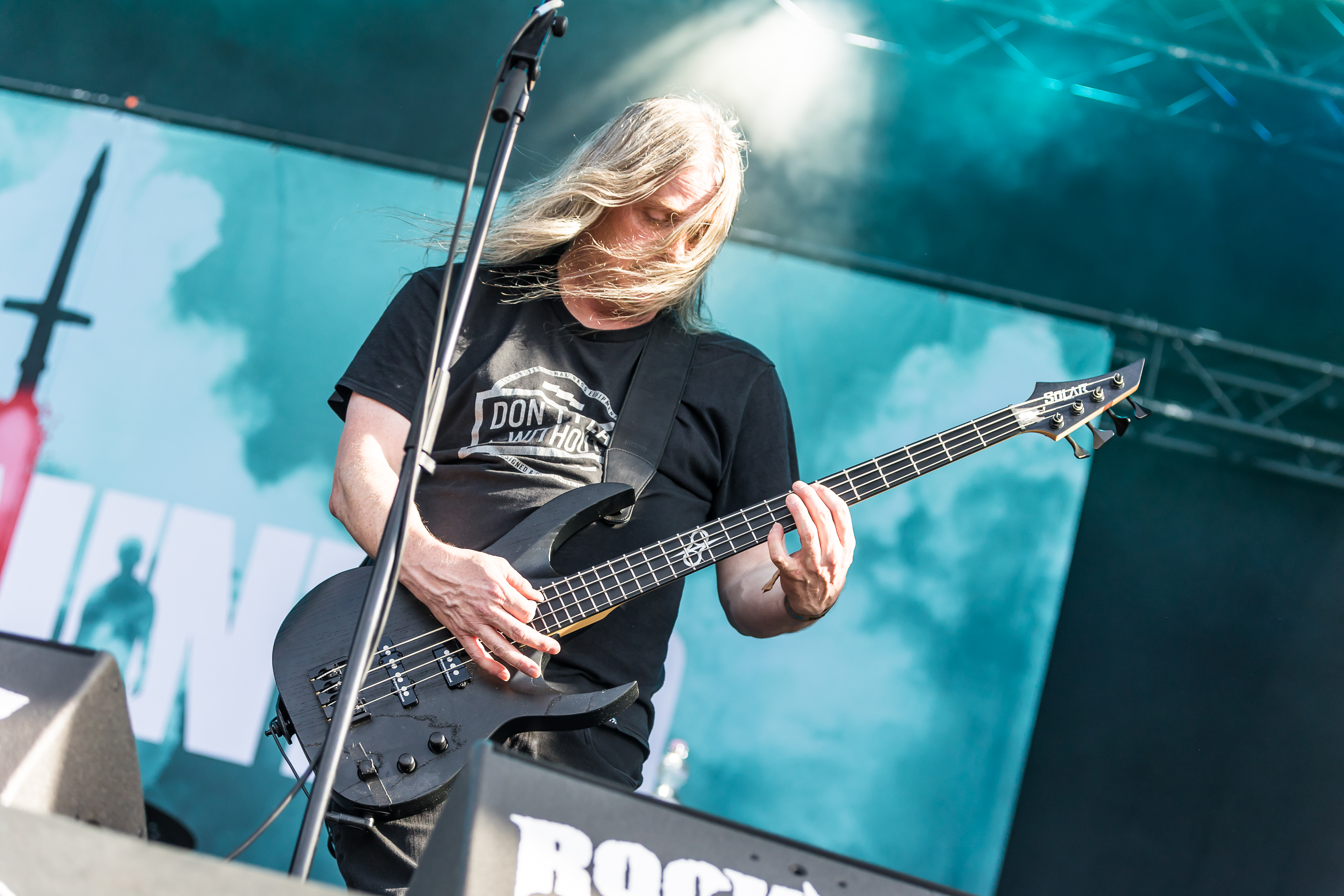
Jonas Björler, bass

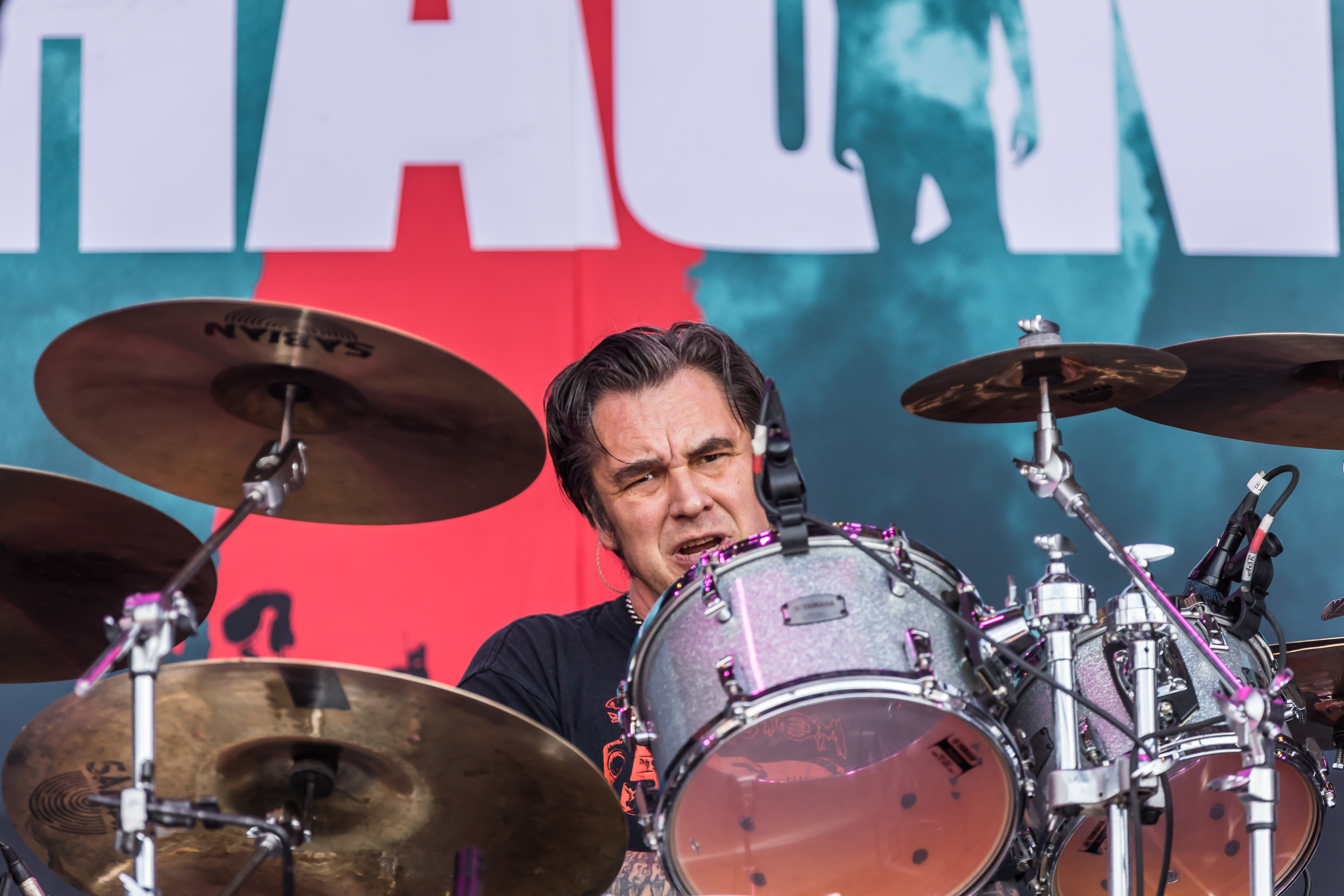
Adrian Erlandsson, drums

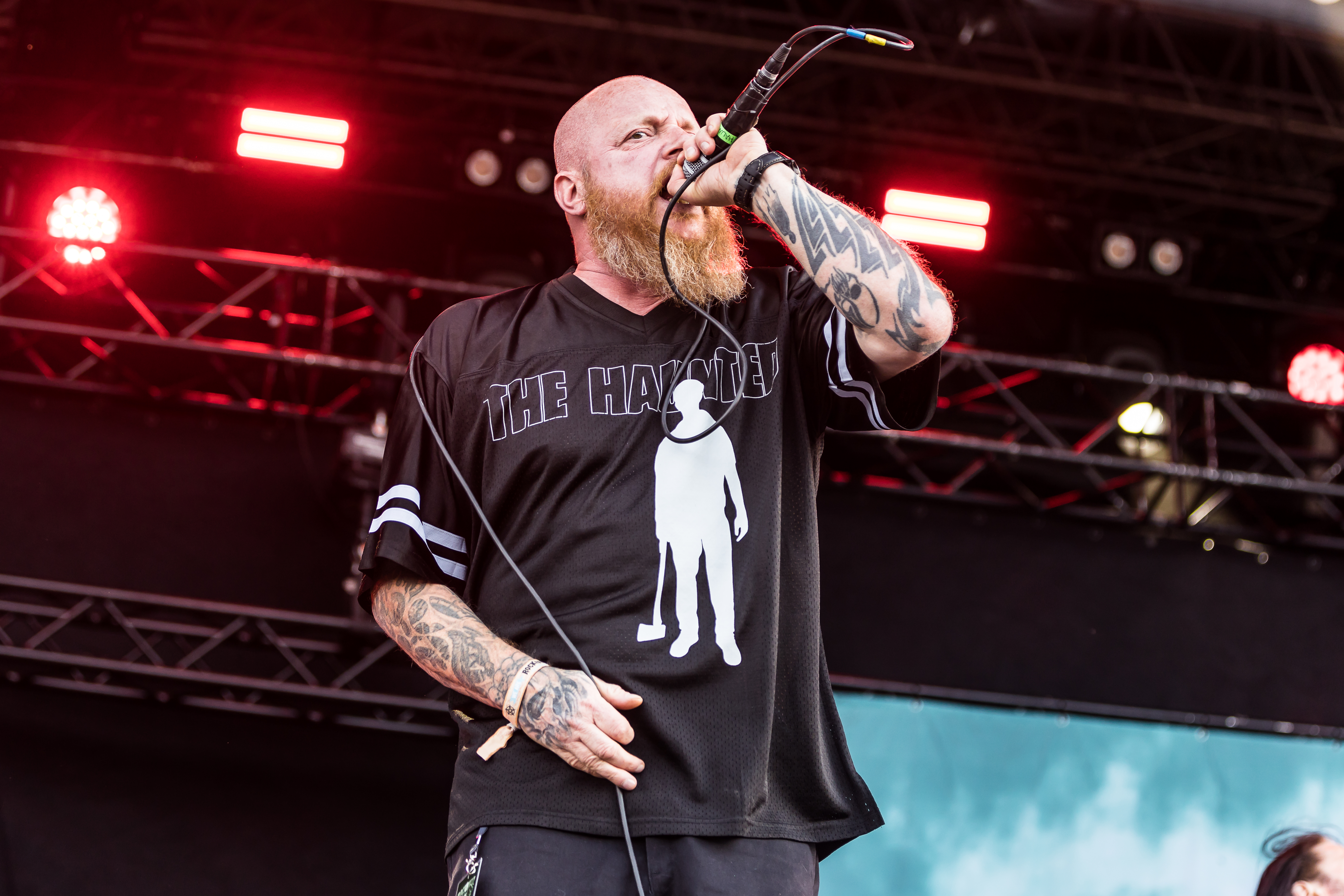
Marco Aro, vocals

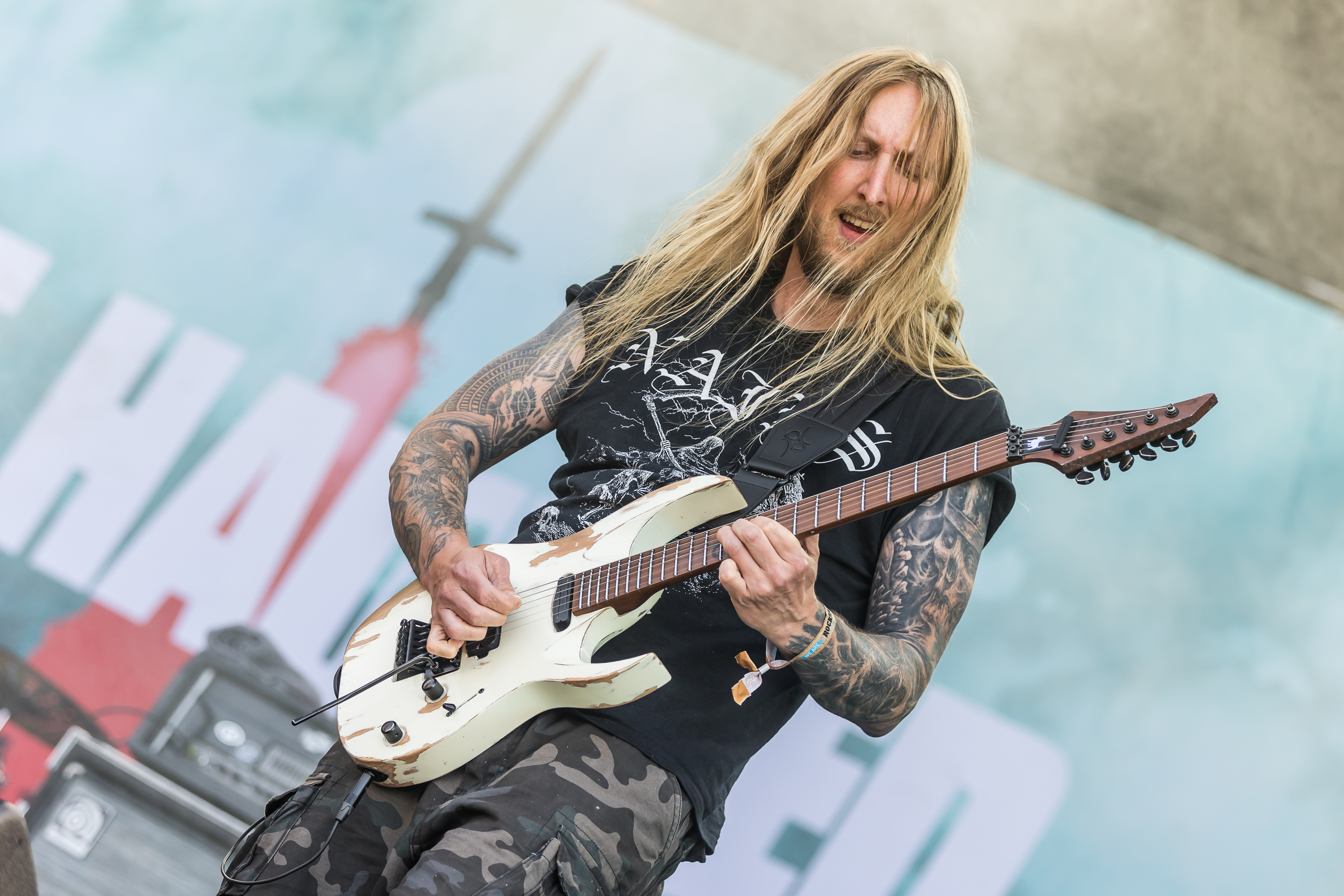
Ola Englund, lead-guitar

Current

- Patrik Jensen – rhythm guitar (1996–present), lead guitar (2001–2002, 2012–2013)
- Jonas Björler – bass (1996–present)
- Adrian Erlandsson – drums (1996–1999, 2013–present)
- Marco Aro – vocals (1999–2003, 2013–present)
- Ola Englund – lead guitar (2013–present)

Former

- Peter Dolving – vocals (1996–1998, 2003–2012)
- John Zwetsloot – lead guitar (1996)
- Anders Björler – lead guitar (1996–2001, 2002–2012)
- Per Möller Jensen – drums (1999–2012)

== Discography ==
- The Haunted (1998)
- Made Me Do It (2000)
- One Kill Wonder (2003)
- rEVOLVEr (2004)
- The Dead Eye (2006)
- Versus (2008)
- Unseen (2011)
- Exit Wounds (2014)
- Strength in Numbers (2017)
- Songs of Last Resort (2025)
