= Anders Björler =

Swedish guitarist

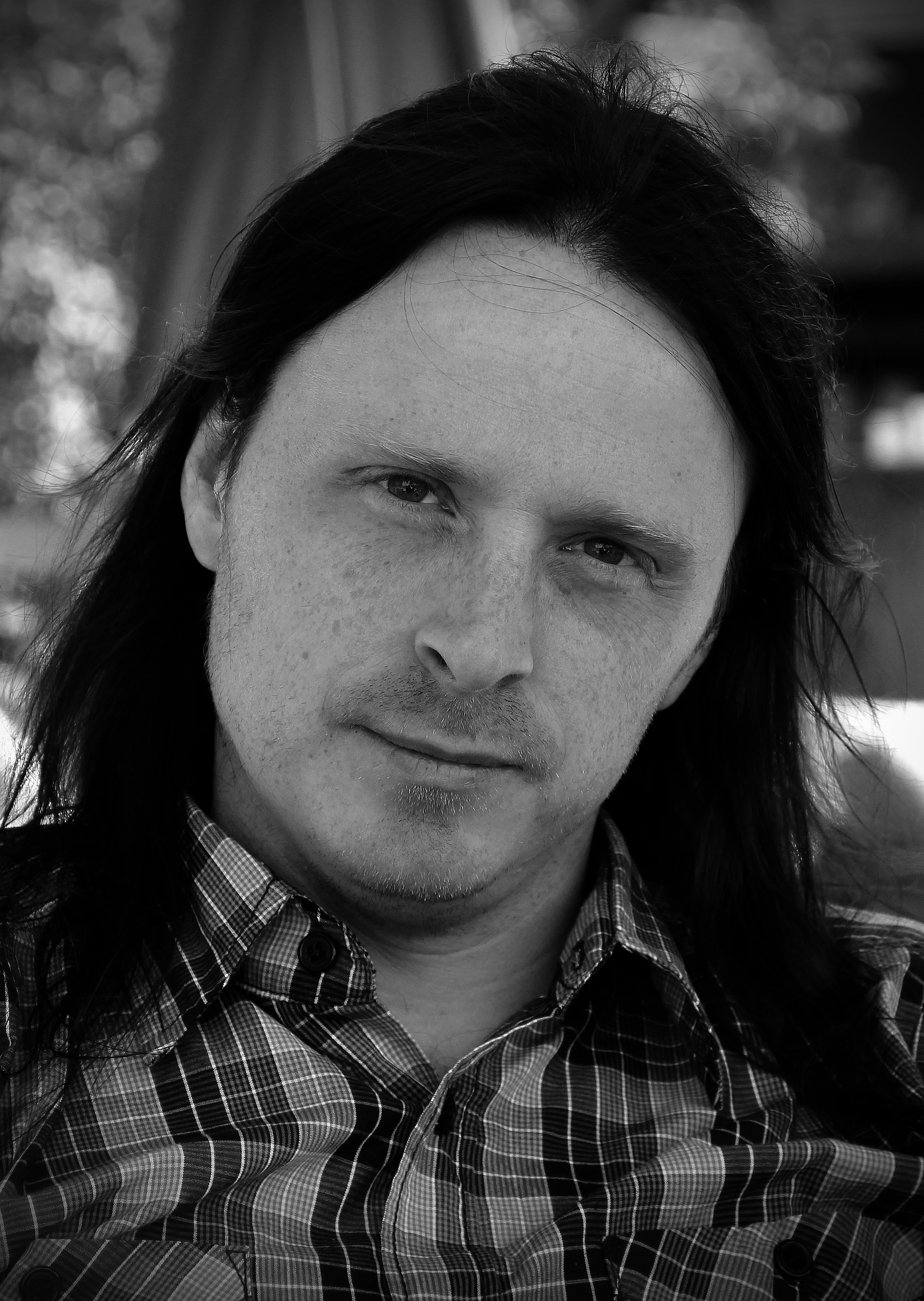
- Björler in 2011

Background information
- Born: Anders Martin Björler; 26 February 1973 (age 53)
- Genres: Melodic death metal, death metal, thrash metal, groove metal, jazz fusion, instrumental, progressive rock
- Occupation: Musician
- Instrument: Guitar
- Years active: 1990–present
- Member of: At the Gates
- Formerly of: The Haunted

Anders Björler (born 26 February 1973) is a Swedish musician. He is best known as the lead guitarist in the metal bands The Haunted and At the Gates, alongside his bass-playing twin brother Jonas Björler.

Björler has also directed, edited and produced music videos, documentaries and in-the-studio features for bands such as In Flames, Dark Tranquillity and Meshuggah, as well as his own bands.

== Career ==
=== At the Gates (1990–1996, 2007–2017, 2022–present) ===
Björler was a founding member of the melodic death metal band At the Gates with his twin brother Jonas Björler, as well as Tomas Lindberg, Alf Svensson, and Adrian Erlandsson. In July 1996, at the end of the touring cycle for their critically acclaimed 1995 album Slaughter of the Soul, Björler left the band and At the Gates consequently split up. In October 2007, At the Gates announced a final reunion for 2008, playing major European music festivals and tour dates in the US, Japan and Sweden. The band reunited a second time in 2011, however, to play more shows. The band also released a comeback album, entitled At War with Reality, in late 2014. Björler departed the band in March 2017, with At the Gates continuing on with a replacement guitarist and a new album following his departure from the band. In late 2022, following the departure of Jonas Stålhammar, Björler rejoined At the Gates as a guitarist.

=== The Haunted (1996–2001, 2002–2012) ===
In September 1996, a few months after the break up of At the Gates, Björler joined The Haunted as the lead guitarist. He remained in the band until 2001, when he decided to focus on university film studies. Björler returned to the band in 2002, but once again departed from the band in October 2012.

=== Instrumental project (solo) (2013–present) ===
Björler's debut album 'Antikythera' was released by Anders Fridén (In Flames) on his label Razzia Notes Records in November 2013. It focuses on Björler's love for Italian movie soundtracks from the 1960s–80s, but also contains elements of English progressive rock, jazz, post-rock and Swedish folk music.

== Discography ==
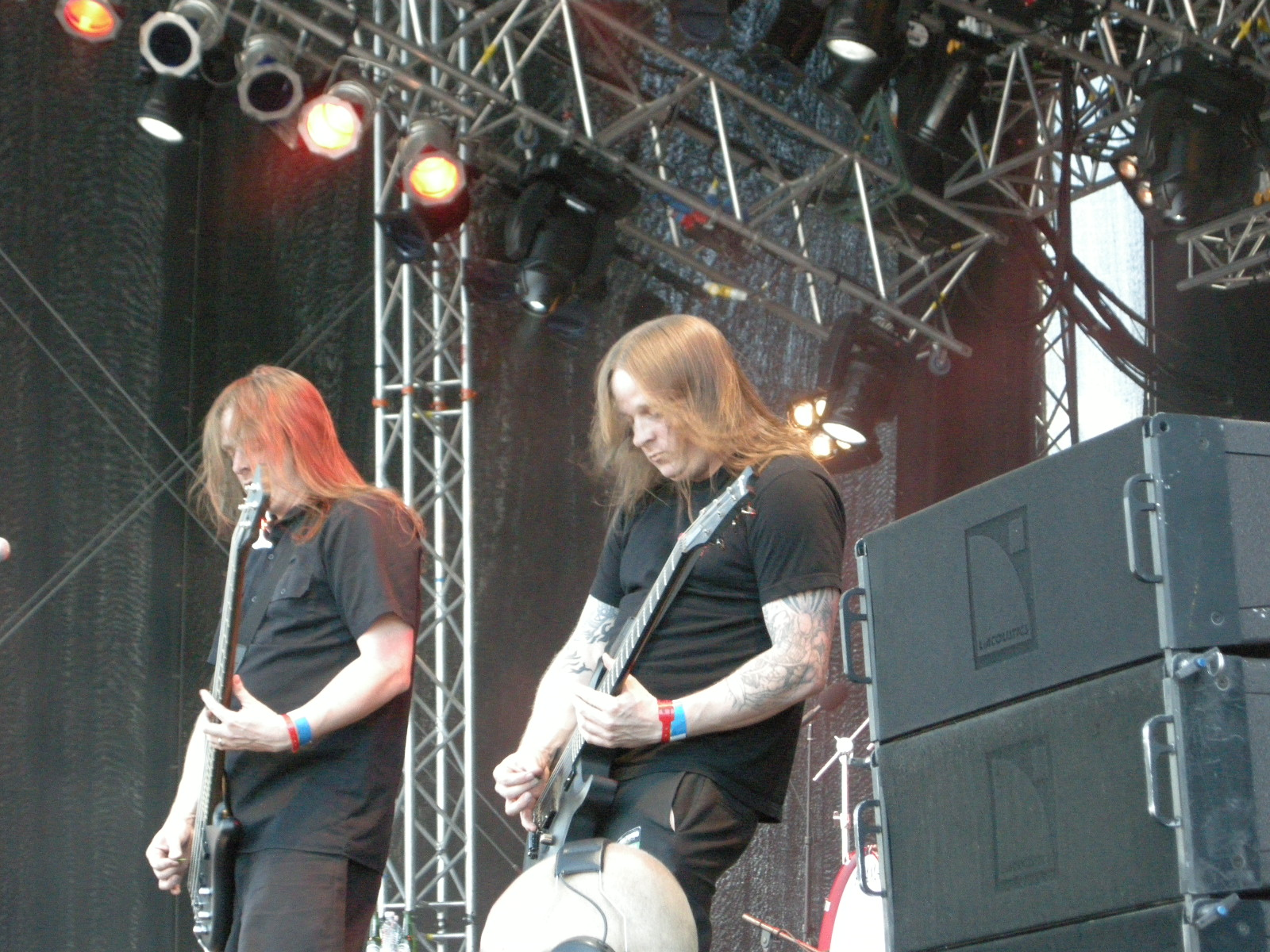
Björler (right) with his brother Jonas, 2009

=== At the Gates (studio albums) ===
- Gardens of Grief (EP) – 1991
- The Red in the Sky Is Ours – 1992
- With Fear I Kiss the Burning Darkness – 1993
- Terminal Spirit Disease – 1994
- Slaughter of the Soul – 1995
- At War with Reality – 2014
- The Ghost of a Future Dead - 2026

=== The Haunted (studio albums) ===
- The Haunted – 1998
- The Haunted Made Me Do It – 2000
- One Kill Wonder – 2003
- rEVOLVEr – 2004
- The Dead Eye – 2006
- Versus – 2008
- Unseen – 2011

=== Anders Björler (solo) ===
- Antikythera – 2013 (Razzia Notes / Sony Records)
- Dreaming of Insomnia – 2015 (two-track digital single)

=== Other appearances ===
- Infestation "When Sanity Ends" demo, 1990 (guitar)
- Terror "Terror" demo, 1994 (guitar)
- Darkest Hour "Hidden Hands of a Sadist Nation" 2003 (guest guitar solo, track 5)
- Annihilator "Metal", 2007 (guest guitar solo, track 5)
- Evocation "Dead Calm Chaos" 2008 (guest guitar solo)
- Shadow "Forever Chaos" 2008 (guest guitar solo)
- ColdTears "Ocean" 2012 (guest guitar solo)
- Akani "Santa Muerte" 2014 EP (guitar)
- Pagandom "Hurt as a Shadow" CD, 2016 (guitar)
- Pagandom "Spiritual Psycho 30" digital single, 2020 (guitar solo)

== Filmography ==
- The Haunted – The Drowning (promo video, 2006) (filmed, directed, edited)
- Dark Tranquillity – We are the Void (making-of video series, 2009) (filmed, directed, edited)
- Road Kill: On the Road with 'The Haunted' (documentary, DVD, 2010) (filmed, directed, edited)
- Under a Serpent Sun – The Story of At the Gates (documentary, DVD, 2010) (filmed, directed, edited)
- At the Gates – Live at Wacken 2008 (live DVD, 2010) (editing)
- The Haunted – Live in Amsterdam 2009 (live DVD) (producer)
- Meshuggah in India (documentary & live, DVD) (filmed, directed, edited)
- In Flames – Sounds of a Playground Fading (in-the-studio video series, 2011) (filmed, directed, edited)
- The Haunted – No Ghost (promo video, 2011) (editing)
- Meshuggah – Konstrukting the Koloss (making-of documentary, 2012) (editing)
