= Adrian Erlandsson =

Swedish drummer

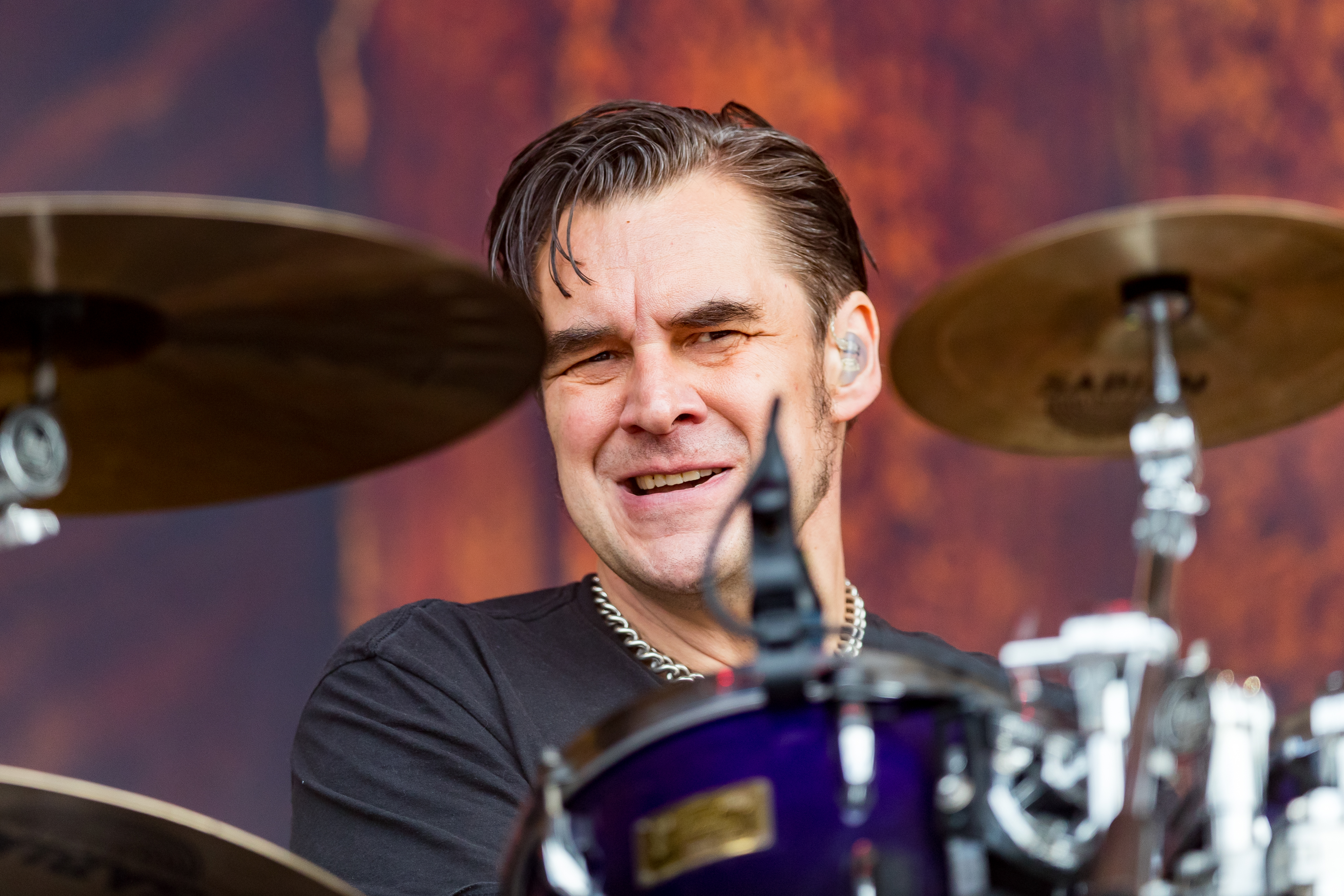
- Erlandsson with At the Gates in 2022

Background information
- Also known as: The Swede, El Podrido
- Born: Adrian Paul Erlandsson; 27 October 1970 (age 55); Malmö, Sweden
- Genres: Melodic death metal, heavy metal, extreme metal, death metal, rock, black metal, crust punk, D-beat
- Occupation: Drummer
- Years active: 1981–present
- Website: paradiselost.co.uk

Adrian Paul Erlandsson (born 27 October 1970) is a Swedish heavy metal drummer who is a member of At the Gates (1990–present), The Haunted (1996–1999, 2013–present), and Nemhain (2006–present).

He has also been a member of H.E.A.L. (1994–1996), Hyperhug (1994–1996), Decameron (1997), Cradle of Filth (1999–2006), Needleye (2006–?), Brujeria (2006–2013), Netherbird (2007–2010), and Paradise Lost (2009–2016).

Erlandsson currently resides in London where he owns a photo studio.

== Biography ==
Erlandsson was born in Malmö to a Swedish father with Romanian roots. He's the older brother of Daniel Erlandsson, the drummer of Arch Enemy, and ex-Carcass. They both grew up together in Sweden and started playing drums at a very young age but with Adrian's career beginning in 1981 at the age of 11 after getting his first drum kit, and started to play with friends began playing covers of classic rock songs. He got his brother into drumming as Daniel admits "If it wasn't for him I probably wouldn't be playing today." They also started playing with their music teacher at school, and eventually began to write their own songs and formed a band.

Inspired by Judas Priest, he formed the Black Nuns which evolved into Berits Polisonger playing until 1986. There then followed a series of other bands including thrash metal band Penance in 1987. Erlandsson went on to form Penance, a thrash metal band, which never recorded a demo, although they did record some rehearsal tracks.

As soon as he could hold down his first beat, Adrian Erlandsson and a friend formed a band and covered classic rock songs. The first song they learned was Joan Jett's "I Love Rock 'n' Roll" They soon gathered more members and began playing covers by bands like Def Leppard, Dokken, The Exploited, GBH, Thin Lizzy and Twisted Sister.

== Bands ==
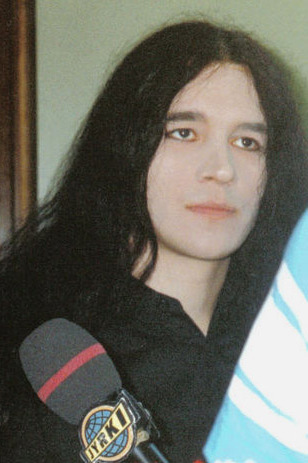
Erlandsson in 2000

=== At the Gates ===
Erlandsson then went to University in Gothenburg, where in 1990, he joined the Swedish death metal band At the Gates. He was the band's drummer until they broke up, and received critical and fan praise for his speed and precision. When asked what each at the Gates member contributes to the group's overall sound, band member Anders Björler said that Erlandsson, "hit the drums hard."

In 2007, At the Gates reunited for some festival shows in the summer of 2008 and a headlining US tour which was dubbed Suicidal Final Tour and at the time, mentioned that they would disband after the 2008 tour. In December 2010, the band reunited again, and released their fifth studio album At War with Reality in October 2014.

=== Terror ===
He was a founding member of the supergroup Terror in the Spring of 1994 with Jon Nödtveidt and his At the Gates bandmates, Anders Björler & Jonas Björler. The band existed for a few weeks but released Demo '94 in April 1994.

=== The Haunted ===
The day after the first demise of At the Gates, being 27 July 1996, Erlandsson formed The Haunted with Patrik Jensen. Erlandsson remained in the band before departing in June 1999 due to eventually not liking the deal the band had with Earache Records.

Later on in 2012, when Per Möller Jensen (the drummer who replaced Erlandsson back in '99) quit The Haunted, the remainder of the band who had also lost 2 other members other than Möller, had difficulty for a year to search for a new drummer, until Patrik Jensen phoned Erlandsson in April 2013 to rejoin. When Erlandsson asked Jensen as to who else was in the band, he responded with new members Marco Aro and Ola Englund. Having knowing those members and respecting them at their musical abilities, Erlandsson immediately jumped at the chance to join and put his musical input with them. On 26 June 2013, The Haunted released a YouTube video titled "The Haunted returns with a revamped line-up!" which officially announced the returns of both Erlandsson and vocalist Marco Aro.

=== Cradle of Filth ===
Erlandsson mentioned how he was hired by Cradle of Filth stating:

I got approached by Cradle of Filth at the Dynamo gig '99 where we played with The Haunted. 2 weeks into June I was asked to join Cradle of Filth in England, mainly to help them out with some session recording and a few gigs… Since it worked so well… I ended up joining the band on a permanent basis…

— Adrian Erlandsson

In 2006, according to an official Roadrunner press release, Erlandsson left with the intention of devoting his energies to his two side projects, Nemhain and the since-defunct Needleye. "I have enjoyed my time with Cradle but it is now time to move on. I feel I am going out on a high as Thornography is definitely our best album to date".

=== Nemhain ===
Erlandsson formed Nemhain with his wife Amber Erlandsson, known as a fetish model under the name Morrigan Hel, in March 2006. The band returns Erlandsson to his roots as a rock drummer. Nemhain recorded its debut album From the Ashes in Studio Fredman during the late spring 2008 due for a release in April 2009.

=== Paradise Lost ===
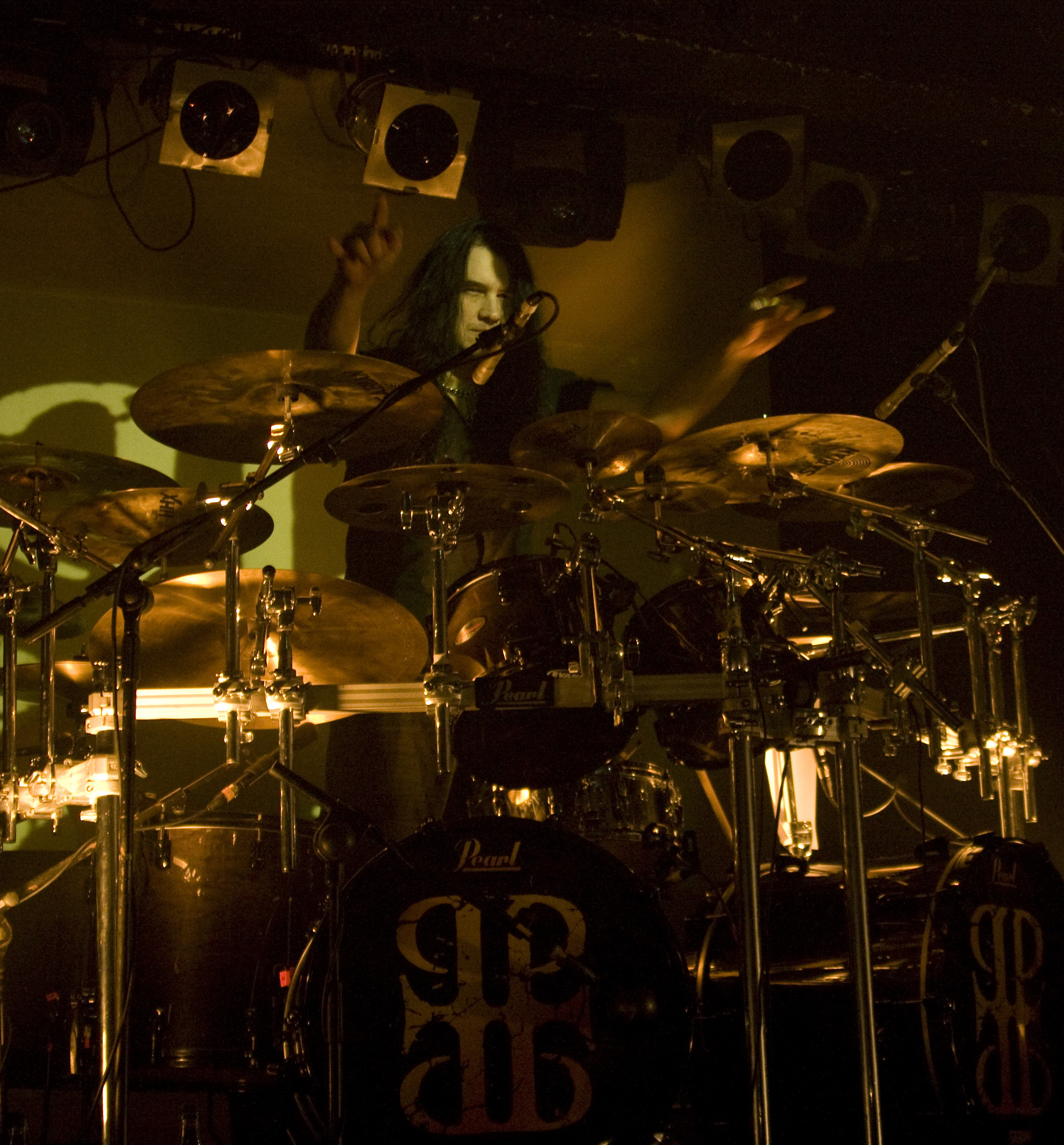
Erlandsson with Paradise Lost in 2009

In March 2009, Erlandsson joined the British gothic metal band Paradise Lost under Jeff Walker's recommendation. Although he was hired after the recording Faith Divides Us Death Unites Us, he was in the music video The Rise of Denial.

Throughout random times from 2009 to 2014, Erlandsson was unable to play with the band due to commitments with his other bands most notably At the Gates. In June 2016, he announced on his Facebook page that he will no longer play drums for Paradise Lost due to other band commitments.

=== Vallenfyre ===
In 2010, he was hired again to be in another band of Gregory Mackintosh from Paradise Lost called Vallenfyre. In 2014, just like in Paradise Lost, Erlandsson has been unable to play with the band due to commitments with his other bands.

=== Other projects ===
Erlandsson has also played in Nifelheim. While Adrian was in Cradle of Filth, due to the band's poor reputation in the black metal scene, he was fired from Nifelheim, who said it was "like a very bad, bad dream" to have had "a drummer who plays in CRADLE OF WIMPS now", and that he was "a schooled drummer" but "had problems to understand the most twisted and sickest riffs".

In late 2007, Erlandsson recorded the drums for a three track EP for London band Green River Project.

The year 2008 saw Erlandsson fill in for Deathstars on their tour in Europe supporting Korn.

In 2012, Erlandsson took part in a still unreleased and secretive project with the band HIYF. (needs more details)

== Equipment ==
=== Sabian Cymbals ===
- 19 Paragon China
- 15 HHX Xcelerator hats
- 20 AAX Iso crash
- 10 AAX Ozone splash
- 10 AA Mini holy china
- 19 Artisan crash
- 20 AAX Vcrash
- 22 HH Power bell ride
- 19 Holy China

Left to right. Date: April 2021

=== Drumsticks ===
- Vic Firth Rock Nylon Tip. (At The Gates signature version).

=== Hardware ===
- Monolit Czarcie Kopyto

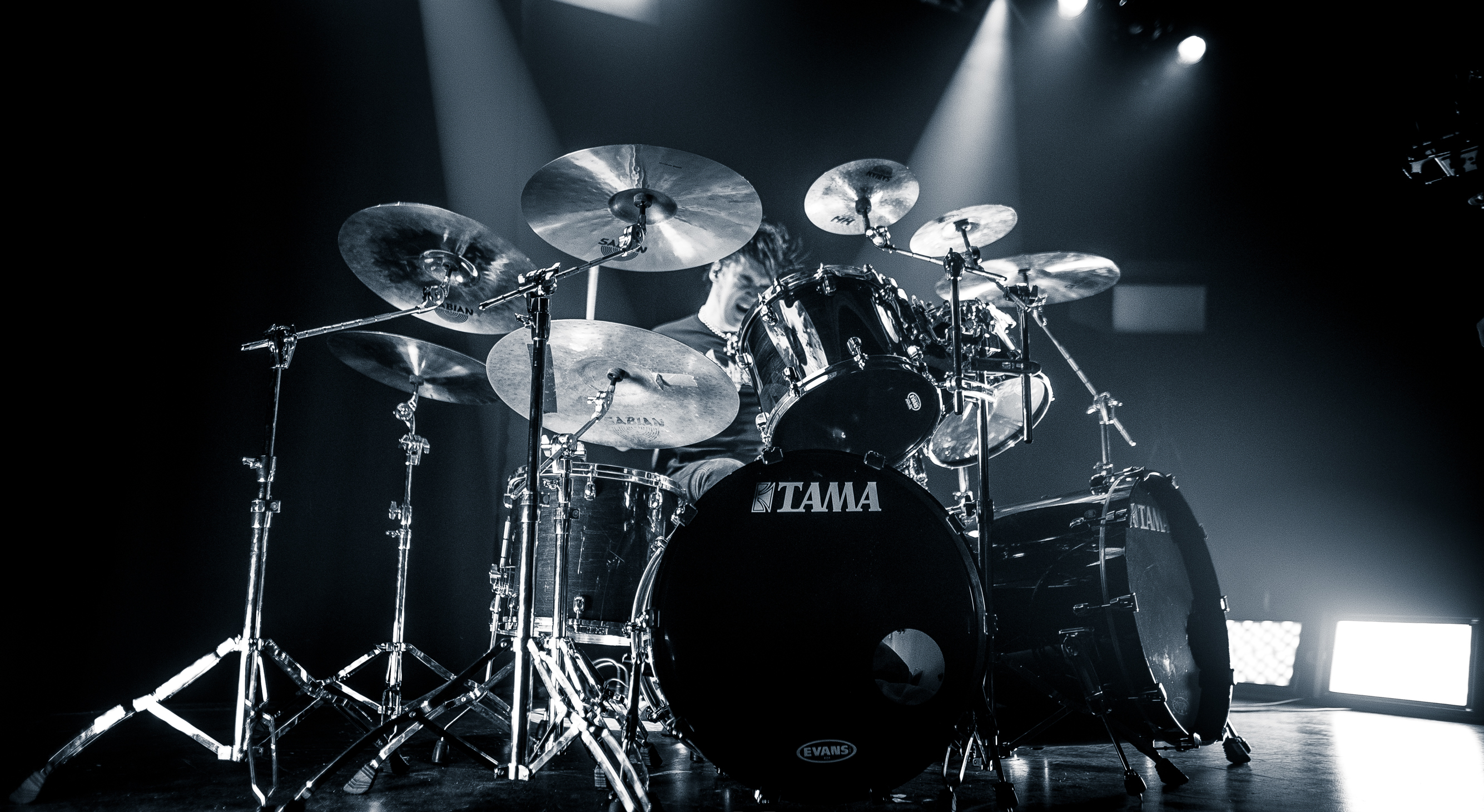
Adrian Erlandsson playing his drum kit 2017

=== TAMA Starclassic Bubinga ===
- BD: 22x18
- T1: 10x8
- T2: 12x9
- T3: 14x11 (mostly only at recording sessions).
- FT1: 16X16
- FT2: 18x16
- SD: 14x6.5 Tama Bell Brass Snare (usually with Die Cast hoops instead of Brass Hoops)

Date: April 2021

=== PEARL Reference Series ===
- BD: 22X18
- T1: 10X8
- T2: 12X9
- T3: 14X11
- FT1: 16X16
- FT2: 18X16
- SD: 14X6.5

=== Evans Accessories ===
- AF Patch – Kevlar Single Pedal
- EMAD Onyx Batter Drumhead
- EC Reverse Dot Snare Drumhead
- Glass 500 Snare Side Drumhead
- Puresound Blasters Series Snare Wires
- EC2 Clear Drumhead
- Resonant Black Drumhead
- Magnetic Head Key
- Compact Flip Key
- Torque Drum Key

== Discography ==
Release	Band	Member	Year
Gardens of Grief	At the Gates	Current	1991
The Red in the Sky Is Ours	At the Gates	Current	1992
With Fear I Kiss the Burning Darkness	At the Gates	Current	1993
Demo '94	Terror	Former	1994
Terminal Spirit Disease	At the Gates	Current	1994
There Can Only be One	H.E.A.L.	Former	1994
Slaughter of the Soul	At the Gates	Current	1995
Profithysteril	Skitsystem	Former	1995
Distortion To Hell Again!! Vol.2 (The Demo Series)	Skitsystem	Former	1995
Cursed to Tour	At the Gates	Current	1996
Shivas Ohm	H.E.A.L.	Former	1996 (Recorded during or before that year, but unreleased)
Demo '97	The Haunted	Current	1997
The Haunted	The Haunted	Current	1998
From the Cradle to Enslave (Track 2)	Cradle of Filth	Former	1999
Midian	Cradle of Filth	Former	2000
Peek A Boo (ft. Cradle of Filth) – Born Again Anti Christian	Christian Death	Guest	2000
Her Ghost In The Fog / Dance Macabre	Cradle of Filth	Former	2000
Her Ghost In The Fog (Edit) – Dynamit Vol. 24	Cradle of Filth	Former	2000
Her Ghost In The Fog (Edit) – Rock Sound Volume 47	Cradle of Filth	Former	2000
Her Ghost In The Fog – Off Road Tracks Vol. 37	Cradle of Filth	Former	2000
Her Ghost In The Fog (Edit) – CD Side 1	Cradle of Filth	Former	2000
Her Ghost In The Fog (Edit) – Sonic Seducer Cold Hands Seduction Vol. VIII	Cradle of Filth	Former	2000
Her Ghost In The Fog (Edit) – Elegy – Numéro 12	Cradle of Filth	Former	2000
Bitter Suites to Succubi	Cradle of Filth	Former	2001
Heavy Left-Handed and Candid	Cradle of Filth	Former	2001
Peaceville Classic Cuts	At the Gates	Current	2001
Eleven Burial Masses / Live Bait for the Dead	Cradle of Filth	Former	2002
Lovecraft & Witch Hearts	Cradle of Filth	Former	2002
Allt E Skitl	Skitsystem	Former	2002
Suicidal Final Art	At the Gates	Current	2002
Babalon A.D. – So Glad for the Madness	Cradle of Filth	Former	2003
Off Road Tracks Vol. 66	Cradle of Filth	Former	2003
Damnation and a Day	Cradle of Filth	Former	2003
Mannequin	Cradle of Filth	Former	2003
Cradle of Filth	Cradle of Filth	Former	2004
Nymphetamine	Cradle of Filth	Former	2004
Gilded Cunt – Rock Tribune: International Heavy Rock Gratis CD September 2004	Cradle of Filth	Former	2004
Gilded Cunt – Orkus Compilation 3	Cradle of Filth	Former	2004
Medusa And Hemlock – Off Road Tracks Vol. 84 Oktober 2004	Cradle of Filth	Former	2004
Liszt	12 Ton Method	Former	2005
Devil Woman	Cradle of Filth	Former	2005
Peace Through Superior Firepower	Cradle of Filth	Former	2005
Blinded by Fear – Death Metal Special	At the Gates	Current	2005
Thornographic	Cradle of Filth	Former	2006
Thornography	Cradle of Filth	Former	2006
Temptation & Dirge Inferno	Cradle of Filth	Former	2006
Ode to None	Needleye	Former	2006–?
Lighthouse Eternal (Laterna Magika)	Netherbird	Former	2007
Auf den Spiralnebeln	Samsas Traum	Former	2007
Heiliges Herz – Das Schwert deiner Sonne	Samsas Traum	Former	2007
The Art of Not Falling	12 Ton Method	Former	2008
Debilador	Brujeria	Former	2008
The Ghost Collector (Tracks 1–9)	Netherbird	Guest	2008
Night Electric Night (Gold Edition) (Track 14)	Deathstars	Guest	2009
Warning Shots (Disc 1: Tracks 1, 5, 8, 14, 16 & Disc 2: Tracks 8–12)	The Haunted	Former	2009
Promo 2009	Netherbird	Former	2009
Resplendent Grotesque	Code	Guest	2009
Sovereign (Tracks 10, 11)	Tenet	Guest	2009
Purgatory Unleashed – Live at Wacken	At the Gates	Current	2010
Monument Black Colossal	Netherbird	Former	2010
Live in Kraków	At the Gates	Current	2010
From The Ashes	Nemhain	Current	2010
Purgatory Unleashed – Live at Wacken 2008	At the Gates	Current	2011
Farewell to Graveland (Tracks 3–6, 8)	Martyr Lucifer	Guest	2011
Desecration	Vallenfyre	Former	2011
A Fragile King	Vallenfyre	Former	2011
Draconian Times MMXI	Paradise Lost	Former	2011
Crucify	Paradise Lost	Former	2012
The Last Fallen Saviour	Paradise Lost	Former	2012
Tragic Idol	Paradise Lost	Former	2012
Shards (Tracks 11–13)	Martyr Lucifer	Guest	2013
Tragic Illusion 25 (Tracks 1–4, 13, 14)	Paradise Lost	Former	2013
Live at the Roundhouse	Paradise Lost	Former	2013
Eye of the Storm	The Haunted	Current	2014
Captor of Sin / Mandatory Suicide	At the Gates	Current	2014
Splinters	Vallenfyre	Former	2014
Exit Wounds	The Haunted	Current	2014
At War with Reality	At the Gates	Current	2014
The Plague Within	Paradise Lost	Former	2015
Strength in Numbers	The Haunted	Current	2017
To Drink from the Night Itself	At the Gates	Current	2018
The Nightmare of Being	At the Gates	Current	2021
Songs of last resort	The Haunted	Current	2025
