= Revolver (The Haunted album) =

rEVOLVEr

Studio album by The Haunted
- Released: 18 October 2004
- Recorded: February–March 2004 (Studio Fredman)
- Genre: Thrash metal, melodic death metal, groove metal
- Length: 47:11
- Label: Century Media
- Producer: Fredrik Nordström, Patrik J. Sten & The Haunted

The Haunted chronology
One Kill Wonder (2003)	rEVOLVEr (2004)	The Dead Eye (2006)

Professional ratings
Review scores
Source	Rating
AllMusic	link
Blabbermouth.net	8/10 stars
Chronicles of Chaos	10/10 stars
The Metal Observer	9/10 stars
Metal Rules	4.5/5 stars
Metal Storm	9/10 stars
PopMatters	Positive

Revolver (stylized as rEVOLVEr) is the fourth studio album by Swedish heavy metal band The Haunted. It was released on 18 October 2004.

After having been absent for the previous two studio albums, Peter Dolving was once again back in the band and provided the vocals for rEVOLVEr. He would remain with the band until he left once again in 2012.

As the title on the album indicates with its stylized typography (i.e. with the word "EVOLVE" printed in upper case letters between the two lower case r's), the band made a conscious decision to tweak (or "evolve") its songwriting on this album. As a result, rEVOLVEr contains some elements that were absent on previous The Haunted albums. Although the album still contains examples of the band's familiar thrash metal sound (e.g. "No Compromise", "Sabotage", "Sweet Relief"), it features considerably more mid-paced riffing (e.g. "99", "Burnt to a Shell", "Fire Alive") than in any of their previous albums. Two of the tracks even have ballad elements interspersed in them ("Abysmal" and "My Shadow"). Also notable is that rEVOLVEr has quite a few instances of clean singing in it, although the vast majority of the vocal tracking was still done in The Haunted's traditional hardcore/metalcore style of screaming.

A limited edition digipak of this CD contained two bonus tracks, and different artwork.

A music video was made for "No Compromise" which featured Barney Greenway.

== Track listing ==
All lyrics are written by Peter Dolving.

No.	Title	Music	Length
1.	"No Compromise"	A. Björler	3:44
2.	"99"	Patrik Jensen, A. Björler	3:58
3.	"Abysmal"	A. Björler	4:50
4.	"Sabotage"	A. Björler	2:36
5.	"All Against All"	A. Björler	4:34
6.	"Sweet Relief"	A. Björler	3:28
7.	"Burnt to a Shell"	Jensen	3:47
8.	"Who Will Decide"	Jonas Björler, A. Björler	3:29
9.	"Nothing Right"	Jensen	3:47
10.	"Liquid Burns"	J. Björler, A. Björler	4:45
11.	"My Shadow"	A. Björler	6:55
Total length:			47:11

Limited edition
No.	Title	Music	Length
1.	"No Compromise"	Anders Björler	3:44
2.	"99"	Patrik Jensen, A. Björler	3:58
3.	"Abysmal"	A. Björler	4:50
4.	"Sabotage"	A. Björler	2:36
5.	"All Against All"	A. Björler	4:34
6.	"Sweet Relief"	A. Björler	3:28
7.	"Burnt to a Shell"	Jensen	3:47
8.	"Who Will Decide"	Jonas Björler, A. Björler	3:29
9.	"Nothing Right"	Jensen	3:47
10.	"Liquid Burns"	J. Björler, A. Björler	4:45
11.	"Fire Alive"	A. Björler	3:43
12.	"Smut King"	Jensen	3:07
13.	"My Shadow"	A. Björler	6:55
Total length:			53:61

Japanese edition
No.	Title	Music	Length
1.	"No Compromise"	Anders Björler	3:44
2.	"99"	Patrik Jensen, A. Björler	3:58
3.	"Abysmal"	A. Björler	4:50
4.	"Sabotage"	A. Björler	2:36
5.	"All Against All"	A. Björler	4:34
6.	"Sweet Relief"	A. Björler	3:28
7.	"Burnt to a Shell"	Jensen	3:47
8.	"Who Will Decide"	Jonas Björler, A. Björler	3:29
9.	"Out of Reach"	Dolving, A. Björler, J. Björler	5:08
10.	"Nothing Right"	Jensen	3:47
11.	"Fire Alive"	A. Björler	3:43
12.	"Liquid Burns"	J. Björler, A. Björler	4:45
13.	"My Shadow"	A. Björler	6:55
Total length:			55:62

- The limited edition of the album contains the bonus tracks "Fire Alive" and "Smut King" at tracks 11 and 12, respectively. "My Shadow" was moved to track 13.

- The Japanese release contains the bonus track "Out of Reach" at track 9, respectively. "Nothing Right" was moved to track 10. The bonus track "Smut King" is not on this edition. However, "Fire Alive" still remains at track 11, therefore keeping the album at 13 tracks.

== Release history ==
Region	Date
North America	19 October 2004

== Personnel ==
- Peter Dolving – vocals
- Anders Björler – rhythm and lead guitar
- Jonas Björler – bass, backing vocals
- Patrik Jensen – rhythm guitar
- Per Möller Jensen – drums

Guest

- Lou Koller (Sick of It All) – co-vocals on "Who Will Decide"
