= Jonas Björler =

Swedish bassist

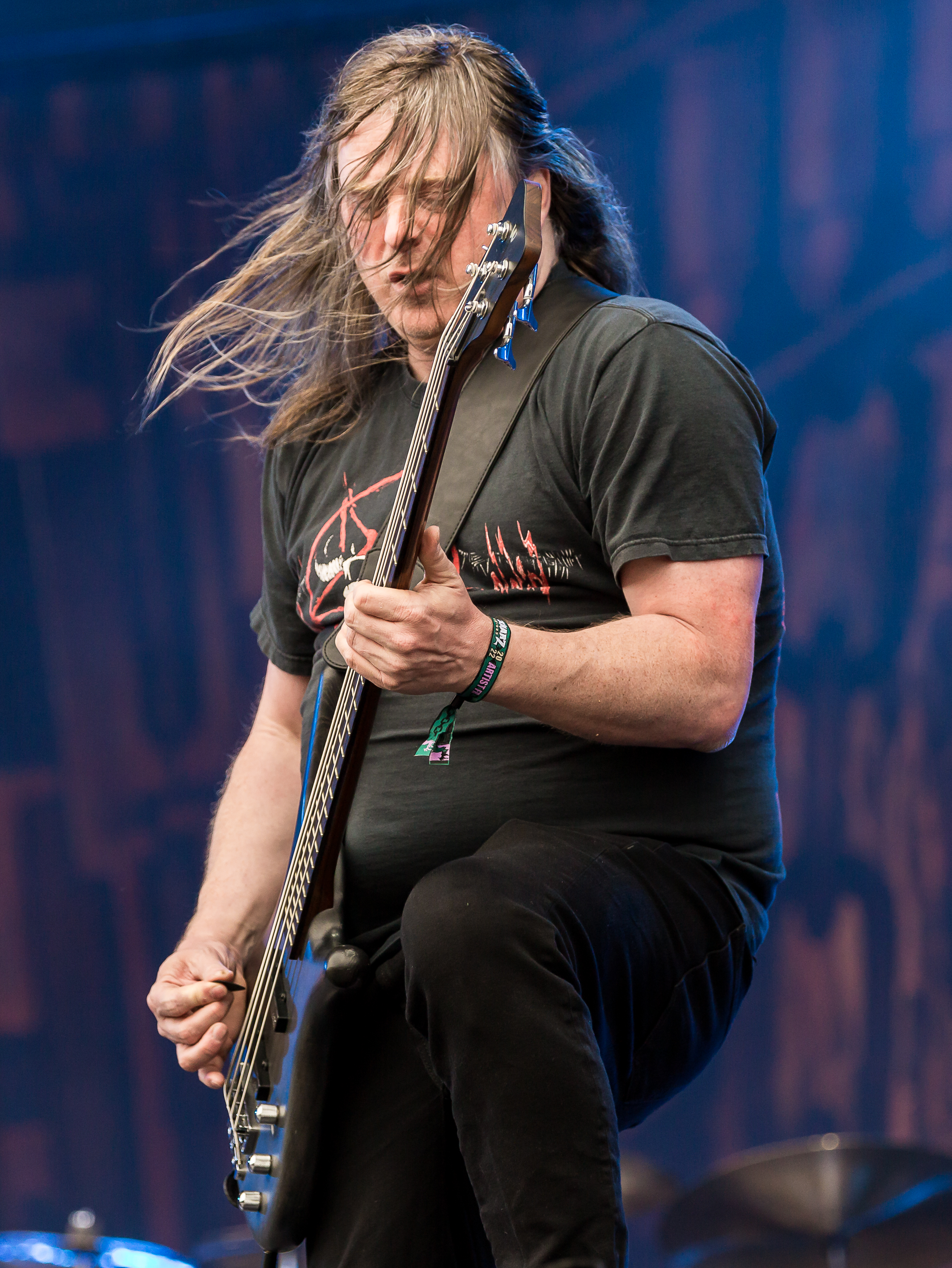
- Björler in 2022

Background information
- Birth name: Jonas Fredrik Björler
- Born: 26 February 1973 (age 52)
- Origin: Sweden
- Genres: Melodic death metal, thrash metal, groove metal
- Occupation: Musician
- Instrument: Bass guitar
- Member of: At the Gates, The Haunted

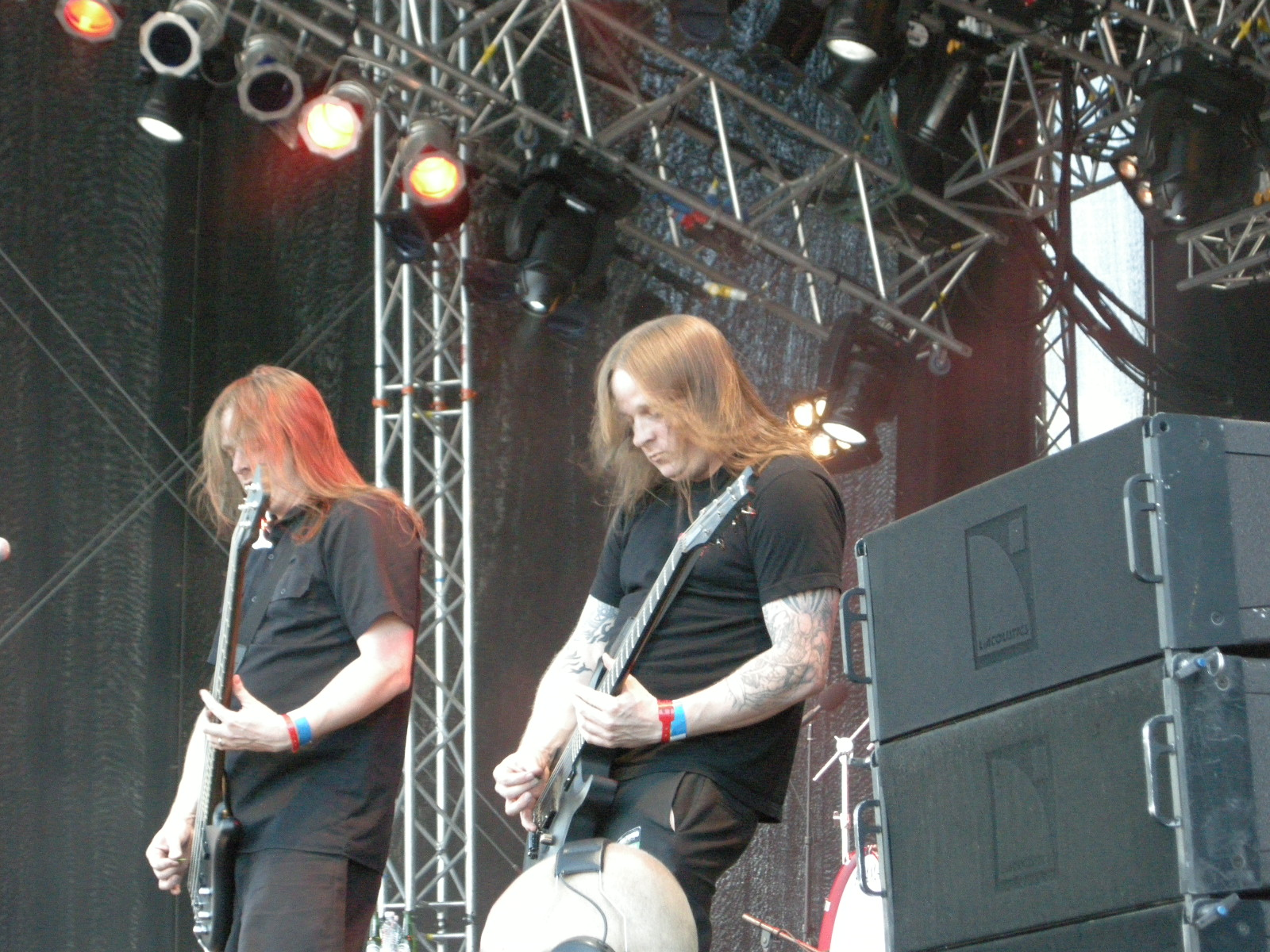
Björler (left) with his brother Anders, 2009

Jonas Fredrik Björler (born 26 February 1973) is a Swedish musician who has been the longtime bassist for the melodic death metal bands At the Gates and The Haunted. He was formerly in the bands Demolition, Infestation and Terror.

== Discography ==
=== Demolition ===
- Hordes of Evil (demo) (1987)

=== Infestation ===
- When Sanity Ends (demo) (1990)

=== At the Gates ===
Björler was the original drummer of the band due to being the drummer of the previous band Infestation, but it was soon discovered that he wasn't able to drum for the band and became their bassist instead. Along with Tomas Lindberg and Adrian Erlandsson, he is one of the original members left in the band. His twin brother Anders Björler has been in the band off and on and is also an original member of the band.

- Gardens of Grief (EP) (1991)
- The Red in the Sky Is Ours (1992)
- With Fear I Kiss the Burning Darkness (1993)
- Terminal Spirit Disease (1994)
- Slaughter of the Soul (1995)
- Suicidal Final Art (compilation) (2001)
- At War with Reality (2014)
- To Drink from the Night Itself (2018)
- The Nightmare of Being (2021)

=== Terror ===
- Demo '94 (1994)

=== The Haunted ===
Formed after the split-up of At the Gates in 1996. Björler and his twin brother are founding members together with Patrik Jensen and Adrian Erlandsson.

- Demo '97 (1997)
- The Haunted (1998)
- The Haunted Made Me Do It (2000)
- Live Rounds in Tokyo (2001)
- Caught on Tape (2002) DVD
- One Kill Wonder (2003)
- Revolver (2004)
- The Dead Eye (2006)
- Versus (2008)
- Unseen (2011)
- Exit Wounds (2014)
- Strength in Numbers (2017)
- Songs of Last Resort (2025)
