= At the Gates discography =

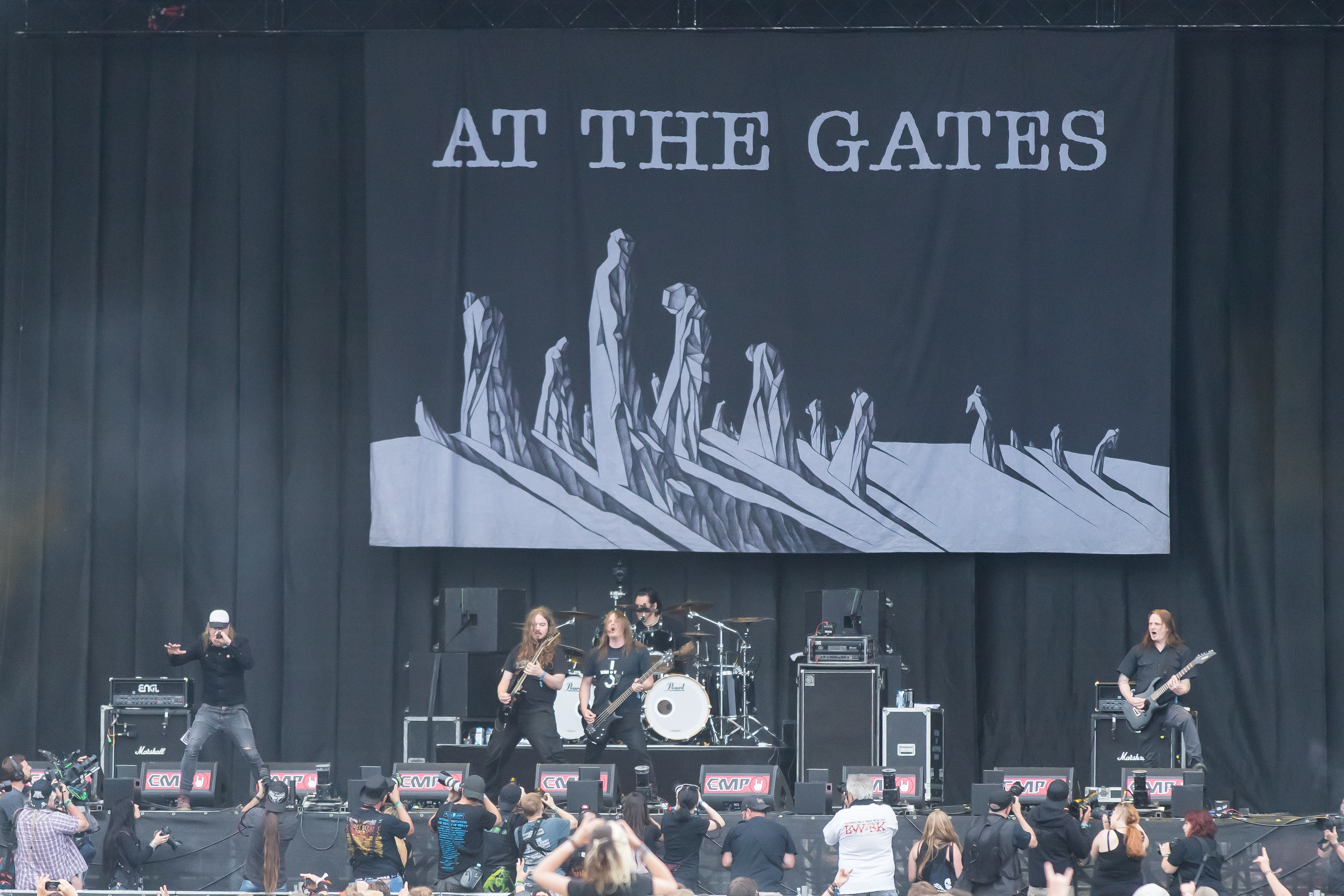
- At the Gates live at Summer Breeze Open Air in 2016
- Studio albums: 8
- EPs: 3
- Live albums: 1
- Compilation albums: 1
- Video albums: 1
- Music videos: 17

The discography of At the Gates, a Swedish melodic death metal band from Gothenburg formed in 1990, consists of eight studio albums, three extended plays, one live album, four split albums, one video album and seventeen music videos.

== Albums ==
=== Studio albums ===
List of studio albums, with selected chart positions
Title	Album details	Peak chart positions											Sales
Title	Album details	SWE	AUT	BEL (FL)	BEL (WA)	FIN	FRA	GER	JPN	SWI	UK	US	Sales
The Red in the Sky Is Ours	Released: 27 July 1992; Label: Peaceville; Formats: CD, LP, CS, digital download	—	—	—	—	—	—	—	—	—	—	—	
With Fear I Kiss the Burning Darkness	Released: 7 May 1993; Label: Peaceville; Formats: CD, LP, CS, digital download	—	—	—	—	—	—	—	—	—	—	—	
Terminal Spirit Disease	Released: 18 July 1994; Label: Peaceville; Formats: CD, LP, CS, digital download	—	—	—	—	—	—	—	—	—	—	—	
Slaughter of the Soul	Released: 14 November 1995; Label: Earache; Formats: CD, CD+DVD, CS, LP, digital download	—	—	—	—	—	—	—	200	—	—	—	
At War with Reality	Released: 28 October 2014; Label: Century Media; Formats: CD, CD+DVD, CS, LP, digital download	3	39	78	162	15	175	25	74	51	132	53	US: 7,700+
To Drink from the Night Itself	Released: 18 May 2018; Label: Century Media; Formats: CD, LP, digital download	13	22	39	132	18	148	10	76	25	—	—	
The Nightmare of Being	Released: 2 July 2021; Label: Century Media; Formats: CD, LP, digital download	20	18	84	115	21	—	8	—	12	—	—	
The Ghost of a Future Dead	Released: 24 April 2026; Label: Century Media; Formats: CD, LP, digital download	1	9	85	35	18	— (Note: The Ghost of a Future Dead did not enter the official French Top Albums chart, but peaked at number 44 on the French Physical Albums chart.)	8	—	9	—	—	
"—" denotes a release that did not chart.

=== Compilation albums ===
Title	Album details
Suicidal Final Art	Released: 26 June 2001; Label: Peaceville; Formats: CD

=== Live albums ===
List of live albums, with selected chart positions
Title	Album details	Peak chart positions
Title	Album details	GRE
Purgatory Unleashed – Live at Wacken	Released: 22 March 2010; Label: Earache; Format: CD	25
"—" denotes a release that did not chart.

=== Split albums ===
Title	Album details	Notes
Cursed to Tour	Released: 1996; Label: Earache; Formats: CD	Split with Napalm Death.
Gardens of Grief / In the Embrace of Evil	Released: 12 June 2001; Label: Century Media; Formats: CD	Split with Grotesque.
At the Gates / Decapitated	Released: 19 April 2014; Label: Earache; Formats: 7"	Split with Decapitated, released on Record Store Day 2014.
We Are Connected / Language of the Dead	Released: 6 April 2015; Label: Century Media; Formats: 7"	Split with Voivod.

=== Video albums ===
List of video albums, with selected chart positions
Title	Album details	Peak chart positions	
Title	Album details	FIN	SWE
The Flames of the End	Released: 22 February 2010; Label: Earache; Format: DVD	3	1
"—" denotes a release that did not chart.

== Extended plays ==
Title	EP details
Gardens of Grief	Released: 1991; Label: Dolores Recordings; Formats: CD
The Mirror Black	Released: 11 January 2019; Label: Century Media; Formats: LP
With the Pantheons Blind	Released: 19 January 2019; Label: Century Media; Formats: digital download

== Music videos ==
List of music videos, showing year released and director
Year	Title	Director(s)
1992	"Kingdom Gone"	Wargren / Schönbeck
1993	"The Burning Darkness"	Antonio Tublén
1994	"Terminal Spirit Disease"	Antonio Tublén
1995	"Blinded by Fear"	—N/a
2014	"Death and the Labyrinth"	Patric Ullaeus
2014	"Heroes and Tombs"	Costin Chioreanu
2015	"The Book of Sand (The Abomination)"	Costin Chioreanu
2015	"The Night Eternal"	Costin Chioreanu
2016	"The Circular Ruins" (live)	Anders Björler (edited by)
2018	"To Drink from the Night Itself"	Patric Ullaeus
2018	"A Stare Bound in Stone"	Costin Chioreanu
2018	"Daggers of Black Haze"	Costin Chioreanu
2019	"The Mirror Black" (featuring Rob Miller)	Costin Chioreanu
2021	"Spectre of Extinction"	Patric Ullaeus
2021	"The Paradox"	Patric Ullaeus
2021	"The Fall Into Time"	Costin Chioreanu
2021	"Cosmic Pessimism"	Costin Chioreanu
