= List of rhythm guitarists =

The following is a list of notable rhythm guitarists, arranged in ascending alphabetical order of last name. Rhythm guitarists perform a combination of two functions: they provide all or part of the rhythmic pulse in conjunction with other rhythm section instruments (bass and drums) and they provide all or part of the harmony, i.e. the chords.

For a list of lead guitarists see List of lead guitarists. Only add names here if the person has their own article on Wikipedia, please. Anything else will be removed.

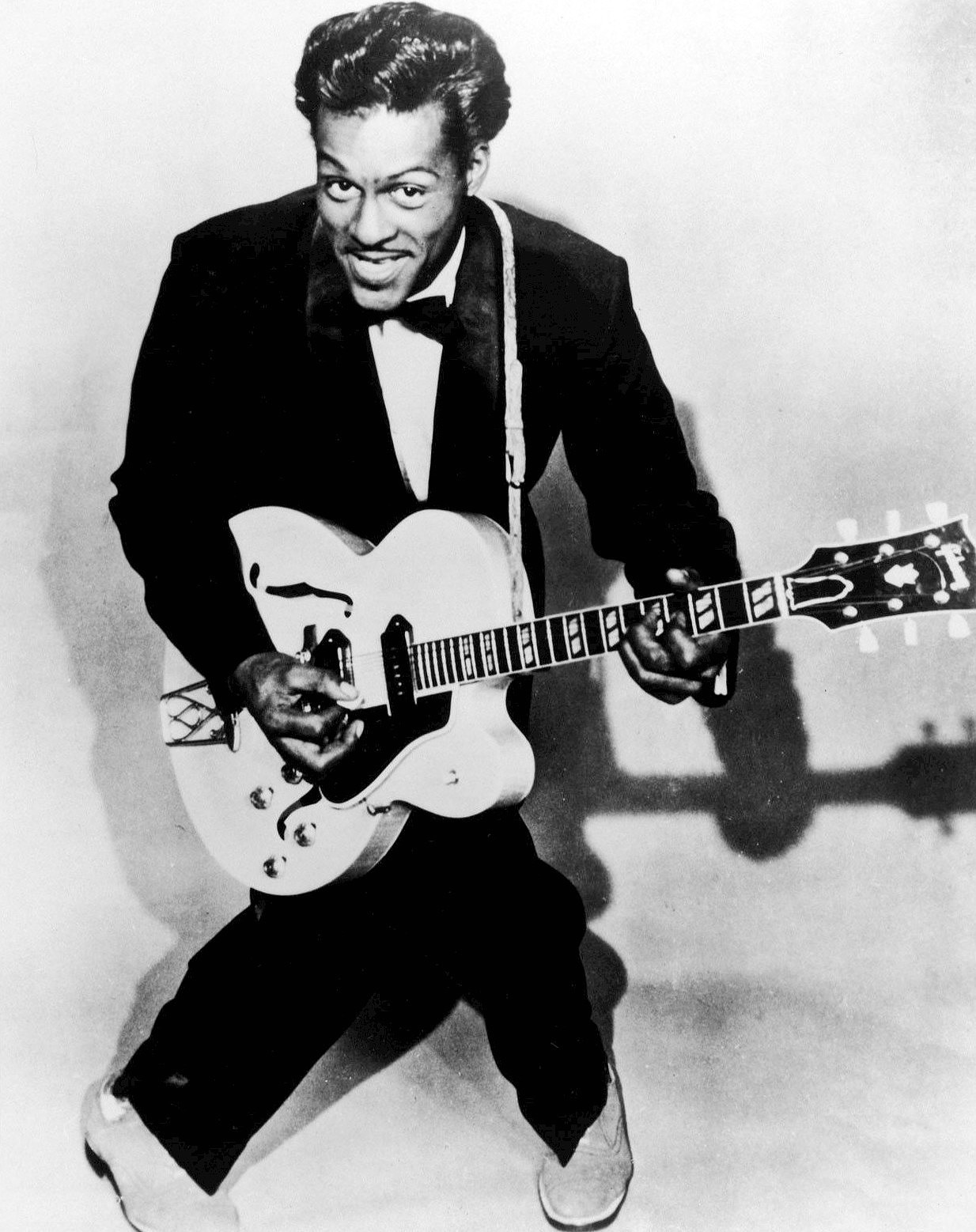
Chuck Berry is an influential rhythm guitarist

== A ==
- Bryan Adams
- Doug Aldrich (Whitesnake)
- Christopher Amott (Arch Enemy)
- Michael Amott (Arch Enemy)
- Gem Archer (Oasis)
- Mark Arm (Mudhoney)
- Joan Armatrading
- Billie Joe Armstrong (Green Day, Pinhead Gunpowder)
- Emily Armstrong (Linkin Park, Dead Sara)
- Tim Armstrong (Rancid)
- Paul "Bonehead" Arthurs (Oasis)

== B ==
- Matt Bachand (Shadows Fall)
- Brian Baker (Minor Threat, Dag Nasty, Bad Religion)
- Terry Balsamo (Cold, Evanescence)
- Carl Barât (The Libertines)
- George Barnes (Swing era)
- Bobby Bandiera (Bon Jovi)
- Syd Barrett (Pink Floyd)
- Zoltan Bathory (Five Finger Death Punch)
- Brian Bell (Weezer, Space Twins, The Relationship)
- Chuck Berry
- Brian Benoit (Dillinger Escape Plan)
- Frank Black (The Pixies)
- Jack Black (Tenacious D)
- Norman Blake (Bluegrass)
- Norman Blake (BMX Bandits, Teenage Fanclub)
- Rico Blanco (Rivermaya)
- Bono (U2)
- Avi Bortnick (John Scofield)
- James Bourne (Son of Dork, Busted)
- David Bowie
- Niall Breslin (The Blizzards)
- Joakim Brodén (Sabaton)
- Chris Broderick (In Flames, Megadeth, Jag Panzer)
- Michael Bruce (Alice Cooper)
- Ely Buendia (The Eraserheads, Pupil)
- Beau Burchell (Saosin)
- Benjamin Burnley (Breaking Benjamin)
- David Byrne (Talking Heads)

== C ==
- Carlo Cadona (Dead Kennedys)
- Joey Cape (Me First and the Gimme Gimmes)
- Eric Carmen (The Raspberries)
- Bob Casale (Devo)
- Johnny Cash
- Nick Catanese (Black Label Society)
- Max Cavalera (Sepultura, Soulfly, Cavalera Conspiracy)
- Vincent Cavanagh (Anathema)
- Dino Cazares (Fear Factory, Brujeria, Divine Heresy)
- Nic Cester (Jet)
- Gab Chee Kee (Parokya ni Edgar)
- Don Clark (Demon Hunter)
- Steve Clark (Def Leppard)
- Gilby Clarke (Guns N' Roses, Rock Star Supernova)
- Allen Collins (Lynyrd Skynyrd)
- Catfish Collins (Parliament, Funkadelic, James Brown)
- Eddie Condon
- Dennis Coffey (Temptations, Rare Earth)
- John Connolly (Sevendust)
- John Corabi (Mötley Crüe)
- Billy Corgan (The Smashing Pumpkins)
- Chris Cornell (Audioslave, Soundgarden, Temple of the Dog)
- Gene Cornish (The Rascals, The Young Rascals)
- Mick Cripps (L.A. Guns)
- Jason Cropper (Weezer)
- Steve Cropper (Booker T. & the M.G.'s)
- David Crosby (The Byrds)
- Robbin Crosby (Ratt)
- Phil Cunningham (New Order, Marion, Bad Lieutenant)

== D ==
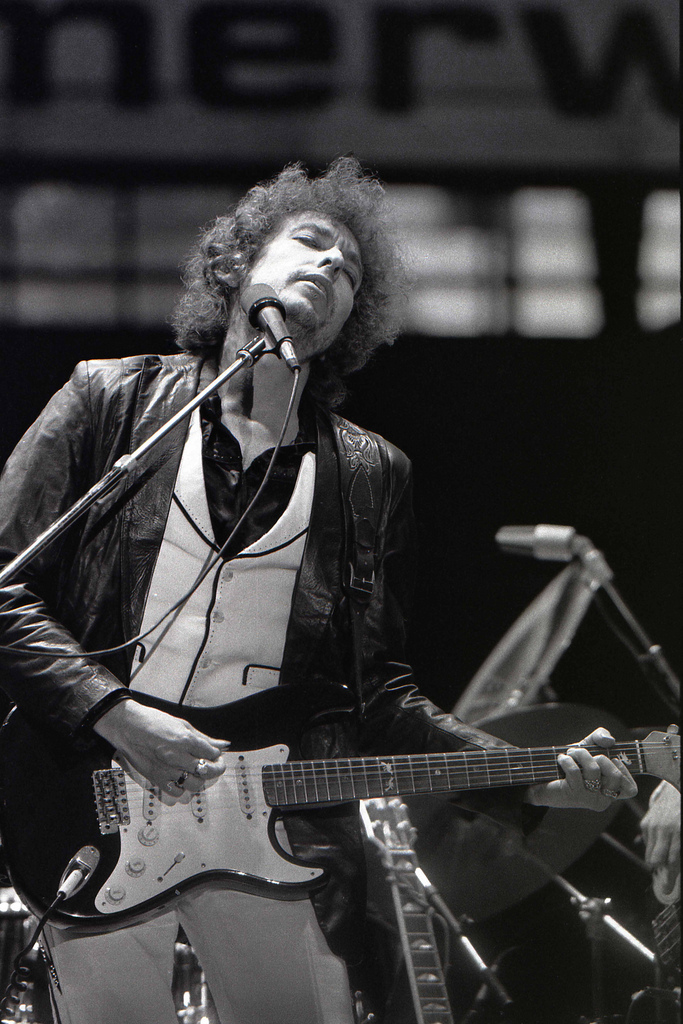
Bob Dylan

- Roger Daltrey (The Who)
- Ray Davies (The Kinks)
- Tom DeLonge (Blink-182, Box Car Racer, Angels & Airwaves)
- Brad Delp (Boston)
- Rick Derringer (The McCoys, Edgar Winter)
- Matt DeVries (Chimaira)
- Neil Diamond
- Dez Dickerson (Prince)
- Mamadou Diop (MAMADOU)
- Pete Doherty (The Libertines)
- Edsel Dope (Dope)
- K. K. Downing (Judas Priest)
- Chris Dreja (The Yardbirds)
- Oscar Dronjak (HammerFall)
- Gary Duncan (Quicksilver Messenger Service)
- Jeff Duncan (Armored Saint)
- Joe Duplantier (Gojira)
- William DuVall (Alice in Chains)
- Bob Dylan

== E ==
- Richey Edwards (Manic Street Preachers)
- Richie Edwards (Stone Gods)
- Danny Elfman (Oingo Boingo)
- Sam Endicott (The Bravery)
- Niclas Engelin (In Flames)
- Everlast
- Roky Erickson (The 13th Floor Elevators)
- Sully Erna (Godsmack)
- Omar Espinosa (Escape the Fate)
- Don Everly
- Jason Everman (Nirvana)

== F ==
- Andy Fairweather Low (Amen Corner, Eric Clapton, Roger Waters, The Who, Joe Satriani)
- Andrew Farriss (INXS)
- John Feldmann (Goldfinger)
- Warren Fitzgerald (Oingo Boingo)
- Tom Fletcher (McFly)
- Robb Flynn (Machine Head)
- Tom Fogerty (Creedence Clearwater Revival)
- Miya Folick
- Dave Fortman (Ugly Kid Joe)
- Richard Fortus (Guns N' Roses)
- Oz Fox (Stryper)
- Lars Frederiksen (Rancid)
- Jay Jay French (Twisted Sister)
- Eric Friedman (Creed)
- Marcelo Fromer (Titãs)
- Glenn Frey (The Eagles)
- Richie Furay (Buffalo Springfield, Poco)

== G ==
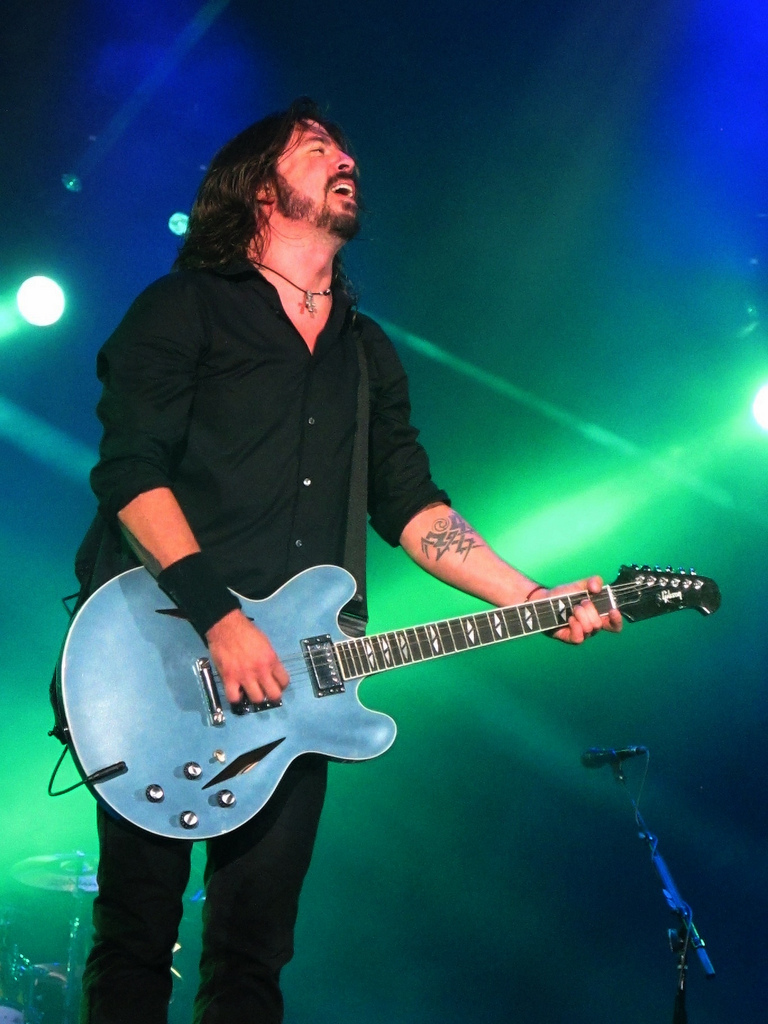
Dave Grohl of Foo Fighters

- Eric Gale (Stuff)
- Anthony Gallo (Suicidal Tendencies)
- Craig Gannon (Aztec Camera, The Bluebells, The Smiths)
- Janet Gardner (Vixen)
- Danny Gatton
- Per Gessle (Roxette)
- Sascha Gerstner (Helloween)
- Barry Gibb (The Bee Gees)
- Maurice Gibb (The Bee Gees)
- Ben Gibbard (Death Cab for Cutie)
- Lynval Golding (The Specials, Fun Boy Three)
- Adam Gontier (Three Days Grace, Saint Asonia)
- Matthew Good (Matthew Good Band)
- Stone Gossard (Pearl Jam)
- Roland Grapow (Helloween)
- Dallas Green (Alexisonfire)
- Freddie Green (Count Basie Orchestra)
- Brian Greenway (April Wine, Mashmakhan)
- Dave Grohl (Foo Fighters)
- Fred Guy

== H ==
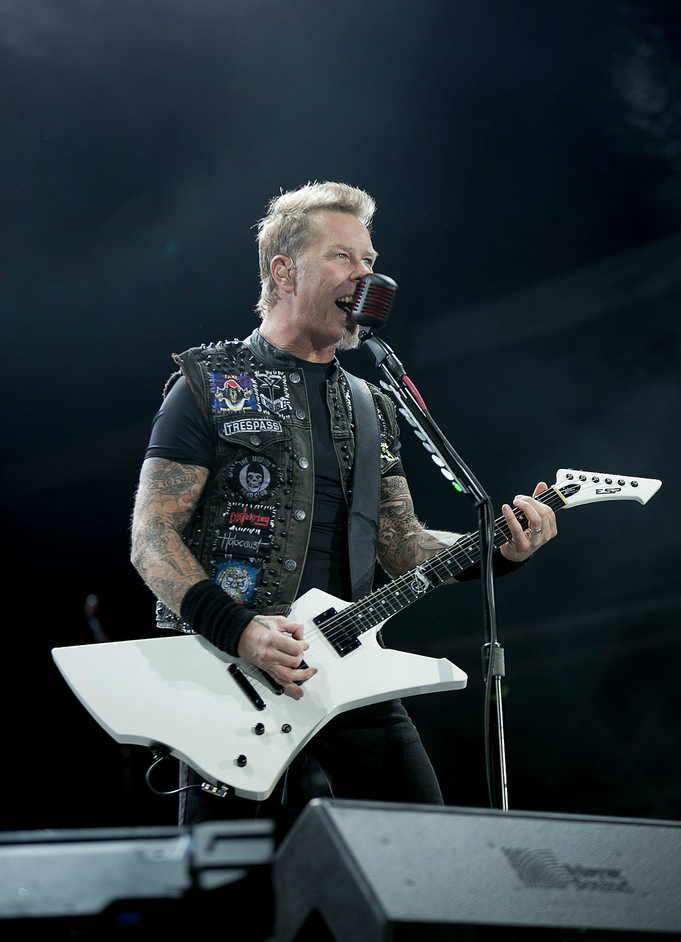
James Hetfield of Metallica

- Mårten Hagström (Meshuggah)
- Lzzy Hale (Halestorm)
- Bill Haley (Bill Haley & His Comets)
- Jim Hall
- John Hall (Orleans, Bonnie Raitt)
- Albert Hammond Jr. (The Strokes)
- Jeff Hanneman (Slayer)
- Glen Hansard (The Frames)
- Kai Hansen (Gamma Ray, Helloween)
- Richie Havens
- Dan Hawkins (The Darkness)
- Matt Heafy (Trivium)
- Charles Hedger (Cradle of Filth)
- Kasperi Heikkinen (Beast in Black)
- Martin Henriksson (Dark Tranquillity)
- James Hetfield (Metallica)
- Nick Hexum (311)
- Susanna Hoffs (The Bangles)
- Noddy Holder (Slade)
- Dexter Holland (The Offspring)
- Buddy Holly (The Crickets)
- John Lee Hooker
- Hyde (L'Arc-en-Ciel)
- Chrissie Hynde (The Pretenders)

== I ==
- Scott Ian (Anthrax)
- John Idan (The Yardbirds)
- James Iha (The Smashing Pumpkins)
- Frank Iero (My Chemical Romance)
- Inoran (Luna Sea)
- Izzy Stradlin (Guns N' Roses)

== J ==
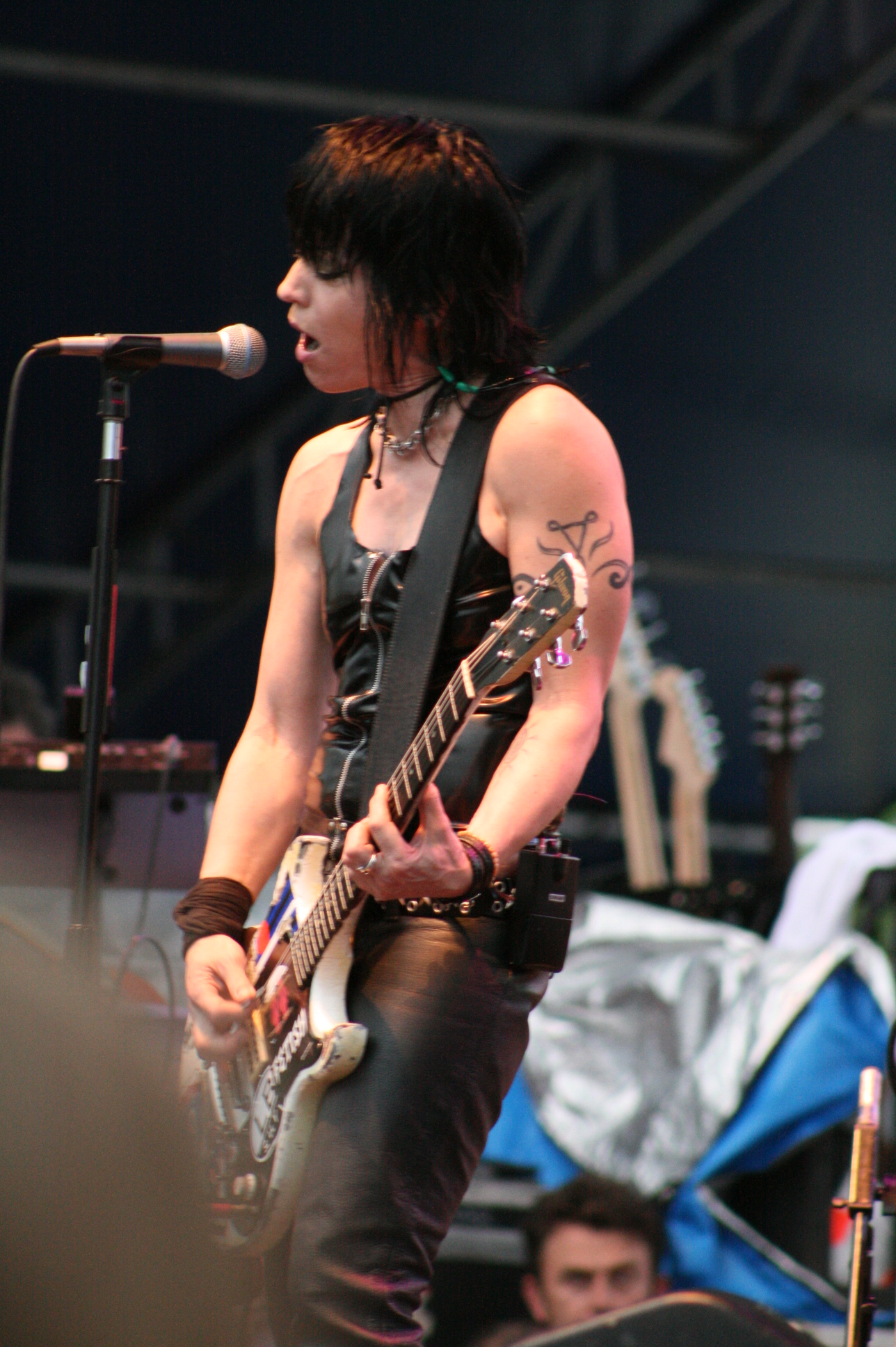
Joan Jett

- Jaret Reddick (Bowling For Soup)
- Jim James (My Morning Jacket)
- Mark Jansen (Epica)
- Russell Javors (Billy Joel Band)
- Al Jardine (The Beach Boys)
- Patrik Jensen (The Haunted)
- Joan Jett (Joan Jett and The Blackhearts, The Runaways)
- Wilko Johnson (Dr. Feelgood, The Blockheads)
- Christofer Johnsson (Therion)
- Tom Johnston (Doobie Brothers)
- Nick Jonas (Jonas Brothers)
- Brian Jones (Rolling Stones)
- Al Jourgensen (Ministry)
- Jung Yong-hwa (CN Blue)
- Jinxx (Black Veil Brides)
- Juanes

== K ==
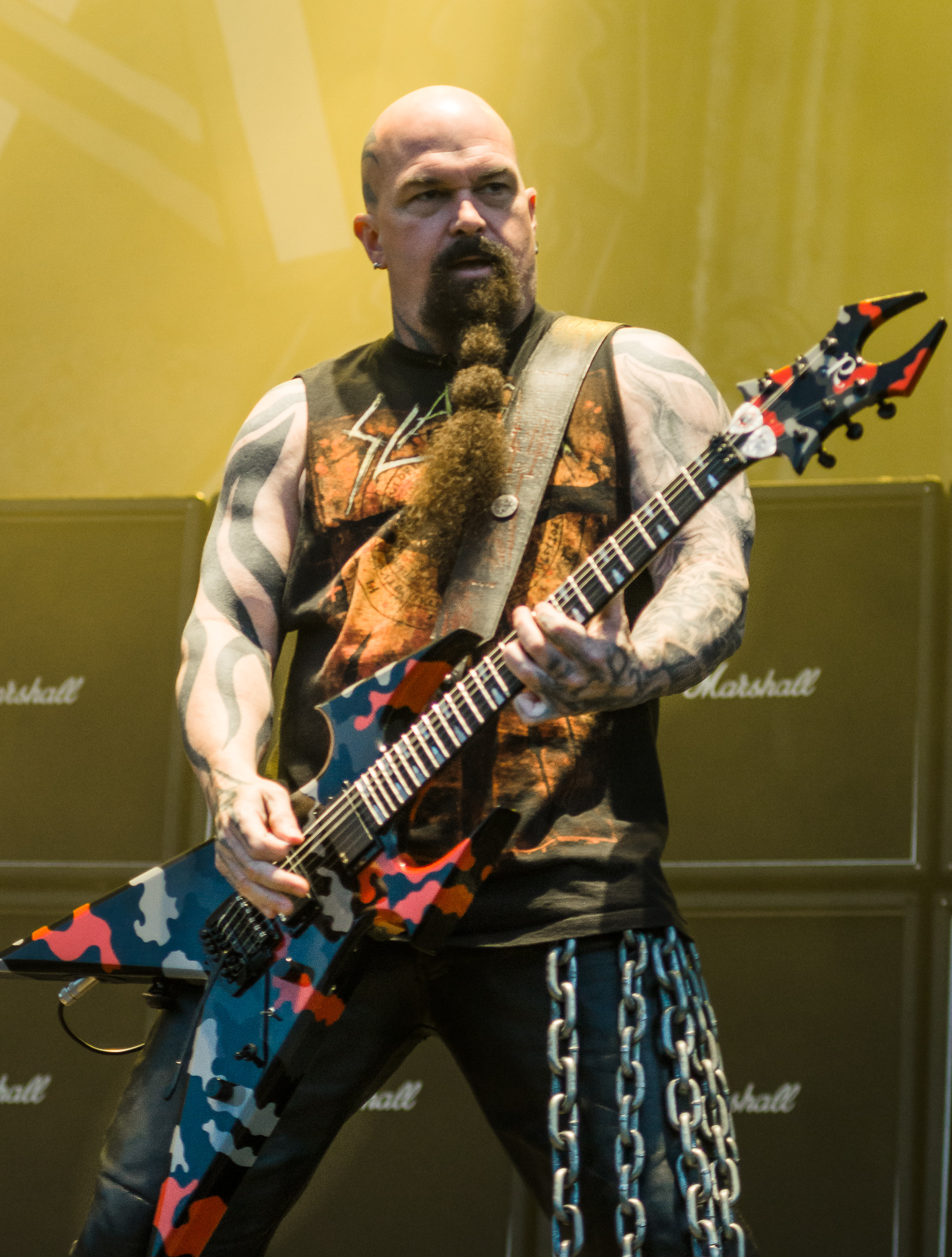
Kerry King, Slayer

- Paul Kantner (Jefferson Airplane, Hot Tuna)
- Steve Katz (Blood, Sweat, and Tears)
- Alex Kapranos (Franz Ferdinand)
- Bob Katsionis (Firewind)
- John Kay (Steppenwolf)
- Gab Chee Kee (Parokya ni Edgar)
- Pepper Keenan (Corrosion of Conformity)
- Bill Kelliher (Mastodon)
- Mike Keneally (Dethklok)
- Myles Kennedy (Alter Bridge)
- Ryan Key (Yellowcard)
- Joe King (The Fray)
- Kerry King (Slayer)
- Jonas Kjellgren (Scar Symmetry)
- Scott Klopfenstein (Reel Big Fish)
- David Knopfler (Dire Straits)
- Carl Kress
- Robby Krieger (The Doors)
- Chad Kroeger (Nickelback)
- Steffen Kummerer (Obscura)
- Dave Kushner (Velvet Revolver)

== L ==
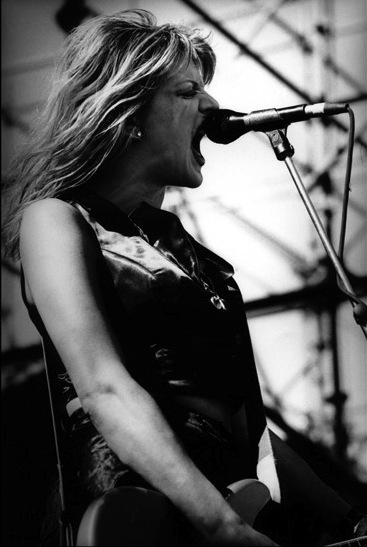
Courtney Love of Hole.

- Michael Landau (Boz Scaggs, Joni Mitchell, James Taylor, Miles Davis)
- Paul Landers (Rammstein)
- Andy LaRocque (King Diamond)
- Tito Larriva (Cruzados, Tito & Tarantula)
- Martin Larsson (At the Gates)
- Roope Latvala (Children of Bodom)
- Avril Lavigne
- Blackie Lawless (W.A.S.P.)
- Larry Lee (Gypsy Sun and Rainbows, Al Green)
- Sébastien Lefebvre (Simple Plan)
- John Lennon (The Beatles)
- Jared Leto (Thirty Seconds to Mars)
- Adam Levine (Maroon 5)
- Aaron Lewis (Staind)
- Mike Lewis (Lostprophets)
- Herman Li (DragonForce)
- Hal Lindes (Dire Straits)
- Glenn Ljungström (Dimension Zero)
- Kenny Loggins (Loggins and Messina, solo artist)
- John Lombardo (10,000 Maniacs)
- Courtney Love (Hole)
- Parker Lundgren (Queensrÿche)
- Simaro Lutumba (Tout Puissant Orchestre Kinshasa Jazz)

== M ==
- Felipe Machado (Viper)
- Bryan MacLean (Love)
- Ian MacKaye (Fugazi)
- Benji Madden (Good Charlotte)
- Joel Madden (Good Charlotte)
- Madonna
- Jen Majura (Evanescence)
- Marilyn Manson (Marilyn Manson)
- Bob Marley
- Steve Marriott (Humble Pie)
- Chris Martin (Coldplay)
- Dave Mason (Traffic)
- Dave Matthews (Dave Matthews Band)
- Justin Mauriello (I Hate Kate, Zebrahead)
- Lee Mavers (The La's)
- Curtis Mayfield (The Impressions)
- Kim McAuliffe (Girlschool)
- Paul McCartney (The Beatles)
- George McCorkle (The Marshall Tucker Band)
- Hugh McCracken
- Country Joe McDonald (Country Joe & The Fish)
- Brownie McGhee
- Tim McIlrath (Rise Against)
- Duff McKagan (Loaded)
- Al McKay (Earth, Wind & Fire)
- Sarah McLachlan
- Eric Melvin (NOFX)
- Wendy Melvoin (Wendy & Lisa, Prince and The Revolution)
- Joe Messina (The Funk Brothers)
- Bret Michaels (Poison)
- Paulo Miklos (Titãs)
- Shaun Morgan (Seether)
- Sterling Morrison (Velvet Underground)
- Cameron Muncey (Jet)
- Dave Mustaine (Megadeth)
- Taylor Momsen (The Pretty Reckless)

== N ==
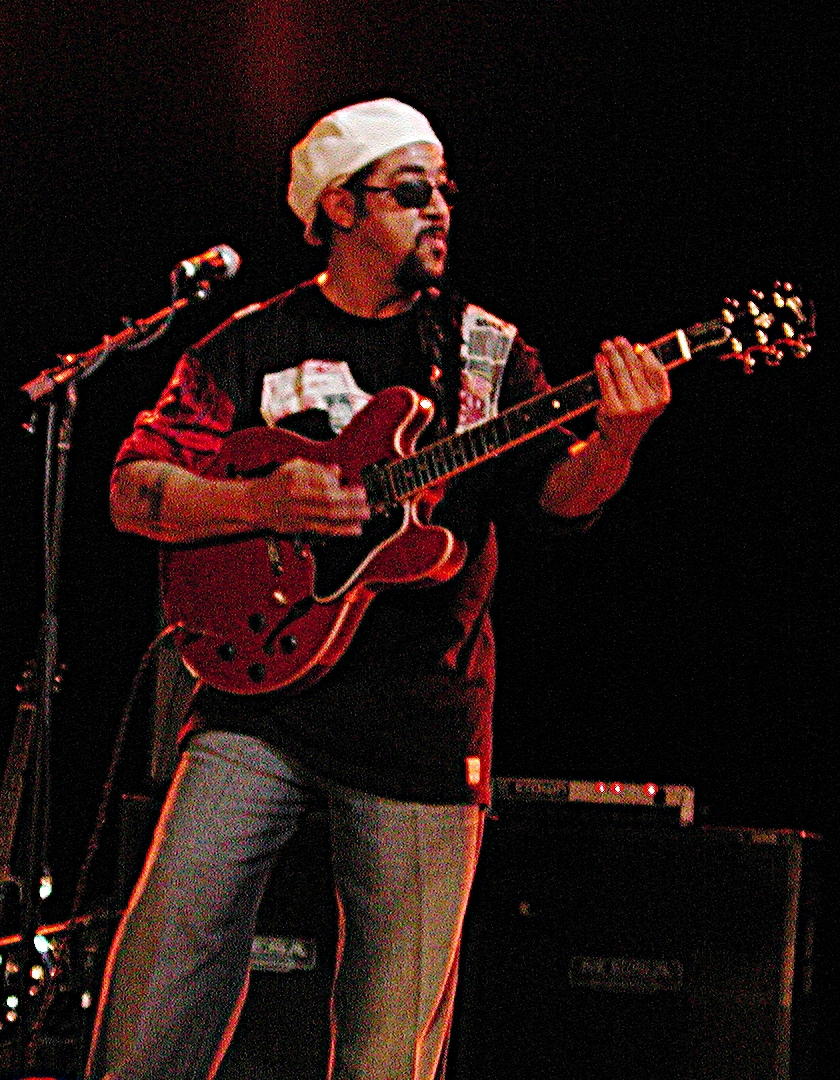
Leo Nocentelli of The Meters

- Graham Nash (The Hollies, Crosby, Stills, Nash & Young)
- A. C. Newman (The New Pornographers)
- Simon Nicol (Fairport Convention)
- Leo Nocentelli (The Meters)
- Jimmy Nolen (The J.B.'s)
- Fredrik Nordström (Dream Evil)

== O ==
- Ed O'Brien (Radiohead)
- John Oates (Hall & Oates)
- Ric Ocasek (The Cars)
- Kele Okereke (Bloc Party)
- Roy Orbison
- Jack Owen (Cannibal Corpse, Deicide, Six Feet Under)

== P ==
- Dave Padden (Annihilator)
- Jimmy Page (The Yardbirds)
- Marek "Spider" Pająk (Vader)
- Rick Parfitt (Status Quo)
- Ralph Patt
- Pata (X Japan)
- Kirk Pengilly (INXS)
- Trevor Peres (Obituary)
- Carl Perkins
- Peter Perrett (The Only Ones)
- Steve Perry (Cherry Poppin' Daddies)
- Mille Petrozza (Kreator)
- Tom Petty (Tom Petty & The Heartbreakers)
- Dave Peverett (Foghat)
- Piggy D. (Marilyn Manson, Rob Zombie)
- John Pisano (Tijuana Brass, Sérgio Mendes)
- Monte Pittman (Madonna, Ministry, Prong)
- Bucky Pizzarelli
- Chris Poland (Megadeth)
- Elvis Presley
- Prince
- Jett Pangan (The Dawn)

== R ==
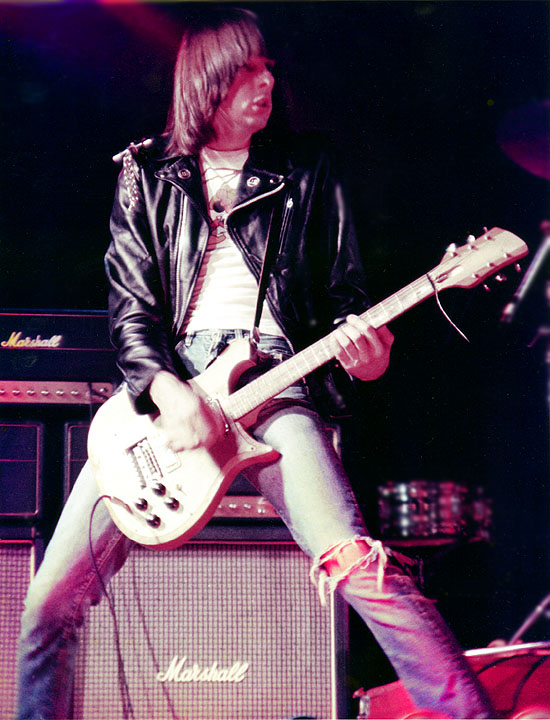
Johnny Ramone of The Ramones

- David Ragsdale (Kansas)
- Johnny Ramone (The Ramones)
- Josh Ramsay (Marianas Trench)
- Jaret Reddick (Bowling for Soup)
- Jimmy Reed
- Lou Reed (The Velvet Underground)
- Kurt Reifler
- Tim Reynolds
- John Rich (Big & Rich)
- Keith Richards (The Rolling Stones)
- Brian Robertson (Thin Lizzy)
- Ed Robertson (Barenaked Ladies)
- Johnny Rod (W.A.S.P.)
- Nile Rodgers (Chic)
- Dean Roland (Collective Soul)
- Gavin Rossdale (Bush, Institute)
- Gary Rossington (Lynyrd Skynyrd)
- Darius Rucker (Hootie & the Blowfish)
- Mike Rutherford (Genesis)
- Paul Ryan (Cradle of Filth)

== S ==
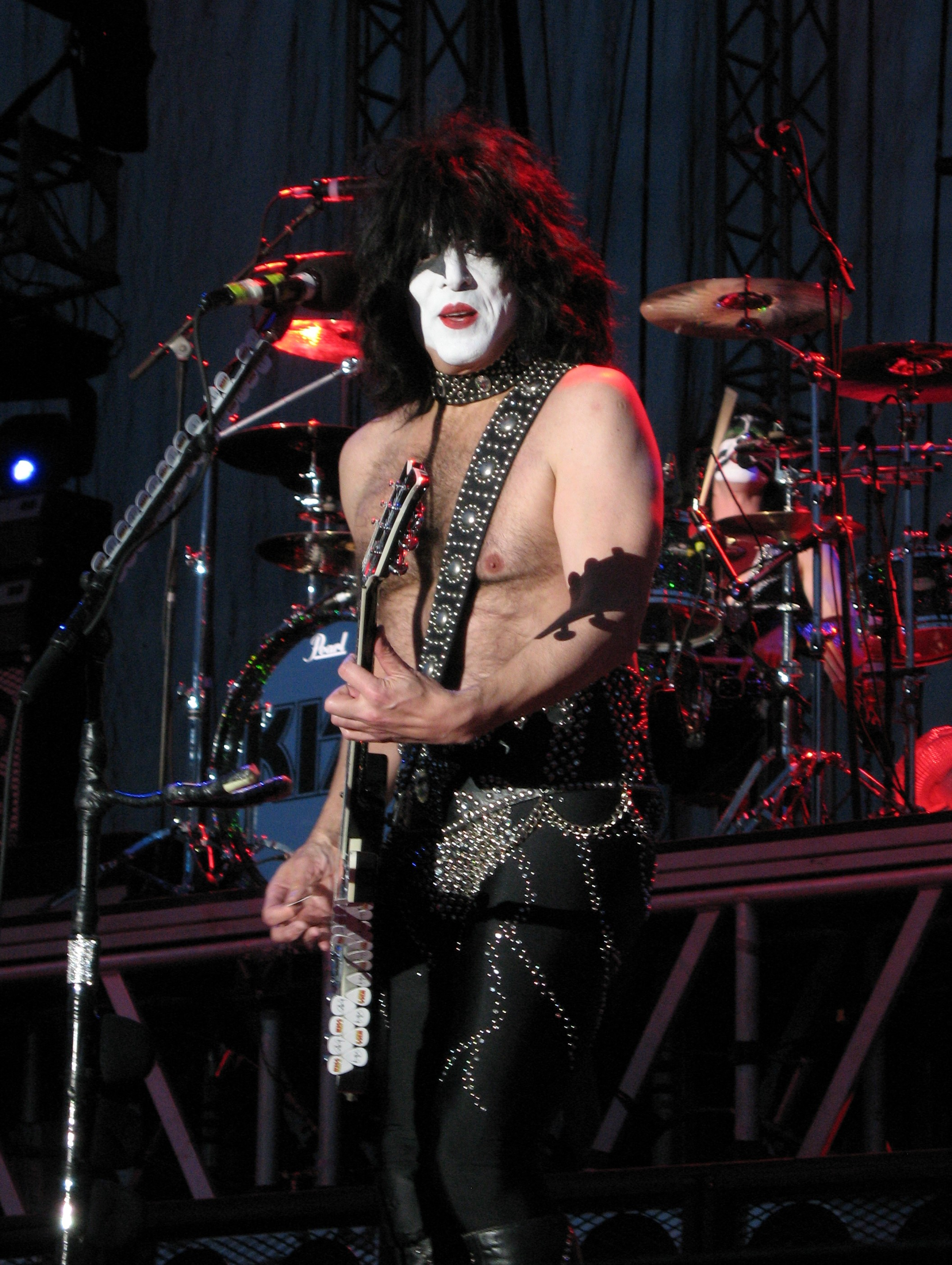
Paul Stanley of Kiss

- Claudio Sanchez (Coheed and Cambria)
- Jon Schaffer (Iced Earth)
- Rudolf Schenker (Scorpions)
- Patti Scialfa (Bruce Springsteen and the E Street Band)
- John Sebastian (The Lovin' Spoonful)
- Boz Scaggs
- James Shaffer (Korn)
- Shagrath (Chrome Division)
- John Shanks (Bon Jovi)
- Garry Shider (Parliament-Funkadelic)
- Mike Shinoda (Linkin Park)
- Marcus Siepen (Blind Guardian)
- Charlie Simpson (Fightstar)
- Fred "Sonic" Smith (MC5)
- Silenoz (Dimmu Borgir)
- Acey Slade (Misfits, Dope, Trashlight Vision)
- Mark Slaughter (Slaughter)
- Brendon Small (Dethklok)
- Pat Smear (Germs, Nirvana, Foo Fighters)
- Robert Smith (The Cure)
- Tom Smith (Editors)
- Skip Spence (Moby Grape)
- Tony Spinner (Toto)
- David Spinozza
- Derek St. Holmes (Ted Nugent, Whitford/St. Holmes)
- Layne Staley (Alice in Chains, Mad Season)
- Paul Stanley (Kiss)
- Mikael Stanne (Dark Tranquillity)
- Wayne Static (Static-X)
- Cat Stevens (Yusuf Islam)
- Mike Stone (Queensrÿche)
- Izzy Stradlin (Guns N' Roses)
- Jesper Strömblad (In Flames, Dimension Zero, Cyhra)
- Joe Strummer (The Clash)
- Patrick Stump (Fall Out Boy)
- Nasty Suicide (Hanoi Rocks)
- Andy Summers (The Police)
- Dan Swanö (Bloodbath)
- Michael Sweet (Stryper)
- Sylvain Sylvain (New York Dolls)
- Patryk Dominik Sztyber (Behemoth)

== T ==
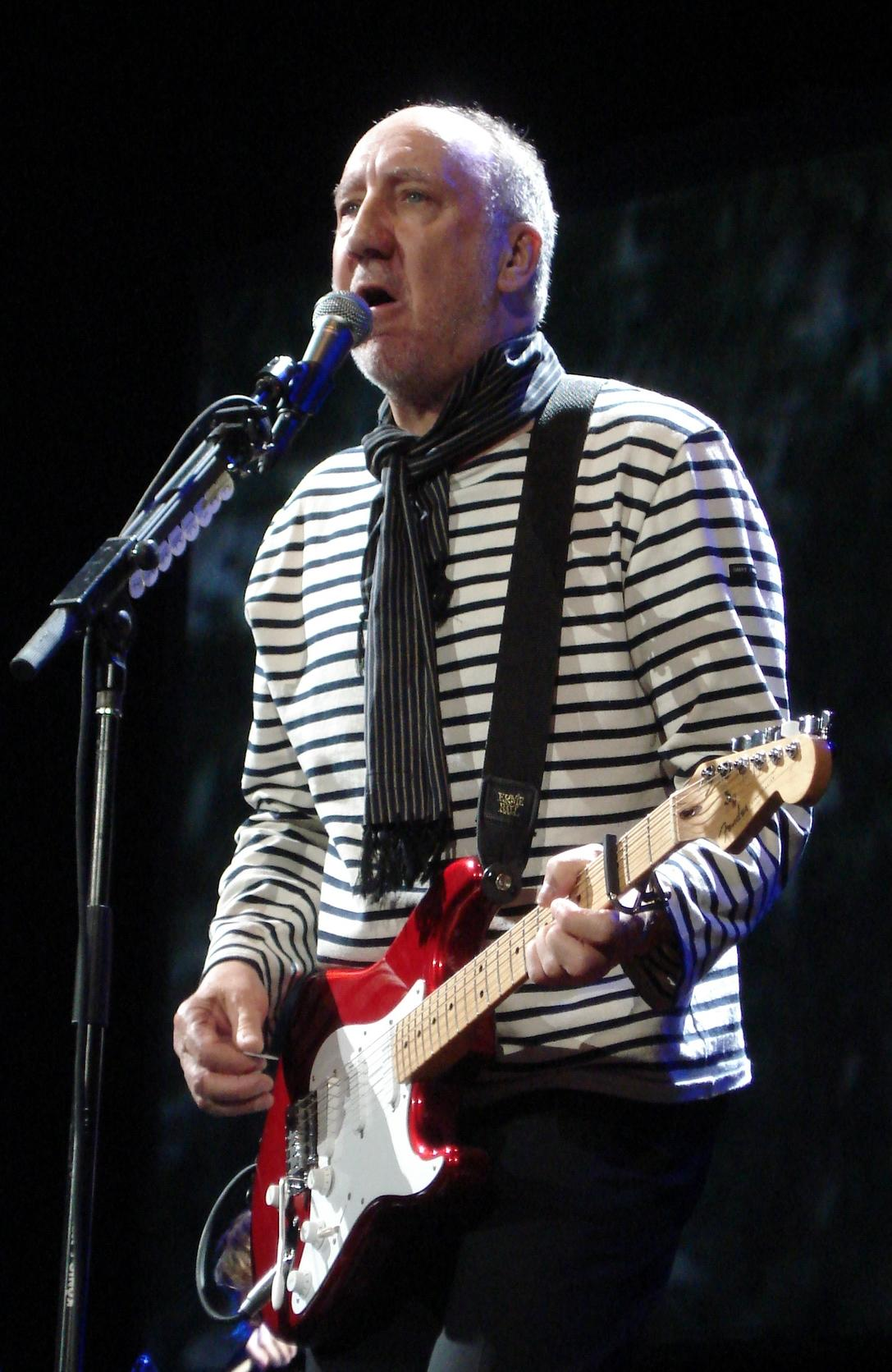
Pete Townshend of The Who

- Ray Tabano (Aerosmith)
- Takuro (Glay)
- Serj Tankian (System of a Down)
- Evan Taubenfeld
- Corey Taylor (Slipknot, Stone Sour)
- Tommy Tedesco
- Bobby Tench
- Landon Tewers (The Plot in You)
- Teru (Versailles, Jupiter)
- Roger Taylor (The Cross, Queen)
- Tom Thacker (Gob)
- Scott Thurston (Tom Petty and the Heartbreakers)
- Paul Tobias (Guns N' Roses)
- Simon Tong (The Verve, The Shining, The Good, the Bad & the Queen)
- Sam Totman (DragonForce)
- Pete Townshend (The Who)
- Joe Trohman (Fall Out Boy)
- Matthew Tuck (Bullet for My Valentine)
- Corin Tucker (Sleater-Kinney)
- Alex Turner (Arctic Monkeys)
- Jeff Tuttle (Dillinger Escape Plan)

== V ==
- Kathy Valentine (The Go-Go's)
- Kurdt Vanderhoof (Metal Church)
- Anneke van Giersbergen (Anneke van Giersbergen)
- Steven Van Zandt (E Street Band)
- Jimmie Vaughan (The Fabulous Thunderbirds)
- Eddie Vedder (Pearl Jam)

== W ==
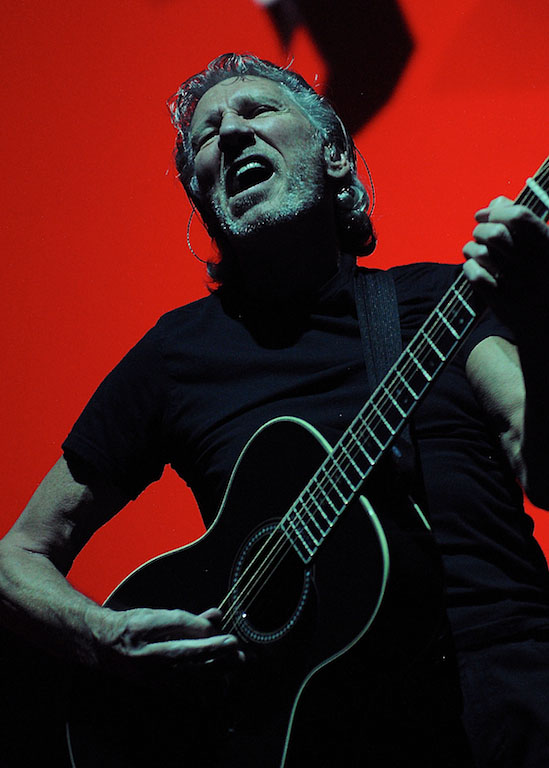
Roger Waters of Pink Floyd

- Joe Walsh (James Gang, Eagles)
- Roger Waters (Pink Floyd)
- Bob Weir (Grateful Dead)
- Brian Welch (Korn)
- Bob Welch (Fleetwood Mac)
- Bruce Welch (The Shadows)
- Emil Werstler (Chimaira, Dååth)
- Robert Westerholt (Within Temptation)
- Deryck Whibley (Sum 41)
- Robert White (The Funk Brothers)
- Brad Whitford (Aerosmith)
- Danny Whitten (Crazy Horse)
- Jane Wiedlin (The Go-Go's)
- Rich Williams (Kansas)
- Eddie Willis (The Funk Brothers)
- Nancy Wilson (Heart)
- Ricky Wilson (The B-52's)
- Kirk Windstein (Crowbar)
- Christian Olde Wolbers (Fear Factory, Arkaea)
- Ronnie Wood (Faces, The Rolling Stones)

== Y ==
- Jim Yester (The Association)
- Taylor York (Paramore)
- Thom Yorke (Radiohead, The Smile)
- George Young (The Easybeats)
- Malcolm Young (AC/DC)

== Z ==
- Robin Zander (Cheap Trick)
- John Zwetsloot (Dissection)

== See also ==
- List of classical guitarists
- List of drummers
- List of jazz guitarists
- List of lead guitarists
- List of bass guitarists
- List of slide guitarists
- List of keyboardists
