= The Flames of the End =

Video by At the Gates
- Released: 22 February 2010
- Recorded: Wacken Open Air, Wacken, Schleswig-Holstein, 2 August 2008 (main show), Various
- Genre: Melodic death metal
- Length: 2:01:35
- Label: Earache Records
- Director: Anders Bjorler
- Producer: Tue Madsen (Wacken concert only)

At the Gates live chronology
Suicidal Final Art (2001)	The Flames of the End (2010)	Purgatory Unleashed – Live at Wacken (2010)

The Flames of the End is the first video album by Swedish melodic death metal band At the Gates. Its main feature is a 2-hour+ documentary detailing the history of the band and their successful reunion tour, directed by guitarist and founding member Anders Bjorler. The set also includes their set from Wacken Open Air 2008 on the second disc, and a collection of songs from various venues, music videos and deleted scenes from the documentary on the third. The set is packaged in a digipak with a 40-page booklet. Earache Records has also made available a limited-edition set including an LP, CD, shirt, belt buckle, keyring, patch and 4 plectrums. Bjorler has described the DVD as "a fine last document for the band".

== Disc one: "Under a Serpent Sun - The Story of At the Gates" ==
1. Introduction & Opening Titles
2. Reunion: From Vision to Reality
3. The Early Years Part 1: From Nursery Rhymes to Death Metal
4. The Early Years Part 2: The Schillerska / Billdal Connection
5. The Early Years Part 3: The Grotesque / At the Gates Transition
6. The Early Years Part 4: Creativity Unbound
7. Gardens of Grief
8. The Red in the Sky Is Ours
9. Reunion: Sweden Rock 2008
10. With Fear I Kiss the Burning Darkness
11. Exit Alf - Enter Martin
12. Reunion: Graspop 2008
13. Terminal Spirit Disease
14. Reunion: Ruis Rock 2008
15. Slaughter of the Soul
16. Reunion: America re-visited
17. Reunion: San Antonio, TX 2008
18. Exit Anders
19. Reunion: Bloodstock Open Air 2008
20. Reunion: The Past Is Alive
21. Beyond the Gates
22. End Credits
23. Interview with Tomas in Chicago 1996 (Deleted Scenes)
24. Adrian, the Prankster (Deleted Scenes)
25. The Tokyo Experience (Deleted Scenes)
26. Elvis Has Left the Building (Deleted Scenes)
27. European Mini-Tour with Therion 1992 (Deleted Scenes)
28. Gods of Metal, Italy 2008 (Deleted Scenes)
29. Tompa cleaning out the trailer (Deleted Scenes)
30. Kingdom Gone (Music Video)
31. The Burning Darkness (Music Video)
32. Terminal Spirit Disease (Music Video)
33. Blinded by Fear (Music Video)

== Disc two: "Purgatory Unleashed - Live at Wacken" ==
1. Intro (backstage)
2. Slaughter of the Soul
3. Cold
4. Terminal Spirit Disease
5. Raped by the Light of Christ
6. Under a Serpent Sun
7. Windows
8. World of Lies
9. The Burning Darkness
10. The Swarm
11. Forever Blind
12. Nausea
13. The Beautiful Wound
14. Unto Others
15. All Life Ends
16. Need
17. Blinded by Fear
18. Suicide Nation
19. Kingdom Gone

== Disc three: "Only the Dead Are Smiling" ==
1. Slaughter of the Soul (Wetlands, New York, US 7 March 1996)
2. Cold (Wetlands, New York, US 7 March 1996)
3. The Swarm (Wetlands, New York, US 7 March 1996)
4. Blinded by Fear (Thirsty Whale, Rivergrove, IL, US, 10 March 1996)
5. Suicide Nation (Thirsty Whale, Rivergrove, IL, US, 10 March 1996)
6. Under a Serpent Sun (Thirsty Whale, Rivergrove, IL, US, 10 March 1996)
7. Suicide Nation (Ruisrock, Turku, Finland, 4 July 2008)
8. Raped by the Light of Christ (Ruisrock, Turku, Finland, 4 July 2008)
9. Windows (Ruisrock, Turku, Finland, 4 July 2008)
10. World of Lies (Ruisrock, Turku, Finland, 4 July 2008)
11. Nausea (Ruisrock, Turku, Finland, 4 July 2008)
12. Slaughter of the Soul (Graspop Metal Meeting, Dessel, Belgium, 29 June 2008)
13. Cold (Graspop Metal Meeting, Dessel, Belgium, 29 June 2008)
14. Terminal Spirit Disease (Graspop Metal Meeting, Dessel, Belgium, 29 June 2008)
15. The Beautiful Wound (Graspop Metal Meeting, Dessel, Belgium, 29 June 2008)
16. The Burning Darkness (Witchwood, Manchester UK, 5 February 1996)
17. Through Gardens of Grief (Factory, Eskilstuna, Sweden, 20 April 1991)
18. All Life Ends (Factory, Eskilstuna, Sweden, 20 April 1991)
19. City of Screaming Statues (Factory, Eskilstuna, Sweden, 20 April 1991)
20. Slaughter of the Soul (Studio Coast, Tokyo, Japan, 11 May 2008)
21. Cold (Studio Coast, Tokyo, Japan, 11 May 2008)
22. Under a Serpent Sun (Studio Coast, Tokyo, Japan, 11 May 2008)
23. Slaughter of the Soul (Irving Plaza, New York, US, 9 July 2008)
24. Need (The Abyss, Houston, TX, US, 17 March 1996)
25. Neverwhere (Gagarin 205, Athens, Greece, 21 September 2008)
26. Kingdom Gone (Gagarin 205, Athens, Greece, 21 September 2008)

== Personnel ==
=== Reunion tour line-up ===
- Tomas Lindberg − vocals
- Anders Björler − guitar
- Martin Larsson – guitar
- Jonas Björler − bass
- Adrian Erlandsson − drums

=== Former members (archive footage) ===
- Alf Svensson − guitar (1990–1993)
- Tony Andersson − bass (1992)
- "Purgatory Unleashed" produced by Tue Madsen
