= Alf Svensson =

Alf Svensson may refer to:

- Alf Svensson (politician)
- Alf Svensson (guitarist)
