= The Nightmare of Being =

Studio album by At the Gates
- Released: 2 June 2021
- Studio: Welfare Sounds & Studio, Gothenburg; Studio Gröndal, Stockholm; Sonic Train Studio, Varberg; Fascination Street Studios, Örebro
- Genre: Melodic death metal
- Length: 45:37
- Label: Century Media
- Producer: At the Gates; Jens Bogren

At the Gates chronology
To Drink from the Night Itself (2018)	The Nightmare of Being (2021)	The Ghost of a Future Dead (2026)

The Nightmare of Being is the seventh studio album by Swedish melodic death metal band At the Gates, released on 2 June 2021 by Century Media. It continues the band’s second era following their 2007 reunion. While the album remains rooted in the Gothenburg metal tradition, it incorporates a wider range of musical styles and influences, with lyrical ideas influenced by the writings of horror philosophers such as Thomas Ligotti and Eugene Thacker. The Nightmare of Being is the band's final album to feature guitarist Jonas Stålhammar, and also the last album released in Lindberg’s lifetime before his death in 2025.

== Background ==
Work on The Nightmare of Being began during the final stages of At the Gates' previous album, To Drink from the Night Itself and continued in 2020 with the global COVID-19 pandemic providing additional time for reflection and refinement of the songs.

The Nightmare of Being was completed in multiple Swedish studios, with drums tracked at Studio Gröndal with Jens Bogren, guitars and bass recorded with Andy La Rocque at Sonic Train Studio, and vocals at Welfare Sounds with Per Stålberg. The album was mixed and mastered by Jens Bogren at Fascination Street Studios; he had previously worked with the band for their At War with Reality album in 2014. The visual concept for the album cover was developed by artist Eva Nahon. The overall theme addresses philosophical pessimism, according to vocalist Tomas Lindberg.

== Reception ==
Professional ratings
Aggregate scores
Source	Rating
Metacritic	77/100
Review scores
Source	Rating
AllMusic	4/5 stars
Classic Rock	8/10
Consequence	B+
Kerrang!	3/5
Pitchfork	7.5/10
The Wire	70/100

The Nightmare of Being received generally favourable reviews from music critics. On the review aggregator website Metacritic, the album holds a score of 77 out of 100 based on seven professional reviews, indicating a "generally favorable" reception. Critics praised the band's willingness to expand their sound while retaining core melodic death metal elements.

Consequence and AllMusic noted the albums' inventive qualities, experimentation and strong musicianship. Pitchfork highlighted its powerful core ethos. The Wire noted the album's somewhat-wide genre of musical composition. Sputnikmusic noted that while the album is not a masterpiece, it is solid and listen-worthy. Kerrang! mentioned that while the experimentation is somewhat negatively brought this late in the band's history, the album is a fascinating addition to their collection.

== Track listing ==
All lyrics are written by T. Lindberg; all music is composed by J. Björler, except where noted.

No.	Title	Music	Length
1.	"Spectre of Extinction"	Jonas Björler & Andy La Roque	4:49
2.	"The Paradox"	Jonas Björler & Jonas Stålhammar	4:43
3.	"The Nightmare of Being"		3:49
4.	"Garden of Cyrus"		4:25
5.	"Touched by the White Hands of Death"		4:07
6.	"The Fall into Time"		6:45
7.	"Cult of Salvation"		4:25
8.	"The Abstract Enthroned"		4:26
9.	"Cosmic Pessimism"		4:31
10.	"Eternal Winter of Reason"		3:38
Total length:			45:37

=== Deluxe boxset edition ===
The deluxe boxset edition included live tracks, and a bonus CD with the album as instrumental.

Live tracks
No.	Title	Length
1.	"Red (King Crimson-cover)" (Live At Roadburn)	3:22
2.	"The Scar" (Live At Roadburn)	3:08
3.	"Koyaanisqatsi" (Live At Roadburn)	3:37
4.	"Daggers Of Black Haze" (Live In Stockholm)	4:48
5.	"Death And The Labyrinth" (Live In San Francisco)	3:37
6.	"A Stare Bound In Stone" (Live In San Francisco)	4:09
7.	"Heroes And Tombs" (Live In San Francisco)	4:04
8.	"The Night Eternal" (Live In San Francisco)	6:21
Total length:		35:35

== Personnel ==
=== At the Gates ===
- Tomas Lindberg Redant – vocals
- Martin Larsson – guitars
- Jonas Stålhammar – guitars, backing vocals
- Jonas Björler – bass, keyboards, backing vocals
- Adrian Erlandsson – drums

(Source)

=== Artwork and design ===
- Eva Nahon – album cover and visual concept

== Charts ==
Chart	Peak position
Austrian Albums (Ö3 Austria)	18
Belgian Albums (Ultratop Flanders)	84
Belgian Albums (Ultratop Wallonia)	115
Dutch Albums (Album Top 100)	77
Finnish Albums (Suomen virallinen lista)	21
German Albums (Offizielle Top 100)	2
Swedish Albums (Sverigetopplistan)	20
Swiss Albums (Schweizer Hitparade)	12
UK Rock & Metal Albums (OCC)	3
US Top Album Sales (Billboard)	28
US Top Current Album Sales (Billboard)	14

The Nightmare of Being also reached:

- #5 on physical sales at the Finnish charts.
- #2 on the Hard Rock category at the Swedish charts.
- #1 on physical sales at the Swedish charts.
- #1 on physical vinyl sales at the Swedish charts.
- #1 in the US at the Current Hard Music Albums.
- #4 in the US at the Current Rock Albums.
