= Suicidal Final Art =

Compilation album by At the Gates
- Released: 26 June 2001
- Genre: Melodic death metal
- Length: 58:46
- Label: Peaceville
- Producer: Fredrik Nordström

At the Gates chronology
Cursed to Tour (1995)	Suicidal Final Art (2001)	The Flames of the End (2010)

Professional ratings
Review scores
Source	Rating
Allmusic	4/5 stars

Suicidal Final Art is the first compilation album by Swedish melodic death metal band At the Gates. The name is taken from a line in the title track of the Slaughter of the Soul album.

== Track listing ==
No.	Title	Length
1.	"The Red in the Sky Is Ours"	3:06
2.	"Kingdom Gone"	4:41
3.	"Windows"	3:54
4.	"Ever Opening Flower" (demo version)	5:32
5.	"The Architects" (demo version)	3:29
6.	"Raped by the Light of Christ"	2:54
7.	"Primal Breath"	7:17
8.	"Blood of the Sunsets"	4:26
9.	"The Burning Darkness"	2:10
10.	"The Swarm"	3:27
11.	"Terminal Spirit Disease"	3:40
12.	"Forever Blind"	3:58
13.	"The Beautiful Wound"	3:52
14.	"Blinded by Fear"	3:11
15.	"Slaughter of the Soul"	3:03
16.	"Terminal Spirit Disease" (enhanced video)	3:40
17.	"The Burning Darkness" (enhanced video)	2:11
Total length:		58:46

== Credits ==
- Anders Björler - guitar
- Jonas Björler - bass
- Adrian Erlandsson - drums
- Alf Svensson - guitars
- Martin Larsson - guitars
- Tomas Lindberg - vocals
