= Åke Hodell =

Swedish fighter pilot, poet, author, text-sound composer and artist

Åke Hodell (April 30, 1919 – July 29, 2000) was a Swedish fighter pilot, poet, author, text-sound composer, and artist.

== Biography ==
Hodell was the son of author Björn Hodell and brother of actor Ulla Hodell; the film director Laila Hodell, born in 1944, was his daughter.

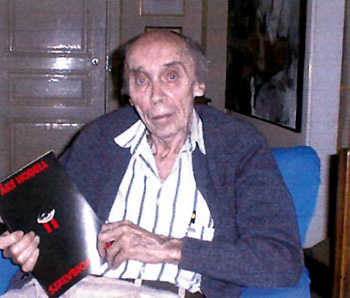
Åke Hodell 2000

Hodell trained as a fighter pilot, but after a crash during practice on July 17, 1941, he had to spend the next few years in hospital. This was a turning point, and he became a dedicated antimilitarist. Lying in hospital, he got to know author Gunnar Ekelöf. Hodell published his first book, Flyende Pilot, in 1953. In his books, Hodell experimented with what he called elektronismer; on stage and in radio in the early 60s, he worked with text-sound composition. During this period he was also active at Pistolteatern in Stockholm. He created the book publisher Kerberos.

One of his visual artworks, the piece "220 Volt Buddha", was used as the album cover of Swedish heavy metal band At the Gates' 1993 album With Fear I Kiss the Burning Darkness.

Hodell died in 2000 in Stockholm.

=== General Busy ===
One of Hodell's most famous works was added in 1963 and was given the title General Busy. The work is a piece of concrete poetry with long repetitions of minimalist variations on words, syllables and sound elements from a few simple sentences, e.g. "General Busy! I want to obey orders!". According to Hodell himself, the agency must express how a young conscripts' resistance to the authorities in the defense is gradually broken down, and how the conscience finally accepts ordering and blind obedience to the commanders. The conscience is represented in the paragraph by the letter "I", which he thought looked as if it were in a deed. The title refers to the fact that in the Swedish defense in the 1950s began to say that the commanders would be "bushy" and the crew's comrade, unlike the former cadaver discipline.

== Discography ==
- Verbal Brainwash and Other Works (2000, Fylkingen)

== See also ==
- Musique concrète
- Sound poetry
