= To Drink from the Night Itself =

Studio album by At the Gates
- Released: 18 May 2018
- Recorded: 12 November − 17 December 2017
- Studio: Various: Parlour Studios (Kettering, England); Welfare Studios (Gothenburg, Sweden); Rovljud Studios (Örebro, Sweden)
- Genre: Melodic death metal
- Length: 44:41
- Label: Century Media
- Producer: Russ Russell

At the Gates chronology
At War with Reality (2014)	To Drink from the Night Itself (2018)	The Nightmare of Being (2021)

Singles from To Drink from the Night Itself
- 1. "To Drink from the Night Itself" Released: 2 March 2018; 2. "A Stare Bound in Stone" Released: 30 March 2018; 3. "Daggers of Black Haze" Released: 27 April 2018; 4. "The Mirror Black (feat. Rob Miller)" Released: 11 January 2019

To Drink from the Night Itself is the sixth studio album by Swedish melodic death metal band At the Gates, released on 18 May 2018 via Century Media. The album is the first to feature guitarist Jonas Stålhammar and the first without co-founding guitarist Anders Björler, who had departed from the band in March 2017.

== Critical reception ==
Professional ratings
Aggregate scores
Source	Rating
Metacritic	78/100
Review scores
Source	Rating
Exclaim!	8/10
Pitchfork	7.3/10
Rolling Stone	3.5/5 stars

Upon its release, To Drink from the Night Itself received generally favorable reviews from critics. At Metacritic, which assigns a normalized rating out of 100 to reviews from mainstream publications, the album received an average score of 78 based on 6 reviews.

=== Accolades ===
Publication	Accolade	Rank	Ref.
Decibel	Decibel's Top 40 Albums of 2018	11	
Revolver	Revolver's Top 30 Albums of 2018	30	

== Track listing ==
All lyrics are written by Tomas Lindberg; all music is composed by Jonas Björler.

No.	Title	Length
1.	"Der Widerstand" (instrumental)	1:28
2.	"To Drink from the Night Itself"	3:23
3.	"A Stare Bound in Stone"	4:08
4.	"Palace of Lepers"	4:05
5.	"Daggers of Black Haze"	4:42
6.	"The Chasm"	3:21
7.	"In Nameless Sleep"	3:37
8.	"The Colours of the Beast"	3:50
9.	"A Labyrinth of Tombs"	3:30
10.	"Seas of Starvation"	3:56
11.	"In Death They Shall Burn"	3:59
12.	"The Mirror Black"	4:42
Total length:		44:41

Limited mediabook edition bonus CD
No.	Title	Length
1.	"Daggers of Black Haze" (feat. Rob Miller)	4:47
2.	"The Chasm" (feat. Per Boder)	3:21
3.	"A Labyrinth of Tombs" (feat. Mikael Nox Pettersson)	3:32
4.	"The Chasm" (demo)	3:21
5.	"The Mirror Black" (feat. Rob Miller)	4:38
Total length:		19:39

Japanese edition bonus CD
No.	Title	Length
1.	"Daggers of Black Haze" (feat. Rob Miller)	4:47
2.	"The Chasm" (feat. Per Boder)	3:21
3.	"A Labyrinth of Tombs" (feat. Mikael Nox Pettersson)	3:32
4.	"Raped by the Light of Christ (2018)" (re-recorded from With Fear I Kiss the Burning Darkness)	2:57
5.	"The Chasm" (demo)	3:21
6.	"The Mirror Black" (feat. Rob Miller)	4:38
Total length:		22:36

== Personnel ==
At the Gates

- Tomas Lindberg – lead vocals
- Martin Larsson – guitars, acoustic guitar
- Jonas Stålhammar – lead guitar, Mellotron, backing vocals
- Jonas Björler – bass, keyboards, acoustic guitar, backing vocals
- Adrian Erlandsson – drums

Additional musicians

- Andy LaRocque – guitar solo (track 7)
- Rob Miller – vocals (tracks 1 and 5 on bonus CD)
- Per Boder – vocals (track 2 on bonus CD)
- Mikael Nox Pettersson – vocals (track 3 on bonus CD)
- Rajmund Follmann – cello
- Peter Nitsche – double bass
- Tony Larsson – violin

Production

- Russ Russell – producer, recording, mixing, mastering
- Tomas Lindberg – producer
- Jonas Björler – producer
- Per Stålberg – recording (vocals)
- Olle Björk – recording (vocals)
- Martin Jacobson – recording (strings)
- Costin Chioreanu – artwork, layout
- Ester Segarra – photography
- Patric Ullaeus – music video (track 2)

== Charts ==
Chart (2018)	Peak position
Austrian Albums (Ö3 Austria)	22
Belgian Albums (Ultratop Flanders)	39
Belgian Albums (Ultratop Wallonia)	132
Finnish Albums (Suomen virallinen lista)	18
German Albums (Offizielle Top 100)	10
Scottish Albums (OCC)	61
Swedish Albums (Sverigetopplistan)	13
Swiss Albums (Schweizer Hitparade)	25
UK Rock & Metal Albums (OCC)	8
US Top Hard Rock Albums (Billboard)	18
