= The Ghost of a Future Dead =

Studio album by At the Gates
- Released: 24 April 2026
- Studio: Fascination Street Studios, Örebro
- Genre: Melodic death metal
- Length: 42:22
- Label: Century Media
- Producer: Jens Bogren

At the Gates chronology
The Nightmare of Being (2021)	The Ghost of a Future Dead (2026)

The Ghost of a Future Dead is the eighth studio album by Swedish melodic death metal band At the Gates. The album was released on 24 April 2026 by Century Media. It is the band's first album to feature co-founding guitarist Anders Björler since 2014's At War with Reality and features Tomas Lindberg's final recordings, who recorded his vocals shortly before his death in 2025.

== Background ==
Following the release of The Nightmare of Being (2021), At the Gates began work on their eighth studio album after guitarist Anders Björler rejoined the band in 2022. Recording progressed intermittently due to vocalist Tomas Lindberg’s diagnosis with adenoid cystic carcinoma in late 2023.

Lindberg recorded vocal demos for the album prior to undergoing surgery, and these performances were later incorporated into the final release. Work on the album had been largely completed by mid-2024, but its release was postponed as Lindberg underwent treatment.

Lindberg died on 16 September 2025, at the age of 52. The band subsequently confirmed that the album would be issued posthumously and would feature his final recordings, and serving as a tribute, fulfilling his wishes for the album’s title, sound, sequencing and artwork.

== Track listing ==
All lyrics are written by Tomas Lindberg; all music is composed by Lindberg, Anders Björler, and Jonas Björler, except Förgängligheten (composed by Anders Björler).

No.	Title	Length
1.	"The Fever Mask"	3:12
2.	"The Dissonant Void"	2:47
3.	"Det oerhörda"	3:35
4.	"A Ritual of Waste"	3:35
5.	"In Dark Distortion"	3:50
6.	"Of Interstellar Death"	3:45
7.	"Tomb of Heaven"	3:53
8.	"Parasitical Hive"	4:34
9.	"The Unfathomable"	4:07
10.	"The Phantom Gospel"	2:44
11.	"Förgängligheten"	2:41
12.	"Black Hole Emission"	3:39
Total length:		42:22

== Personnel ==
Credits are adapted from Tidal, except where noted.

At the Gates

- Tomas Lindberg – lead vocals
- Anders Björler – guitars
- Martin Larsson – guitars (1–10, 12)
- Jonas Björler – bass (tracks 1–10, 12)
- Adrian Erlandsson – drums (1–10, 12)

Additional musicians

- Charlie Storm – keyboards (1)
- Fredrik Wallenberg – background vocals (3)
- Gunnar Hjorth – classical guitar (11)

Additional personnel

- Jens Bogren – production, engineering, mixing
- Alexander Backlund – engineering
- Per Stålberg – engineering (1–10, 12)
- Tony Lindgren – mastering
- Robert Samsonowitz – artwork

== Charts ==
Chart performance for The Ghost of a Future Dead
Chart (2026)	Peak position
Austrian Albums (Ö3 Austria)	9
Belgian Albums (Ultratop Flanders)	85
Belgian Albums (Ultratop Wallonia)	35
Finnish Albums (Suomen virallinen lista)	18
French Physical Albums (SNEP)	44
French Rock & Metal Albums (SNEP)	11
German Albums (Offizielle Top 100)	8
German Rock & Metal Albums (Offizielle Top 100)	4
Japanese Rock Albums (Oricon)	16
Japanese Top Albums Sales (Billboard Japan)	60
Japanese Western Albums (Oricon)	14
Scottish Albums (OCC)	31
Swedish Albums (Sverigetopplistan)	1
Swedish Hard Rock Albums (Sverigetopplistan)	1
Swiss Albums (Schweizer Hitparade)	9
UK Albums Sales (OCC)	32
UK Rock & Metal Albums (OCC)	5
US Top Album Sales (Billboard)	33
