= Terminal Spirit Disease =

Studio album / Live album by At the Gates
- Released: 18 July 1994
- Recorded: February 1994 (studio); 6 February 1994 (live)
- Venue: Magasinet, Gothenburg
- Studio: Studio Fredman
- Genre: Melodic death metal
- Length: 34:46
- Label: Peaceville; Futurist (US)
- Producer: Fredrik Nordström; At the Gates

At the Gates chronology
With Fear I Kiss the Burning Darkness (1993)	Terminal Spirit Disease (1994)	Slaughter of the Soul (1995)

Terminal Spirit Disease is the third studio album by Swedish melodic death metal band At the Gates. It was released on 18 July 1994 by Peaceville Records, with Futurist releasing the album in the United States the same year. It is the first album with rhythm guitarist Martin Larsson, who replaced Alf Svensson in 1993. The band originally wanted to record an EP of new material, but their label insisted on a full-length album. To compromise, the band added three live tracks to pad out the overall length. The album was re-released on 12 August 2003 containing additional live tracks recorded on 27 July 1993.

== Background information ==
Guitarist Anders Björler commented that he couldn't "remember much" from the recording sessions for Terminal Spirit Disease. When compared to At the Gates' older material, Björler felt the tracks "were simpler and more to the point". A violin and cello are featured on the song "And the World Returned", cited as an example of the group's attempt to explore "ideas which were a little different".

== Reception ==
Professional ratings
Review scores
Source	Rating
AllMusic	4/5 stars
Chronicles of Chaos	8/10
Collector's Guide to Heavy Metal	7/10
Kerrang!	3/5 stars
Rock Hard	8.5/10
Metal.de	8/10

Reviews for Terminal Spirit Disease have been mostly positive. AllMusic's Eduardo Rivadavia awarded the album four out of five stars, and claimed that, with this album, "At the Gates raised their creative stakes beyond most everyone's original expectations, and proved that what had once been a pretty standard and uninventive death metal combo was slowly becoming a true contender in the scene." In a retrospective review, Richard Street-Jammer of Invisible Oranges called the album "the last record before they became legends" and "a fetish for crummy metalcore."

The album was inducted into Decibel's "Hall of Fame" in March 2023.

== Track listing ==
All tracks are written by Tomas Lindberg, Anders Björler and Jonas Björler, except for where noted.

No.	Title	Length
1.	"The Swarm"	3:28
2.	"Terminal Spirit Disease"	3:38
3.	"And the World Returned" (Anders Björler)	3:06
4.	"Forever Blind"	3:58
5.	"The Fevered Circle" (Lindberg, Anders Björler, Martin Larsson, Alf Svensson)	4:11
6.	"The Beautiful Wound"	3:52
7.	"All Life Ends" (At the Gates, Svensson) (Live)	5:16
8.	"The Burning Darkness" (Lindberg, Anders Björler, Svensson) (Live)	2:15
9.	"Kingdom Gone" (Lindberg, Anders Björler) (Live)	5:02
Total length:		34:46

The digipak reissue released in 2003 includes three additional live tracks from the 1993 live-in-studio session for MTV Europe.

No.	Title	Length
1.	"Windows" (Live)	3:55
2.	"The Red in the Sky Is Ours/The Season to Come" (Live)	3:12
3.	"The Burning Darkness" (Live)	2:23

== Credits ==
=== Band members ===
- Tomas Lindberg – vocals
- Anders Björler – guitar
- Jonas Björler – bass
- Adrian Erlandsson – drums
- Martin Larsson – guitar

=== Guest members ===
- Peter Andersson – cello on "The Swarm" and "And the World Returned"
- Ylva Wahlstedt – violin on "The Swarm" and "And the World Returned"

=== Production ===
- Fredrik Nordström – production, engineering
- At The Gates – co-production
- Johan Carlsson – assistant engineering
- Frequent Form – artwork, layout
- Alf Svensson – lettering
- Studio Fredman, Gothenburg, Sweden – recording
