= Mamadou Diop (musician) =

Senegalese musician

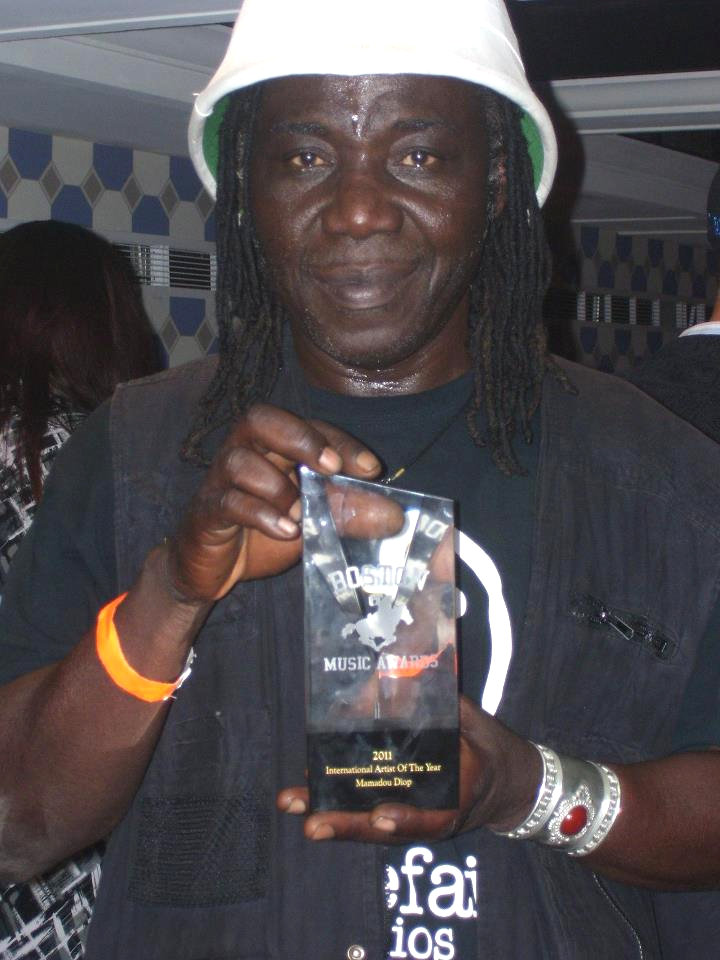
- Mamadou Diop at the 2011 Boston Music Award ceremony

Background information
- Birth name: Mamadou Diop
- Born: February 6, 1954; Guinguinéo, Senegal
- Occupation: Musician
- Instrument(s): Guitar, Djembe, Vocals
- Years active: 1970s–present
- Website: http://www.mamadou.com/

Mamadou Diop, also known as Modou Diop, is a Senegalese performing artist, now living in the United States. With his trademark West African rhythm guitar he has performed with the likes of Thione Seck, Baaba Maal, Jimi Mbaye, Orchestre Baobab, Nicolas Menheim, Papa Seck, the Grand Soda Mama, and many other notable musicians from West Africa. Through his music, he has traveled the world, finally settling in New England just north of Boston, Massachusetts in Salem 1996.

During his musical career in Senegal, Mamadou contributed his talents to support many other professional musicians, both seasoned and well-known artists and up-and-coming artists alike. When he arrived in the United States he formed his own band of musicians. Formed in 1998, the group was known as "Mamadou Diop and the Jolole Band". In 2000, the ensemble simplified their name to "MAMADOU". Mamadou performs regularly with the band MAMADOU, showcasing his unique brand of dance music.

In November 2011, Mamadou Diop was awarded the Boston Music Award as International Artist of the Year.
