= Kurt Reifler =

American musician

- Genres: Rock
- Instruments: Guitar, singing, drums
- Years active: 1998–present
- Website: www.kurtreifler.com

Kurt Reifler is an American entrepreneur, musician, writer, singer, and songwriter. Primarily a solo artist, he's the frontman of the Louisville, Kentucky-based band, Kurt Reifler and The Watchdogs. Reifler is also the singer, guitarist, and songwriter of the rock and roll duo, Kill Kurt Reifler, which features his long-time friend and bandmate, "Kill."

== Musical style ==
Originally a drummer, Reifler's solo music career has been as a rhythm guitarist and singer. He plays drums on his solo recordings. He has listed Jack White, PJ Harvey, Jeff Buckley, and Robert Johnson as his musical influences.

== Recordings ==
In 2007, Reifler released a self-titled album, his first official recording. The music was met with critical acclaim, including All Music's assessment of the album as a "promising debut." Over the following year, Reifler toured consistently on his "48 in '08" tour to support the album.

In 2011, Kill Kurt Reifler released their debut album, "Sure as the Swing of a Pendulum," which the band followed up with multiple Australian and American tours throughout the next year. According to Reifler, the band was formed in Thailand, and the album was recorded in Melbourne, Australia. The newly formed duo was met with favorable reviews including ShortandSweetNYC.com's appraisal: "These guys recorded the album in just three days on analogue tape, producing a rawness that fits the music like a glove. It's a great effort for a new band, especially since they have a presence about them that sounds like they've been doing this forever."

In 2018, Reifler released the EP, "Year Of," the first installment of a double EP entitled, "Year Of/The Bear." The record was described as having "nimble, garage rock swagger" by Skope Magazine. Modern Drummer also featured Reifler, detailing his return to the music industry after a seven-year hiatus.

In 2019, Reifler released the EP, "The Bear," the second installment of the double EP entitled, "Year Of/The Bear." Reifler promoted the new EP on United States tour, including a performance and interview on "Live Lunch" with NPR's affiliate, WFPK.

== Touring ==
Kurt Reifler has toured sporadically throughout the United States, Europe, and Australia. His "48 in '08" tour featured solo performances in each of the Lower 48 states in 2008.

In 2018, Reifler toured the United States in support of Year Of, including a live performance on "Great Day Live," on Louisville, Kentucky's ABC affiliate, WHAS.

In 2019, Reifler toured the United States in support of The Bear, including live performances on NPR's affiliate, WFPK and WHCQ, Louisville.

In 2024 Reifler began touring again after a five-year hiatus and regularly performs throughout the US and Europe once again.

== Discography ==
Kurt Reifler – The Bear, 2019

1. "Welcome" (3:04)
2. "Grandpa's Apple Tree" (2:43)
3. "South Station" (3:45)
4. "Ohio" (3:17)
5. "Water" (4:15)

Kurt Reifler – Year Of, 2018

1. "Aftermath" (3:19)
2. "Backbreaker" (1:42)
3. "Stay Above" (2:37)
4. "Carry On" (3:50)
5. "Hurricane" (4:49)
6. "Ice" (4:14)

Kill Kurt Reifler – Sure as the Swing of a Pendulum, 2011

1. "Are You Ready?" (0:08)
2. "Big Bad Wolf" (4:00)
3. "My Mic" (3:38)
4. "Pendulum" (3:55)
5. "Day or Night" (1:30)
6. "Just Like You" (3:49)
7. "Air" (3:51)
8. "The Shuffle" (4:48)
9. "Matilda" (6:48)
10. "Fuck That" (3:40)

Kurt Reifler – Kurt Reifler, 2007

1. "Every Town" (3:22)
2. "AM" (2:36)
3. "Smile" (4:04)
4. "Arrogance" (3:21)
5. "Dreams" (4:26)
6. "Graceful Exit" (3:42)
7. "Never Be Free" (4:08)
8. "The Horse's Mouth" (3:53)
9. "More Sad Than Strange" (3:28)
10. "Wake Up Dead" (2:54)

Sexred – Warm Sips EP, 2005

1. "Warm Sips" (4:23)
2. "Smile" (6:01)

Of Sound Thought – Time, 2004

1. "Nothing (Part I)" (0:50)
2. "Debonair Pistol" (3:34)
3. "Earthfuck" (4:29)
4. "Time" (3:59)
5. "Machinery of the Ecstasy Release" (1:41)
6. "Shadow Play" (9:37)
7. "Dethroned" (3:39)
8. "Monster" (1:04)
9. "Membrane" (1:10)
10. "Hungry Again" (2:23)
11. "Nothing (Part II)" (0:55)
