= MAMADOU =

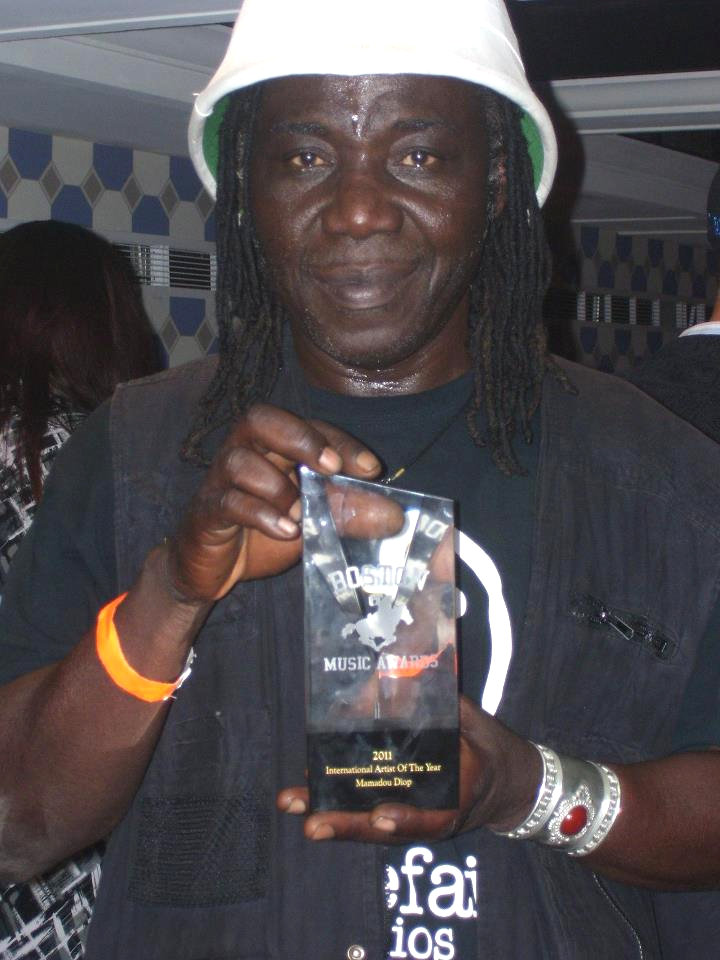
- Mamadou Diop holding the 2011 Boston Music Award after winning the prize as International Artist of the Year

MAMADOU is a Senegalese music band. Originally called "Mamadou Diop and the Jolole Band", the group was founded in early 1998, later simplifying their name to "MAMADOU" in late 2000.

The group began when West African rhythm guitarist and singer Mamadou Diop was introduced to a group of jazz musicians consisting of Czech guitarist Pavel Jirka, bassist John Pfister, and drummer Ted Sillars. Soon afterwards, they changed their format to exclusively original and traditional songs influenced by West African rhythms mixed with cubano, salsa, merengue, reggae, mbalax, and various other styles. Senegalese percussionist Ibrahima Camara was brought in to provide sabar drumming, accompanied by Mamadou and Ted Sillars during "percussion jams". Finally, keyboardist Adam Zampino joined the band. The band has performed extensively throughout the Northeast United States and has released three albums. As of 2016, the current configuration includes Mamadou Diop, keyboardist Adam Zampino, singer and percussionist Michelle Cherie Foss-Zampino, drummer Mitch Cohen, bassist Erik Bistany, and lead guitarist Jake Pardee.

Unlike most other African music groups, this band was started in the United States. They are based in Salem, Massachusetts, and the accompanying musicians are mostly American artists.
