= The Red in the Sky Is Ours =

Studio album by At the Gates
- Released: 27 July 1992
- Recorded: November 1991
- Genre: Death metal
- Length: 45:46
- Label: Peaceville
- Producer: At the Gates

At the Gates chronology
Gardens of Grief (1991)	The Red in the Sky Is Ours (1992)	With Fear I Kiss the Burning Darkness (1993)

The Red in the Sky Is Ours is the debut studio album by Swedish melodic death metal band At the Gates, released on 27 July 1992. It was re-released in 1993 along with With Fear I Kiss the Burning Darkness and then in 2003 with bonus tracks.

== Background and recording ==
At the Gates had been together for one year when they began recording The Red in the Sky Is Ours. In comparison to 1991 EP Gardens of Grief, guitarist Anders Björler feels that The Red in the Sky Is Ours is more structured. In certain instances, Björler deems the record "experimental" nonetheless. At this time, the group's members started to learn about one another musically. Björler was at the time very inspired by guitarist Alf Svensson's ideas, and called them "over the top" and "extremely challenging". However, Björler went on to comment that the group "tried too hard to impress people with too many riffs and weird songwriting".

Björler has criticised the production also, dubbing it "weird" and "very weak-sounding". Alf Svensson recalled the process: "I remember discussing the choice of studio a lot, but I can't remember why we ended up choosing ART Studios. But, after all, it was convenient for us since it was located in Gothenburg. We didn’t really have the money yet (not even a signed record deal, actually), and I remember that the studio was really expensive. After a few days we realized that he [producer Hans Hall] didn't have the first clue about metal. And certainly not death metal. I still remember the surprise on Hans’ face when Tomas started sound checking the vocals for the album. 'Is this the way it is supposed to sound?'"

== Reception ==
Decibel awarded the album an induction into the Decibel Magazine Hall of Fame in September 2014, becoming the second At the Gates album to receive such award.

== Track listing ==
All lyrics are written by Tomas Lindberg, except where noted; all music is composed by Anders Björler and Alf Svensson, except where noted.

No.	Title	Lyrics	Music	Length
1.	"The Red in the Sky Is Ours/The Season to Come"		A. Björler / Traditional	4:41
2.	"Kingdom Gone"			4:40
3.	"Through Gardens of Grief"	Svensson		4:02
4.	"Within"			6:54
5.	"Windows"		A. Björler	3:53
6.	"Claws of Laughter Dead"			4:02
7.	"Neverwhere"	Svensson	Svensson	5:41
8.	"The Scar"		A. Björler	2:00
9.	"Night Comes, Blood Black"			5:16
10.	"City of Screaming Statues" (excluded from vinyl pressings)		A. Björler; Svensson; Jonas Björler	4:37
Total length:				45:46

2003 re-release bonus tracks
No.	Title	Length
11.	"All Life Ends" (live)	5:37
12.	"Kingdom Gone" (live)	4:51
13.	"Ever-Opening Flower" (demo)	5:33

== Personnel ==
At the Gates

- Tomas Lindberg – vocals
- Anders Björler – guitars
- Alf Svensson – guitars
- Adrian Erlandsson – drums
- Jonas Björler – bass
- Tony Andersson – bass (credited but does not perform)

Additional personnel

- Jesper Jarold – violin on "The Season to Come", "Through Gardens of Grief", "Within" and "Neverwhere"

Production

- At the Gates – production, mixing
- Hans Hall – engineering, mixing

Photography

- Göran Björler – front and back cover
- Lisa Hillström (former Haggren) – live photos
