= At War with Reality =

Studio album by At the Gates
- Released: 28 October 2014
- Recorded: 24 June – 18 July 2014
- Studio: • Studio Fredman, Gothenburg; • HVR Studios, Suffolk ("El Altar del Dios Desconocido")
- Genre: Melodic death metal
- Length: 44:16
- Label: Century Media Records
- Producer: Fredrik Nordström

At the Gates chronology
Slaughter of the Soul (1995)	At War with Reality (2014)	To Drink from the Night Itself (2018)

Singles from At War with Reality
- 1. "We Are Connected / Language of the Dead" Released: 31 March 2015

At War with Reality is the fifth studio album and major label debut by Swedish melodic death metal band At the Gates, released on 27 October 2014 for Europe and 28 October 2014 for the USA. It is the band's first album since Slaughter of the Soul (1995), marking the longest gap between two studio albums in their career. It is a concept album based on the literary genre of magic realism.

At War with Reality received positive reviews from music critics, and music videos were released for the songs "Death and the Labyrinth", "Heroes and Tombs", The Book of Sand (The Abomination)" and "The Night Eternal". Up until 2026's The Ghost of a Future Dead, it was the band's last studio album to feature co-founding guitarist Anders Björler, who departed from the band in 2017 before returning in 2022.

== Background ==
After breaking up in 1996, At the Gates announced on 18 October 2007 that they would reunite for several reunion shows in the summer of 2008. Throughout July 2008, they toured the US and Canada on what was dubbed the "Suicidal Final Tour", and the last date of the tour took place in Athens, Greece, with guest The Ocean on 21 September 2008. Despite playing a handful of successful reunion shows, members of at the Gates stated that they would not record a new album, suggesting that it would be "pointless to release something more than ten years after Slaughter of the Soul."

After a two-year hiatus, At the Gates announced their second reunion in December 2010, and that they would do a "limited run of select shows" in 2011. They also announced that they would "stick to the initial promise of not making any more music." Asked in October 2012 about the possibility of new at the Gates material, frontman Tomas Lindberg replied, "Well, basically, I've learned never to say never. We said we'd never do any more shows whatsoever and now we're doing shows [again]. 2008 was the last tour we were going to do and now we are doing more [shows]. I learned not to say never you know."

On 21 January 2014, At the Gates released a distorted video on YouTube showing lines of lyrics on it, followed by text saying "2014", possibly hinting toward possible lyrics for an upcoming album. Six days later, the band revealed on Facebook via a new cover photo and profile picture, that they had signed to Century Media Records, and would begin recording their fifth album At War with Reality in June/July for a tentative October/November 2014 release.

On 14 August, the band announced they had completed the album and that it would be released on 28 October.

In a November 2014 interview, Lindberg was asked whether At War with Reality was at the Gates' final album or the band would continue recording. His response was, "We can't say really. We have no plans of stopping but we've broken promises before so it's best not to say anything."

The band concluded the At War with Reality world tour in August 2016, which had run for almost two years following its release.

The quote on the track "El altar del dios desconocido" is taken from the novel On Heroes and Tombs written by Argentine writer Ernesto Sabato.

== Reception ==
Professional ratings
Aggregate scores
Source	Rating
Metacritic	77/100
Review scores
Source	Rating
AllMusic	3.5/5 stars
Alternative Press	3.5/5 stars
Blabbermouth	8.5/10 stars
Exclaim!	10/10 stars
MetalSucks	5/5 stars
Pitchfork	6.9/10
Punknews.org	4/5 stars
Rock Sound	8/10
Sputnikmusic	2.5/5
Wondering Sound	4/5 stars

Upon release, At War with Reality was received positively by critics. On review aggregator Metacritic, the album received an average score of 77 out of 100 based on 7 reviews, indicating "generally favorable reviews". Ray Van Horn Jr. of Blabbermouth.net rated the album eight-and-a-half stars out of ten, and called it "probably the most anticipated metal album" of 2014. He finished his review by saying that, "At the Gates make mincemeat out of this album and efficiently plot most of their songs to wrap in far less time than their acolytes. The average song on At War with Reality clocks in between two-and-a-half and four minutes, yet all feel like far more has transcended. That's something special. Inadvertently and unfairly credited for the ascension of metalcore, At the Gates releases a demonstrative comeback album that's simply metal, forget the 'core-rellations."

At War with Reality was at the Gates' first album to chart in multiple countries. It peaked at number three on the Swedish chart Sverigetopplistan and reached number 53 on the US Billboard 200.

== Track listing ==
All lyrics are written by Tomas Lindberg except where noted; all music is composed by Anders Björler and Jonas Björler

No.	Title	Lyrics	Music	Length
1.	"El Altar del Dios Desconocido" ("The Altar of the Unknown God")	Ernesto Sabato	A.Björler	1:06
2.	"Death and the Labyrinth"		A.Björler	2:33
3.	"At War with Reality"		A.Björler	3:09
4.	"The Circular Ruins"		A.Björler / J.Björler	4:28
5.	"Heroes and Tombs"		A.Björler / J.Björler	3:59
6.	"The Conspiracy of the Blind"		J.Björler / A.Björler	3:19
7.	"Order from Chaos"		A.Björler / J.Björler	3:26
8.	"The Book of Sand (The Abomination)"		A.Björler	4:28
9.	"The Head of the Hydra"		J.Björler / A.Björler	3:38
10.	"City of Mirrors" (instrumental)		J.Björler / A.Björler	2:06
11.	"Eater of Gods"		A.Björler	3:51
12.	"Upon Pillars of Dust"		A.Björler	2:39
13.	"The Night Eternal"		J.Björler / A.Björler	5:37
Total length:				44:16

Limited digipak and mediabook edition
No.	Title	Music	Length
1.	"El Altar del Dios Desconocido" ("The Altar of the Unknown God")		1:06
2.	"Death and the Labyrinth"		2:33
3.	"At War with Reality"		3:09
4.	"The Circular Ruins"		4:28
5.	"Heroes and Tombs"		3:59
6.	"The Conspiracy of the Blind"		3:19
7.	"Order from Chaos"		3:26
8.	"The Book of Sand (The Abomination)"		4:28
9.	"Language of the Dead" (bonus track)	A.Björler	4:10
10.	"The Skin of a Fire" (bonus track)	A.Björler	4:14
11.	"The Head of the Hydra"		3:38
12.	"City of Mirrors" (instrumental)		2:06
13.	"Eater of Gods"		3:51
14.	"Upon Pillars of Dust"		2:39
15.	"The Night Eternal"		5:37
Total length:			52:38

Limited artbook edition bonus disc
No.	Title	Music	Length
1.	"Language of the Dead"	A.Björler	4:09
2.	"The Skin of a Fire"	A.Björler	4:14
3.	"Re-Animation" (Sacrifice cover)		3:38
4.	"Eater of Gods" (demo)		3:49
Total length:			15:50

Japanese edition
No.	Title	Length
1.	"El Altar del Dios Desconocido" ("The Altar of the Unknown God")	1:06
2.	"Death and the Labyrinth"	2:33
3.	"At War with Reality"	3:09
4.	"The Circular Ruins"	4:28
5.	"Heroes and Tombs"	3:59
6.	"The Conspiracy of the Blind"	3:19
7.	"Order from Chaos"	3:26
8.	"The Book of Sand (The Abomination)"	4:28
9.	"Language of the Dead" (bonus track)	4:10
10.	"The Skin of a Fire" (bonus track)	4:14
11.	"The Head of the Hydra"	3:38
12.	"City of Mirrors" (instrumental)	2:06
13.	"Eater of Gods"	3:51
14.	"Re-Animation" (bonus track, Sacrifice cover)	3:38
15.	"Upon Pillars of Dust"	2:39
16.	"The Night Eternal"	5:37
Total length:		56:16

== Personnel ==
Credits are adapted from the album's liner notes.

At the Gates

- Tomas Lindberg – vocals
- Anders Björler – guitar
- Martin Larsson – guitar
- Jonas Björler – bass
- Adrian Erlandsson – drums

Production

- Costin Chioreanu – artwork, design
- Jens Bogren – mixing, mastering
- Fredrik Nordström – producer, recording, engineering
- Henrik Udd – recording, engineering
- Johan Henriksson – recording, editing

El Altar del Dios Desconocido

- Anton Reisenegger – spoken word
- Danny Biggin – recording
- Charlie Storm – mixing

== Charts ==
Chart (2014–2015)	Peak position
Austrian Albums (Ö3 Austria)	39
Belgian Albums (Ultratop Flanders)	78
Belgian Albums (Ultratop Wallonia)	162
Finnish Albums (Suomen virallinen lista)	15
French Albums (SNEP)	175
German Albums (Offizielle Top 100)	25
Swedish Albums (Sverigetopplistan)	3
Swiss Albums (Schweizer Hitparade)	51
UK Rock & Metal Albums (OCC)	13
US Billboard 200	53
US Independent Albums (Billboard)	10
US Top Hard Rock Albums (Billboard)	4
US Top Rock Albums (Billboard)	9
US Indie Store Album Sales (Billboard)	11
