= At the Gates =

Swedish melodic death metal band

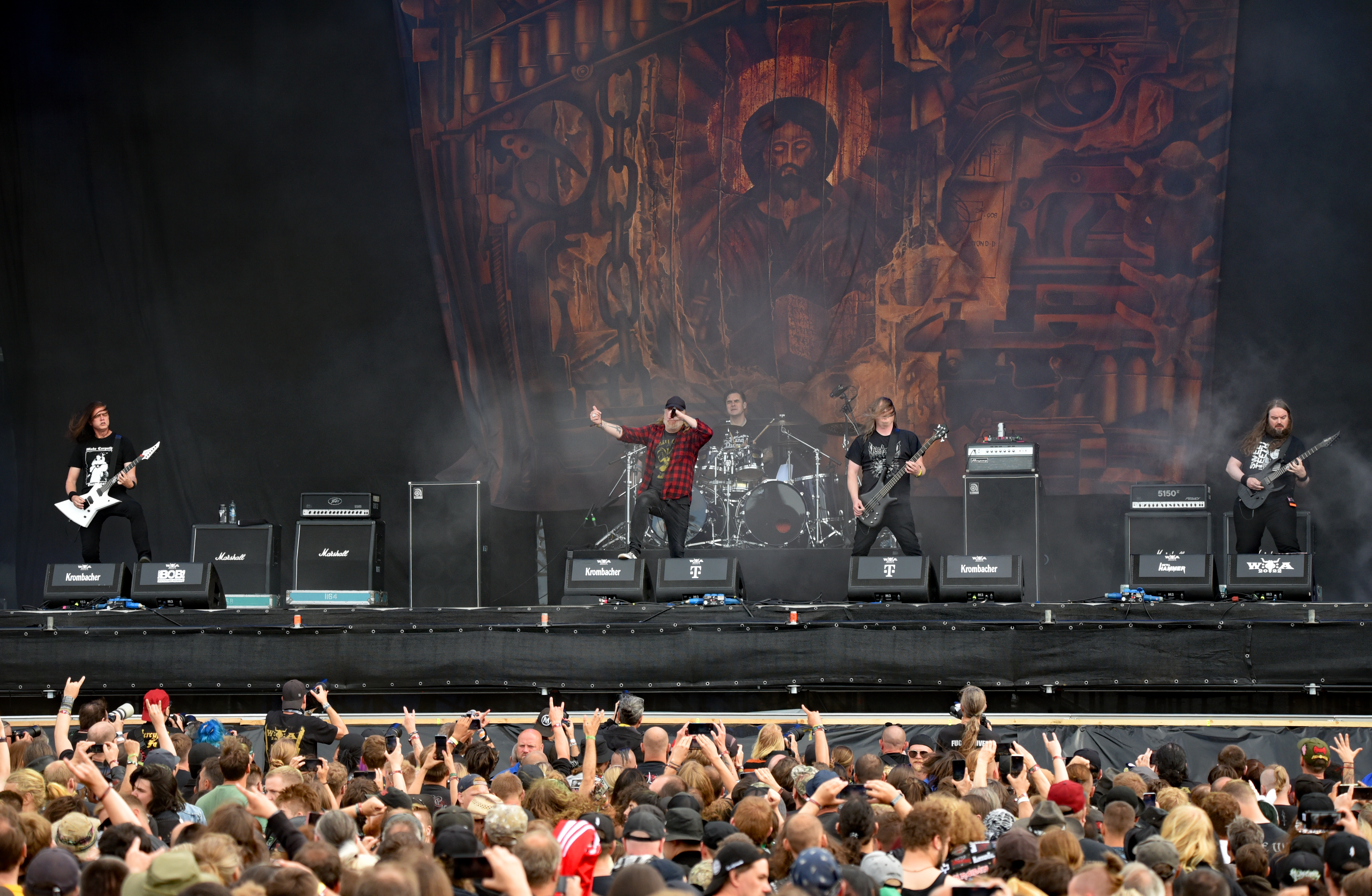
- At the Gates at Wacken Open Air 2022

Background information
- Origin: Gothenburg, Sweden
- Genre: Melodic death metal
- Years active: 1990–1996; 2007–2008; 2010–present
- Labels: Century Media; Earache; Peaceville
- Members: Anders Björler; Jonas Björler; Adrian Erlandsson; Martin Larsson
- Past members: Tomas Lindberg; Alf Svensson; Björn Mankner; Jonas Stålhammar
- Website: www.atthegates.se

At the Gates is a Swedish melodic death metal band from Gothenburg, formed in 1990. The band was a progenitor of the mid-90s Gothenburg Sound with Dark Tranquillity and In Flames. Prior to their first disbandment in 1996, At the Gates released four albums, the last being Slaughter of the Soul (1995). The album has been seen as a landmark in the mid-1990s Swedish death metal scene. After reuniting in 2007, for what was initially a one-off tour in 2008, the band continued performing and released four additional studio albums: At War with Reality (2014), To Drink from the Night Itself (2018), The Nightmare of Being (2021) and The Ghost of a Future Dead (2026).

== History ==
=== Early career (1990–1994) ===
Former members of the death and black metal band Grotesque formed At the Gates in late 1990. They recorded a debut EP, Gardens of Grief, for the Dolores record label. The EP led Peaceville Records to sign the band, and they released their debut album, The Red in the Sky Is Ours, in 1992.

After recording their second studio album, With Fear I Kiss the Burning Darkness, founding member and guitarist Alf Svensson left the band in 1993 to pursue tattoo artistry, graphic novel illustration, and his solo electronic-opera-black metal project, Oxiplegatz. He was replaced with former House of Usher guitarist Martin Larsson, whom the band knew from underground tape trading. The band continued touring Europe, and were filmed for a Headbangers Ball special feature in Nottingham, England in July 1993.

=== Success and breakthrough (1994–1996) ===
In 1994, At the Gates released their third album, Terminal Spirit Disease, which was hailed as a breakthrough album.

The band continued touring, and in 1995 released their most commercially and critically successful album, Slaughter of the Soul, on Earache Records. The album is regarded as their strongest death metal effort, compared to previous albums. This album rooted the band as one of the leaders of the Swedish metal scene, the "Gothenburg sound" of melodic death metal. The band received international attention for the album, gaining them several U.S. tours and rotation of the music video for "Blinded by Fear" on MTV in the United States. Despite this international success, Anders Björler departed in 1996. According to Lindberg, Björler departure was a result of the pressure of the success of the album, but also of the record company, Earache Records, to go back to the studio. The remaining members decided not to continue without him and the band broke up.

=== Breakup and reunion (1996–2008) ===
When At the Gates broke up in 1996, drummer Adrian Erlandsson, bassist Jonas Björler, and guitarist Anders Björler formed The Haunted. Tomas Lindberg worked with different bands, including Skitsystem, The Crown, Lock Up, and Nightrage. Erlandsson left The Haunted in 1999 to join Cradle of Filth. In 2001, Peaceville Records released an At the Gates retrospective called Suicidal Final Art.

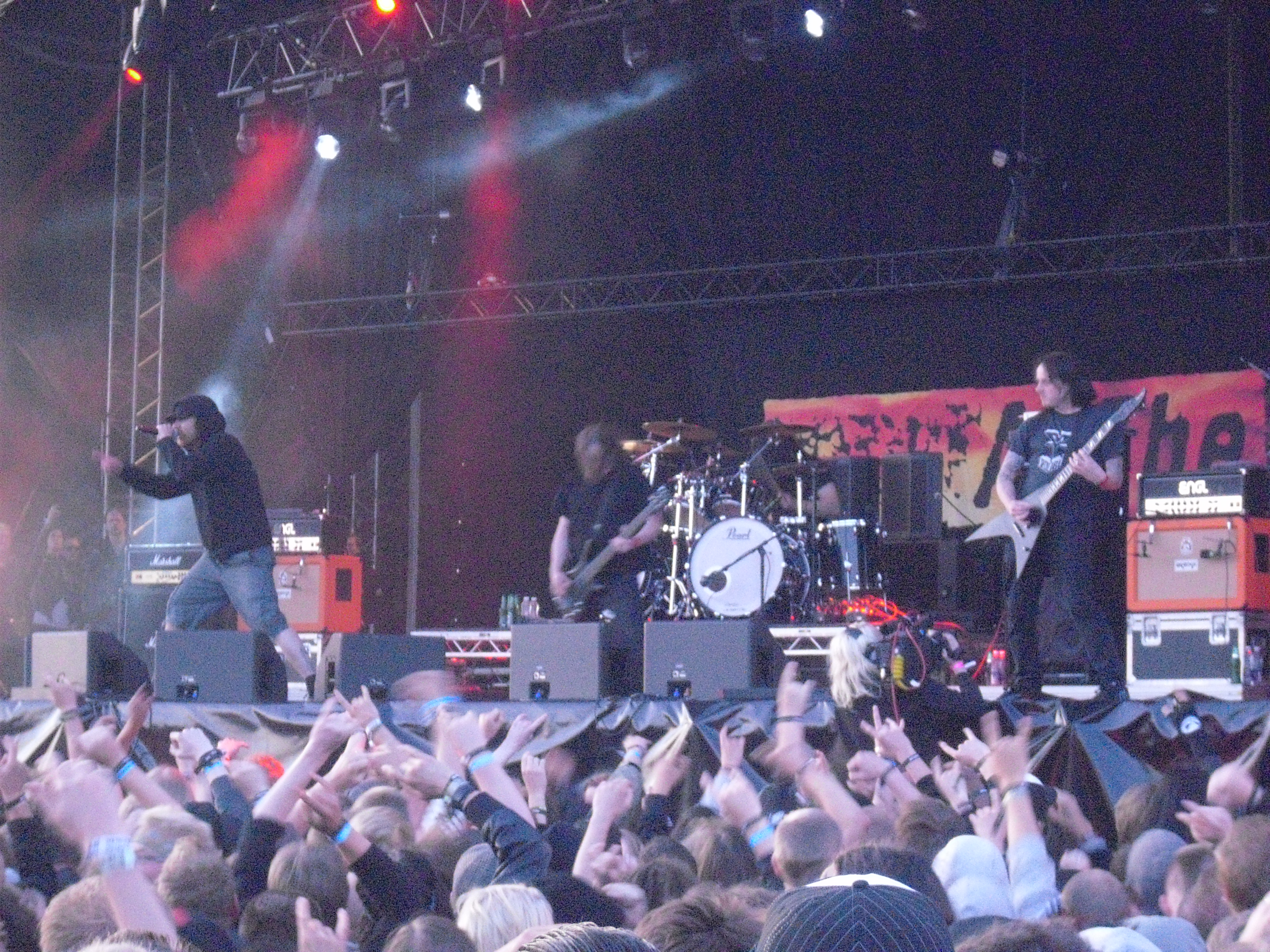
At the Gates performing live at Metaltown Festival in June 2011

On 18 October 2007, At the Gates announced several reunion shows for mid-2008, including Getafe Electric Festival, Roskilde Festival, Ruisrock, Wacken Open Air, Graspop Metal Meeting, Sweden Rock Festival, Gods of Metal, Hellfest Summer Open Air and Bloodstock Open Air, as well as a tour of Japan with The Dillinger Escape Plan, Into Eternity, Pig Destroyer, and Mayhem in May 2008. Throughout July 2008, they toured the US and Canada on the "Suicidal Final Tour", and played their final UK show at Bloodstock Open Air on Sunday on 17 August 2008. They finished their last show in Athens, Greece, with guest The Ocean on 21 September 2008. The band's performance at Wacken Open Air in 2008 is available on The Flames of the End DVD boxed set, which also includes clips of songs from other venues and a documentary that covers the history of the band in its entirety.

=== Second era and later albums (2012–2021) ===
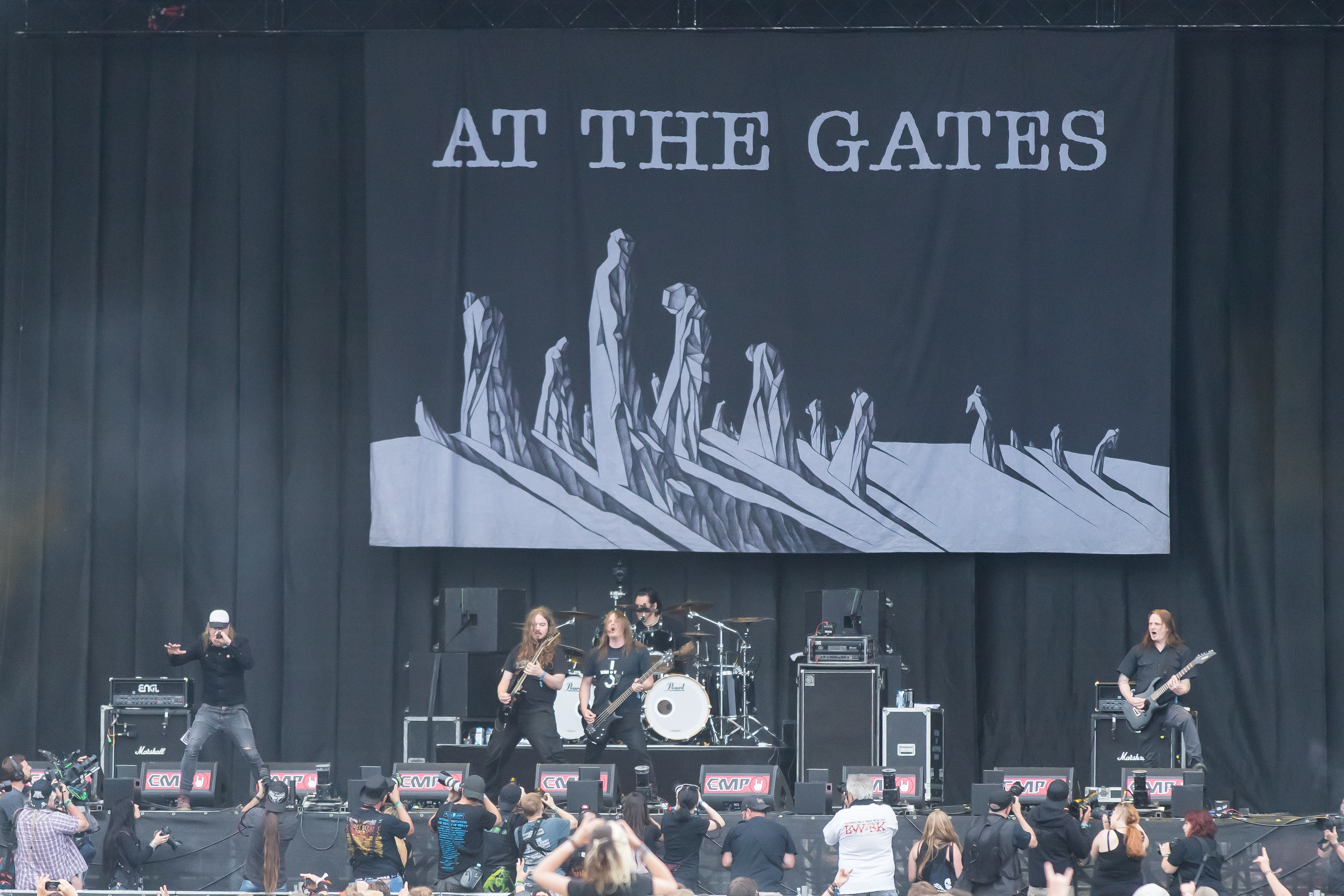
At the Gates live at Summer Breeze Open Air in 2016

In a 2012 interview, Lindberg stated that the band had learned "never to say never" regarding future activities, suggesting that further releases were possible. On 21 January 2014, At the Gates released a video on YouTube showing a distorted video with lines of text on it, followed by text saying "2014", hinting toward an upcoming album. On 27 January, the band revealed on Facebook, via a new cover photo and profile picture, that their confirmed fifth record would be titled At War with Reality and would be released in the fall of 2014 through Century Media. The album was released on 27 October 2014 in Europe, and on 28 October 2014 for USA.

When asked whether At War with Reality was At the Gates' final album or if the band would continue recording, Lindberg replied, "We can't say really. We have no plans of stopping but we've broken promises before so it's best not to say anything." In numerous interviews, members of the band expressed interest in a follow-up album. In support of the album, the band toured throughout 2015 and 2016, performing at major metal festivals including Wacken Open Air, Brutal Assault, Damnation Festival, and the 70000 Tons of Metal cruise.

On 8 March 2017, the band officially announced the departure of guitarist Anders Björler, and confirmed that they were working on a follow-up to 2014’s At War with Reality, which they aimed to record and release in 2018. In September 2017, Jonas Stålhammar was announced as the new, permanent guitarist, though he joined too late to be involved in the writing process of the new album. The album, titled To Drink from the Night Itself, was recorded between November 2017 and January 2018 at Parlour Studios in Kettering, England, with additional recording in Gothenburg, Sweden, and was released through Century Media Records on 18 May 2018. In support of To Drink From the Night Itself, At the Gates had an extensive 2018 tour, performing across Europe, Asia, and North America, including appearances at major metal festivals such as Graspop Metal Meeting, Hellfest, Resurrection Fest, and Tuska, followed by a North American tour with Behemoth and Wolves in the Throne Room.

After completing touring in support of To Drink from the Night Itself, the band continued writing new material. According to Lindberg, creative work on what would become The Nightmare of Being began during the tour to support the previous album and continued into 2020, with the global COVID-19 pandemic providing additional time for reflection and refinement of the songs.

At the Gates released their seventh studio album, The Nightmare of Being, on 2 July 2021. While the album is rooted in the Gothenburg metal tradition, it incorporaties a wider range of musical styles and influences, with lyrics influenced by the writings of horror philosophers such as Thomas Ligotti and Eugene Thacker.

=== The Ghost of a Future Dead and death of Lindberg (2022–present) ===
On 23 July 2022, At the Gates announced the departure of Stålhammar. On 5 October, the band announced that original guitarist Anders Björler had rejoined the band. Following Björler's return, the band stated that they had begun work on their eighth studio album. The band toured in the summer of 2023.

In August 2025, the band disclosed that Lindberg had been diagnosed with adenoid cystic carcinoma (mouth/palate cancer) in December 2023, and was receiving treatment, including surgery and radiotherapy. This was cited as the main reason the band went silent, and it also slowed down the work on the new album in the years that followed.

On 16 September 2025, Lindberg died at the age of 52 following complications related to his cancer treatment, as confirmed by the band on social media and reported in music press outlets. According to reports, the band had completed work on their forthcoming eighth studio album before his major surgery, with Lindberg recording his vocal tracks in a single day shortly before the procedure.

Dark Tranquillity played At the Gates' "Blinded by Fear" in the Swedish part of their "Gallery/Character" tour in October 2025, as a tribute to Tomas Lindberg.

On 18 February 2026 the band revealed the title of their eighth album, The Ghost of a Future Dead. The album was released in April 2026 via Century Media Records. The album features Lindberg’s final vocal recordings, which were completed as demos prior to surgery and later incorporated into the finished release. According to bassist Jonas Björler, the material had been fully mixed by mid-2024 but was withheld in hopes that Lindberg’s condition would improve.

The band members have stated that they are uncertain regarding the future of At the Gates.

== Musical style ==
At the Gates' musical style has been described as melodic death metal, a style that combines the aggression of death metal with strong melodic guitar harmonies and comparatively concise song structures. The band "matched brutality with melody, intricate guitar harmonies with feral and ferocious riffs".

The band’s early albums, The Red in the Sky Is Ours (1992) and With Fear I Kiss the Burning Darkness (1993), featured a more progressive and experimental way of crafting song of dextrous melodic fluidity and variation, incorporating complex arrangements, unusual melodic phrasing, and atmospheric elements uncommon in death metal at the time. Most of these recordings were composed by Alf Svensson, who, according to guitarist Anders Björler, blended death and extreme metal with the Swedish melancholy of Nordic folk music and classical harmony.

Beginning with Terminal Spirit Disease (1994) and culminating in Slaughter of the Soul (1995), At the Gates adopted a more streamlined and aggressive musical direction, focusing on tightly constructed songs, sharp rhythmic precision, and harmonized dual-guitar leads. Slaughter of the Soul in particular has been widely cited as a defining melodic death metal release, with raw sounds, balancing accessibility with extremity.

Lindberg’s distinctive high-pitched, anguished delivery has been identified as a key element of the band’s sound, setting At the Gates apart from contemporaries who favored lower growled vocals. Lyrically, the band has been noted for focusing on existential, philosophical, and religious themes.

== Legacy and influence ==
At the Gates are widely considered to be one of the principal architects of the Gothenburg melodic death metal scene, alongside bands such as Dark Tranquillity and In Flames. Eli Enis of Revolver wrote: "In many ways, At the Gates are the melodic death-metal band," stating the belief that the band's style had been imitated hundreds, if not thousands of times.

They are widely regarded as one of the most influential bands in the development of the scene, particularly through the impact of their 1995 album Slaughter of the Soul. Critics have described the album as a blueprint for subsequent melodic death metal acts and a major influence on the emerging metalcore scene of the late 1990s and early 2000s, particularly in North America. Steve Huey of AllMusic called it "a stripped-down, no-frills melodic death album that hit all the basic points of the style".

Their early work would also influence the technical death metal scene, but also the black metal scene - e.g. it inspired Darkthrone's Transilvanian Hunger.

== Band members ==
Current

- Anders Björler − lead guitar (1990–1996, 2007–2008, 2010–2017, 2022–present)
- Jonas Björler − bass, keyboards, acoustic guitar, backing vocals (1990–1992, 1993–1996, 2007–2008, 2010–present), drums (1990)
- Adrian Erlandsson − drums (1990–1996, 2007–2008, 2010–present)
- Martin Larsson − rhythm guitar (1993–1996, 2007–2008, 2010–present)

Former

- Tomas Lindberg − lead vocals (1990–1996, 2007–2008, 2010–2025; his death)
- Alf Svensson − rhythm guitar (1990–1993)
- Björn Mankner − bass (1990)
- Cliff Lundberg − bass (1992)
- Jonas Stålhammar − lead guitar, keyboards, backing vocals (2017−2022)

Session/touring

- Jesper Jarold − violin (1991–1992)
- Tony Andersson − bass (1992)
- Dirk Verbeuren – drums (2019)
- Ola Englund – bass (2019)
- Patrik Jensen – lead guitar (2022)
- Daniel Martinez – lead guitar (2022)

Timeline

== Discography ==
Studio albums

- The Red in the Sky Is Ours (1992)
- With Fear I Kiss the Burning Darkness (1993)
- Terminal Spirit Disease (1994)
- Slaughter of the Soul (1995)
- At War with Reality (2014)
- To Drink from the Night Itself (2018)
- The Nightmare of Being (2021)
- The Ghost of a Future Dead (2026)

== Awards and recognition ==
At the Gates were nominated for a Grammis (Swedish Grammy) for Slaughter of the Soul in 1996, but did not win. They won the Grammis in February 2015 for the 2014 comeback album At War with Reality.

The band also received the Metal Hammer Golden Gods Inspiration Award in June 2015.

Three At the Gates albums have been inducted into Decibel magazine’s Hall of Fame:

- Slaughter of the Soul (2005)
- The Red in the Sky Is Ours (2014)
- Terminal Spirit Disease (2023)
