= With Fear I Kiss the Burning Darkness =

Studio album by At the Gates
- Released: 7 May 1993
- Recorded: April 1993
- Genre: Death metal
- Length: 45:29
- Label: Peaceville
- Producer: At the Gates

At the Gates chronology
The Red in the Sky Is Ours (1992)	With Fear I Kiss the Burning Darkness (1993)	Terminal Spirit Disease (1994)

Professional ratings
Review scores
Source	Rating
AllMusic	2.5/5 stars
Collector's Guide to Heavy Metal	7/10
Rock Hard	8.5/10

With Fear I Kiss the Burning Darkness is the second studio album by Swedish melodic death metal band At the Gates. It was re-released in 1993 with The Red in the Sky Is Ours and again in 2003 with bonus tracks. This would be the last album with guitarist Alf Svensson who left the band after its release.

== Background information ==
Guitarist Anders Björler described With Fear I Kiss the Burning Darkness as the band's "darkest album", and deemed its production "heavier" than the group's previous work.

Vocalist Tomas Lindberg said of the album cover: "The cover [...] is probably my favorite. It is a piece of art made by Swedish author/artist/composer Åke Hodell. The piece is called 220 Volt Buddha. Åke approved for us to use it for free, after inquiring about the music of the band and our approach, as soon as he understood that we were a non-commercial act. He has composed several pieces of abstract music, written radio plays and novels. You could consider him a modernist along the lines of Vladimir Mayakovsky. It was an honour for me to work with him and I think the blue tone matches the abstract music on the album perfectly. Åke died in 2000. He is greatly missed."

== Track listing ==
All lyrics are written by Tomas Lindberg, except where noted; all music is composed by Alf Svensson and Anders Björler, except where noted.

No.	Title	Lyrics	Music	Length
1.	"Beyond Good and Evil"		Svensson, A. Björler, Adrian Erlandsson	2:42
2.	"Raped by the Light of Christ"		A. Björler	2:58
3.	"The Break of Autumn"	Svensson, Lindberg		4:59
4.	"Non-Divine"			4:44
5.	"Primal Breath"	Svensson	Svensson	7:22
6.	"The Architects"	A. Björler, Lindberg	A. Björler	3:30
7.	"Stardrowned"			4:02
8.	"Blood of the Sunsets"			4:33
9.	"The Burning Darkness"			2:16
10.	"Ever-Opening Flower"			4:59
11.	"Through the Red" (contains a hidden cover of "The Nightmare Continues" by Discharge)			3:26
Total length:				45:29

2003 re-release bonus tracks
No.	Title	Length
12.	"Neverwhere (Live)"	6:04
13.	"Beyond Good and Evil (Live)"	2:42
14.	"The Architects (Demo)"	3:29
15.	"The Nightmare Continues (Demo)" (hidden track; Discharge cover)	1:15

== Personnel ==
=== At the Gates ===
- Anders Björler − guitar
- Jonas Björler − bass
- Adrian Erlandsson − drums
- Alf Svensson − guitar
- Tomas Lindberg − vocals

=== Additional personnel ===
- Matti Kärki − vocals on "Ever-Opening Flower"
- Åke Hodell − artwork
- Noel Summerville − mastering
- Eric Gunewall − photography
- Tomas Skogsberg − production
- Fred Estby, Lars Linden, Tomas Skogsberg − recording
