= Slaughter of the Soul =

Studio album by At the Gates
- Released: 14 November 1995
- Recorded: May–July 1995
- Studios: Studio Fredman, Gothenburg, Sweden
- Genre: Melodic death metal
- Length: 34:10
- Label: Earache
- Producer: Fredrik Nordström

At the Gates chronology
Terminal Spirit Disease (1994)	Slaughter of the Soul (1995)	At War with Reality (2014)

Slaughter of the Soul is the fourth studio album by Swedish melodic death metal band At the Gates, released on 14 November 1995 by Earache Records. It was their last album before their eleven-year breakup from 1996 to 2007. Slaughter of the Soul is considered a landmark in melodic death metal, particularly the scene in Gothenburg. The album is widely considered one of the key influences on the American Metalcore scene that rose to popularity in the early 2000s.

== Recording ==
Going into recording sessions the band aimed to push themselves to make a metal album as great as the best albums of the genre. The band sought to depart from the technical and complex style of their first two albums, with lead singer Tomas Lindberg saying "...for us, it was a case of not cluttering up the music with a lot of unnecessary baggage. We wanted to be more direct, to be more brutal."

The album was recorded with Fredrik Nordström at Studio Fredman in 1995. At The Gates asked Nordström to buy a 24-track mixing desk because they felt the album was a watershed, which caused some tension. They spent 3 weeks getting their rhythm guitar tone and 3 days recording the vocals. The band also contacted Andy LaRocque for a guest solo on "Cold", which guitarist Anders Björler admitted he still could not play properly in 2007.

== Reception ==
=== Critical reception ===
Professional ratings
Review scores
Source	Rating
About.com	4.5/5 stars
AllMusic	5/5 stars
Collector's Guide to Heavy Metal	8/10
Rock Hard	7/10

Reviews for Slaughter of the Soul have been highly positive, acclaiming the album as a landmark in the development of the Swedish death metal scene. AllMusic's Steve Huey awarded the album five stars and called it an "excellent example of Gothenburg-style melodic death metal, and certainly the band's best and most focused album to date." According to Vlad Nichols of Ultimate Guitar, At the Gates "officiated the birth of the characteristic Gothenburg sound" with Slaughter of the Soul. Slaughter of the Soul is considered a landmark in melodic death metal and played a major role in popularizing the Gothenburg scene, alongside The Jester Race by In Flames and The Gallery by Dark Tranquillity. Music journalist T Coles described the album's sound as "melodic and weird", saying that At the Gates were "cleaner" than fellow Swedish death metal band Entombed, yet "dirtier" than the technical death metal bands of the United States.

Rock Hard, however, thought the band had become interchangeable with its many clones, and Deathmetal.org labeled it At the Gates' sellout album, sounding like "Metallica attempting ...And Justice For All in a stylistic mashup between Iron Maiden and Judas Priest during Painkiller."

=== Accolades ===
In 2005, the album was ranked number 300 in Rock Hard magazine's book of The 500 Greatest Rock & Metal Albums of All Time. Metal Injection ranked Slaughter of the Soul eighth on their list "Top 10 Influential Heavy Metal Albums". The album was inducted into the Decibel Magazine Hall of Fame in March 2005, being the second album overall to receive such award. In 2017, Rolling Stone ranked Slaughter of the Soul as 79th on their list of "The 100 Greatest Metal Albums of All Time". The same magazine later ranked the title track number eighty-seven on their list of "The 100 Greatest Heavy Metal Songs of All Time"

=== Appearances ===
- "Blinded by Fear" was made available as downloadable content for the Rock Band video game series on 28 March 2008. Later, it was included in the game's retail "Metal Track Pack" add-on content disc, released on 22 September 2009 in North America. The song is considered one of the most difficult songs in the series to perform on drums, due to its fast tempo.
- The title track can be heard on the Liberty City Hardcore station in Grand Theft Auto IV: The Lost and Damned.

=== Covers ===
"Blinded by Fear" was covered by The Haunted (composed largely of ex-At the Gates members) on the Japanese version of their live/double disc album Live Rounds in Tokyo, and was also covered by Fleshgod Apocalypse on their Mafia EP.

== Reissues ==
A 2002 reissue contained 11 tracks from the original 1995 release of Slaughter of the Soul, plus six bonus audio tracks. Three of the bonus tracks were covers, two were demos, and one was a previously unreleased track recorded during the Slaughter of the Soul sessions. The 2006 reissue contained everything from the 2002 reissue, plus a bonus DVD featuring a 35-minute behind-the-scenes documentary. The 2008 reissue contains everything from the 2002 and 2006 rereleases (all audio and DVD material), as well as additional DVD footage of an eight-song live set, recorded in Kraków, Poland on 30 December 1995.

== Track listing ==
All lyrics are written by Lindberg; all music is composed by A. Björler and J. Björler, except where noted.

No.	Title	Music	Length
1.	"Blinded by Fear"	A. Björler	3:12
2.	"Slaughter of the Soul"		3:02
3.	"Cold"		3:27
4.	"Under a Serpent Sun"	A. Björler	4:00
5.	"Into the Dead Sky" (instrumental)		2:12
6.	"Suicide Nation"	A. Björler	3:35
7.	"World of Lies"	A. Björler, J. Björler, Larsson	3:35
8.	"Unto Others"		3:11
9.	"Nausea"	A. Björler	2:23
10.	"Need"		2:36
11.	"The Flames of the End" (instrumental)	A. Björler, Johansson, Lindberg	2:57
Total length:			34:10

2002 reissue bonus tracks
No.	Title	Writer(s)	Length
12.	"Legion" (Slaughter Lord cover)		3:54
13.	"The Dying" (Unreleased track from Slaughter of the Soul sessions)		3:18
14.	"Captor of Sin" (Slayer cover)	Hanneman, King	3:19
15.	"Unto Others" ('95 Demo)		3:06
16.	"Suicide Nation" ('95 Demo)		3:22
17.	"Bister Verklighet" (No Security cover)		1:55

2006 reissue bonus DVD
No.	Title	Length
1.	"Making of Slaughter of the Soul"
2.	"Deleted Scenes"
3.	"Blinded by Fear" (music video)

2008 reissue bonus DVD
No.	Title	Length
1.	"Terminal Spirit Disease" (live in Kraków, Poland)
2.	"Cold" (live in Kraków, Poland)
3.	"The Swarm" (live in Kraków, Poland)
4.	"Blinded by Fear" (live in Kraków, Poland)
5.	"Nausea" (live in Kraków, Poland)
6.	"Forever Blind" (live in Kraków, Poland)
7.	"Need" (live in Kraków, Poland)
8.	"Kingdom Gone" (live in Kraków, Poland)
9.	"Making of Slaughter of the Soul"
10.	"Deleted Scenes"
11.	"Blinded by Fear" (music video)

== Personnel ==
Writing, performance and production credits are adapted from the album's liner notes.

At the Gates

- Tomas Lindberg − vocals
- Anders Björler − guitar, phaser drums on "Into the Dead Sky"
- Martin Larsson − guitar
- Jonas Björler − bass
- Adrian Erlandsson − drums

Additional personnel

- Andy LaRocque − guitar solo on "Cold"

Production

- Fredrik Nordström − production
- At the Gates – co-production
- Noel Summerville − mastering
- Kristian Wåhlin − artwork, logo
- Absolute Design Associates – additional artwork and layout
- Frequent Form – logo concept
- Studio Fredman, Gothenburg, Sweden – recording, mixing
- Transfermation – mastering

== Charts ==
Chart	Peak position
Japanese Albums (Oricon)	200
