= Martin Larsson (guitarist) =

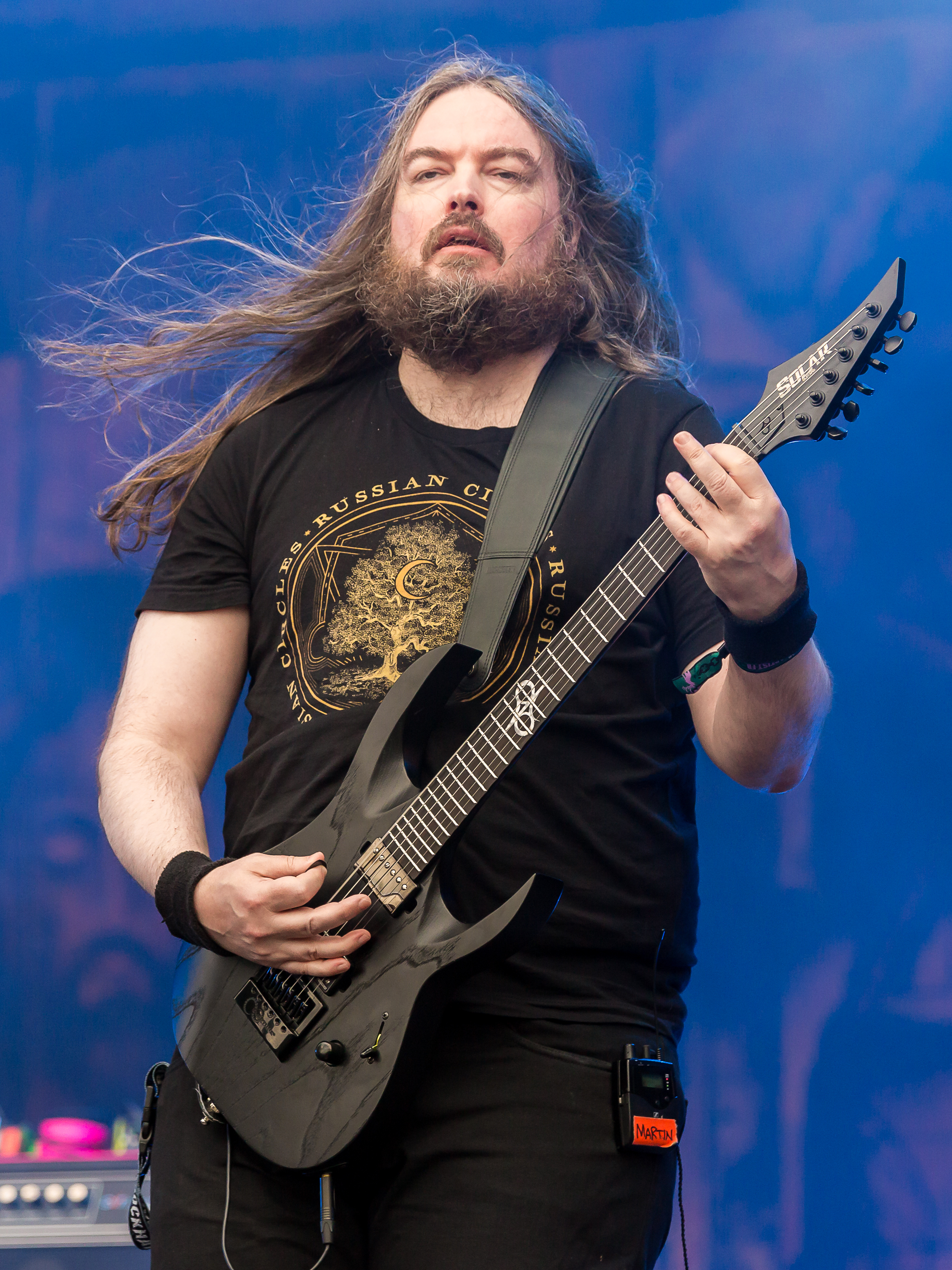
- Larsson performing in 2022

Background information
- Birth name: Martin Larsson
- Born: 1973; Sweden
- Origin: Sweden
- Genres: Death metal
- Occupation: Musician
- Instrument: Guitar

Martin Larsson is a Swedish heavy metal guitarist. He initially played in The House of Usher from 1990 to 1993. After the band split up, he joined At the Gates, and was their guitarist until they broke up in 1996, and again when they reunited in 2007.

== At the Gates (1993-1996, 2007-present) ==
Guitarist Alf Svensson parted ways with At the Gates during 1993. Members of the group knew Larsson; they had "met him" during concerts, and had played alongside Larsson's group The House of Usher on one or two occasions. According to bandmember Anders Björler, Larsson "felt like a good substitute. When asked what each At the Gates member contributed to the group's overall sound, Björler said that Larsson "didn't write that much music, though he's a great guitarist". Larsson was present for At the Gates' reunion tour in 2008. The band has continued playing live since, and released their fifth album At War with Reality in late 2014.

== Discography ==
=== With The House of Usher ===
- On the Very Verge - EP (1991)
- When Being Fucked With - Demo (1993)
- Promo 2 1993 - Demo (1993)

=== With At the Gates ===
- Terminal Spirit Disease (1994)
- Slaughter of the Soul (1995)
- Cursed to Tour - Split live EP with Napalm Death (1996)
- Suicidal Final Art - Compilation (2001)
- At War with Reality (2014)
- To Drink from the Night Itself (2018)
- The Nightmare of Being (2021)

=== With Agrimonia ===
- Rites of Separation (2013)
- Awaken (2018)
