= Alf Svensson (guitarist) =

Swedish heavy metal guitarist (born 1967)

- Born: Alf Svensson; 23 February 1967 (age 59)
- Origin: Sweden
- Genres: Death metal, crust punk
- Occupation: Musician
- Instrument: Guitar

Alf Svensson is a Swedish heavy metal guitarist. He initially played in Oral from 1984 to 1989. He temporarily entered Grotesque and Liers in Wait before joining At the Gates in 1990. He was their guitarist until 1993, in 1994, he reformed Oral to record an EP. He then formed Oxiplegatz, and went on to release three albums under this name. He currently works as art director in First Planet Company (MMO Entropia Universe).

== At the Gates (1990–1993) ==
Bandmember Anders Björler accredits Svensson as a "major songwriter" for At the Gates' first three albums, saying he believes that "he is a great musician", and expressed admiration for Svensson's music. One of the unique composition techniques he used was recording himself playing a part and then playing it back to himself backwards and using the parts which appealed to him. This technique, according to Tomas "Tompa" Lindberg, vocalist for At the Gates, Grotesque, Disfear, and other bands, was probably used for parts of their songs Through Gardens of Grief, Night Comes, Blood Black (both in The Red in the Sky is Ours), and Break of Autumn (With Fear I Kiss the Burning Darkness). In terms of Svensson's contribution to At the Gates, Björler feels that the guitarist "definitely brought the dark and epic segments" to At the Gates' "overall sound".

Björler commented that some of Svensson's ideas for At The Gates' debut album The Red in the Sky Is Ours "were over the top", and went on to say "that it was very strange music". Svensson parted ways with the group during 1993. According to Anders Björler, Svensson left as he was "tired of the whole thing" and wished to focus efforts on his tattoo studio. In later years, Svensson quit his tattoo studio so that he could pursue a career in 3D modelling on behalf of a computer game company. Svensson believed he could better express himself through visual art than through music, as he stated in an interview of him for Oxiplegatz.

== Discography ==
=== With At the Gates ===
- Gardens of Grief – EP (1991)
- The Red in the Sky Is Ours (1992)
- With Fear I Kiss the Burning Darkness (1993)

==== Singles ====
- "Kingdom Gone" (1992)
- "The Burning Darkness" (1993)

=== With Grotesque ===
- Incantation EP (1990)
- In the Embrace of Evil (recorded in 1989, 1990 and 1996; released in 1996)

=== With Oral ===
- Slagen i Blod – EP (1994)

=== With Oxiplegatz ===
- Fairytales (1994)
- Worlds and Worlds (1996)
- Sidereal Journey (1998)
