= Wacken Open Air =

German heavy metal music festival

Coordinates: 54°01′42″N 9°21′22″E

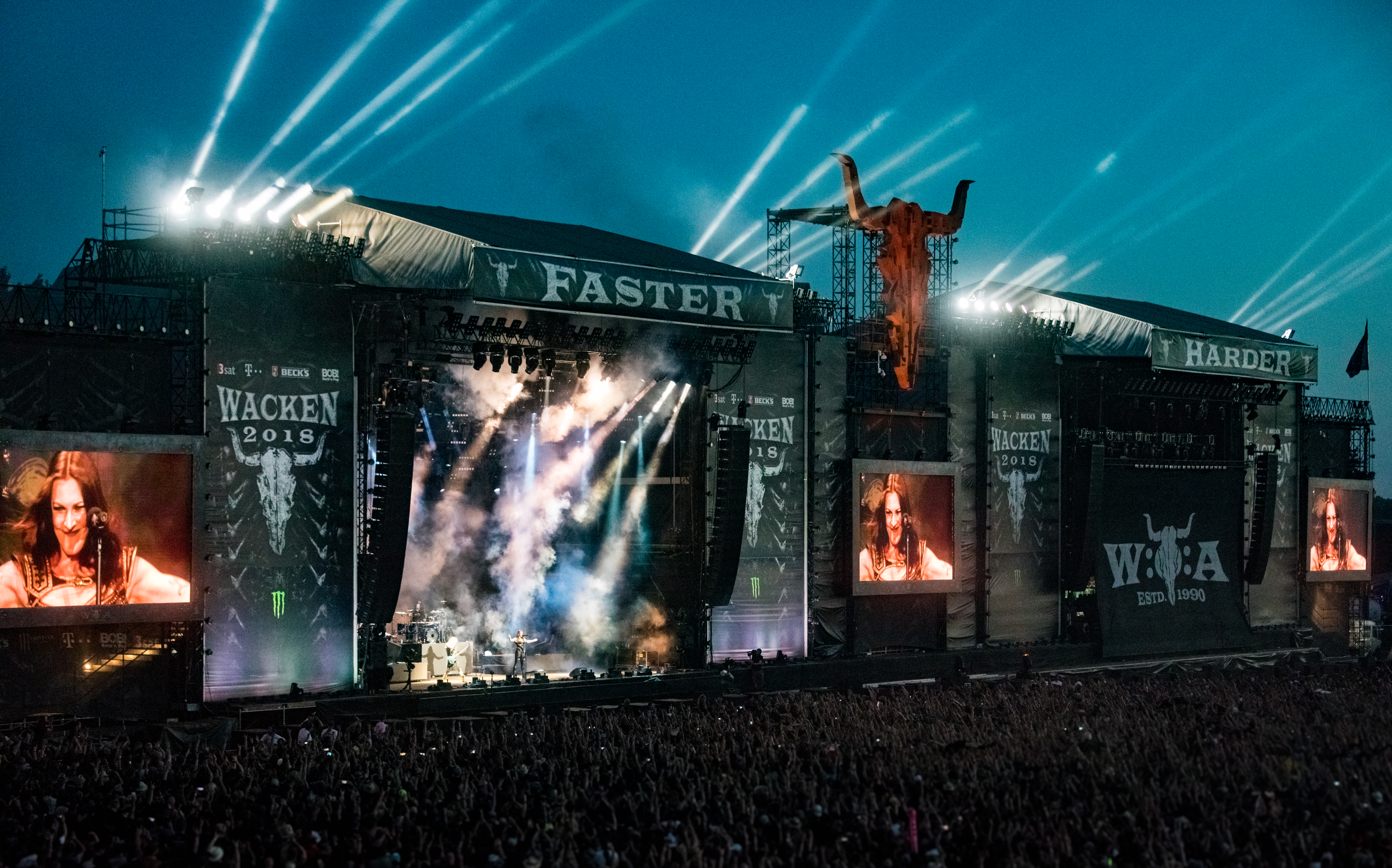
- Wacken Open Air 2018, with its two main stages and the iconic Wacken skull symbol
- Genre: Heavy metal; extreme metal; hard rock
- Dates: late July to early August
- Locations: Wacken, Steinburg, Germany
- Years active: 1990–present
- Attendance: c.85,000
- Website: wacken.com

We Are the Metalheads (2009)
The official Wacken Hymn, performed by Doro and Skyline

Wacken Open Air (/ˈvɑːkən/, abbreviated as W:O:A) is a heavy metal music festival, held yearly since 1990 on the first weekend of August in the village of Wacken in Schleswig-Holstein, Germany. It has been called the world's biggest metal festival, or the "Mecca of heavy metal".

The four-day event involves around 200 bands, is attended by around 85,000 metalheads from more than 80 countries, and takes place on a 240-hectare site including campgrounds. Wacken has two main stages and several smaller stages, as well as areas with stalls, beer tents and entertainment; including a medieval-themed 'Wackinger' village and apocalyptic-themed 'Wasteland'.

Wacken Open Air has long focused on traditional heavy metal and extreme metal genres such as power metal, speed metal, thrash metal, death metal, black metal, doom metal, industrial, symphonic and folk metal. Locals had always been involved with the festival. However, in recent years Wacken has included more mainstream and alt-metal bands as headliners, become more commercialized and attracted non-metalhead 'festival tourists', upsetting long-time attendees.

Several documentaries have been made about Wacken, and many bands have recorded live albums at the festival. WOA also runs the Wacken Metal Battle, an international battle of the bands contest for unsigned bands.

== History ==
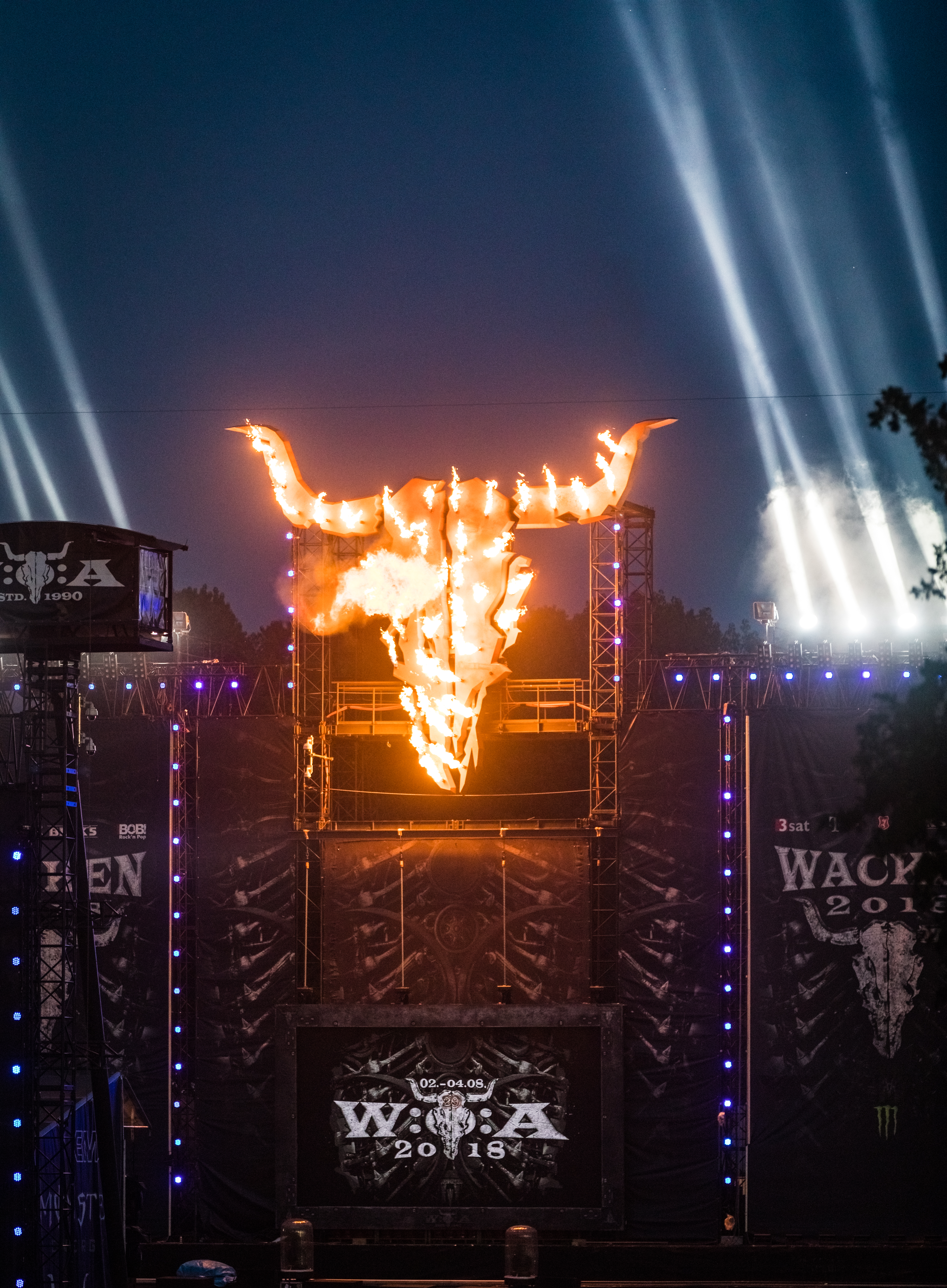
The flaming bull head skull has long been a symbol of Wacken Open Air

=== Background ===
The idea for Wacken Open Air was conceived in 1989 when Thomas Jensen and Holger Hübner visited a restaurant together. Both lived in Wacken and were friends, Jensen played the electric bass with rock cover band Skyline. From its beginnings until 1992, the band was composed of Ines Jeske from Vaale (vocals), Thomas Jensen from Wacken (bass), Peter Huhn from Wacken (electric guitar), Dennis Schoppe from Itzehoe (keyboard), and Andreas Göser from Wacken (drums). Skyline was one of the first regional Metal and Rock cover bands at that time. The band was regionally known, working its way from appearances in village pubs and gigs at biker meetings up to an appearance as supporting band of "Extrabreit". Hübner was a disc jockey with a focus on Rock music and Heavy Metal.

Jensen and Hübner developed the idea to organise an open-air concert in a gravel pit in Wacken and persuaded Skyline drummer Andreas Göser and Jörg Jensen, Thomas Jensen's brother, to help make it happen. The pit had previously been used as a meeting venue for up to 3,000 members of biker club 'No Mercys', and hence was suited for their plans and gave an opportunity to attract motorcycle fans. From the beginning, the focus of the event would be on Rock and Metal, and in contrast to other single-day festivals such as Monsters of Rock or Super Rock in Mannheim, there would also be camping grounds.

=== Early years and growth ===
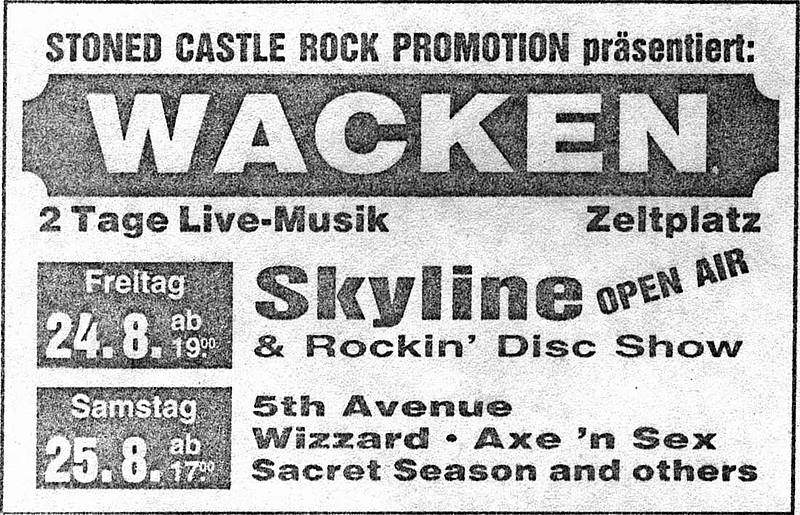
Advertisement for Wacken Open Air in 1990

The first two-day festival took place in the gravel pit on 24 and 25 August 1990 and barely had 800 visitors. The performing bands all hailed from Germany, and apart from Skyline, bands like 5th Avenue, Motoslug, Sacred Season, Axe 'n Sex, and Wizzard played. The first festivals were organised privately, with the technology being built on a trailer borrowed from a local trucking company and the stage being a DIY construction.

In subsequent years, too, most of the tasks were carried out by the small team. Until August 1994, for example, ticket orders were organised privately by Andy Göser's mother Regina Göser and security duties were performed by friendly motorcycle clubs up until 1996. In 1991, the number of visitors increased to 1,300, and with Skyline returning, Bon Scott, an AC/DC cover band from Hamburg, Gypsy Kyss, Kilgore, Life Artist, Ruby Red, and Shanghai'd Guts joined them on stage for an all-regional roster. That same year, the skull logo was designed by Mark Ramsauer after the basic shape had been determined by Thomas Jensen and Holger Hübner. The cow skull refers to the venue, a meadow for cows, and to Jensen and Hübner as "boys from the village".

In 1992, the programme changed to include internationally renowned bands such as Blind Guardian and Saxon for the first time, and the number of bands rose to 26, listing bands from Sweden, the US, Ireland, and Belgium. The organisers used a professional stage with lighting and PA for the first time and secured cigarette brand Prince Denmark as a sponsor. That year, the Party Stage was set up in the DJ tent next to the main stage, where cover bands and fun projects were to perform exclusively. The additional post-concert costs for refuse disposal on the campground and the significantly enlarged security, among other things, meant that the organisers recorded a loss of around 25,000 D-Mark that year.

With the reunion of the band Fates Warning at the festival in 1993, Wacken Open Air had a special feature and also made a name for itself in the following years with unusual band constellations and reunions. At the same time, Doro Pesch and other well-known bands made for interesting appearances, which resulted in a new record attendance of 3,500 customers. Simultaneously, the team tried concert organisation and, under the moniker Stoned Castle Promotion, held a Motörhead concert for 2,000 people in Flensburg. A show with Dio/Freak of Nature became a disaster with only 167 tickets sold, and together with the Open Air, which again recorded a minus, the organisers incurred debts of around 350,000 D-Mark. As a result, Jörg Jensen and Andreas Göser left the team; Holger Hübner and Thomas Jensen remained, as did Jörn-Ulf Goesmann for another two years, continuing to run the Wacken Open Air despite the debts for which their parents had provided guarantees. During the same year, Thomas Jensen's mother died and Holger Hübner had a serious accident; the year went down in Wacken history as the "year of the plague".

On its fifth anniversary in 1994, the financial situation stabilised and the festival finally broke even. The line-up remained professional and featured many internationally known bands from the metal scene. 4,500 tickets were sold. Due to the rising costs of refuse disposal, tickets for the camping grounds had to be purchased separately, and pre-orders received a free T-shirt. The festival was not profitable. However, for the first time, national media became aware of Wacken Open Air, especially Rock Hard magazine and the TV station VIVA with its Heavy Metal programme Metalla.

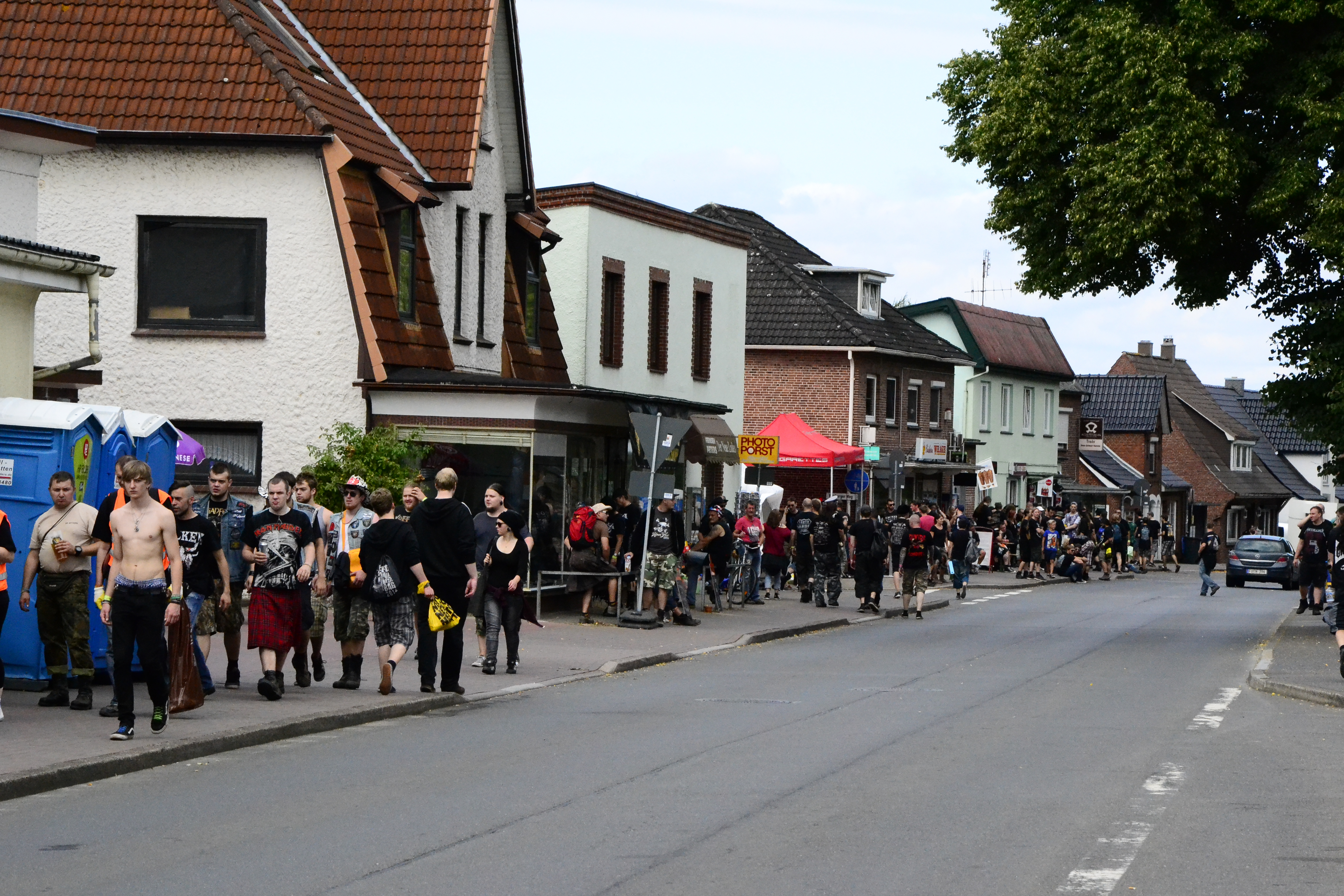
Metalheads on the main street of Wacken village, 2014

Ticket sales for the 1996 festival again started sluggishly, despite a headliner like Kreator and numerous internationally renowned bands such as The Exploited, Gorefest, and Crematory. Management tried to prevent another loss by securing more acts and finally managed to get Böhse Onkelz to perform. The engagement of the controversial band also led to criticism, and some bands cancelled their gig in Wacken that year. Cologne band Brings cancelled at short notice, and offered to refund their fans' ticket prices.

As a result of many visitors flooding the village in 1996, the inhabitants of Wacken voiced their concern over an event of this size being held in the local gravel pit. Uwe Trede offered to relocate the festival site to his own property and the areas previously used as campgrounds and took care of the acquisition of additional land. With the W.E.T.-Stage, a third stage was set up in 1997. The "Wacken Evolution Tent" was to be made available primarily to newcomers and bands without record deals. That year, the number of visitors reached 10,000 for the first time, with Rockbitch's erotic stage show causing a scene.

=== Peak years ===
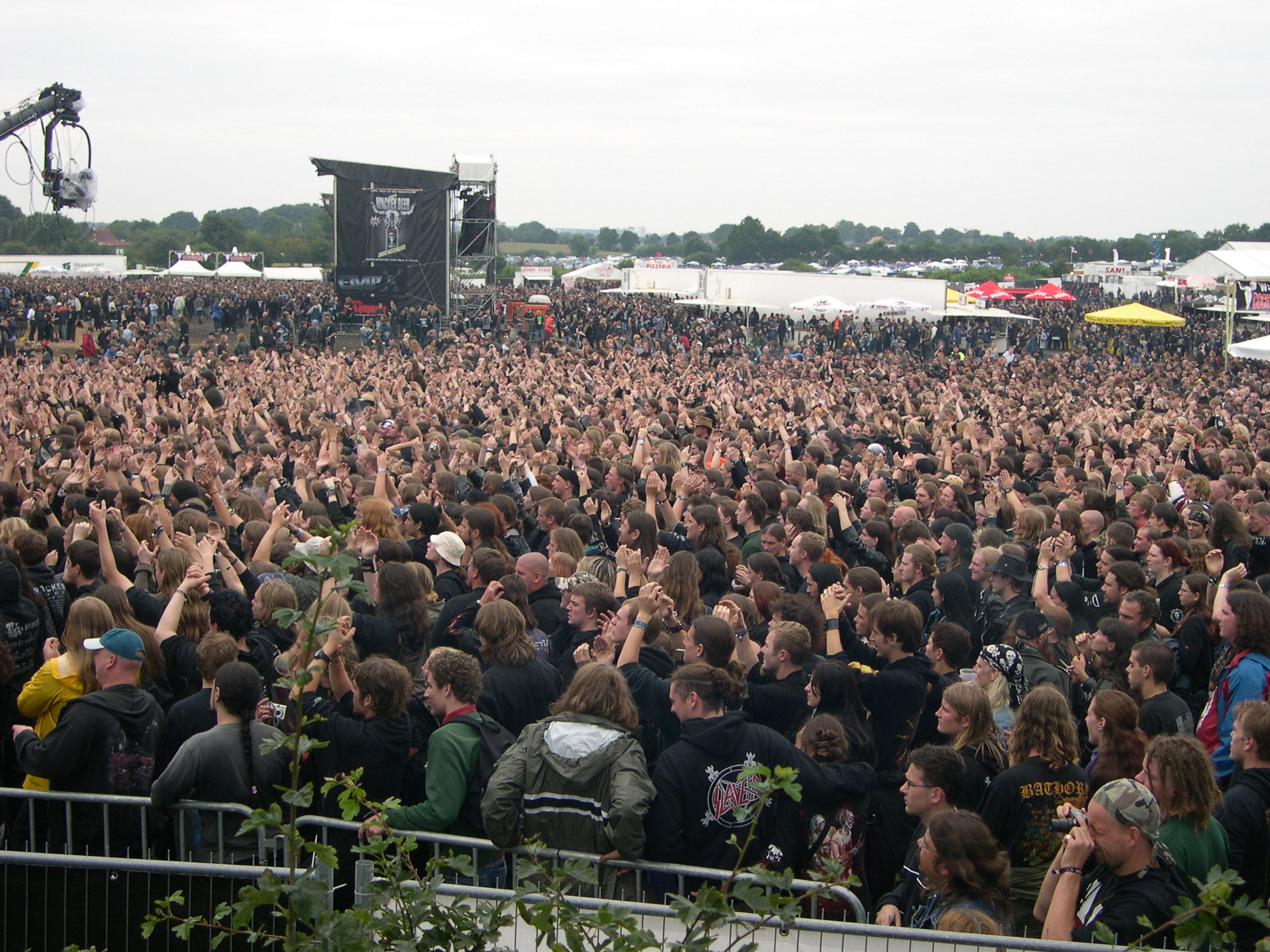
W:O:A 2005 was attended by 40,000 people.

Over the years, the size of Wacken Open Air has grown continuously, and now dozens of bands and tens of thousands of visitors flock to the festival. Even though the organisers said in 2006 that 62,500 visitors were "the limit of what is possible", changes were made to the structure of the festival grounds the following year by allocating a larger area to the "Party Stage". In addition, tickets could no longer be purchased directly on the festival grounds to reduce the number of spontaneous or ticketless visitors. In 2007 and 2008, the festival had already sold out as a result of advance ticket sales; for W:O:A 2009, tickets had even sold out by the end of 2008. The tickets for 2010, too, sold out months in advance.

While the festival originally only lasted two days, the performances have been lasting from Thursday to Saturday, i.e., three days, for some years. Thursday became a "Night to Remember", with mainly "classical" Heavy Metal bands appearing, such as the Scorpions in 2006. On the actual Party Stage, younger and more modern bands play as a contrast to the "Night to Remember". In addition, the event is accompanied by a rich complementary programme; in addition to a merchant area – obligatory for music festivals – a beer garden has been operating since 2000, in which the Wacken Firefighters' marching band opens the festival before its official start. On Thursday in 2007, the "Hellfest Stage" was initiated. Since 2009, there has been a "Medieval Stage", where mainly Medieval and Folk Metal bands play.

The fact that many well-known bands, including the Scorpions, Saxon, Twisted Sister, Dimmu Borgir, Slayer, and Helloween, have recorded live DVDs at Wacken, shows how esteemed the Open Air has since become. Ahead of their farewell tour in 2004, Die Böhsen Onkelz also performed an extended set at W:O:A.

Since 2002, the so-called "Metal Train" has been travelling from Munich to Wacken and back before and after the festival to bring fans to the Northern German village and provide a matching entertainment programme. Bus tours from Scandinavian countries, especially Zurich and Sweden, but also from Austria, are organised each year and used by several hundred fans.

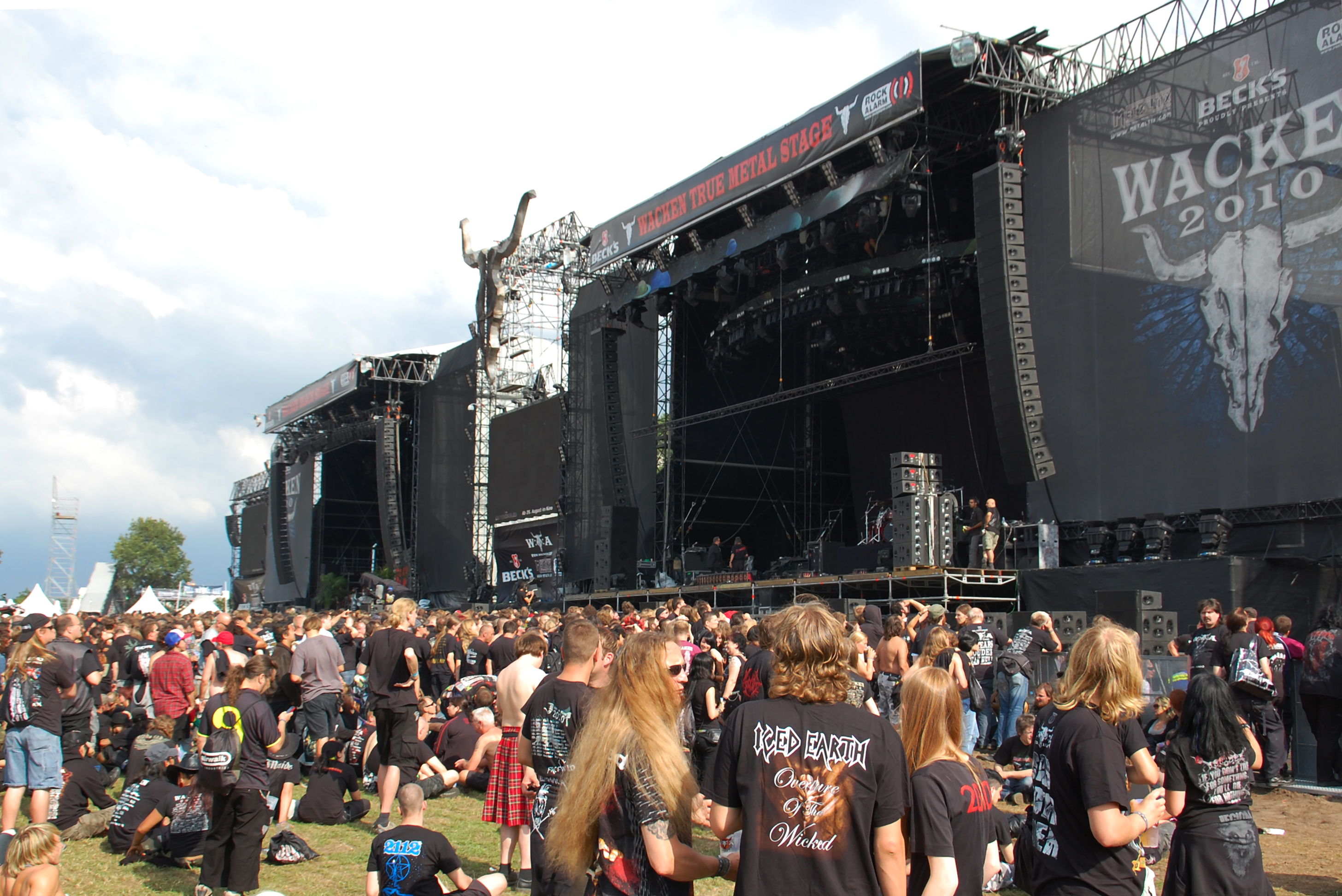
Wacken Open Air 2010

The "W:O:A Soccercup" has been taking place annually since 2002. This football tournament, which started with nine teams and takes place on Wednesdays, has grown over the years and has been held in World Cup mode with 32 teams since 2007 (a one-off event in 2011 featured 36 teams). The international teams register in advance and are composed of festival visitors. For the tournament's 15th anniversary in 2016, a band was featured and took part for the first time: Serum 114 formed a team with several fans and were able to win the tournament. Although it is meant to be a fun tournament, in which creative outfits and names take precedence over athletic performance, the award ceremony after the tournament has been held on one of the stages since 2013 and prizes can be won.

The festival is one of the Metal scene's highlights of the year. Nowadays, about a third of the visitors, some of whom arrive quite some time before the official start of the festival, and the majority of the bands come from abroad. According to the organisers, 2018 saw visitors from more than 80 nations attending the festival.

The number of participants increased to 75,000 in 2008 and included 65,000 paying guests. In 2008, the festival sold out twice (W:O:A 2008 in spring and W:O:A 2009 on 31 December 2008).

As is common with festivals of this size, Wacken Open Air received criticism for its hygienic conditions, prices, security personnel, as well as for the overcrowding and commercial orientation of the event. These points of criticism were addressed by making further substantial investments in the festival's fixed and mobile infrastructure. In 2008, the organisers also contributed 1,000,000 Euros to the expansion of Wacken's local outdoor swimming pool in order to make the festival even more attractive to the residents and visitors of the town.

Since 2006, the festival has been running an online radio station called Wacken Radio, which broadcasts Metal music around the clock. It is being produced in cooperation with RauteMusik as of February 2014.

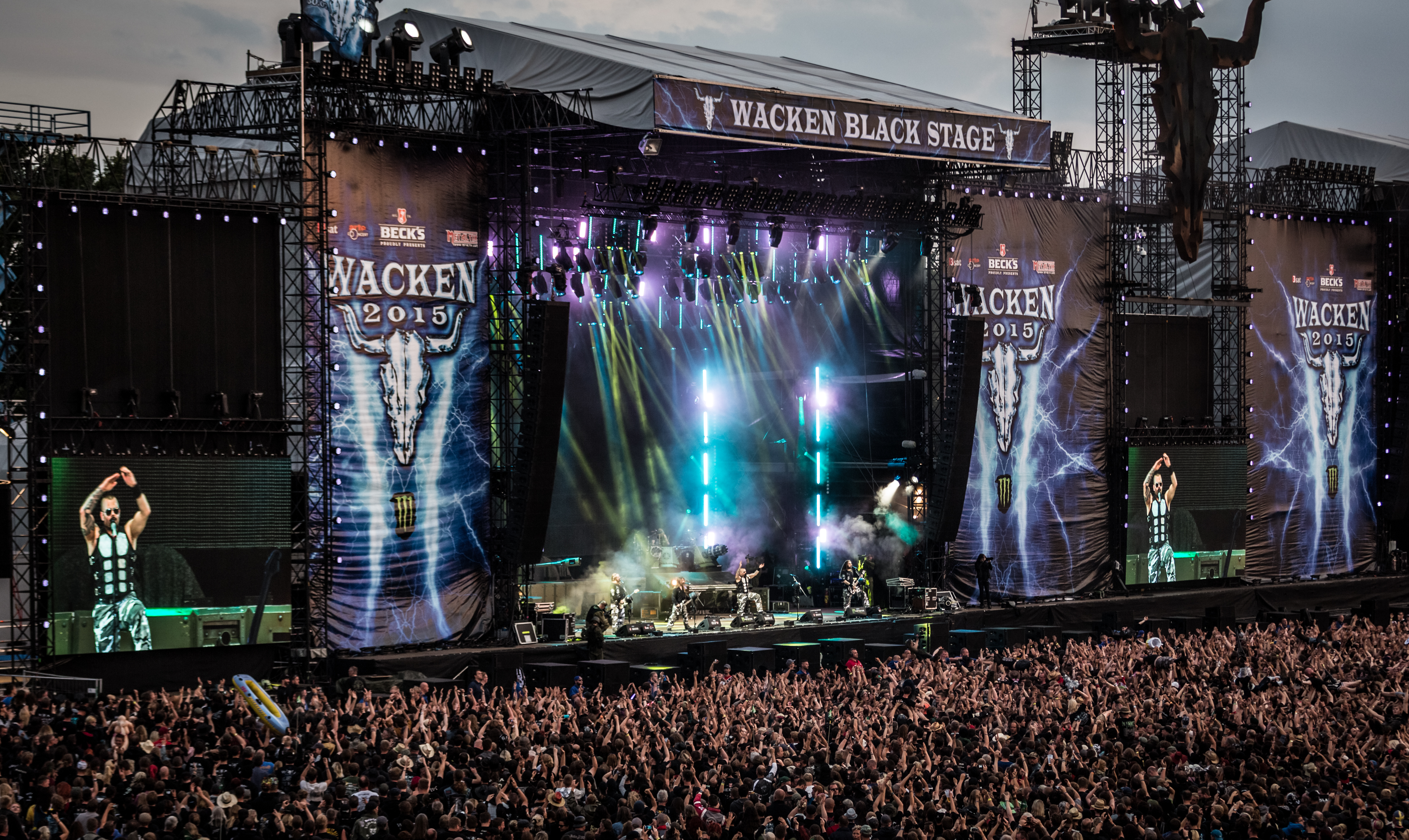
Sabaton at Wacken Open Air 2015

The event sold out ten times in a row between 2006 and 2015. For the 23rd edition of Wacken Open Air, the sale of an "X-Mas Package" started on Monday, 8 August 2011, shortly after the end of that year's festival, and was sold out within 45 minutes. Tickets for Wacken Open Air 2015 sold out after just 12 hours on 4 August 2014 – just a few hours after the end of W:O:A 2014. The X-Mas Tickets for W:O:A 2016, which cost 10 Euros less and whose buyers were entitled to a free T-shirt, were completely sold out only 20 minutes after the start of pre-sales. Booking office Metaltix' servers were highly busy. In the minutes before the start of the pre-sale, the pages were no longer accessible; after that, data traffic had to be limited by wait lists.

In 2013, the "Full Metal Church" took place in Wacken for the first time. Marking the local church's 150th anniversary, the team, together with the parish, organised a concert by the band Faun, which was framed by two readings and sermons by "Volxbibel" author Martin Dreyer. Both the concert and the services were completely overcrowded by festival visitors.

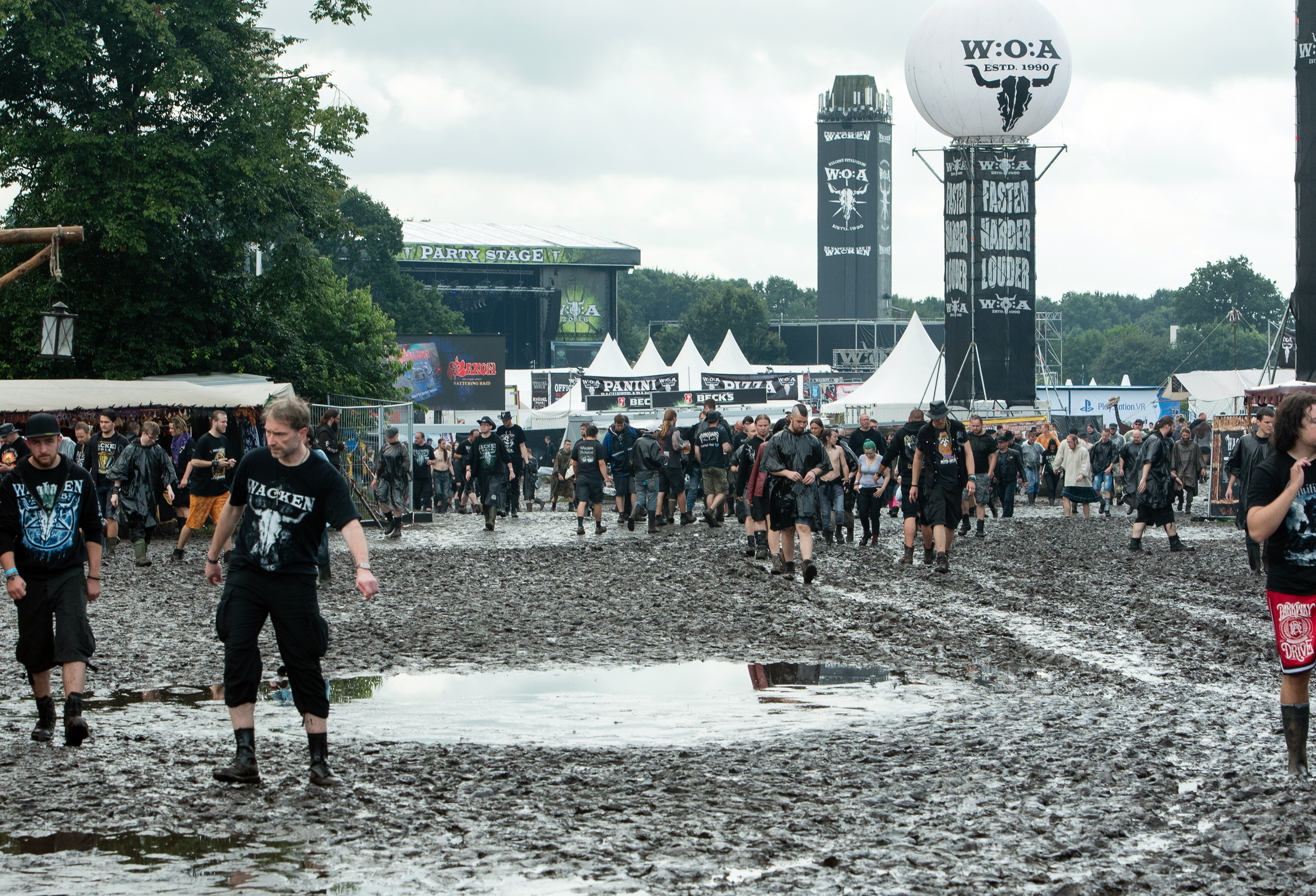
Wacken Open Air 2016

Prices for the festival have risen and are currently at a level similar to other major Rock festivals, such as Rock am Ring and Hurricane Festival. After several years of success in which the festival sold out within hours, the first 60,000 tickets for the 2017 festival were sold in mid-2016. 55,000 tickets were sold within the first hour. By the end of April 2017, the festival was almost sold out except for a few remaining tickets. The price for the festival ticket was 220 Euros, but there was no fee for early arrival campers, who often set up their elaborately designed accommodations before the festival begins – partly to get the best spots near the festival grounds. In addition, all toilets and showers were free in 2017.

The festival sold out within a few days each in 2014–2016. However, the last tickets for the 2017 festival were sold after 309 days, a mere 2 months before the start of the festival, even though only 10,000 tickets remained after the first day of sales. This was a matter of speculation at first, and reasons such as the changed security situation or the price development were taken into account. Regardless of that, the festival sold out for the 13th time in a row in 2018.

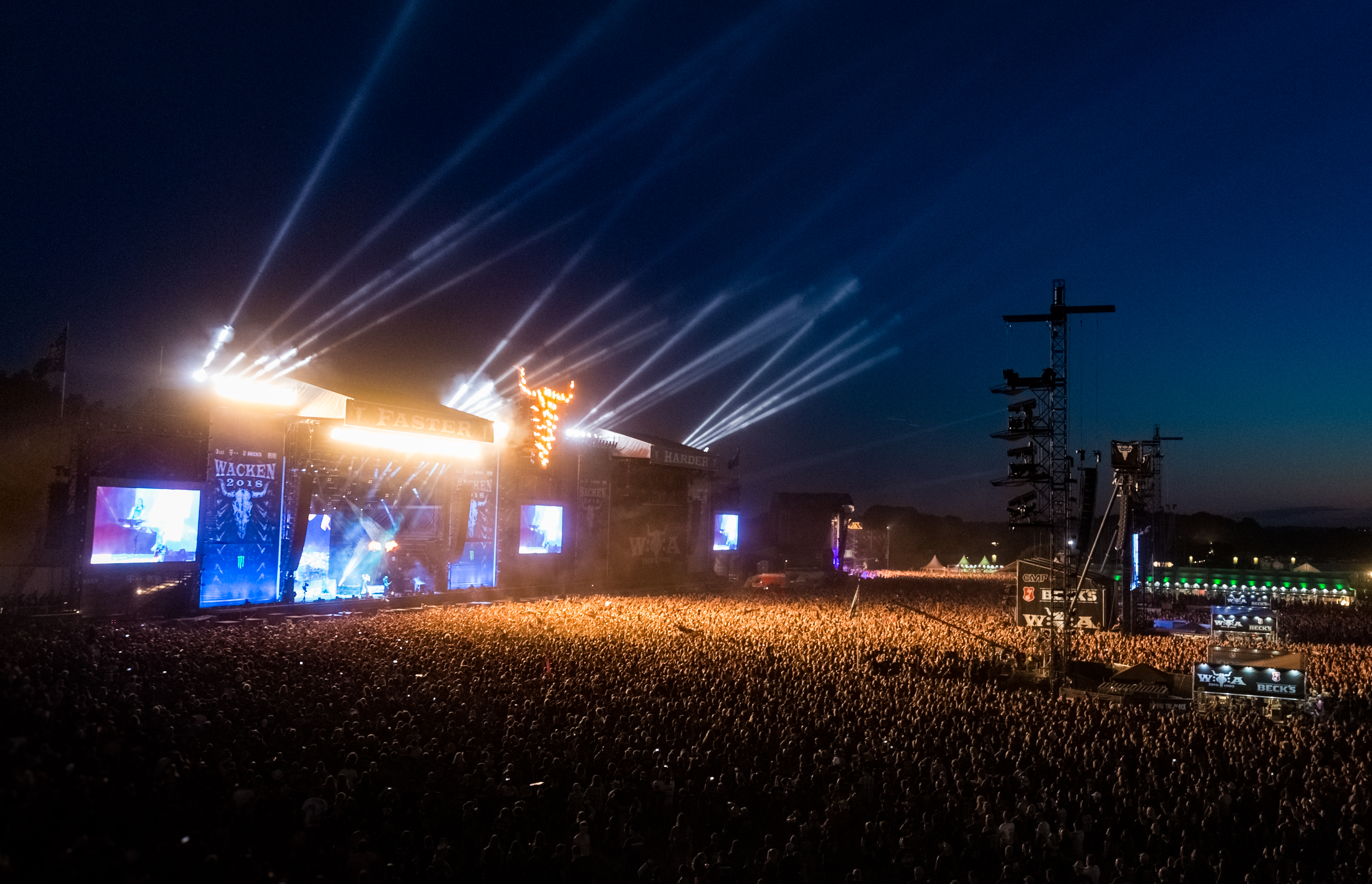
Nightwish at Wacken Open Air 2018

On 5 April 2018, Thomas Hess, the festival's production and former security director, died. He joined festival management in 1996 as a former tour manager of Böhse Onkelz and was a key figure in festival management alongside the remaining founders and the Trede family members, who organize the camping areas and supervisors as subcontractors. He contributed to the festival's management, operations, and structure.

For W:O:A 2019, all 75,000 tickets were sold within the first four days of sales, making this the 14th time in a row that the festival completely sold out.

=== Since the Covid pandemic ===
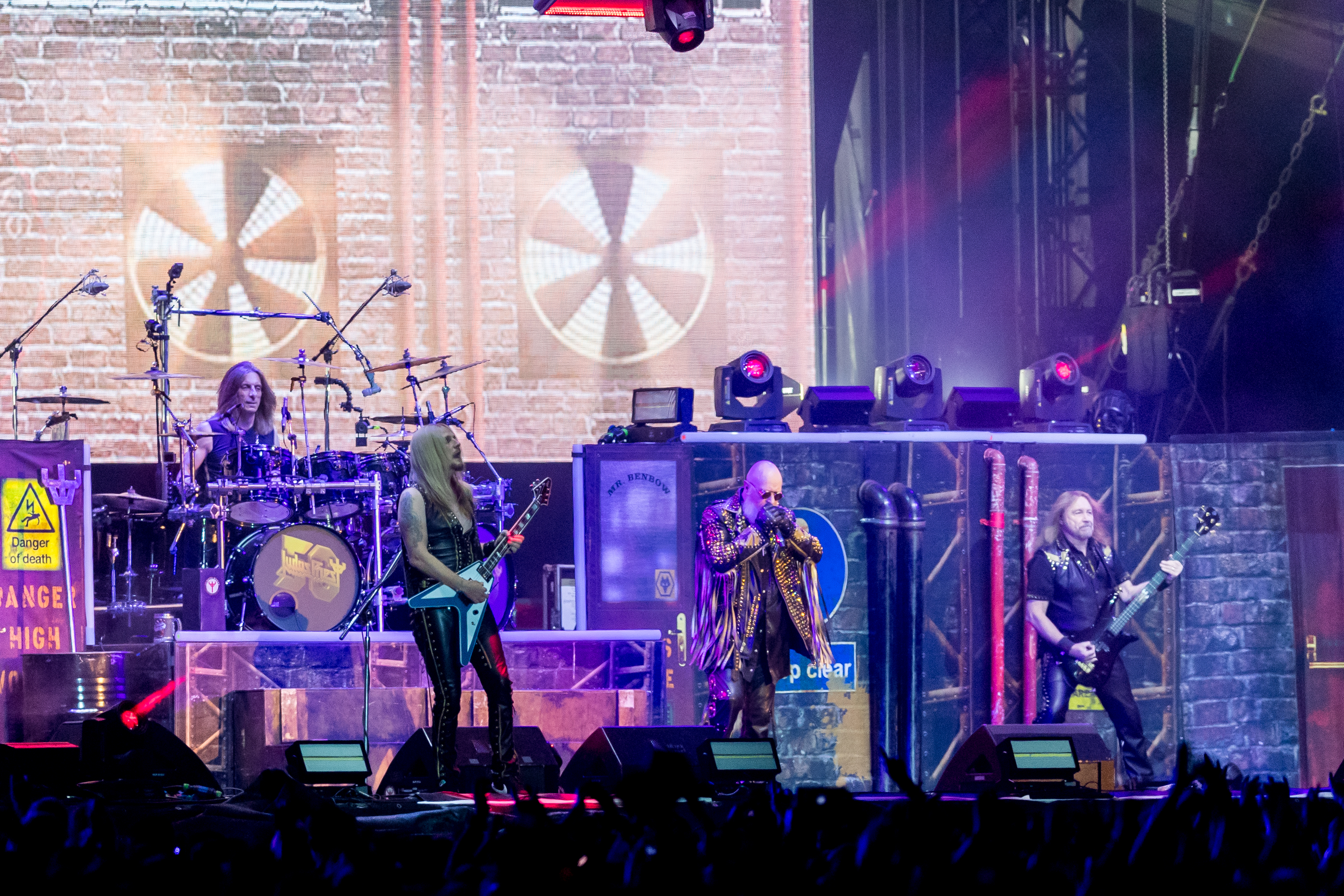
Judas Priest in 2022

On 16 April 2020, it was announced that the 2020 edition of the festival would be cancelled because of the ongoing COVID-19 pandemic. The organisers created an event for that year called, "Wacken Worldwide", featuring well-known bands performing on a mixed-reality stage, along with interviews and other interactive features. It was the biggest livestream event of 2020. The first set of bands were announced on 1 August 2020 for the rescheduled festival for 2021.

On 1 June 2021, the promoters of Wacken Open Air announced that the festival would not take place this year, again due to the ongoing COVID-19 pandemic, and was scheduled to return in the summer of 2022, with more information and details to be announced in September 2021.

2022 was the first edition that was able to take place since the COVID-19 pandemic. Headliners were Powerwolf, Slipknot and Judas Priest.

The 2023 festival sold out in a record time of 5 hours. Headliners were Iron Maiden, Heaven Shall Burn, Doro and Helloween. For the first time in the festival's history, they had to announce a ban of motorised vehicles due to heavy rainfall and storm alerts. This announcement came on Wednesday morning, the day before the festival was supposed to begin. The police estimated 50,000 festival goers were able to reach the festival by the time the ban was announced. The people who were not able to reach the festival were offered a refund.

The 2024 festival sold out, once again in a record time of 4.9 hours. Bands included Amon Amarth, KoЯn, Scorpions and Blind Guardian.

== Overview by year ==
The following chart shows the development of prices and visitor numbers of past festivals as published by the organisers. Prices refer to the total amount per ticket (incl. parking and camping) in pre-sale (without additional fees). The price for the 4-day 2023 edition (299.00 EUR) has been adjusted accordingly.

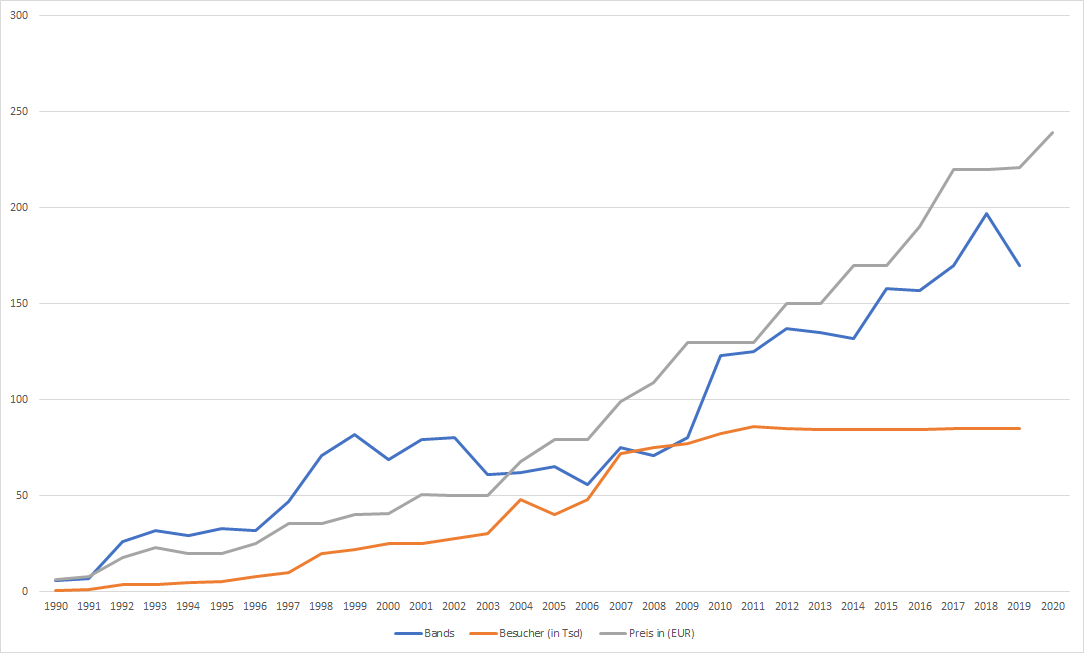

Year	Bands	Headliners	Attendees	Paying attendees	Price (EUR)	Sold out
1990	6		800	N/A	6.14	
1991	7		1,300	N/A	7.67	
1992	26	Saxon, Blind Guardian	3,500	N/A	17.90	
1993	32	Doro, Fates Warning	3,500	N/A	23.01	
1994	29	Paul Di'Anno's Killers, Skyclad, Gamma Ray	4,500	N/A	19.94	
1995	33	D:A:D, Tiamat, Pretty Maids, Morgoth	5,000	N/A	20.05	
1996	32	Böhse Onkelz, Kreator, The Exploited	8,000	N/A	25.05	
1997	47	Motörhead, Rage, Sodom, Tank, Overkill	10,000	N/A	35.28	
1998	71	Savatage, Blind Guardian, Iced Earth, JBO	20,000	N/A	35.28	
1999	82	(10th anniversary)	22,000	N/A	40.39	
2000	69	Thin Lizzy (Sykes & Gorham), Venom, Iced Earth, Stratovarius	25,000	N/A	40.90	
2001	79	Saxon, Motörhead, W.A.S.P., HammerFall, Dimmu Borgir, Helloween	25,000	N/A	50.62	
2002	80	Blind Guardian, Bruce Dickinson	27,500	N/A	50.00	
2003	61	Slayer, Twisted Sister, Running Wild, Stratovarius	30,000	N/A	50.00	
2004	62	Saxon, Warlock, Böhse Onkelz, Karmicon, Helloween, Motörhead, Doro	48,000	N/A	68.00	
2005	65	Accept, Nightwish, Machine Head, Kreator, Apocalyptica	40,000	N/A	79.00	
2006	56	Motörhead, Whitesnake, Scorpions, Ministry	48,000	N/A	79.00	
2007	75	Blind Guardian, Iced Earth, In Flames, Immortal, Saxon, Type O Negative	72,000	60,000	99.00	339 days
2008	71	Iron Maiden, Avantasia, Nightwish, At the Gates, Children of Bodom, Gorgoroth (Gaahl & King)	75,000	N/A	109.00	221 days
2009	80	Heaven & Hell, Motörhead, Saxon, Machine Head, In Flames, Running Wild	77,000	N/A	130.00	149 days
2010	123	Iron Maiden, Mötley Crüe, Slayer, Alice Cooper, Grave Digger, Immortal	82,500	75,000	130.00	247 days
2011	125	Ozzy Osbourne, Judas Priest, Motörhead, Blind Guardian, Avantasia, Airbourne	85.870	75,000	130,00	187 days
2012	137	Machine Head, Scorpions, Volbeat, Ministry, Dimmu Borgir, In Flames	85,000	75,000	150.00	121 days
2013	135	Rammstein, Motörhead, Deep Purple, Nightwish, Alice Cooper, Doro	84,500	75,000	150.00	47 days
2014	132	Slayer, Megadeth, Accept, King Diamond, Motörhead, Avantasia	84,500	75,000	170.00	43 hours
2015	158	Judas Priest, Rob Zombie, Savatage, Running Wild, Trans-Siberian Orchestra, Sabaton	84.500	75,000	170.00	12 hours
2016	157	Iron Maiden, Whitesnake, Blind Guardian, Twisted Sister, Testament, Ministry	84,500	75,000	190.00	23 hours
2017	170	Megadeth, Volbeat, Accept, Alice Cooper, Amon Amarth, Marilyn Manson	85,000	75,000	220.00	309 days
2018	197	Judas Priest, Nightwish, In Flames, Helloween, Ghost, Danzig	85,000	75,000	220.00	346 days
2019	200	Sabaton, Demons & Wizards, Slayer, Powerwolf, Parkway Drive		75,000	221.00	4 days
2020	Called off due to the COVID-19 pandemic					
2021	Called off due to the COVID-19 pandemic					
2022	195	Judas Priest, Slipknot, Powerwolf, Mercyful Fate, In Extremo, Arch Enemy	103,000	83,400	239.00	21 hours
2023	230	Iron Maiden, Heaven Shall Burn, Helloween, Doro, Kreator, Megadeth, Wardruna	42,000	85,000	299.00	5 hours
2024		Scorpions, Korn, Amon Amarth, Avantasia, Blind Guardian, Gene Simmons, Architects	60,000	85,000	333.00	4,5 hours
2025		Guns 'N' Roses, Machine Head, Saltatio Mortis, Gojira, Dimmu Borgir, Papa Roach	68,000	85,000	333.00	57 days
2026	239	Sabaton, Powerwolf, Def Leppard, Arch Enemy, Judas Priest, In Flames, Savatage	...	...	351.00	352 days

== Organisation ==
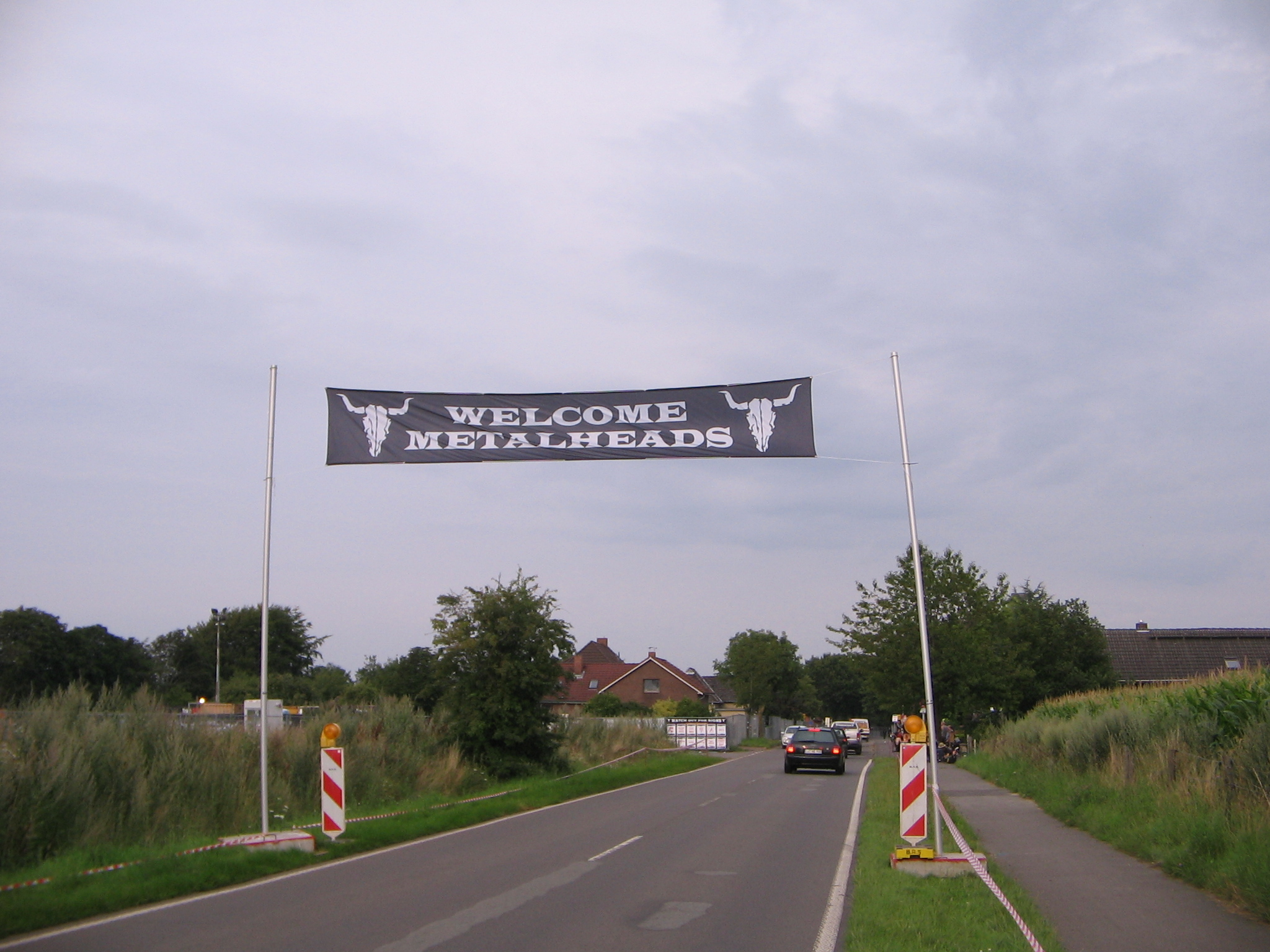
A banner welcoming metalheads to Wacken, 2009

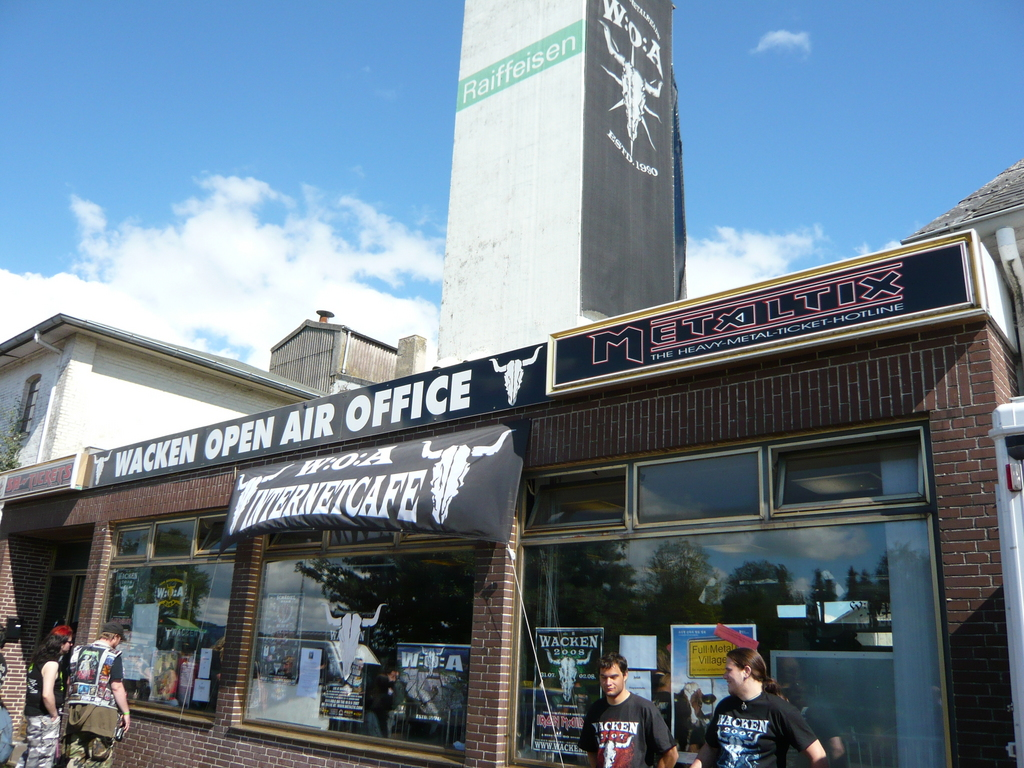
The Wacken Office in 2007

The organisers of Wacken Open Air founded Stone Castle Rockpromotions in 1990 for the first festival. The name is derived from the direct translation of "Steinburg" from the district of Steinburg, to which Wacken belongs. Stone Castle remained the company's name until 1996. Up until 2014, the headquarters were located in Dörpstedt (Schleswig-Flensburg district) and then moved to Wacken. The company's name has been ICS (International Concert Service) GmbH since 1999. The company owns the label Wacken Records and the mailorder Metaltix, among others.

A daily festival newspaper has been available since 2007, reporting on what's happening on the festival grounds. The Thursday edition is also included free of charge with all newspapers published by Schleswig-Holsteinischer Zeitungsverlag.

In 2014, the online radio station RauteMusik took over production of the official Wacken radio. Wacken Radio has its own container on the festival grounds every year, where it reports live.

Up until a few years ago, Wacken's official town signs were either replaced by plastic signs spelling Heavy Metal Town during W:O:A or bolted more tightly because they were often stolen as souvenirs. Some shops are now selling black cotton bags with the Wacken town sign on one side and the words "This town sign I may keep" on the other.

An action for exceeding the maximum noise limit, brought before the Administrative Court of Schleswig by residents of Wacken, ended in January 2013 with an out-of-court settlement. Now, if the average noise level of the festival exceeds 70 dB, the organisers pay 1,000 Euros to the community, which donates the money to charitable causes.

In July 2022, it was announced that starting with W:O:A 2023 and onwards, the festival will be extended from three to four days and that the Wednesday will be the new first full day. Up until 2022, while there was plenty of programme on Wednesdays, it was more of an unofficial afternoon introduction to the festival and Thursdays remained the official opening day.

=== Infrastructure ===
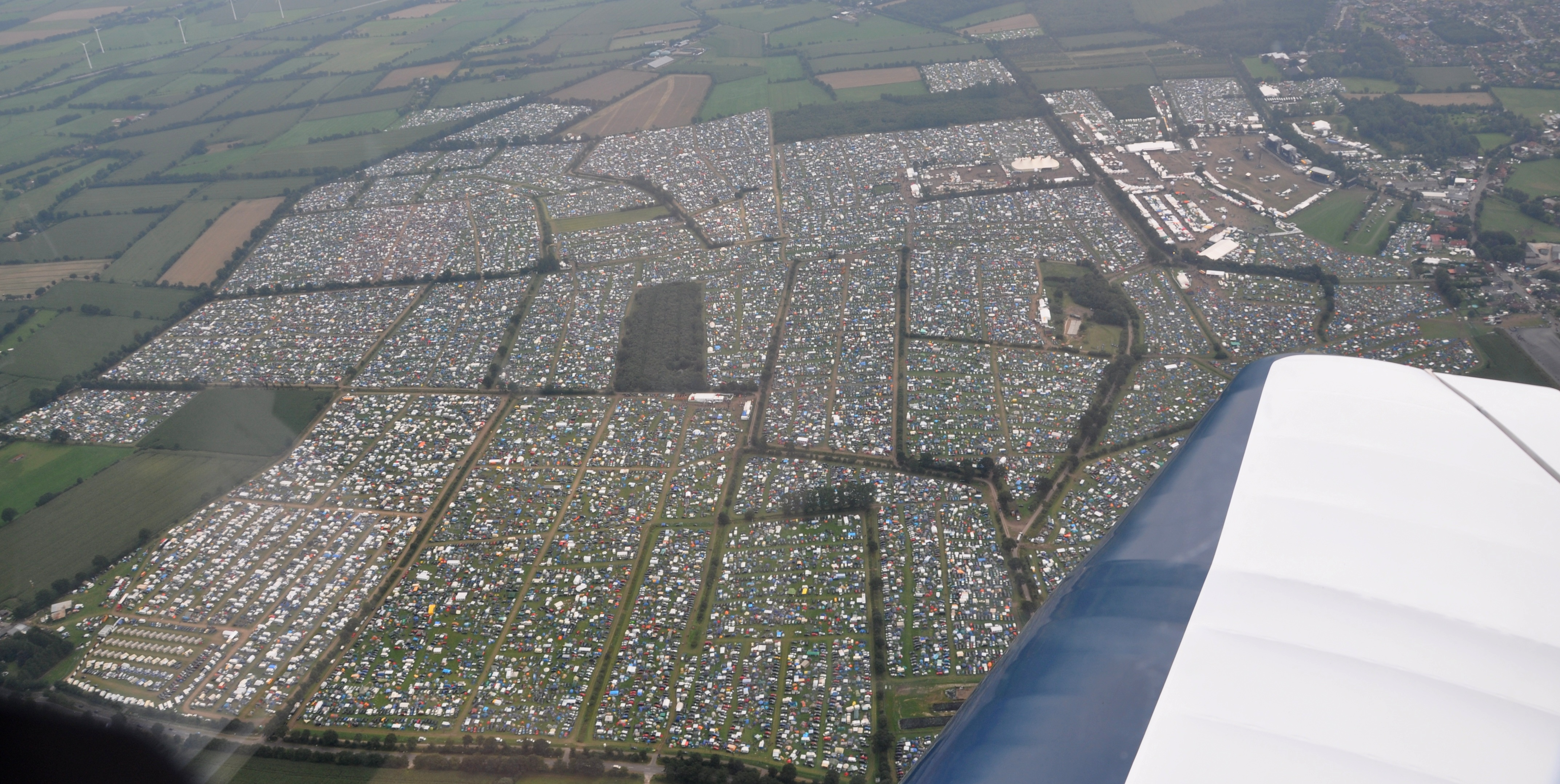
Aerial view of Wacken Open Air, 2011

The site covers more than 240 hectares, which are divided by more than 45 kilometres of fence. The inner area, including the main stage, has a size of 43,000 square metres. More than 1,300 toilets and almost 500 showers are available for the 75,000 attendees. 2,200 trucks with equipment are needed for the festival. Stage construction and dismantling usually take 7 days and 5 days respectively. For this, 75 trucks of stage equipment (1,000 tonnes), 10 trucks of sound equipment and 27 trucks of lighting equipment are used.

Since 2014, the electric output has amounted to 12 megawatts, roughly matching the needs of a small town counting 70,000 inhabitants. In addition, 40 diesel-fuelled emergency power generators are required. 25 electricians are responsible for the power supply.

600,000 Euros were spent on the construction of sewage systems and the improvement of power supply on the festival grounds. At the same time, 700,000 Euros worth of drains were installed in front of the stages in order to improve the drainage of water masses during heavy rains. The main paths were also paved with 10 km of mobile roads to facilitate access for rescue vehicles.

A total of approximately 5,000 employees work for the festival, including 1,800 security staff members, 150 cleaners, 70 construction and dismantling assistants, as well as 400 police officers, 250 firefighters, 900 paramedics and six emergency doctors.

In 2017, a beer pipeline measuring one kilometre to supply ten dispensing systems was used for the first time. At full capacity, this construction allowed for 10,000 litres of beer to be tapped within the hour.

=== Stages ===
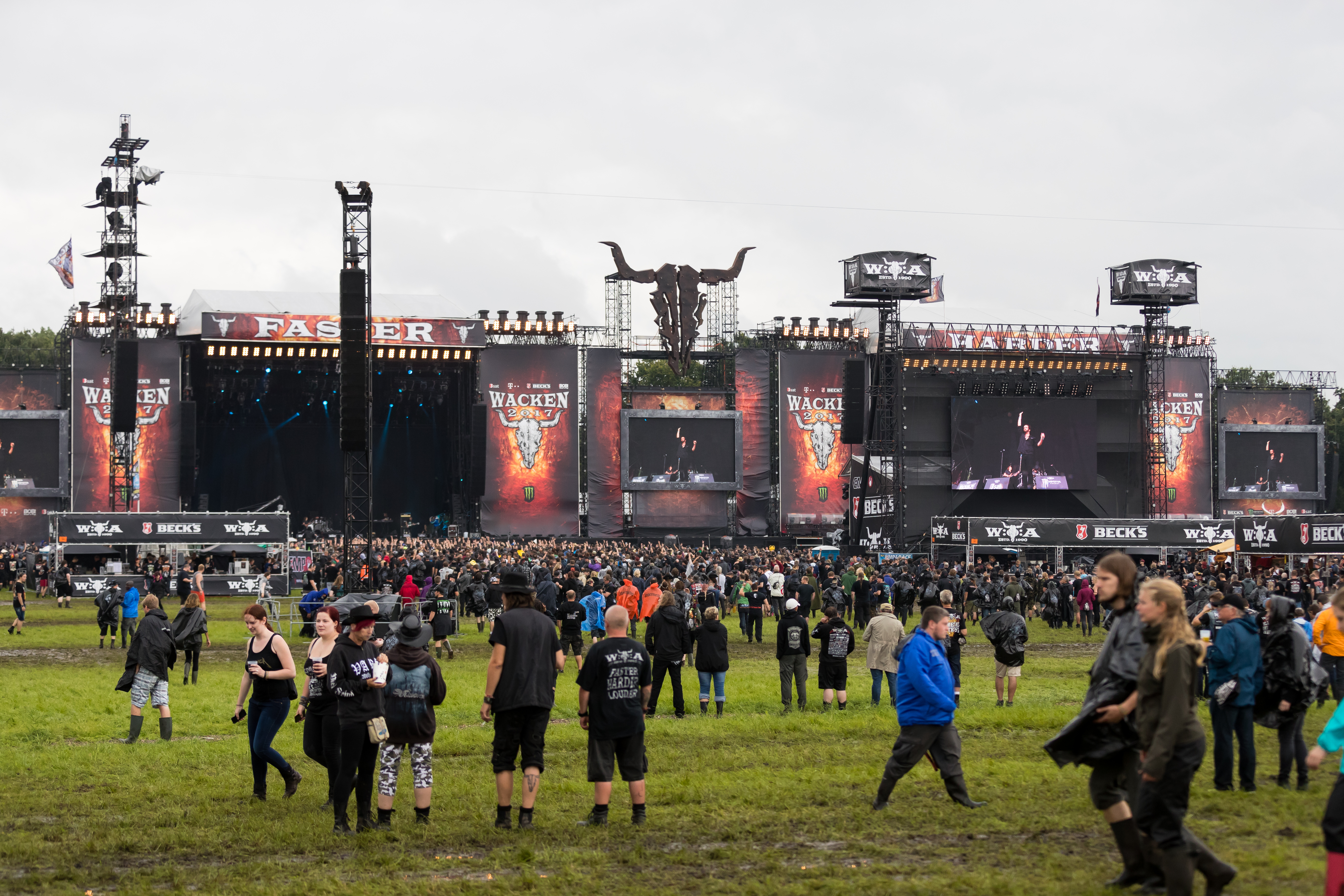
Faster and Harder Stages at Wacken Open Air 2017

Wacken Open Air has eight stages for musicians and accompanying entertainment. The most important ones are the Faster and the Harder Stage, which are designed as connected twin stages and have a shared sound and lighting system. Together with the slightly smaller Louder Stage, these two stages make up the Infield, or The Holy Ground. All three stages are also equipped with video walls to allow visibility of the performers even from remote positions.

Up until 2016, these three stages were called Black Stage, True Metal Stage, and Party Stage. After Wacken 2016, visitors were encouraged to suggest new names. From these suggestions, the best ideas were to be put up to a vote in a survey. Instead, however, the slogan "Faster - Harder - Louder" became the inspiration for the names and the three stages were renamed accordingly.

Two more twin stages, the W.E.T. Stage (Wacken Evolution Tent) and the Headbanger Stage, are located inside a big tent called Bullhead City Circus. The Metal Battle takes place on these stages on Wednesday and Thursday, followed by regular band appearances on the days after.

While the large stages and tent stages are open to all genres, the remaining stages are dedicated to specific themes. The Wackinger Stage is located in the medieval area of the festival and is played primarily by bands from Folk, Pagan and Medieval genres, while the Wasteland Stage, which was established in 2014, is geared towards music with an apocalyptic touch. The Beergarden Stage is modelled after typical folk festival stages, but also accommodates permanent Wacken guests such as the Wacken Firefighters and Mambo Kurt.

=== Event area ===
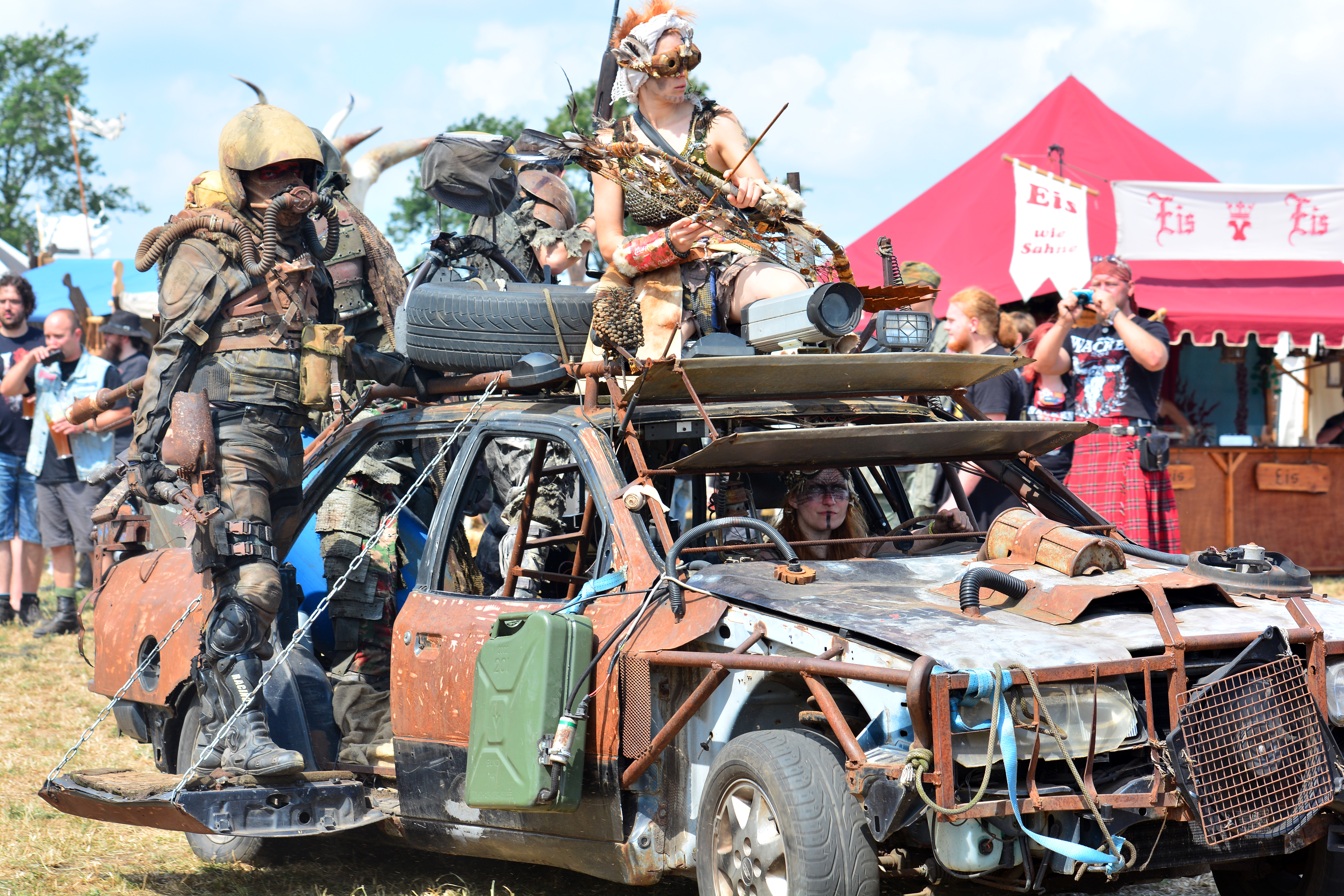
Wasteland – apocalypse at Wacken Open Air 2014

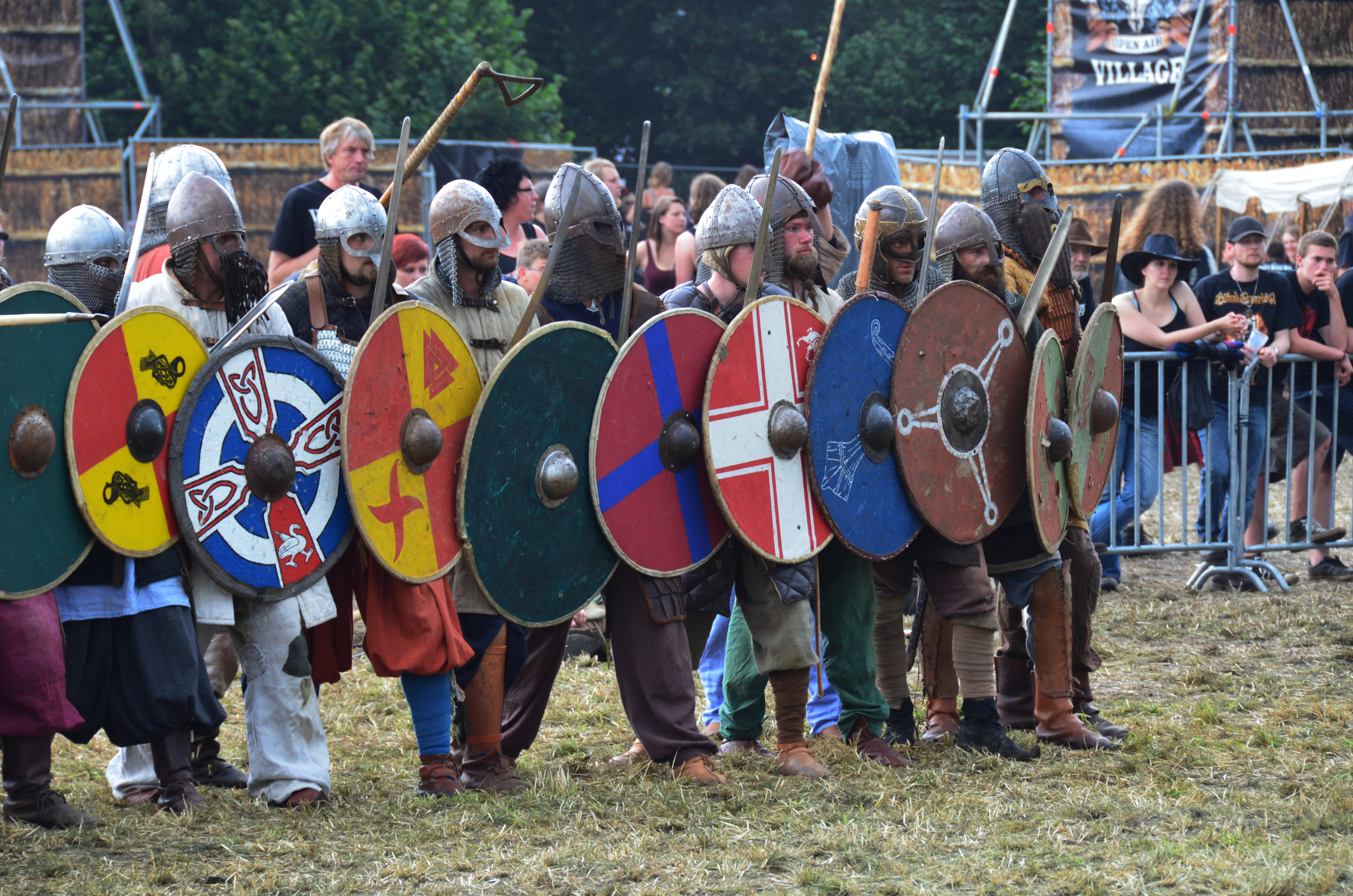
Viking re-enactors at Wackinger village, 2012

Wacken Open Air's event area is divided into several structurally separated sections. Since 2014, only one major security check is performed upon entering the grounds, after that, only the festival wristbands are checked.

Special features of the W:O:A include the Wackinger area, which resembles a medieval market and contains specialty food and beverage stalls as well as the Wackinger Stage, where matching music is played. Various walking acts also entertain the audience. This area borders on the Wasteland designed by the Wasteland Warriors, where a post-apocalyptic world and stage (Wastelandstage) styled in homage to the Mad Max franchise is set up.

The area in front of the main stages comprises both the Bavarian beer garden and a large shopping mile called Metal Markt. There are also various food stalls, the Wacken Foundation Camp, ATMs, and the Movie Field, where Heavy Metal documentaries and feature films are screened.

The most important stages, the focal point of the festival, are located in the so-called Infield, which can be reached only via the Centre. In addition to these stages, it also has food and beverage stalls.

=== Camping grounds ===
As Wacken Open Air only sells 3-day tickets, the majority of visitors spend the entire festival on-site. As a result, most of the more than 240 hectares of the festival site are designated camping areas. Camping opens on Monday and has been included in the ticket price since 2017. However, in the years before, an extra fee was charged for arrival before Wednesday.

The campsite is equipped with showers, flushing toilets, portable toilets, drinking fountains, small supermarkets, food stalls and information board It is continuously patrolled by the police, fire brigade and security services. A refuse collection service collects refuse bags on the premises.

Since the large crowds lead to a bottleneck on mobile service, some providers now set up portable base stations for GSM, UMTS, and LTE+ during the festival.

=== Medical services ===
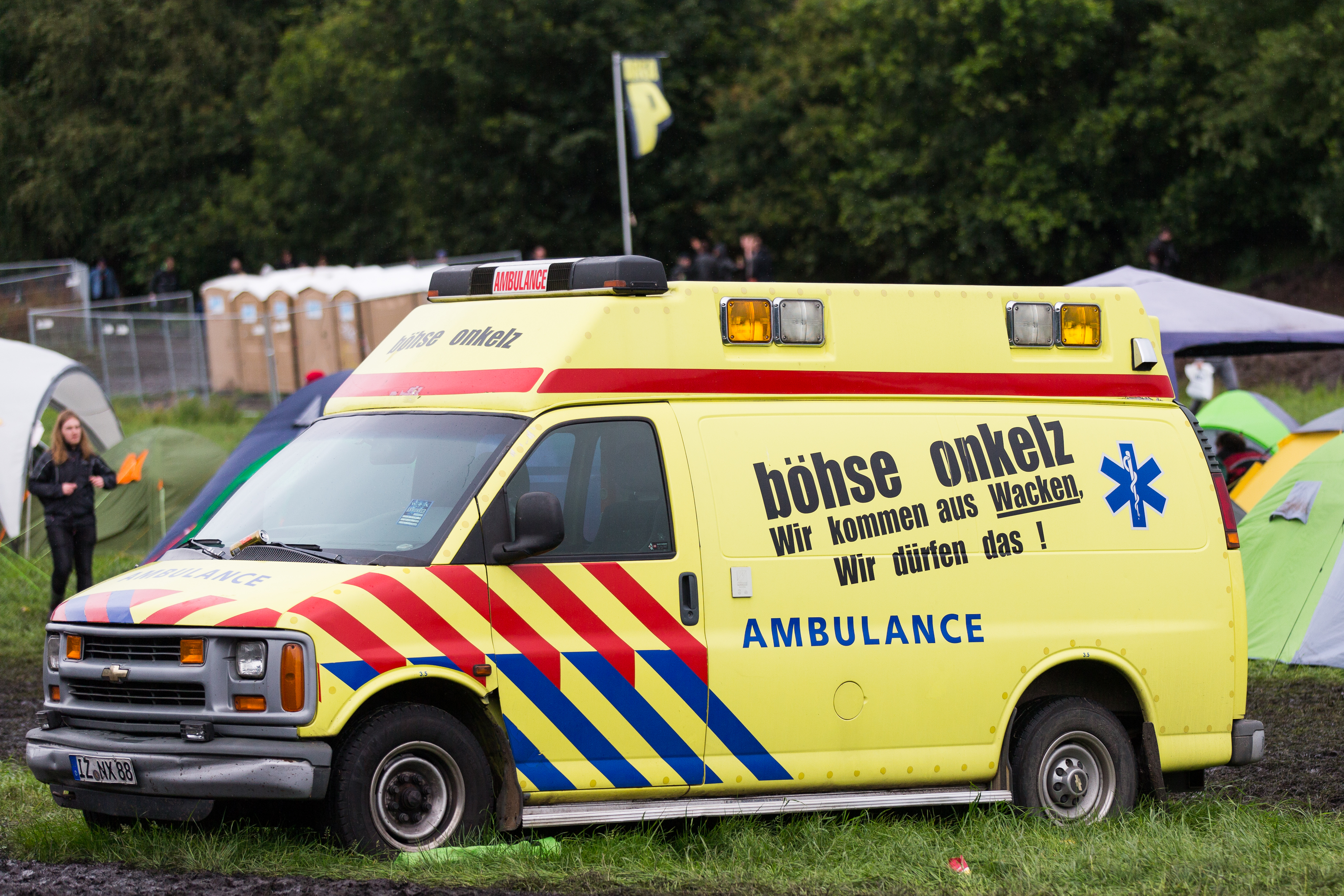
A Wacken ambulance, 2015

A festival of this size needs capable medical services, which here are called the Wacken Rescue Squad. Every year, hundreds of helpers from various relief organisations from all over Germany arrive before the festival to prepare the medical camp and care for people in need during the event. The medical service is managed by the local DRK association in Kaltenkirchen.

The visiting and local relief organisations provide vehicles and material during the course of the festival. These include ambulances and radios for communication in particular. Due to the road conditions, quads and foot patrols are often used in Wacken, especially in the vicinity of the medical centre. In addition to the medical service, which counts approx. 270 people at peak times, the rescue service cooperation Schleswig-Holstein has more than ten emergency vehicles (ambulances and mobile intensive care units) on site while coordinating the overall emergency management.

In 2013, around 3,300 people received medical care from approximately 500 medics.

=== Crime and accidents ===
Despite the size of the festival, no serious security problems have been encountered so far. Disputes among visitors are rare, and in 2011, a total of 20 reports of bodily injury was filed. The main problem consists of several hundred reported thefts each year. In 2011, police were able to arrest three gangs of thieves. In comparison to other events of this scale, the festival is classified by police as secure.

So far there have been four deaths and some serious injuries:

- In 2005, a heavily intoxicated 37-year-old crashed into an ambulance moving at walking pace and succumbed to his head injuries in the hospital. To support his family, organisers held a fundraising event; W:O:A 2006 honoured the deceased with a minute's silence.
- In 2011, a rioting fan was overwhelmed by security guards in the village and died of cardiovascular arrest.
- In 2012, a 22-year-old festival visitor went to sleep near a generator and breathed in its carbon monoxide fumes. He could not be revived.
- In 2013, a 52-year-old visitor from Poland died of natural causes in his tent. That same year, a fan was seriously injured when the cartridge of his camping stove exploded for unknown reasons.
- In 2016, two men were injured when one of them set fire to illegal firecrackers and the other tried to stop him.
- In 2017, a 16-year-old was seriously injured while trying to refill a camping stove with denatured alcohol.

== Commitment ==
=== Metal Battle ===
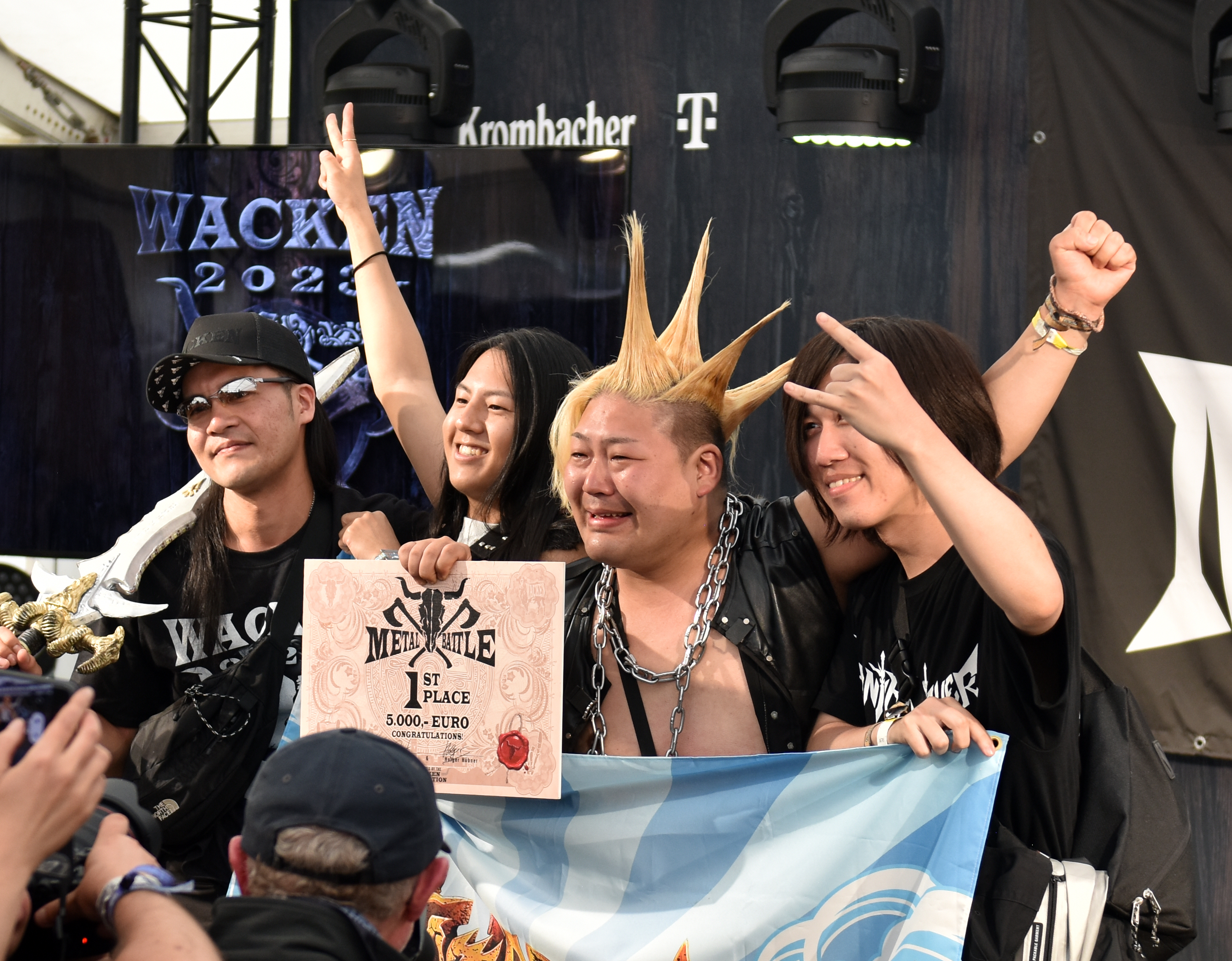
The 2023 winners of Metal Battle, Japanese band Phantom Excaliver

W:O:A Metal Battle is an international band contest first held in 2004. During Metal Battle, newcomer bands compete against each other in national qualifiers and finals; the winner of each country then competes against the other finalists in the grand finale at Wacken Open Air.

An international jury selects the competition's best bands. In earlier years, winners of the competition were offered a record deal, whereas nowadays, the five best bands receive cash or material prizes.

=== Wacken Foundation ===
The Wacken Foundation was founded in 2009 by the festival's organisers and serves as a charitable foundation. Its objective is to support young bands from the Heavy Metal genre.

Sponsorship is granted to specific projects such as the production of a CD or the realisation of a tour. In addition, the Wacken Foundation provides information about its projects at many European festivals each summer. Since the 2017/2018 season, the Wacken Foundation's lettering can be found on the jerseys of German 3rd league club FC Carl Zeiss Jena. This was facilitated by jersey sponsors Heaven Shall Burn, whose logo has been moved to the jersey's sleeve for this cause. Part of the proceeds from the jersey's sale is donated to the foundation.

=== Wacken Music Camp ===
2014 saw Wacken Music Camp take place for the first time. One week after the festival ended, young people from all over Germany were invited to write and play their own songs under the guidance of professional musicians. They were accommodated in the so-called Kuhle, the site of the first Wacken Open Air.

=== Blood donations ===
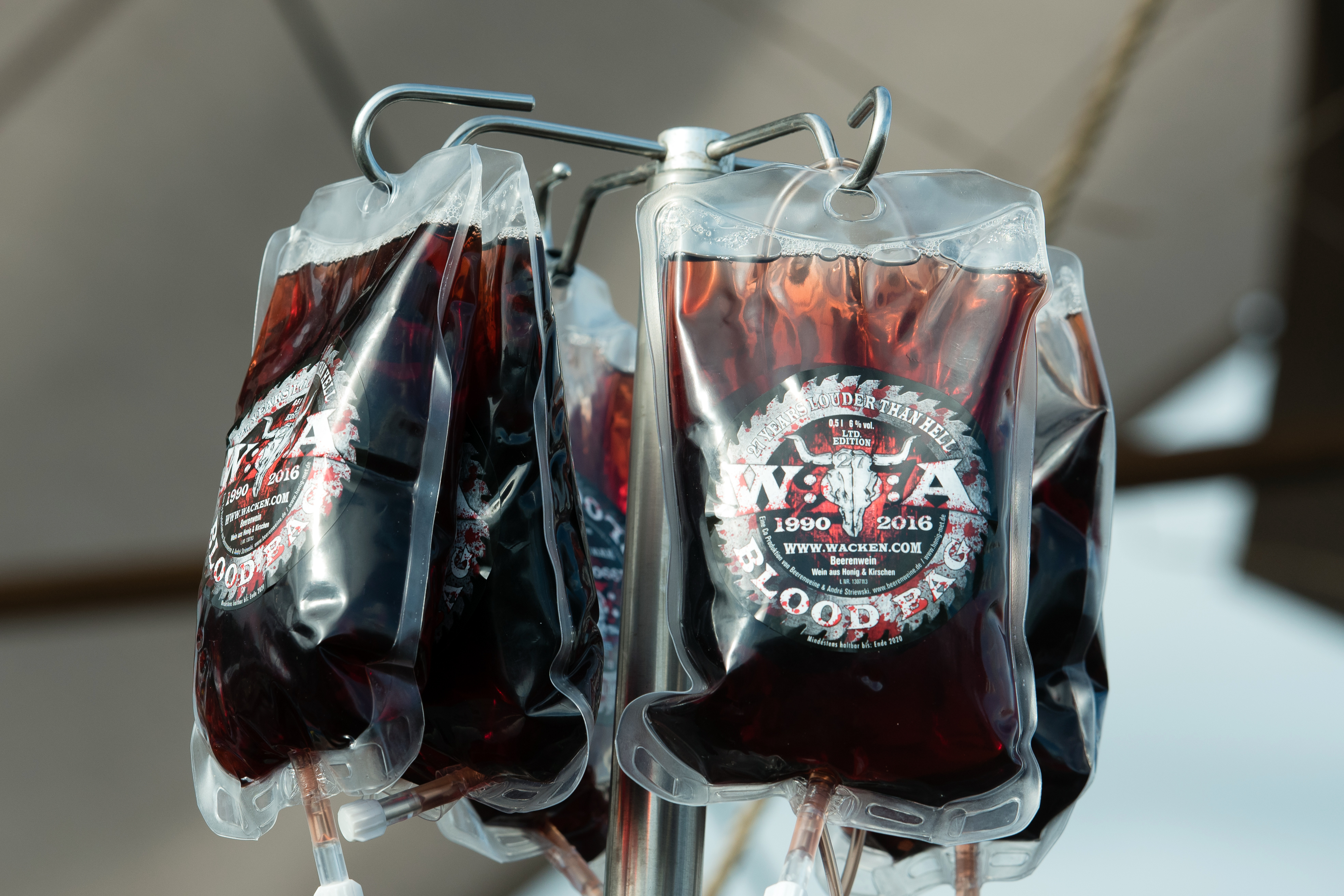
Wacken blood bags, 2016

The organisers regularly call for blood donations with the whole festival team. Blood is donated at the Itzehoe Clinic and the entire wing is decorated in W:O:A style, while Heavy Metal is blasted through the speakers.

=== DKMS typing campaign ===
Since W:O:A 2014, visitors and musicians have been encouraged to have their bone marrow typed for donation by the German Bone Marrow Donor Database. In 2014, 2,700 visitors took this opportunity.

=== Stark gegen Krebs – Strong against cancer ===
The festival works with the organisers of the so-called Wattolümpiade ("mudflat Olympics") in Brunsbüttel to promote the slogan Stark gegen Krebs ("Strong against cancer"). The festival's team helps out with logistics for the event.

== Related events ==
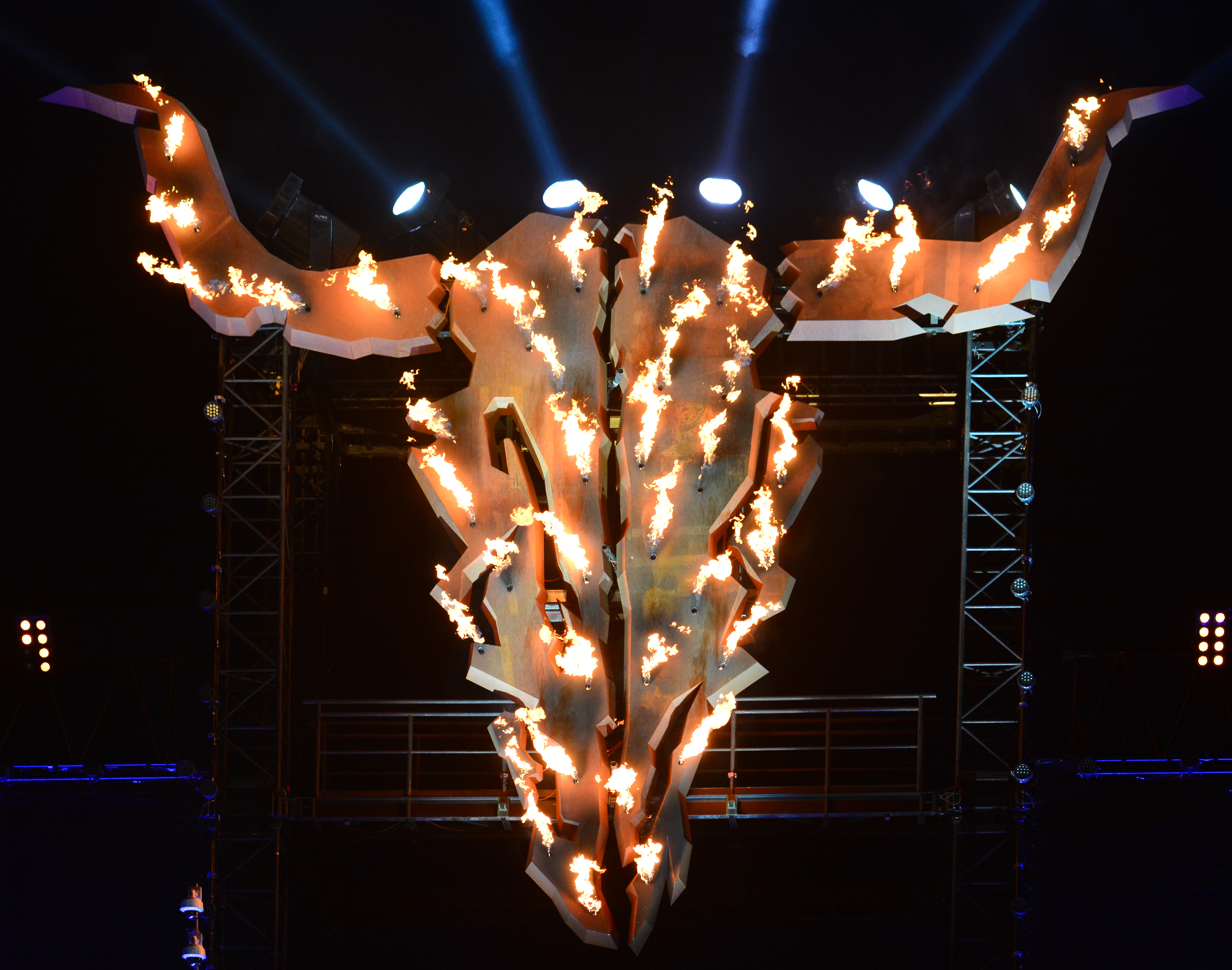
The skull symbol of Wacken and related events named after it

In addition to the festival itself, there are numerous other events planned and carried out by the organisers.

=== Hamburg Metal Dayz ===
The indoor festival Hamburg Metal Dayz takes place at the same time as the Reeperbahn-Festival and is considered a get-together for the scene. In addition to concerts, there are panels with musicians, managers, and other Metal experts, as well as workshops and a question and answer session with the W:O:A organisers.

=== Wacken Roadshow ===
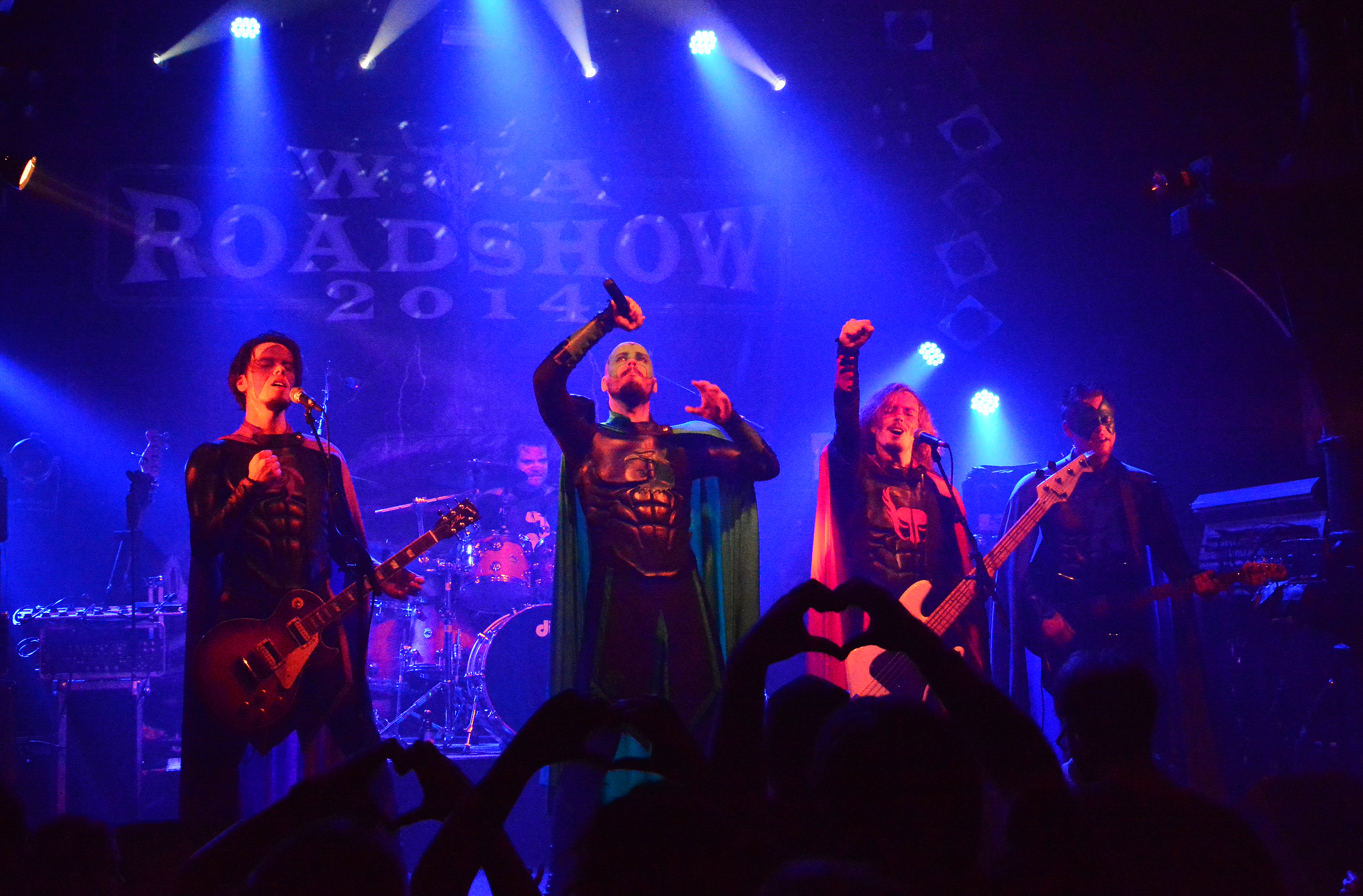
Grailknights at Wacken Roadshow 2014

For the Wacken Roadshow, several bands tour Europe under the banner of Wacken Open Air. These concerts are meant to complement the warm-up parties organised in many places.

=== Wacken Rocks ===
Several open-air festivals called Wacken Rocks were held in the past to transport the Wacken atmosphere to other places.

=== Wacken Winter Nights ===
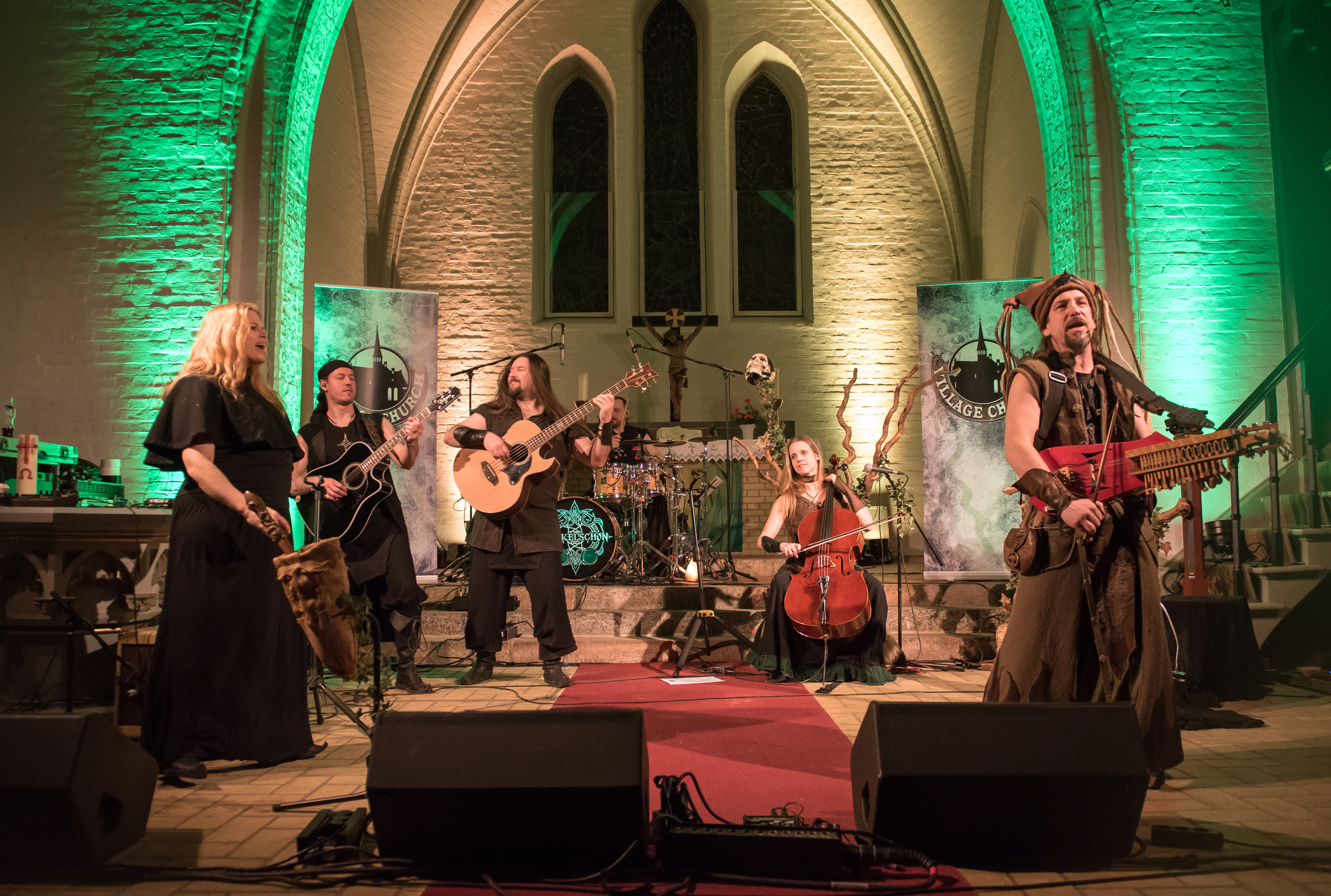
Dunkelschön at Metal Church during Wacken Winter Nights in 2017

Wacken Winter Nights (WWN), a three-day Folk and Medieval open-air festival, took place for the first time in February 2017 at temperatures of -2 to -6 degrees Celsius in Wacken. With over 3,500 attendees, the festival's first edition sold out several weeks in advance. Most of them spent the nights on the camping site. A second edition took place from 23 to 25 February 2018. Due to the construction on the previous year's campground, the overnight accommodations were relocated to the area that is also used for the regular Open Air. The walking distance, therefore, increased to about 15 minutes. With 4,000 visitors, the 2018 event also sold out. For the third event in 2019, the festival grounds were expanded considerably and 5,000 visitors attended. The fourth WWNs are planned for the 14th to 16 February 2020.

Year	Bands	Paying attendees	Price (EUR)	Sold out
2017		3,500	69.00	yes
2018	35	4,000		yes
2019	34	5,000	89.99	

=== Zum Wackinger ===
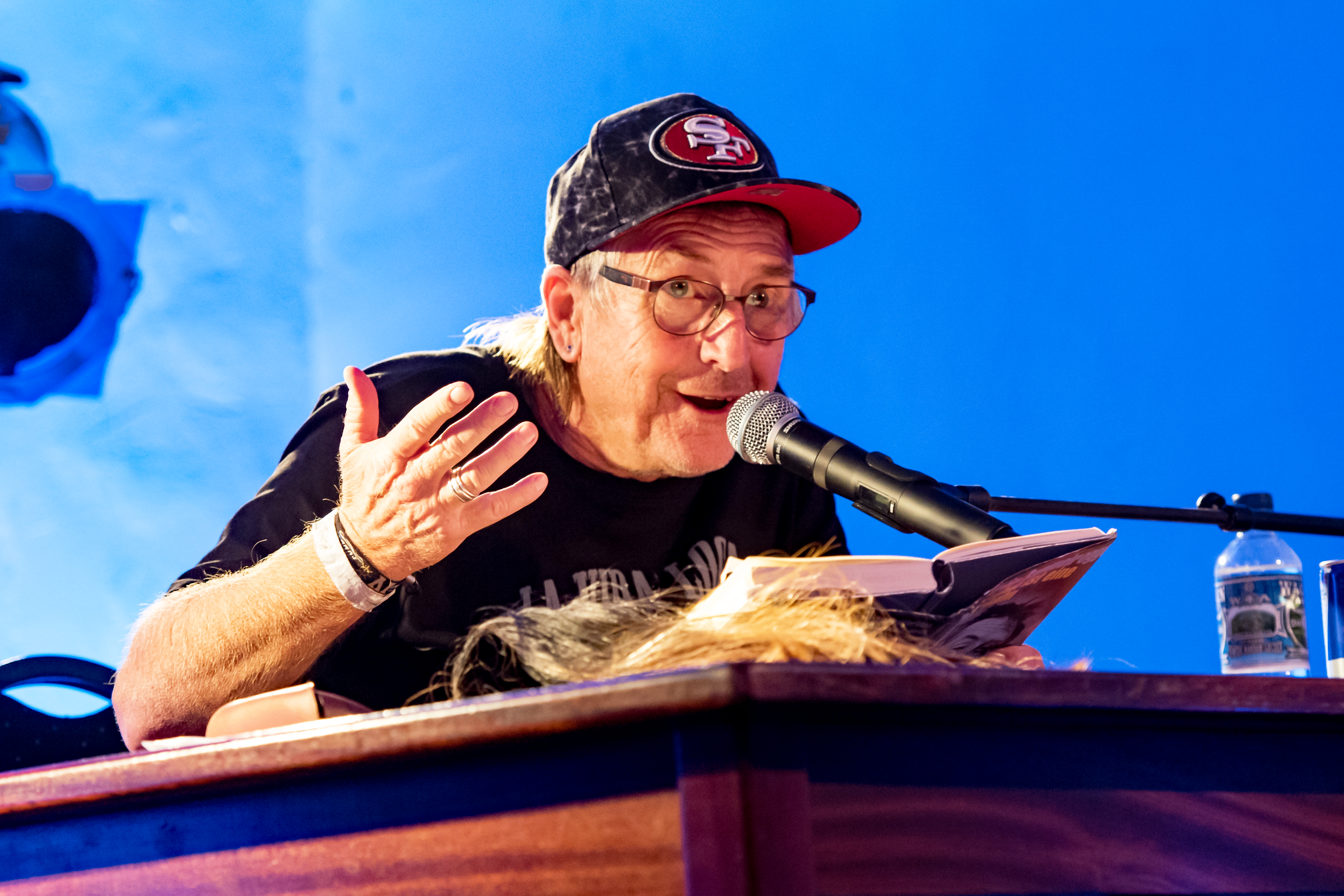
Reading with Martin Semmelrogge at Zum Wackinger 2017

The former country-style restaurant Zur Post in Wacken, built in 1919, has been the hub of the village and the surrounding communities for decades. It was here that bartenders Thomas Jensen and Holger Hübner conceived the idea for today's Wacken Open Air. Today, it is used to accommodate staff and to serve other business purposes. A series of events called "Zum Wackinger" sees artists from music, comedy, and entertainment perform regularly. Since 2016, a two-day medieval feast with jugglers and bards takes place here.

=== Metal Monday ===
In the summer of 1990, Metal Monday took place for the first time at Knust in Hamburg. For five years, regional, national and international Metal bands like De la Cruz, 5th Avenue, and King Køng played at Knust every Monday. After a break of almost 20 years, Metal Monday was revived by the Wacken Open Air organisers in 2014 in cooperation with the Knust, Seaside Touring, All Access, and Hamburg Konzerte. Metal, Rock, and Folkrock bands now perform once a month, following the motto "three bands - small entrance fee". In addition to regional bands, international newcomers are always invited.

=== Metal Church ===
The Evangelical Lutheran Village Church in Wacken belongs to the Lutheran congregation of the Evangelical Lutheran Church in Northern Germany. For Wacken Open Air and Wacken Winter Nights, it is turned into the Metal Church. During said festivals, the Metal Service is held here and bands from the Folk and Medieval scene perform in the church.

=== Full Metal Mountain ===
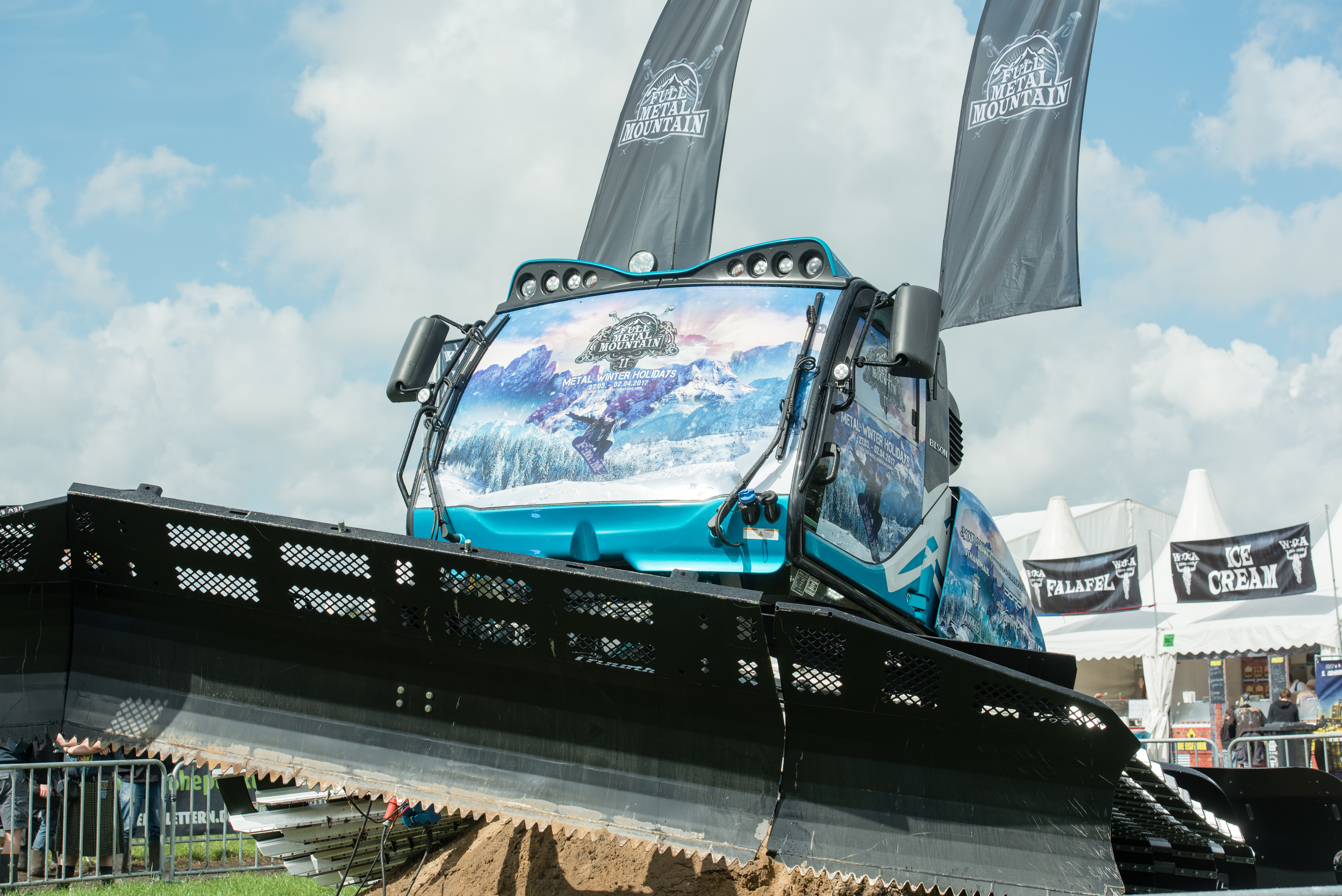
Snowcat used as an advertising medium for Full Metal Mountain 2017

During the winters of 2016, 2017 and 2018, an annual ski trip to Nassfeld, Austria was organised for Metal fans under the name Full Metal Mountain. Numerous bands and artists were present. For 2019, the festival was cancelled entirely.

=== Full Metal Holiday ===
Planning and preparation are underway for a holiday trip to Mallorca with the title Full Metal Holiday - Destination Mallorca, which will offer Metal concerts on the beach from 12 to 19 October 2020. The event was originally planned for 2017 and said to head to Ibiza, then rescheduled for 2018 and changed to Mallorca.

=== Full Metal Cruise ===
Cruises with Heavy Metal bands on board under the name Full Metal Cruise have been organised within Europe since 2013.

=== StrongmanRun ===
The Fisherman's Friend StrongmanRun visited the Metal festival grounds of Wacken for the first time in April 2016. With their Wacken debut, the StrongmanRun season formally kicked off. About 3,000 participants, some in colourful costumes, took part in the run on the 20 km track with 40 obstacles. In 2017, the StrongmanRun took place on the festival grounds.

== Merchandise ==
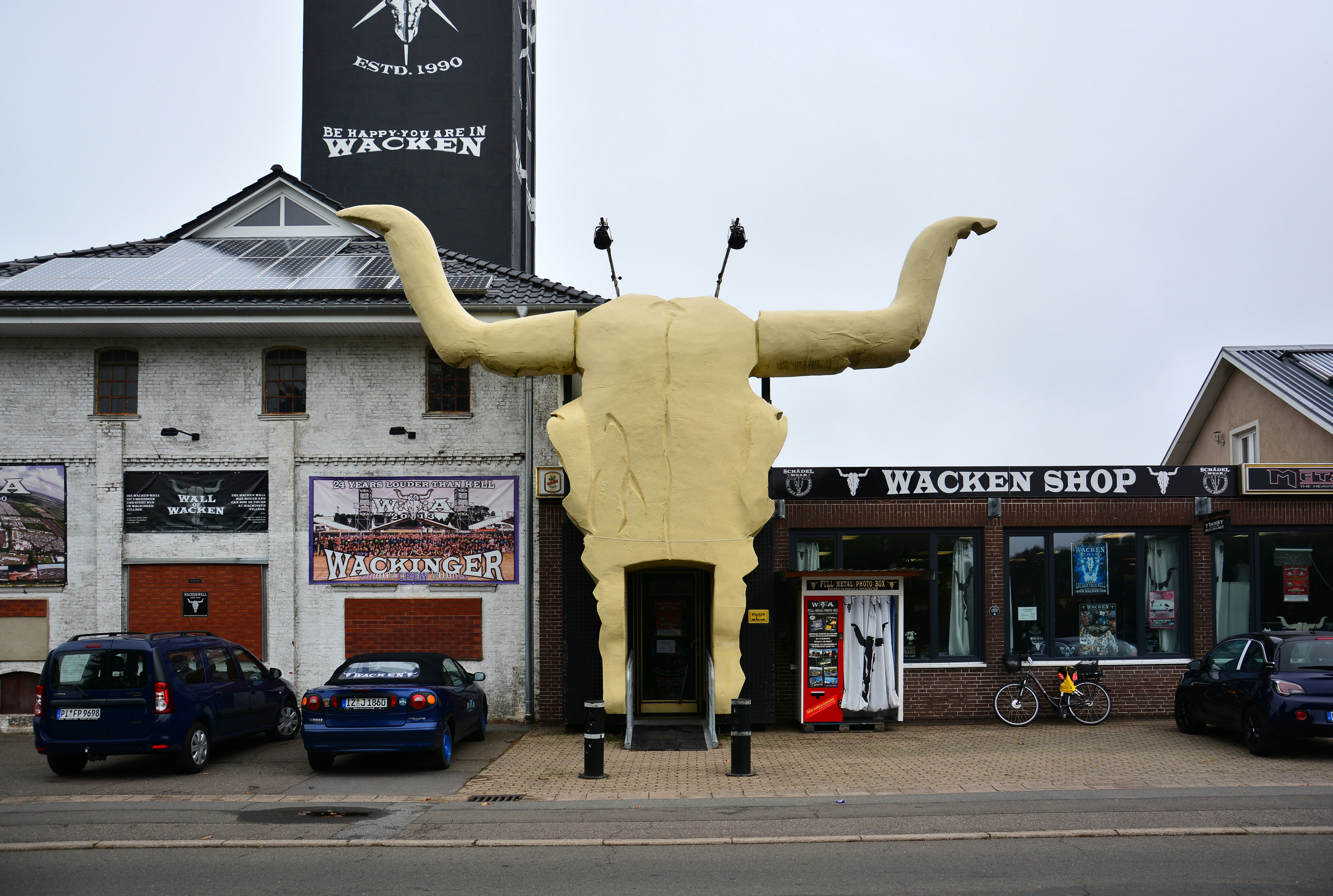
The Wacken Shop, 2014

A wide range of merchandising has also been developed over the years. In addition to T-shirts CDs and DVDs, the festival also has accompanying print media. The W:O:A History Book contains the open-air's history up until 2005. The book Die Wahrheit über Wacken ("The truth about Wacken", Oidium Verlag 2005, new edition published at Verlag Andreas Reiffer 2011) provides a more humorous account of the festival.

In 2005, Wacken Premium Pilsner was sold for the first time. It was produced in the Bavarian brewery Maximiliansbrauerei in Chieming. At W:O:A 2006 and 2007, the beer was available as well, this time produced in 0.5-litre bottles by the Flensburger brewery. The large number of glass shards later forced the organisers to switch to 0.5-litre cans.

As a motto, the phrase "See you in Wacken - Rain or Shine" has established itself alongside "Faster, Harder, Louder". Additionally, the festival features the sentence "Louder Than Hell" in its advertising.

The organisers of Wacken Open Air have released a live DVD every year since 2003:

- Metal Overdrive: Wacken Overdrive, 2003
- Armageddon Over Wacken 2003, 2003
- Armageddon Over Wacken 2004, 2004
- Armageddon Over Wacken 2005, 2005
- Wacken 2006 – Live at W:O:A, 2006
- Wacken 2007: Live at Wacken Open Air, 2007
- Wacken 2008: Live at Wacken Open Air, 2008
- Wacken 2009: Live at Wacken Open Air, 2009
- Wacken 2010: Live at Wacken Open Air, 2010
- Wacken 2011: Live at Wacken Open Air, 2011
- Wacken 2012: Live at Wacken Open Air, 2012
- Wacken 2013: Live at Wacken Open Air, 2014
- Wacken – Der Film, 2014
- 25 Years of Wacken: Snapshots, Sraps, Thoughts & Sounds, 2015
- Wacken 2014: Live at Wacken Open Air, 2015
- Live At Wacken 2015 – 26 Years Louder Than Hell, 2016
- Live at Wacken 2016 – 27 Years Louder Than Hell, 2017
- Live at Wacken 2017 – 28 Years Louder Than Hell, 2018
- Live at Wacken 2018 - 29 Years Louder Than Hell, 2019
- Live at Wacken 2019 - 30 Years Birthday Harder Louder than hell, 2019

== Media ==
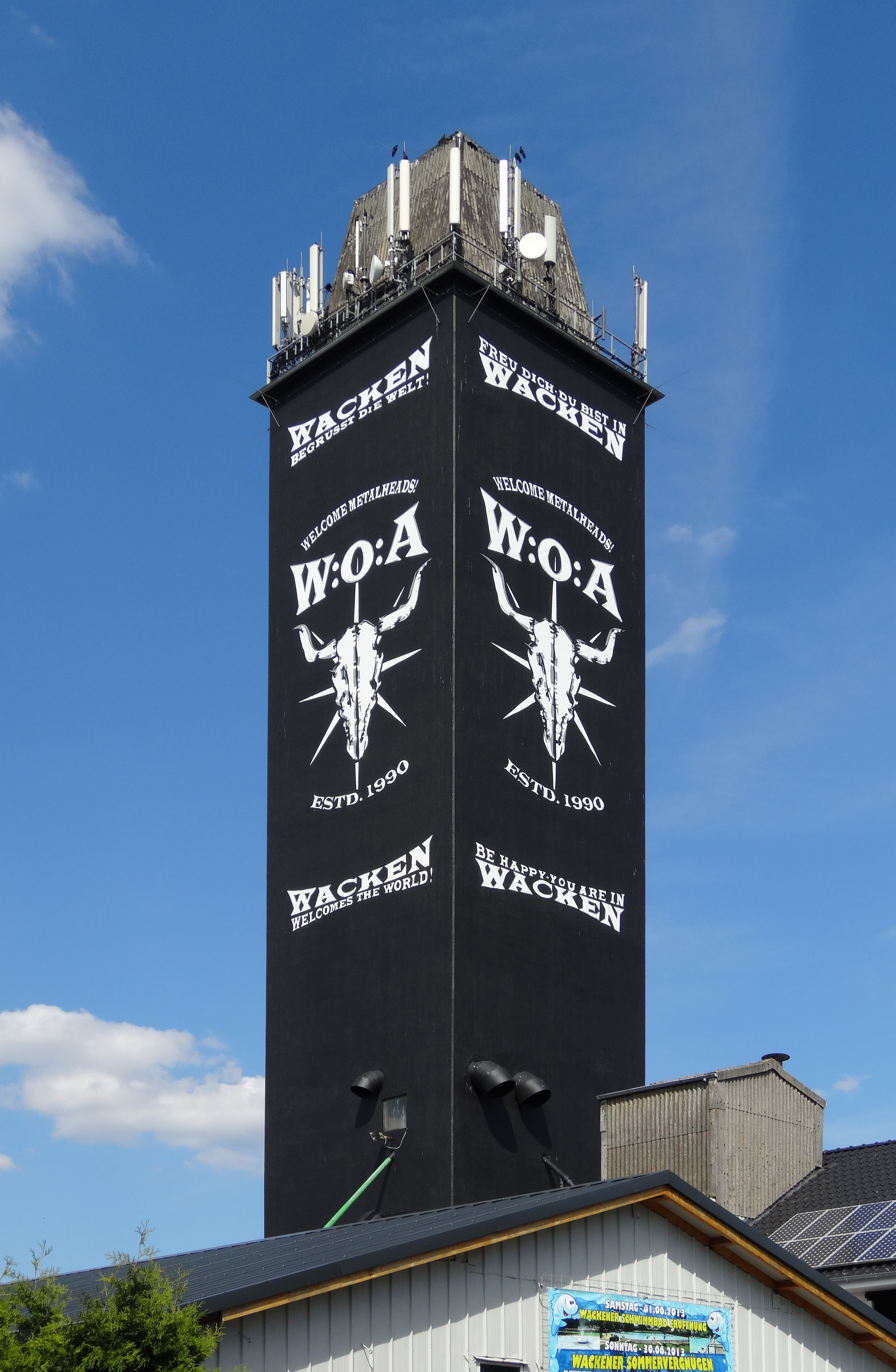
The 'Wacken tower' at the festival entrance, 2013

=== Documentaries ===
German television has produced numerous Wacken Open-Air documentaries in recent years. The following list is therefore not complete:

- Metalheads, documentary on the 10th anniversary of Wacken Open Air (director: Thomas Greiner)
- Nordland, documentary on the 15th anniversary of Wacken Open Air (director: Thomas Greiner (author))
- Full Metal Village, 2006 (Director: Cho Sung-Hyung)
- Ein Dorf im Ausnahmezustand - A village in a state of emergency / Three days of Wacken - Bauernschlau und Heavy-Metal, 2006 (film by Petra Petersen, NDR)
- Rockpalast (WDR), Festival Wacken-Open-Air, 2006, 2007 and 2009, each approx. 2 h documentary, can be downloaded free of charge in the media library of the public broadcaster (as of February 2016)
- Wahnsinn Wacken, 2007 (DMAX) approx. 1 h documentary
- Ein Dorf und 100.000 Rockfans, 2008 (ZDF)
- Metaller die auf Brüste starren, 2010
- Road To Wacken - The Movie, 2011
- Heavy Metal auf der Wiese, 2011 (NDR) (Director: Manfred Studer)
- Heavy Metal trifft Karniggels - Detlev Buck goes Wacken, 2012 (NDR) (Director: Nils Utzig)
- Heiter, harder, louder, 2013 (NDR) (Director: Nils Utzig)
- Alles auf Schwarz – Wacken!!! Sarnau und Hübner bei den Metalheads, 2013 (NDR) (Director: Nils Utzig)
- Wacken 3D, 2014 (Director: Norbert Heitker) - also in 2D.
- 25 Years Louder Than Hell - The W:O:A Documentary, Jun 2015, DVD and Blu-ray, 3 Eps. 45 min, 1 h 5 min, 42 min, original sound: German, English, and Spanish with subtitles in German, English.
- Road To Wacken, 2016 (DMAX) - two-part documentary (45 min each) about the band Blind Guardian, who plan, prepare and perform their set at W:O:A, as well as the festival itself, its visitors, the village of Wacken and its inhabitants.
- Welcome to Wacken - A Documentary Film in Virtual Reality, Jul 2017 (Director: Sam Dunn), °360 VR Film in English in five parts, with animations of the festival area.[87][88]
- Der Wacken-Wahnsinn, Wie geht das? NDR Television, August 2018
- Legend of Wacken | Making Of | RTL+ RTL+ Television, July 2023
- W:O:A - Wacken Open Air Festival: Schlammfest des Heavy Metal | WELT HD DOKU August 2023

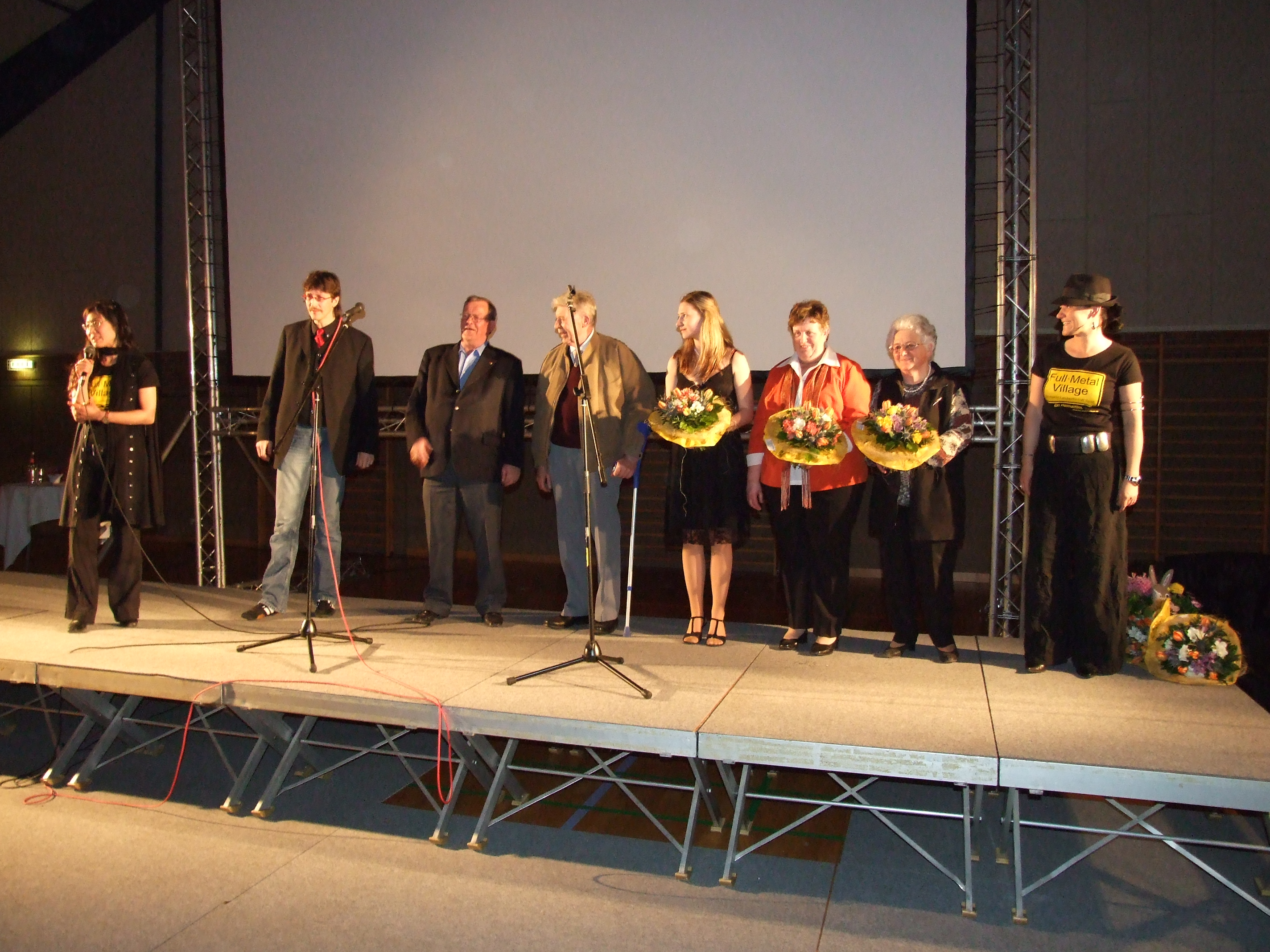
From left to right: director Cho Sung-Hyun, presenter Bern Stölting and subjects of the film at the pre-premiere in Wacken: Uwe Trede, Klaus Plähn, Ann-Kathrin Schaak, Lore Trede and Irma Schaack. Taken in 2007.

Since 1999, various documentaries about W:O:A have been made. The first documentary, Metalheads - The Official Documentary, was produced in 1999 on the occasion of the festival's 10th anniversary and was released on VHS by Rock Hard in 2000. The film team lived on the festival grounds for ten days prior to the actual start of the festival and documented the work of construction workers, farmers such as Uwe Trede, villagers, fans and organisers. Although the film shows excerpts from performances by some of the bands and interviews with the artists, it is more of a behind-the-scenes documentary. The film was produced with the simplest means, including a professional Hi8 and a Mini-DV camera and a team of three, and was regarded by the organisers as a trial run on the subject of film. According to the organisers, a total of 10,000 copies were made and sold. The film Nordland was shot for the 15th edition of W:O:A, but was only used for internal promotion. Both films were made by Thomas Greiner.

The documentary Metal: A Headbanger's Journey by Sam Dunn (2005) features Wacken Open Air. The festival is described as a Mecca of Heavy Metal. The film Full Metal Village by director Cho Sung-Hyung, made in 2005 and 2006, portrays the people of Wacken dealing with the festival. In 2006, she was awarded the main award of the Hessischer Filmpreis and the Schleswig-Holstein Filmpreis for best documentary. Full Metal Village was the first documentary ever to win the Max Ophüls Award for young filmmakers in 2007. WDR-Rockpalast profiled the festival in 2006, 2007, and 2009 with two-hour documentaries. Broadcaster DMAX also sent a camera team and produced a one-hour documentary on the construction of W:O:A in 2007.

ZDF television filmed the 30-minute feature Ein Dorf und 100.000 Rockfans about Wacken Open Air 2008.

The aforementioned projects are almost identical in content; they invite visitors, organisers, and the citizens of Wacken to comment on the festival and generally present it in a positive way. However, there has been criticism of the fact that the Wacken Firefighters have been featured too prominently. The three Rockpalast documentaries focus on interviews with the musicians and the performances of the bands.

Another perspective is offered by the low-budget production Metaller die auf Brüste starren ("The Metalheads Who Stare At Breasts", title based on The Men Who Stare At Goats), which five festival attendees shot during their stay at Wacken. "Offener Kanal Bad Offenbach" is listed as its official producer. The film shows the festival from the filmmakers' (subjective) point of view and comments on the events in the style of New Journalism. In contrast to other documentaries, this one focuses on the fans. Whether it's a documentary in the true sense of the word or whether the film is just entertainment remains controversial. The filmmakers themselves avoid this question and classify their work as a "trash documentary". The film premiered on 5 May 2011.

Schleswig-Holstein's Prime Minister Peter Harry Carstensen (CDU) commented on the opening of W:O:A 2009: "I don't come here to listen to the music, but I do identify with the festival".

=== Live albums recorded at Wacken ===
Numerous bands have recorded their performances at Wacken Open Air and released them as audio CDs or DVDs. The following list contains only full live albums and no albums containing only individual live tracks from the festival:

- Hypocrisy – Hypocrisy Destroys Wacken, 1999
- Rose Tattoo – 25 to Live, 2000
- Tygers of Pan Tang – Live at Wacken, 2001
- Grave Digger – Tunes of Wacken – Live, 2002
- Twisted Sister – Live at Wacken: The Reunion, 2005
- Bloodbath – The Wacken Carnage, 2005
- Scorpions – Live at Wacken Open Air 2006
- Emperor – Live at Wacken Open Air 2006
- Dimmu Borgir – The Invaluable Darkness, 2007
- Rage – Live in Wacken 2007 (bonus DVD for the album Carved in Stone), 2008
- Mambo Kurt – The Orgel Has Landed: Live at Wacken, 2008
- Lacuna Coil - Visual Karma (Body, Mind and Soul), 2008
- Avantasia – The Flying Opera, 2008
- Die Apokalyptischen Reiter – Tobsucht (Reitermania over Wacken & Party.San), 2008
- Atheist – Unquestionable Presence: Live at Wacken, 2009
- Heaven & Hell: Neon Nights: 30 Years of Heaven & Hell (CD & DVD format), 2009
- Exodus – Shovel Headed Tour Machine – Live at Wacken, 2010
- Grave Digger – The Clans Are Still Marching, 2010
- Immortal – The Seventh Date of Blashyrkh, 2010
- Rage – Live in Wacken 2009 (bonus DVD for the album Strings to a Web), 2010
- At the Gates – Purgatory Unleashed – Live at Wacken, 2010
- Running Wild – The Final Jolly Roger
- Motörhead – The Wörld Is Ours – Vol. 2: Anyplace Crazy as Anywhere Else, 2011
- Saxon – Heavy Metal Thunder – Live – Eagles Over Wacken, 2012
- Sacred Reich – Live At Wacken Open Air, 2012
- Degradead – Live at Wacken And Beyond, 2012
- Megaherz – Götterdämmerung: Live At Wacken 2012, 2012
- Gorgoroth – Live at Wacken 2008, 2012
- God Seed – Live at Wacken, 2012
- Atrocity – Die Gottlosen Jahre – Live In Wacken, 2012
- Ministry – Enjoy The Quiet: Live at Wacken 2012, 2013
- Airbourne – Live at Wacken 2011, 2013
- Nightwish – Showtime, Storytime, 2013
- Alice Cooper – Raise The Dead : Live From Wacken, 2014
- Circle II Circle – Live at Wacken (Official Bootleg), 2014
- Deep Purple – From the Setting Sun … In Wacken (recorded in 2013), 2015
- Sabaton – Heroes On Tour, 2015
- Europe – War Of Kings Special Edition, DVD/BluRay 2 Live at Wacken, 2015
- Danko Jones – Live at Wacken (recorded in 2015), 2016
- Judas Priest – Battle Cry, 2016
- Unisonic – Live in Wacken, 2017
- Hansen & Friends – Thank You Wacken live, 2017
- Arch Enemy – As The Stages Burn! (recorded in 2016), 2017
- Status Quo – Down Down & Dirty at Wacken (recorded in 2017), 2018
- Accept – Symphonic Terror - Live at Wacken 2017, 2018
- Epica – Live in Wacken, 2018
- Parkway Drive – Viva The Underdogs, 2020
- Sabaton – 20th Anniversary Show (recorded in 2019), 2021
- Dream Theater – Lost Not Forgotten Archives: Live at Wacken (2015) (recorded in 2015), 2022
- Powerwolf – Hallowed be the Holy Ground: Live at Wacken 2019, 2022
- Visions of Atlantis – Pirates over Wacken (record in 2022), 2023
- Tarja Turunen – Rocking Heels: Live at Metal Church (recorded in 2016), 2023

=== Other media ===
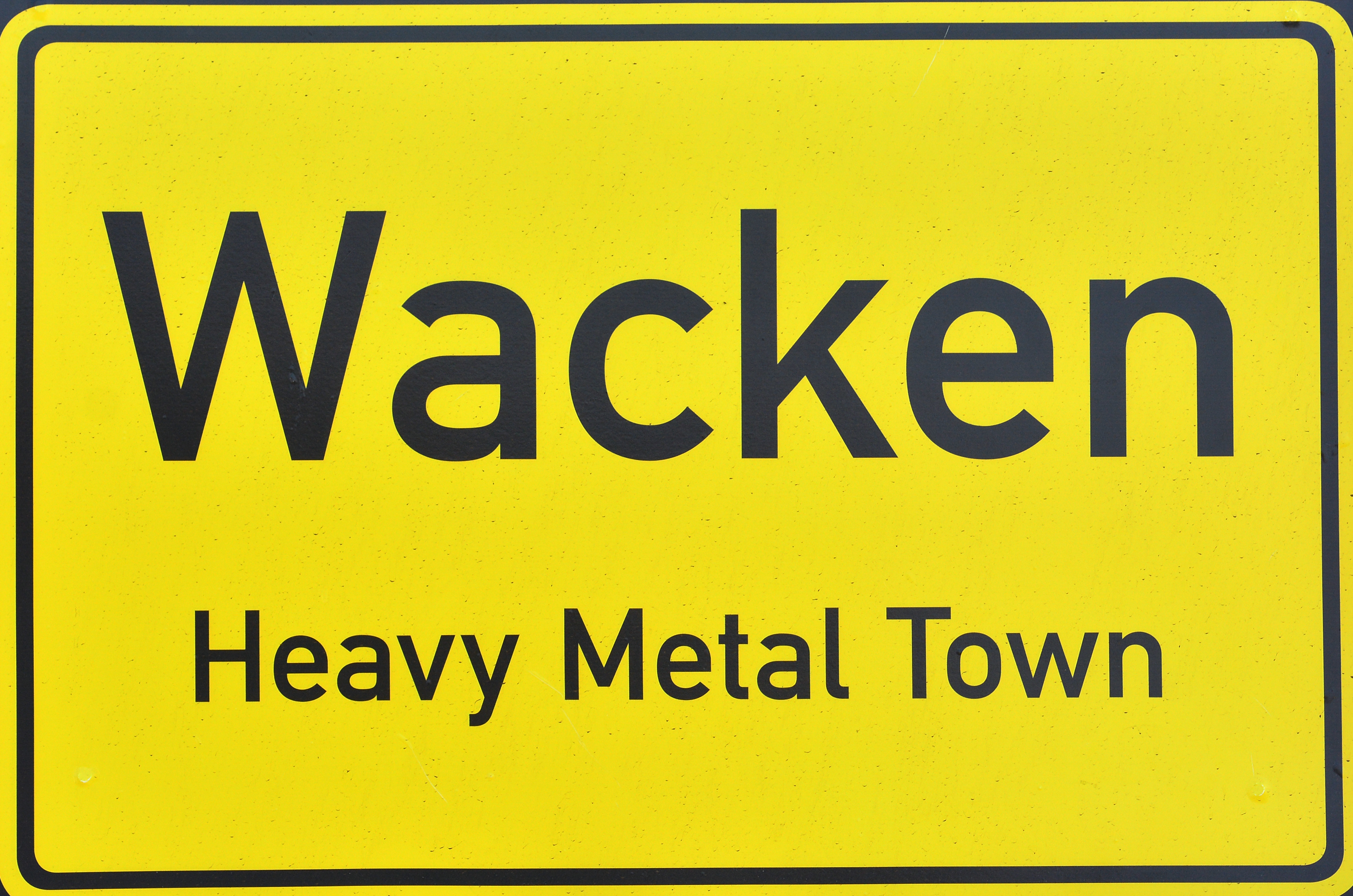
Fictional place-name sign at Wacken Open Air 2014

On 12 July 2023 the broadcaster RTL+ started airing the first season of six episodes of the mini series Legend of Wacken The plot is about the struggle of the founders to kick off their festival idea with comedy and satiric style. When Holger is nearly electrocuted by a live wire he (in a coma) and his co-organizer Thomas reflect on their creation, the Wacken Open Air Heavy Metal Festival that in 1990 had an audience of 800 and now attracts 100,000 fans per year.

In her crime novels Tod in Wacken and Der Teufel von Wacken, author Heike Denzau places her storylines at Wacken Open Air, describing the location as well as the festival and its visitors.

To mark its 30th anniversary, the Norddeutsche Rundschau published a special edition that offered insights into the organisation of the Wacken Open Air. In addition, there will be a special exhibition at the Prinzesshof Kreismuseum in Itzehoe to mark the anniversary.

Selected concerts of Wacken Open Air 2014 were broadcast live in an online stream. Furthermore, the cooperation between Spiegel Online and Arte made some performances available as video on demand.

== Awards ==
- In 2008, W:O:A received the Live Entertainment Award (LEA) for best festival of 2007.
- Wacken Open Air 2018 was named the best major festival at the European Festival Awards 2018 and best festival at the Helga! Awards.
