= Purgatory Unleashed – Live at Wacken =

Purgatory Unleashed

Live album by At the Gates
- Released: 22 March 2010
- Recorded: Wacken Open Air, Germany
- Genre: Melodic death metal
- Length: 1:13:00
- Label: Earache

At the Gates chronology
The Flames of the End (2010)	Purgatory Unleashed (2010)	At War with Reality (2014)

Professional ratings
Review scores
Source	Rating
About.com	4.5/5 stars
AllMusic	4.5/5 stars

Purgatory Unleashed – Live at Wacken is the first live album by Swedish melodic death metal band At the Gates. It was released on 22 March 2010 via Earache Records.

== Background ==
In summer 2008 At the Gates returned for a final tour. At the time, these were supposed to be the band's final shows; however, as of October 2013 the band has continued to play shows. This album was recorded at the Wacken Open Air festival. A DVD from the same show, The Flames of the End, has been released. The title Purgatory Unleashed is a line from the song "Blinded by Fear".

== Track listing ==
No.	Title	Album	Length
1.	"Slaughter of the Soul"	Slaughter of the Soul	3:10
2.	"Cold"	Slaughter of the Soul	3:15
3.	"Terminal Spirit Disease"	Terminal Spirit Disease	3:57
4.	"Raped by the Light of Christ"	With Fear I Kiss the Burning Darkness	3:50
5.	"Under a Serpent Sun"	Slaughter of the Soul	4:32
6.	"Windows"	The Red in the Sky Is Ours	4:39
7.	"World of Lies"	Slaughter of the Soul	3:56
8.	"The Burning Darkness"	With Fear I Kiss the Burning Darkness	3:03
9.	"The Swarm"	Terminal Spirit Disease	3:33
10.	"Forever Blind"	Terminal Spirit Disease	4:13
11.	"Nausea"	Slaughter of the Soul	2:52
12.	"The Beautiful Wound"	Terminal Spirit Disease	4:33
13.	"Unto Others"	Slaughter of the Soul	3:44
14.	"All Life Ends"	Terminal Spirit Disease	6:22
15.	"Need"	Slaughter of the Soul	3:24
16.	"Blinded by Fear"	Slaughter of the Soul	2:53
17.	"Suicide Nation"	Slaughter of the Soul	3:50
18.	"Kingdom Gone"	The Red in the Sky Is Ours	7:14
Total length:			1:13:00

== Personnel ==
Adapted from Allmusic credits.

=== At the Gates ===
- Tomas "Tompa" Lindberg – vocals
- Anders Björler – guitar
- Martin Larsson – guitar
- Jonas Björler – bass
- Adrian Erlandsson – drums
