= Skitsystem =

Swedish crust punk band

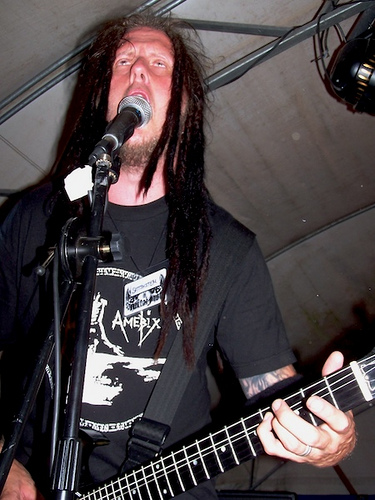
- Frontman Fredrik Wallenberg

Background information
- Origin: Gothenburg, Sweden
- Genres: Crust punk, grindcore, D-beat
- Years active: 1994–2007, 2009–present
- Labels: Distortion, Havoc, Barbarian
- Spinoff of: At the Gates
- Members: Fredrik Wallenberg; Andreas Axelsson; Martin Larsson; Karl "Kalle" Persson
- Past members: Tomas "Tompa" Lindberg; Adrian Erlandsson; Alex Höglind; Micke Kjellman

Skitsystem (Swedish pronunciation: [ˈɧîːtsʏˌsteːm]; literally "Shit System") is a Swedish crust punk band formed in early 1994. The band members originally came from different death metal bands, bonding over a common interest in punk music, particularly D-beat. Initially the group was a side-project of two members of At the Gates. The band announced in December 2007 that they were on indefinite hiatus. However in November 2009, Skitsystem signified their return to activity after the group announced plans to play two shows in Gothenburg in late February 2010.

Frontman Fredrik Wallenberg cites the group's initial influences as Anti Cimex, Asocial, Discharge, Doom and Disrupt.

== Band members ==
Current

- Fredrik Wallenberg – guitar, vocals (1994–present) (The Lurking Fear)
- Karl "Kalle" Persson – drums (1997–present) (Dispense)
- Martin Larsson – bass (2010–present) (Agrimonia, At the Gates, House of Usher, Macrodex, ex-Bombs of Hades)
- Andreas Axelsson – guitar (2019–present) (Disfear, The Deadbeats, Tormented, ex-Infestdead, ex-Total Terror, ex-Marduk, ex-Necronaut, ex-Edge of Sanity, ex-Incapacity, ex-The Dontcares, ex-Tortyr)

Live

- Albin Sköld - drums (2024-) (CHILD)

Former

- Alex Höglind – bass, vocals (1994–2010) (Golden Silver, Straight Edge My Ass)
- Tomas "Tompa" Lindberg – guitar, vocals (1994–2004) (At The Gates, Sign of Cain, The Lurking Fear, ex-Grotesque, ex-Infestation, Ben-Hur, Disfear, The Great Deceiver, ex-Lock Up, ex-Nightrage, ex-The Crown, ex-Necronaut, ex-Liers in Wait, ex-Sacrilege, ex-Conquest, ex-Hide, ex-Snotrocket, ex-World Without End)
- Adrian Erlandsson – drums (1994–1997) (At The Gates, The Haunted, The Lurking Fear, ex-Decameron, ex-H.E.A.L., ex-Needleye, ex-Terror, Nemhain, ex-Brujeria, ex-Cradle of Filth, ex-Netherbird, ex-Nifelheim, ex-Paradise Lost, ex-Riket, ex-Samsas Traum, ex-12 Ton Method, ex-Tenet, ex-Vallenfyre, ex-Hyperhug, ex-Penance (Swe), ex-Deathstars)
- Mikael "Micke" Kjellman – guitar, vocals (2003–2019) (Martyrdöd, Sanctuary in Blasphemy, ex-Neolithium, ex-Zonetripper)

== Discography ==
=== Albums ===
- 1999 – Grå Värld / Svarta Tankar LP/CD
- 2001 – Enkel Resa Till Rännstenen LP/CD
- 2006 – Stigmata LP/CD

=== EPs ===
- 1995 – Profithysteri 7-inch|Profithysteri 7-inch
- 1996 – Ondskans Ansikte 10-inch
- 2003 – Allt E Skit

=== Split albums ===
- 1997 – Levande Lik 7-inch (split with Wolfpack)
- 2002 – Det tunga missbrukets karga ingenmansland/Det eviga hatet 7-inch (split with Nasum)
- 2006 – split 7-inch with Cyness
