= The Puritan (album) =

Studio album by Nightrage
- Released: 24 April 2015
- Recorded: 2014 at Dug Out Productions, Uppsala, Sweden
- Genre: Melodic death metal
- Length: 37:53
- Label: Despotz (Sweden)
- Producers: George Nerantzis and Daniel Bergstrand

Nightrage chronology
Insidious (2011)	The Puritan (2015)	The Venomous (2017)

Professional ratings
Review scores
Source	Rating
Rock Hard	8/10 stars
Metal.de	7/10 stars
Metal Hammer Germany	6/7 stars
Powermetal.de	7/10 stars
Dead Rhetoric	9/10 stars

The Puritan is the sixth full-length studio album by the Greek/Swedish melodic death metal band, Nightrage. It was released by Despotz on 24 April 2015. It is their first album with new vocalist Ronnie Nyman.

== Track listing ==
All lyrics are written by Marios Iliopoulos and Ronnie Nyman; all music is composed by Marios Iliopoulos and Ronnie Nyman.

No.	Title	Length
1.	"The Puritan"	4:11
2.	"With a Blade of a Knife"	2:52
3.	"Desperate Vows"	4:13
4.	"Endless Night"	4:09
5.	"Foul Vile Life"	3:13
6.	"Stare into Infinity"	3:36
7.	"Lone Lake" (Instrumental)	2:14
8.	"Son of Sorrow"	3:25
9.	"When Gold Turns to Rust"	3:10
10.	"Fathomless"	3:25
11.	"Kiss of a Sycophant"	3:25

== Credits ==
=== Band members ===
- Ronnie Nyman − vocals
- Marios Iliopoulos − guitars
- Anders Hammer – bass
- Johan Nunez − drums

=== Guest musicians ===
- Lawrence Mackrory – additional vocals on "Desperate Vows"
- Staffan Winroth – keyboards on "Lone Lake"
