= Rusted Eyes Awake =

Studio album by Landmine Marathon
- Released: October 2008
- Recorded: May – June 2008 at Arcane Digital Recording in Chandler, Arizona
- Genre: Death metal, grindcore
- Length: 31:47
- Label: Level Plane Records

Landmine Marathon chronology
Landmine Marathon / Scarecrow (2007)	Rusted Eyes Awake (2008)	Landmine Marathon / The Funeral Pyre (2009)

Professional ratings
Review scores
Source	Rating
Allmusic	3/5 stars
Metalstorm	(8/10)

Rusted Eyes Awake is the second full-length studio album by the Arizona-based metal band Landmine Marathon. The album was originally released on Level Plane Records in October 2008, and was the second full-length Landmine Marathon release on that label, the first of which was Wounded. It was also the last release of the band before the label ended operations. The album was reissued by Prosthetic Records on August 18, 2009.

Antony Hämäläinen (Armageddon, ex-Nightrage), and Jony Davy (Job for a Cowboy) supplied guest vocals on "Bled to Oblivion" and "Red Days", respectively.

== Track listing ==
- All songs written and arranged by Landmine Marathon.
1. "Bile Towers" – 4:33
2. "Certain Death" – 2:10
3. "Bled To Oblivion" – 3:20
4. "Xenocide" – 5:18
5. "Heroin Swine" 4:41
6. "Skin From Skull" – 4:30
7. "Red Days" – 2:32
8. "Rusted Eyes Awake" – 4:43
