= Doomsday King =

Studio album by The Crown
- Released: 27 September 2010
- Recorded: 2009–2010
- Studio: Studio-MT
- Genre: Melodic death metal, thrash metal
- Length: 44:07
- Label: Century Media
- Producer: The Crown, Marko Tervonen

The Crown chronology
Crowned Unholy (2004)	Doomsday King (2010)	Death Is Not Dead (2015)

Doomsday King is the eighth studio album by Swedish melodic death metal band The Crown which was released on 27 September 2010 via Century Media Records.

A music video was made for "Doomsday King" and "Falling 'neath the Heaven's Sea".

== Reception ==
Professional ratings
Review scores
Source	Rating
Blabbermouth.net	8.5/10
Metal.de	8/10
Metal Storm	8.5/10

Jordan Campbell of Last Rites compared the album to Possessed 13 calling "Angel of Death 1839" "fuckin' vicious". He also stated that after "Age of Iron", the whole experience becomes mediocre. Specifically, the vocalist, Jonas Stålhammar loses its flavor. Campbell also criticized the roles of Olsfelt, Tervonen, and Sunesson who lost their charm here due to their previous experience with other bands such as Angel Blake and Engel. Songs like "The Tempter and the Bible Black", "Soul Slasher", "Desolation Domain" are also have their flaws such as the tiring sounds and unfulfilled ambitions and false promises.

Scott Alisoglu of Blabbermouth.net had praised the album quoting saying: "When that first menacing riff blackens the sun, that vibrato sends a shiver up the spine, and that ominous bell clangs, the anticipation of what's to come is powerful enough to put down a bull elephant".

Larry Owens of the Teeth of the Divine praised songs such as "Age of Iron", "Through Eyes of Oblivion" and "Soul Slasher" while calling "The Tempter and the Bible Black", "Blood O.D." and "He Who Rises In Might" as mundane and boring.

Praising for those songs also came from No Clean Singing and Loud with the latter of which commented that despite repetitive nature, the album is a solid release, but suggests to listen to Deathrace King or Crowned in Terror before listening to this one.

== Track listing ==
Doomsday King track listing
No.	Title	Length
1.	"Doomsday King"	4:06
2.	"Angel of Death 1839"	3:47
3.	"Age of Iron"	3:12
4.	"The Tempter and the Bible Black"	4:40
5.	"Soul Slasher"	3:21
6.	"Blood O.D."	4:08
7.	"Through Eyes of Oblivion"	3:48
8.	"Desolation Domain"	4:51
9.	"From the Ashes I Shall Return"	6:08
10.	"He Who Rises in Might – From Darkness to Light"	6:06
Total length:		44:07

Digipak edition bonus tracks
No.	Title	Length
11.	"Die Before Dying" (Valcyrie cover)	3:33
12.	"In Bitterness and Sorrow" (Re-recorded version)	3:27
13.	"Kill 2010" (Re-recorded version)	1:33
14.	"Falling 'neath the Heaven's Sea"	3:21

== Personnel ==
=== The Crown ===
- Marko Tervonen – guitars
- Janne Saarenpää – drums
- Marcus Sunesson – guitars
- Jonas Stålhammar – vocals
- Magnus Olsfelt – bass

=== Production ===
- Dragan Tanasković – mastering
- Gustavo Sazes – artwork
- Marko Tervonen – engineering, mixing, mastering
- Patrik Skoglöw – photography
