= Landmine Marathon =

American death metal band

- Origin: Phoenix, Arizona, United States
- Genres: Death metal
- Years active: 2004–2015
- Labels: Level Plane, Deep Six Records
- Members: Krysta Martinez; Ryan Butler; Dylan Thomas; Matt Martinez; Raul Varela
- Past members: Mike Waldron; Grace Perry

Landmine Marathon was an American death metal band from Phoenix, Arizona. Formed in 2004, the band was signed to Prosthetic Records, with Deep Six Records exclusively releasing the vinyl versions of their albums.

== History ==
=== Formation, "Demos" and "Wounded"(2005–2006) ===
Landmine Marathon was founded in Phoenix, Arizona late 2004 by Perry and Martinez, with founding members Mike Waldron, Eric Saylor, Mike Pohlmeier and Nick Ziska. Originally, Landmine Marathon took much of its songwriting influence from powerviolence and Scum era Napalm Death, with average song lengths under one minute.

In April 2005, Landmine Marathon entered Ryan Butler's Arcane Digital Recording Studios to record a seven-song demo that was self-released for a summer tour. Upon returning from their summer tour, the band parted ways with third guitarist Ziska and began to develop their sound, drawing influence from early European death metal bands. In late 2005, the band returned to Arcane Digital Recording Studios to record a four-song demo. The second demo caught the attention of Greg Drudy, owner of Level Plane Records, who offered to release the band's first full-length album Wounded.

Wounded was recorded by Ryan Butler at Arcane in March 2006, and it was released in July 2006. The band celebrated the release with its first full United States tour. Upon completion of their summer tour, Saylor left the band and was replaced by longtime friend and engineer Ryan Butler.

=== "Rusted Eyes Awake" and "Sovereign Descent" (2007–2010) ===
With the addition of Butler to Landmine Marathon's lineup, songwriting evolved to include more structured songwriting and the use of guitar solos. February 2007 saw the release of a split EP with Bay Area thrashers Scarecrow, which was released by Level Plane Records.

After an early 2008 West Coast Tour, Waldron left the band to return to college. He was replaced briefly by live guitarist Jeff Owens. With Butler now the primary songwriter, the band continued to write new songs which made up Landmine Marathon's second full-length album Rusted Eyes Awake which was released in October 2008 by Level Plane Records. Rusted Eyes Awake features guest vocals from Armageddon/ex-Nightrage vocalist Antony Hämäläinen and Job For A Cowboy vocalist Jonny Davy Shortly after the release of Rusted Eyes Awake, Owens was replaced by Dylan Thomas.

In 2009 Landmine Marathon signed to Prosthetic Records who promptly re-released Rusted Eyes Awake. The album was a success with fans, and ended up taking home the Album of the Year Award at the 2009 Arizona Ska Punk Awards. The band also took home the Best Grindcore Band and Best Female Fronted Band Awards that same year, as well as the following year in 2010, and had previously won both of the awards in the past years at the 2007 and 2008 Awards Ceremonies.

2009 saw Landmine Marathon take part in both the New England Metal and Hardcore Festival and the Los Angeles Murderfest.

In late 2009 Landmine Marathon entered Arcane Digital to record their next album Sovereign Descent, which was released in March 2010. Sovereign Descent featured artwork from Dan Seagrave and was mastered by Alan Douches.

Landmine Marathon spent much of 2010 on the road in support of Sovereign Descent, including an appearance at the second Scion Rock Fest in Columbus Ohio, Many shows at Austin TX's South by Southwest Festival, Fun Fun Fun Fest afterparty and a North American tour with labelmates Skeletonwitch. Mid tour cycle, Pohlmeier announced his departure from the band and was immediately replaced by Andy York.

=== "Gallows" and Perry's departure (2011–present) ===
Landmine Marathon spent much of the first half of 2011 writing and recording the follow-up to 2010's Sovereign Descent. The result was Gallows, again recorded by Butler at Arcane Digital and featured the artwork of Deviated Instinct's Rob "Mid" Middleton. Gallows was released in September 2011 (USA) and January 2012 (internationally) to much critical acclaim, including Terrorizer Magazine's Album of the Month.

After the release of Gallows, York was replaced by Impaled drummer Raul Varela.

In October 2012, Grace Perry left the band on good terms to pursue non-musical endeavors. Perry was replaced by Transient's Krysta Martinez. Martinez had worked as a vocalist with the band before, on the track "Dead Horses" from Gallows."

== Band members ==
Current members

- Matt Martinez – bass guitar (2004–present)
- Ryan Butler – guitar (2006–present)
- Dylan Thomas – guitar (2008–present)
- Krysta Martinez – lead vocals (2012–present)
- Raul Varela – drums (2012–present)

Former members

- Nick Ziska – guitar (2004–2005)
- Eric Saylor – guitar (2004–2006)
- Mike Waldron – guitar (2004–2008)
- Mike Pohlmeier – drums (2004–2010)
- Grace Perry – lead vocals (2004–2012)
- Andy York – drums (2010–2011)

Live members

- Jeff Owens – guitar (2008)

== Discography ==
Studio albums

- Wounded (2006)
- Rusted Eyes Awake (2008/ Reissued 2009)
- Sovereign Descent (2010)
- Gallows (2011)

Extended plays

- Split 12"/ CD EP with Scarecrow (2007)
- Split 7" with The Funeral Pyre (2009)
- Self Titled 7" (2012)

Demos

- Seven Song Demo (2005)
- Four Song Demo (2005)

== Videography ==
=== 2010 ===
Song: "Shadows Fed To Tyrants"
Album: Sovereign Descent
Director: David Brodsky

=== 2012 ===
Song: "Beaten And Left Blind"
Album: Gallows
Director: Raul Varela
