= The Venomous =

Studio album by Nightrage
- Released: 31 March 2017
- Recorded: 31 August and 30 September 2016
- Studios: Zero Gravity, Athens, Greece
- Genre: Melodic death metal
- Length: 49:42
- Label: Despotz (Sweden)
- Producers: Marios Iliopoulos; Terry Nikas

Nightrage chronology
The Puritan (2015)	The Venomous (2017)	Wolf to Man (2019)

Professional ratings
Review scores
Source	Rating
Rock Hard	8/10 stars
Metal.de	8/10 stars
Metal Hammer Germany	5/7 stars
Powermetal.de	6.5/10 stars
Dead Rhetoric	8.5/10 stars

The Venomous is the seventh full-length studio album by the Greek/Swedish melodic death metal band Nightrage. It was released by Despotz on 31 March 2017, format CD/LP/digital. The album was recorded by Terry Nikas at Zero Gravity studios in Athens, Greece, and mixed and mastered by Lawrence Mackrory at Maskinrummet studio in Uppsala, Sweden. The Venomous was also released in Japan by record label Avalon/Marquee. The Bonus Track for Japanese release is an alternative version of the instrumental song "Denial of the Soul".

== Track listing ==
No.	Title	Lyrics	Music	Length
1.	"The Venomous"	Nyman, Iliopoulos	Iliopoulos	4:31
2.	"Metamorphosis/Day of Wrath"	Nyman, Iliopoulos	Iliopoulos, Söderman	3:52
3.	"In Abhorrence"	Nyman, Iliopoulos	Iliopoulos, Söderman	3:37
4.	"Affliction"	Nyman, Iliopoulos	Söderman, Iliopoulos	4:27
5.	"Catharsis"	Nyman, Iliopoulos	Iliopoulos, Söderman	4:55
6.	"Bemoan"	Nyman, Iliopoulos	Iliopoulos, Söderman	4:07
7.	"The Blood"	Nyman, Iliopoulos	Söderman, Iliopoulos	4:12
8.	"From Ashes into Stone"	Nyman, Iliopoulos	Iliopoulos, Söderman	3:41
9.	"Trail of Ghosts"	Nyman, Iliopoulos	Iliopoulos, Söderman	4:50
10.	"Disturbia"	Nyman, Iliopoulos	Iliopoulos, Söderman	4:25
11.	"Desolation And Dismay"	Nyman, Iliopoulos	Iliopoulos	4:03
12.	"Denial of The Soul" (Instrumental)	—	Iliopoulos	3:01

== Videography ==
Music videos were filmed for two of the album's tracks, "The Venomous" and "Affliction". Both videos were directed by Rawrec productions.

== Credits ==
=== Band members ===
- Ronnie Nyman − vocals
- Marios Iliopoulos − guitars
- Magnus Söderman − guitars
- Anders Hammer – bass
- Lawrence Dinamarca − drums

=== Guest musicians ===
- Lawrence Mackrory – Additional vocals on "Affliction" and "The Blood".
- Peter Sundström – String/keys arrangements on "Denial of the Soul"
