= Abyss Rising =

Studio album by Nightrage
- Released: 18 February 2022
- Genre: Melodic death metal
- Length: 38:55
- Label: Despotz Records
- Producer: Fredrik Nordström

Nightrage chronology
| Wolf to Man (2019) | Abyss Rising (2022) | Remains of a Dead World (2024) |

Singles from Abyss Rising
- 1. "Abyss Rising" Released: 30 March 2021; 2. "Falsifying Life" Released: 28 May 2021; 3. "Nauseating Oblivion" Released: 22 November 2021; 4. "Dance of Cerberus" Released: 11 February 2022; 5. "False Gods" Released: 24 February 2022

Professional ratings
Review scores
| Source | Rating |
|---|---|
| Metal.de | 7/10 |
| Metal Hammer Germany | 5/7 stars |
| Ox-Fanzine | 4/5 stars |
| Rock Hard | 8/10 |
| Powermetal.de | 7.5/10 |

Abyss Rising is the ninth studio album by Greek/Swedish melodic death metal band Nightrage, released on 18 February 2022 through Despotz Records. Music videos were released for some tracks including "Falsifying Life".

== Track listing ==
| No. | Title | Length |
|---|---|---|
| 1. | "Abyss Rising" | 3:31 |
| 2. | "Swallow Me" | 3:39 |
| 3. | "Nauseating Oblivion" | 3:15 |
| 4. | "Dance of Cerberus" | 3:27 |
| 5. | "Falsifying Life" | 3:42 |
| 6. | "Portal of Dismay" (instrumental) | 0:59 |
| 7. | "Shadows Embrace Me" | 4:14 |
| 8. | "9th Circle of Hell" | 3:24 |
| 9. | "The Divergent" (instrumental) | 1:54 |
| 10. | "Cursed by the Gift of Sight" | 3:14 |
| 11. | "False Gods" | 3:46 |
| 12. | "Pest Ridden Tide" | 2:49 |
| 13. | "Silence of the Darkened Soul" (instrumental) | 1:01 |

== Personnel ==
- Ronnie Nyman − vocals
- Marios Iliopoulos − guitars
- Magnus Söderman − guitars
- Francisco Escalona – bass
- Dino George Stamoglou − drums

=== Additional ===
- Erik "Candyrock" Sjölander – backing vocals
- Kristofer Jönson – backing vocals
- Fredrik Nordström – producer, mixing, master, recording
- Jon Toussas – cover art, layout
