= Insidious =

Insidious may refer to:

- Insidious (film), a 2010 horror movie
  - Insidious (film series), its franchise
- Insidious (soundtrack), 2011 soundtrack album
- Insidious (Mephisto Walz album), 2004
- Insidious (Nightrage album), 2011
