= Meridian Dawn =

Multinational heavy metal band

- Genres: Melodic death metal; death metal
- Years active: 2012–present
- Members: Antony Hämäläinen; Nick Ziros; Ibrahim Hechavarria; Seth Funk; Nathan Bigelow
- Past members: Christopher Cussell; Brandon Johnson; Johan Nunez

Meridian Dawn is an international death metal band.

== History ==
The band was conceived by vocalist Antony Hämäläinen (Armageddon, Nightrage), drummer Johan Nunez (Kamelot, Nightrage, Firewind, Marty Friedman), guitarist Brandon Johnson, bassist/guitarist Nicholas Ziros (Into the Moat, Remembering Never), and guitarist Christopher "CJ" Cussell. Songs were written after about a year of file exchange as the majority of the band lived in different parts of the world. On 25 March 2014 the band released its first ever EP titled The Mixtape. It is a collection of five songs that were created in different studios, with different producers from both Sweden and the United States respectively.

Engineered and mixed by Meridian Dawn and mastered once again by Jeff Cloyes (311, Lauryn Hill, Plies, Remembering Never), The Fever Syndrome was released 10 July 2020 in both digital streaming and limited deluxe digipack edition via Seeing Red Records.

== Musical style ==
Meridian Dawn's music is generally considered a mixture of European death metal and melodic death metal. The Age of Metal observes "vocal contrasts between clean and guttural vocals are impressive, and the production value goes beyond expectation for an EP release". VarietyOfDeathZine commented the band "has a modern and melodic approach to metal while also being very heavily influenced by death metal which shows up mostly in the vocals."

== Band members ==
Current

- Antony Hämäläinen – vocals (2012–present)
- Nicholas Ziros – lead guitar (2014–present), bass (2012–2014)
- Ibrahim Hechavarria – rhythm guitar (2020–present)
- Seth Funk – bass (2020–present)
- Nathan Bigelow – drums (2020–present)

Former

- Christopher Cussell – guitars (2012–2014)
- Brandon Johnson – guitars (2012–2014)
- Johan Nunez – drums (2012–2020)

Session

- Jonah Weingarten – keyboards and orchestration (2021)

== Discography ==
=== Studio albums ===
List of extended plays
Title	Album details
The Fever Syndrome	Released: 10 July 2020; Label: Seeing Red; Formats: CD, DL

=== EPs ===
List of extended plays
Title	EP details
The Mixtape	Released: 25 March 2014; Label: Self-released; Format: DL
Dissolving Bonds	Released: 14 February 2021; Label: Seeing Red; Format: DL
Pagan Poetry	Released: 30 April 2021; Label: Seeing Red; Format: DL

=== Singles ===
Year	Song	Album
2014	"Thieves"	The Mixtape
2020	"Iconic"	The Fever Syndrome
2020	"God to All"	The Fever Syndrome
2020	"Luminescent"	The Fever Syndrome
2020	"The Moonlit Path"	Pagan Poetry
2020	"Pagan Poetry"	Pagan Poetry
