= Crossing the Rubicon (Revisited) =

Studio album by Armageddon
- Released: October 2016
- Studio: The Panic Room Skövde, Sweden
- Genre: Melodic death metal
- Length: 41:17
- Label: Listenable Records
- Producer: Thomas "PLEC" Johansson

Crossing the Rubicon (Revisited) is the re-recording of the debut album by the Swedish melodic death metal band Armageddon, and released by Listenable Records. This is the first album with the band to feature ex-Nightrage vocalist Antony Hämäläinen.

== Track listing ==
1. "2022" (Intro) – 2:01 (instrumental)
2. "Godforsaken" – 4:39
3. "The Juggernaut Divine" – 5:15
4. "Astral Adventure" – 5:15
5. "Funeral in Space" – 3:09 (instrumental)
6. "Asteroid Dominion" – 4:53
7. "Galaxies Away Pt.2 (Through The Wormhole)" – 2:46 (instrumental)
8. "Faithless" – 2:14
9. "Children of the New Sun" – 2:45 (instrumental)
10. "Into the Sun" – 4:38
11. "Nothing Is Nothing" – 3:46
12. "Forbidden Zone" (instrumental bonus track) – 3:47

== Personnel ==
- Antony Hämäläinen – vocals
- Christopher Amott – guitar, backing vocals
- Joey Concepcion – guitar
- Andrew Pevny – bass
- Márton Veress – drums
