= Nyren =

Nyren is a surname. Notable people with this surname include:

- Carl Nyrén (1917–2011), Swedish architect
- John Nyren (1764–1837), English cricket player and author
- Jonas Nyrén, Swedish metal vocalist
- Njogu Demba-Nyrén (born 1979), Gambian football player
- Pål Nyrén (born 1955), Swedish biochemist
- Richard Nyren (1734–1797), English cricket player
