= Wolf to Man =

Studio album by Nightrage
- Released: 29 March 2019
- Recorded: 2018
- Genre: Melodic death metal
- Length: 43:56
- Label: Despotz (Sweden)
- Producer: Marios Iliopoulos, Magnus Söderman and Ronnie Nyman

Nightrage chronology
The Venomous (2017)	Wolf to Man (2019)	Abyss Rising (2022)

Professional ratings
Review scores
Source	Rating
Rock Hard	8/10 stars
Metal.de	7/10 stars
Powermetal.de	7/10 stars
Metal Hammer Germany	5/7 stars
Sputnikmusic	3.3/5 stars
Kaaoszine	3.5/5 stars
Dead Rhetoric	8.5/10 stars

Wolf to Man is the eighth full-length studio album by the Greek/Swedish melodic death metal band, Nightrage. It was released by Despotz on 29 March 2019.

== Track listing ==
All lyrics are written by Marios Iliopoulos, Magnus Söderman and Ronnie Nyman; all music is composed by Marios Iliopoulos, Magnus Söderman and Ronnie Nyman.

No.	Title	Length
1.	"Starless Night"	4:31
2.	"Wolf to Man"	3:52
3.	"Embrace the Nightrage"	3:03
4.	"Desensitized"	4:27
5.	"God Forbid"	3:42
6.	"By Darkness Drawn"	3:29
7.	"The Damned"	3:34
8.	"Arm Aim Kill"	3:41
9.	"Gemini"	4:14
10.	"Disconnecting the Dots"	4:01
11.	"Escape Route Insertion"	3:28
12.	"Lytrosis" (Instrumental)	1:54

== Credits ==
=== Band members ===
- Ronnie Nyman − vocals
- Marios Iliopoulos − guitars
- Magnus Söderman − guitars
- Francisco Escalona – bass
- Dino George Stamoglou − drums

=== Guest musicians ===
- Joakim Honkanen – additional background vocals
- Lawrence Dinamarca – additional drums
