= Eternal death =

Eternal death may refer to:

- Eternal Death, 1997 Crown of Thorns album
- Eternal oblivion, concept of consciousness forever ceasing after death
- Second death, concept in Christianity and Judaism of punishment after a first death
