= Antony Hämäläinen =

Finnish singer (born 1980)

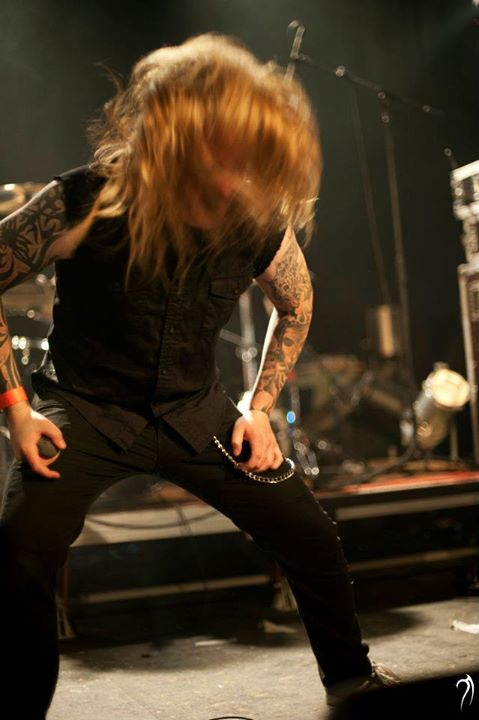
- Hämäläinen performing with Nightrage in 2012

Background information
- Born: August 28, 1980 (age 46)
- Origin: Finland
- Genres: Death metal, black metal, melodic death metal, deathgrind, thrash metal
- Occupation: Vocalist
- Member of: Til The End, Terrorizer
- Formerly of: Nightrage, Armageddon

Antony Hämäläinen (born August 28, 1980) is a Finnish extreme metal vocalist living in the United States.

== Biography ==
In the early 1990s, Hämäläinen started playing bass, drums, and singing for multiple bands based both in the US and Finland.

In September 2007, he joined the Gothenburg based melodic death metal band Nightrage.

In March 2015, Armageddon, a Swedish melodic death metal band led by former Arch Enemy guitarist Christopher Amott, announced him as their permanent vocalist.

He was one of the only known singers to have auditioned for Fear Factory in 2021.

As of August 2026 Hämäläinen has been fronting and touring with grindcore legends Terrorizer.

== Style ==
In reference to Hämäläinen's work on the Nightrage album Wearing a Martyr's Crown, Sputnikmusic wrote that Hämäläinen "has a lot of vocal similarities to Tomas Lindberg, which brings back a resemblance to their original sound from their first two albums". Added to his clean vocals "he can still maintain a melodic edge, but he only does it every now and again within the album; he only does it for the purpose of giving some of the songs a musical edge so the listener doesn't fall asleep thinking that the only new addition of style is just a higher use of acoustic guitars".

== Discography ==
=== With Nightrage ===
- Wearing a Martyr's Crown (2009)
- Macabre Apparitions EP (2011)
- Insidious (2011)
- Remains of a Dead World (2024)

=== With Meridian Dawn ===
- The Mixtape EP (2014)
- The Fever Syndrome (2020)
- The Moonlite Path (single) (2021)

=== With Armageddon ===
- Armageddon It! LIVE in Japan (2015)
- Crossing the Rubicon (Revisited) (2016)

=== With Til The End ===
- Higher And Beyond (single) (2024)
- Dark Kings EP (2025)
- Til The End (2026)

=== Live session ===
- Amaranthe – vocals, live (September 14, 2012, at ProgPower USA XIII, Atlanta, Georgia)
- Ancient Settlers - vocals, live (2020-2023)

=== Guest appearances ===
- Rusted Eyes Awake (2008) by Landmine Marathon – guest vocals on "Bled to Oblivion"
- The Essence of Decay (2009) by Rising Pain – guest vocals on "Feel Less Alive" and "Am I Awake"
- Self Destruct Syndrome (2011) by Neverborne – guest vocals on "Mechanical Ruin"
- Apathy's Throne EP (2011) by Nervosia – all vocals
- Of Unsound Minds (2012) by AfterBlood (feat. Tom Angelripper) – guest vocals on "The More I Lie"
- The Darkest of Angels (2015) by Dead by Wednesday – all vocals on "Defining Fire"
- The Outsider (2016) by The Outsider – all vocals on "The Race That Failed"
- Lakewind Whispers EP (2017) by Nordjärvi – all vocals
- No Longer the Sun Rise (2018) by Earthward (feat. Adrian Erlandsson) – all vocals
- Daughter Chaos EP (2018) by Daughter Chaos – all vocals
- Ghostdance (2019) by Crystal Tears - all vocals
- Nosi Balasi (Filipino version) (2019) by Crystal Tears - all vocals
- Autumnus EP (2021) by Ancient Settlers – all vocals
- Sense of Noise (2021) by Sense Of Noise – guest vocals on "Rage of Existence"
- Crawl Into Your Grave (2022) – by Crystal Tears - all vocals
- Our Last Eclipse (2022) by Ancient Settlers – all vocals
- Autumnus Live Sessions (2022) by Ancient Settlers – all vocals
- Brand New Disease (2023) by Slaves For Scores – all vocals
- You Could Be Mine (2023) by Crystal Tears - all vocals
- Remains of a Dead World (2024) by Nightrage - Lyrical edits
- Athanato (2025) by Crystal Tears - all vocals

=== Compilation appearances ===
- Holier Than Thou by Nightrage for Metal Hammer Magazine, Greece ("And Coverz for All – A Greek Tribute to Metallica") – vocals
