= Death Is Not Dead =

Studio album by The Crown
- Released: 13 January 2015
- Genre: Melodic death metal
- Length: 1:08:01
- Label: Century Media
- Producer: The Crown, Marko Tervonen

The Crown chronology
Doomsday King (2010)	Death Is Not Dead (2015)	Cobra Speed Venom (2018)

Professional ratings
Review scores
Source	Rating
Brave Words & Bloody Knuckles	8/10
Metal.de	9/10
Metal Hammer	3.5/5 stars
Metal Injection	8/10
Stormbringer	3.5/5 stars

Death Is Not Dead is the ninth studio album by Swedish melodic death metal band The Crown which was released by Century Media Records on 13 January 2015. In this album, Johan Lindstrand returned for the first time since his departure after Possessed 13 came out in 2003. The album is the first not to feature lead guitarist Marcus Sunesson or drummer Janne Saarenpää, with Robin Sorqvist replacing the former. Drums on this album were performed by guitarist Marko Tervonen, except track 4 which features Henrik Axelsson. Axelsson would go on to join the band officially and appears on the following two albums.

The album was released to coincide with the 25th anniversary of the band. It was remastered and reissued in 2026 featuring all bonus tracks.

== Track listing ==
Death Is Not Dead track listing
No.	Title	Length
1.	"Reign"	1:54
2.	"Headhunter"	4:52
3.	"Iblis Bane"	4:08
4.	"Eternal"	4:03
5.	"Struck by Lightning"	4:59
6.	"Speed Kills (Full Moon Ahead)"	3:34
7.	"Herd of Swine"	4:49
8.	"Horrid Ways"	5:16
9.	"Ride To Ruin"	5:49
10.	"Meduseld"	5:43
11.	"Godeater"	5:14
Total length:		1:08:01

=== Bonus CD ===
The "Bonus CD" of the album came with two extra tracks, namely: "We Come In Peace (Piece By Piece)" 4:42 long and "Agent Orange" which was 6:01 in length.

== Personnel ==
The Crown

- Magnus Olsfelt – bass
- Johan Lindstrand – vocals
- Robin Sorqvist – guitars
- Marko Tervonen – guitars, drums
- Henrik Axelsson – drums (on track 4)

Production

- M. Engstrom – mixing
- Kenneth Johansson – photography
- Thomas Ewerhard – cover art, layout
- Kenneth Svensson – mastering
- Marcus Sunesson – recording
- Marko Tervonen – recording
- Chris Silver – producer, recording, mixing
- Mark Brand – artwork
