= The Mixtape (Meridian Dawn EP) =

The Mixtape EP

EP by Meridian Dawn
- Released: March 25, 2014
- Recorded: 2013–2014
- Genres: Melodic death metal; death metal
- Length: 20:43
- Label: Self-released
- Producers: Thomas "PLEC" Johansson; Daniel Antonsson; Nicholas Ziros; Jeff Cloyes

Meridian Dawn chronology
The Mixtape EP (2014)	The Fever Syndrome (2020)

Singles from The Mixtape EP
- 1. "Thieves" Released: 16 March 2014

Professional ratings
Review scores
Source	Rating
Scream Magazine	2/6

The Mixtape EP is the debut EP of the melodic death metal band Meridian Dawn. It was released on 25 March 2014. The mixtape features a guest appearance from Joacim "Jake E" Lundberg (Cyhra, ex-Amaranthe) on the track "Dressed In Ice". "Thieves" would be released as a lyric video single directed by Niklas Sundin (Dark Tranquillity, Cabin Fever Media).

== Track listing ==
No.	Title	Writer(s)	Length
1.	"Thieves"		3:47
2.	"The Fever Syndrome"		3:30
3.	"Dressed in Ice" (featuring Joacim "Jake E" Lundberg)		5:00
4.	"I Don't Wanna Be Me" (Type O Negative cover)	Peter Steele	3:52
5.	"Descent" (Fear Factory cover)	Burton C. Bell, Dino Cazares, Christian Olde Wolbers, Raymond Herrera	4:35
Total length:			20:43

== Personnel ==
=== Band members ===
- Antony Hämäläinen – vocals, lyrics
- Christopher Cussell – rhythm and lead guitar
- Brandon Johnson – rhythm guitar
- Nicholas Ziros – rhythm and lead guitar, bass
- Johan Nunez – drums

=== Additional personnel ===
- Joacim "Jake E" Lundberg – vocals on "Dressed in Ice"
- Gustavo Sazes – cover art, design
