= Cobra Speed Venom =

Studio album by The Crown
- Released: 16 March 2018
- Studio: Studio Fredman
- Genre: Melodic death metal
- Length: 64:10
- Label: Metal Blade
- Producer: The Crown, Fredrik Nordström

The Crown chronology
Death Is Not Dead (2015)	Cobra Speed Venom (2018)	Royal Destroyer (2021)

Professional ratings
Review scores
Source	Rating
Anti Hero Magazine	8/10
Blabbermouth.net	9/10
Brave Words	8.5/10
Exclaim!	8/10
Rock 'N' Load	7/10
Toilet ov Hell	4/5 stars

Cobra Speed Venom is the tenth studio album by Swedish melodic death metal band The Crown. The album was released on 16 March 2018 via Metal Blade Records and featured an appearance of Robin Sorqvist and Henrik Axelsson.

== Release ==
The Crown announced that their album Cobra Speed Venom would be released in January 2018. On 14 February 2018, the band released debut music video for their title song "Cobra Speed Venom". The recording was officially released on 16 March 2018 in the United States and the European Union on a Digipak-CD containing 11 singles and two bonus tracks, with a third bonus track exclusive to the Japan CD. Exclusively for the European Union, the band have released the vinyl in three colors: the violet blue marbled, pale lilac marbled, and purple red splattered. The US exclusive vinyl was in white and purple splattered or dusk blue splattered variations.

== Track listing ==
Cobra Speed Venom track listing
No.	Title	Length
1.	"Destroyed by Madness"	5:15
2.	"Iron Crown"	3:23
3.	"In the Name of Death"	4:57
4.	"We Avenge!"	5:16
5.	"Cobra Speed Venom"	4:55
6.	"World War Machine"	5:05
7.	"Necrohammer"	4:01
8.	"Rise in Blood"	2:58
9.	"Where My Grave Shall Stand"	4:35
10.	"The Sign of the Scythe"	7:02
11.	"Nemesis Diamond" (Deluxe edition and Japan bonus track)	3:47
12.	"The Great Dying" (Deluxe edition and Japan bonus track)	6:04
13.	"Ride the Fire" (Japan bonus track)	3:22
Total length:		64:10

== Personnel ==
- Johan Lindstrand – vocals
- Magnus Olsfelt – bass
- Henrik Axelsson – drums
- Marko Tervonen – guitar
- Robin Sorqvist – lead guitar, backing vocals

== Charts ==
Chart performance for Cobra Speed Venom
Chart (2018)	Peak position
Austrian Albums (Ö3 Austria)	66
German Albums (Offizielle Top 100)	34
Swiss Albums (Schweizer Hitparade)	99
