= Live the Storm =

Studio album by Disfear
- Released: 22 January 2008
- Recorded: July/August 2007 at Godcity Recording Studio
- Genres: Crust punk, d-beat
- Length: 35:03
- Label: Relapse Records
- Producers: Kurt Ballou; Disfear

Disfear chronology
Misanthropic Generation (2003)	Live the Storm (2008)	The Last Nail (2026)

Professional ratings
Review scores
Source	Rating
Pitchfork Media	8.3/10
Allmusic	3.5/5 stars
Sputnikmusic	4.5/5 stars
Tiny Mix Tapes	4/5 stars

Live the Storm is the sixth album by Swedish hardcore punk/D-beat band Disfear. It was released in January 2008 under Relapse Records.

It is the final album by the band released in the lifetimes of members Henke Frykman, Tomas Lindberg and Marcus Andersson, all of whom respectively died of cancer in 2011, 2025 and 2026.

== Track listing ==
All tracks are written by Disfear.

No.	Title	Length
1.	"Get It Off"	3:17
2.	"Fiery Father"	2:39
3.	"Deadweight"	2:52
4.	"The Cage"	4:00
5.	"The Furnace"	4:12
6.	"Live the Storm"	2:19
7.	"Testament"	2:37
8.	"In Exodus"	3:32
9.	"Maps of War"	2:24
10.	"Phantom"	7:11

== Personnel ==
Disfear

- Tomas Lindberg - vocals
- Björn Peterson - guitars
- Uffe Cederlund - guitars
- Henke Frykman - bass
- Marcus Andersson - drums

Production

- Kurt Ballou - recording, mixing, engineering
- Henrik Jonsson - mastering
- Orion Landau - cover art
