= Descent into Chaos (Nightrage album) =

Studio album by Nightrage
- Released: 21 February 2005
- Recorded: 2004
- Genre: Melodic death metal
- Length: 42:52
- Label: Century Media
- Producer: Patrick J. Sten

Nightrage chronology
Sweet Vengeance (2003)	Descent into Chaos (2005)	A New Disease Is Born (2007)

Professional ratings
Review scores
Source	Rating
AllMusic	4/5 stars
Blabbermouth.net	7/10
Rock Hard	8.5/10
Metal.de	9/10
Metal Storm	8.5/10
Heavymetal.dk	6/10
Noise.fi	4/5 stars
Scream Magazine	4/6 stars

Descent into Chaos is the second full-length studio album by the Greek/Swedish melodic death metal band Nightrage. It was released by Century Media Records on 21 February 2005 in Europe, on 5 April 2005 in the US and by King Japan on 27 April 2005 in Japan. It was Nightrage's last album to feature Gothenburg vocalist Tomas Lindberg.

== Track listing ==
All lyrics are written by Marios Iliopoulos.

Descent into Chaos track listing
No.	Title	Music	Length
1.	"Being Nothing"	Iliopoulos	3:10
2.	"Phantasma"	Iliopoulos	3:32
3.	"Poems"	Iliopoulos, Gus G.	3:00
4.	"Descent into Chaos"	Iliopoulos	3:05
5.	"Frozen"	Iliopoulos, Gus G.	4:04
6.	"Drug"	Iliopoulos	4:06
7.	"Silent Solitude"	Iliopoulos	3:33
8.	"Omen"	Iliopoulos, Gus G.	3:44
9.	"Release"	Iliopoulos	3:08
10.	"Solus" (instrumental)	Iliopoulos, Gus G.	3:01
11.	"Jubilant Cry"	Iliopoulos	4:45
12.	"Reality Versus Truth"	Iliopoulos	3:36
Total length:			42:52

Japanese bonus track
No.	Title	Music	Length
13.	"Black Skies"	Gus G.	4:27
Total length:			47:19

== Personnel ==
- Tomas Lindberg − vocals
- Marios Iliopoulos − guitars
- Gus G. − guitars
- Henric Karlsson − bass guitar
- Fotis Benardo − drums
- Mikael Stanne − additional vocals ("Frozen")

=== Additional personnel ===
- Fredrik Nordström – keyboards
- Patrik J. Sten – guitars ("Phantasma", "Frozen"), backing vocals, samples, intros, effects ("Being Nothing", "Descent into Chaos", "Reality Versus Truth", "Jubilant Cry")

== Release history ==
Release history and formats for Descent into Chaos
Region	Date	Label
Europe	21 February 2005	Century Media
South Korea	7 March 2005	
North America	5 April 2005	Century Media
Japan	27 April 2005	King Japan
