= Disfear =

Swedish crust punk band

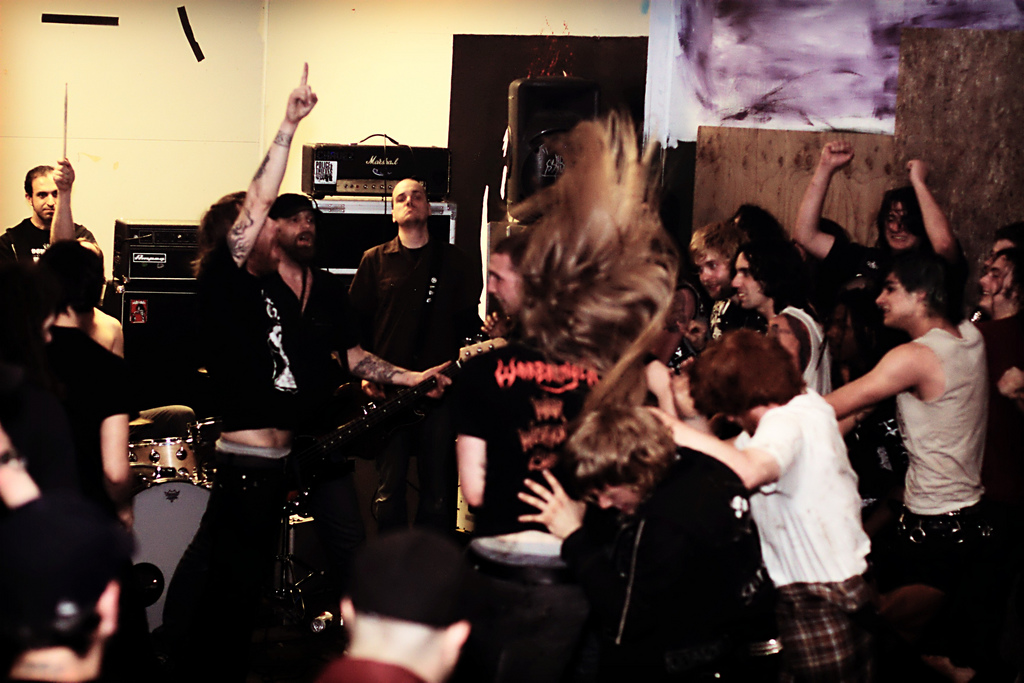
- Disfear in 2008

Background information
- Origin: Nyköping, Sweden
- Genres: Crust punk, death metal
- Years active: 1989–present
- Labels: No, Distortion, Osmose Productions, Relapse, Deathwish Inc.
- Members: Björn Peterson; Uffe Cederlund; Andreas Axelsson
- Past members: Marcus Andersson; Henke Frykman; Jeppe Lerjerud; Jan Axelsson; Jallo Lehto; Robin Wiberg; Tomas Lindberg
- Website: disfear.com

Disfear is a Swedish crust punk band that formed in the early 1990s and recorded sporadically over the years. After releasing the albums Soul Scars in 1995 and Everyday Slaughter in 1997, the group did not release another album until 2003 with a 12-track album, Misanthropic Generation, featuring vocalist Tomas Lindberg of At the Gates and The Great Deceiver. They later worked with Converge's Kurt Ballou for their album Live the Storm featuring Uffe Cederlund of Entombed.

Bassist Henke Frykman died of cancer on 25 March 2011, Vocalist Tomas Lindberg died of cancer on 16 September 2025. Marcus Andersson died from brain cancer in September 2026, at the age of 52.

== Influences ==
Tomas Lindberg has cited The Ramones, AC/DC, Motörhead, The Wipers, The Dead Boys, The Stooges, Jerry's Kids, Articles of Faith, and Uniform Choice as musical influences, as well as Michel Foucault as a conceptual influence. Other bands mentioned as inspirational include Discharge, Entombed, Turbonegro, Zeke, and Anti Cimex.

== Members ==
Current members

- Björn Peterson – guitar (1989–present)
- Uffe Cederlund – guitar (2004–present)
- Andreas Axelsson – bass (2014–present)

Former members

- Marcus Andersson – drums (1998–2026; his death)
- Henke Frykman – bass (1989–2011; his death)
- Jeppe Lerjerud – vocals (1989–1998)
- Jan Axelsson – drums (1989)
- Jallo Lehto – drums (1989–1995)
- Robin Wiberg – drums (1995–1998)
- Tomas Lindberg – vocals (1998–2025; his death)

== Discography ==
- Disfear (1992)
- A Brutal Sight of War (1993)
- Disfear/Uncurbed split EP (1993)
- Soul Scars (1995)
- Everyday Slaughter (1997)
- In Defence of Our Future, tribute to Discharge, contributing the song "Realities of War" (2001)
- Misanthropic Generation (2003)
- Powerload (2003; 7", Throne Records)
- Split with ZEKE (2004; 7", Relapse Records)
- Live the Storm (2008)
- Split with Doomriders (2008)
- The Last Nail (2026)
