= A New Disease Is Born =

Studio album by Nightrage
- Released: 12 March 2007
- Recorded: December 2006
- Studios: Hansen Studios, Ribe, Denmark
- Genre: Melodic death metal
- Length: 49:29
- Label: Lifeforce
- Producer: Jacob Hansen

Nightrage chronology
| Descent into Chaos (2005) | A New Disease Is Born (2007) | Wearing a Martyr's Crown (2009) |

Professional ratings
Review scores
| Source | Rating |
|---|---|
| AllMusic | 3.5/5 stars |
| Metal Storm | 7.2/10 |
| Rock Hard | 8/10 |
| Metal.de | 9/10 |
| Ox-Fanzine | 7/10 |
| Heavymetal.dk | 9/10 |
| Noise.fi | 3/5 stars |

A New Disease Is Born is the third full-length studio album by the Greek/Swedish melodic death metal band, Nightrage. It was released by Lifeforce Records on 12 March 2007.

The album features an entirely new lineup, excluding guitarist Marios Iliopoulos and bassist Henric Carlsson. Vampster's reviewer opined that the new singer Jimmie Strimell, replacing Tompa Lindberg, sounded "very generic" and that the band also sounded "more generic than ever". Powermetal.de however stated that A New Disease Is Born surpassed its predecessor Descent Into Chaos, "effectively silencing any doubters right out of the gate".

A New Disease Is Born appears in the lyrics to the song "Drug" from the previous album Descent into Chaos, which suggests a possible origin for the name of this album.

== Track listing ==
| No. | Title | Lyrics | Music | Length |
|---|---|---|---|---|
| 1. | "Spiral" | Carlsson | Iliopoulos, Carlsson, Strimell | 4:38 |
| 2. | "Reconcile" | Carlsson | Iliopoulos, Carlsson, Strimell | 4:25 |
| 3. | "Death-Like Silence" | Iliopoulos | Iliopoulos | 4:35 |
| 4. | "A Condemned Club" | Carlsson | Iliopoulos, Carlsson | 3:45 |
| 5. | "Scars" | Strimell | Iliopoulos, Strimell | 3:39 |
| 6. | "De-Fame" | Iliopoulos | Iliopoulos, Carlsson | 2:52 |
| 7. | "Scathing" | Iliopoulos | Iliopoulos, Carlsson, Strimell | 4:36 |
| 8. | "Surge of Pity" | Iliopoulos | Iliopoulos | 4:12 |
| 9. | "Encircle" | Carlsson | Iliopoulos | 3:33 |
| 10. | "Drone" | Carlsson | Iliopoulos | 3:23 |
| 11. | "Spiritual Impulse" | Carlsson, Strimell | Carlsson | 3:33 |
| 12. | "A New Disease Is Born" (Instrumental) | — | Iliopoulos | 2:58 |

Japanese Bonus track
| No. | Title | Lyrics | Music | Length |
|---|---|---|---|---|
| 13. | "Ostentatious" | Iliopoulos | Iliopoulos | 3:17 |

== Videography ==
The album features a video for the song, "Scathing" directed by Bob Katsionis.

== Credits ==
=== Band members ===
- Jimmie Strimell − vocals
- Marios Iliopoulos − guitars
- Henric Carlsson − bass
- Alexander Svenningson− drums

=== Guest musicians ===
- Jacob Hansen – end guitar solo in "Reconcile", additional clean vocals in "Spiral", "Reconcile", "Death-Like Silence", "A Condemned Club" and "Scars", keyboards in "Surge of Pity"
- Olof Mörck – second guitar solo in "Death-Like Silence"
- Elias Holmlid – keyboards in "Spiral", "Reconcile", "A Condemned Club", "Spiritual Impulse" and "Ostentatious"
