= Agrimonia (band) =

Swedish metal band

- Origin: Gothenburg, Sweden
- Genres: Crust punk, post-metal, sludge metal
- Years active: 2005–present
- Labels: Southern Lord
- Members: Christina Blom; Magnus Andreasson; Pontus Redig; Martin Larsson; Björn Eriksson
- Past members: Per Nilsson

Agrimonia is a heavy metal band from Sweden. Formed in 2005, the band released its self-titled demo in 2008 before releasing its first full-length, Host of the Winged, in 2010. Their second full-length album, Rites of Separation, was released in 2013. Major music websites such as Pitchfork have lauded the band's unique style and given it strong reviews, including an 8.0/10 for their second full-length album. The band is currently signed to Southern Lord Records, an American heavy metal label.

== Members ==
=== Current ===
- Christina Blom – vocals, keys (2005–present)
- Magnus Andreasson – guitar (2005–present)
- Pontus Redig – guitar, keys (2005–present)
- Martin Larsson – bass (2010–present) (Skitsystem, At The Gates, House Of Usher, Macrodex, ex-Bombs Of Hades)
- Björn Eriksson – drums (2005–present)

=== Past ===
- Per Nilsson – bass (2005–2010)

== Discography ==
=== Studio albums ===
- Host of the Winged (2010) – Profane Existence
- Rites of Separation (2013) – Southern Lord
- Awaken (2018) - Southern Lord

=== Demos ===
- Agrimonia (2008) – Self-released
