= Crowned Unholy =

Studio album by The Crown
- Released: 24 August 2004
- Recorded: September 2001 – 24 November 2003 at Bohus Sound Recording
- Genre: Melodic death metal
- Length: 43:37
- Label: Metal Blade Records
- Producer: The Crown

The Crown chronology
Possessed 13 (2003)	Crowned Unholy (2004)	Doomsday King (2010)

Crowned Unholy is the seventh studio album by Swedish melodic death metal band The Crown. It is a remake of the band's fifth studio album, Crowned in Terror, with re-recorded vocal tracks by Johan Lindstrand, re-recorded bass tracks by Magnus Olsfelt, a new version of the intro (originally written by guitarist Marko Tervonen) now programmed by drummer Janne Saarenpää, drum sound digitally enhanced by Janne, and synthesizer-enhanced parts, all programmed by Janne.

The album also contains a free DVD entitled The Crown Invades Karlsruhe, a professionally recorded show in Karlsruhe, Germany on 11 November 2003, while on tour performing Possessed 13.

== Reception ==
Professional ratings
Review scores
Source	Rating
Brave Words	8.5/10
Chronicles of Chaos	5/10
Rock Hard	8.5/10
Sputnikmusic	4/5 stars
Ultimate Guitar	7.3/10

In a March 2007 interview, The Crown frontman Johan Lindstrand was asked if he felt re-recording old tracks for the album was actually the right decision. "I think it was the wrong decision", revealed Lindstrand. "Having said that, it was also a chance for diehard fans to have all the albums with me, the original singer, on all of them.

On 24 November 2003, The Crown released a free DVD titled The Crown Invades Karlsruhe in Germany, which was a tie-in to the Crowned Unholy.

In 2018, The Crown announced the re-issue of Crowned Unholy vinyls. The vinyls will be sold as either dead gold marbled, opaque golden yellow marbled, or clear cover with black marbled vinyl inside in the European Union and clear old gold marbled vinyl in the United States.

Tim Pigeon of Last Rites praised the songs such as "Death Metal Holocaust", "Under the Whip" and "Death is the Hunter" but criticized the band's inclusion of clean vocals for "The Speed of Darkness".

== Track listing ==
=== CD ===
No.	Title	Length
1.	"House of Hades (Intro)"	1:01
2.	"Crowned in Terror"	5:00
3.	"Under the Whip"	3:58
4.	"Drugged Unholy"	4:11
5.	"World Below"	5:51
6.	"The Speed of Darkness"	5:11
7.	"Out for Blood"	2:44
8.	"(I Am) Hell"	4:17
9.	"Death Is the Hunter"	4:19
10.	"Satanist"	3:48
11.	"Death Metal Holocaust"	3:17
Total length:		43:37

=== DVD ===
No.	Title	Length
1.	"No Tomorrow"
2.	"Face of Destruction/Deep Hit of Death"
3.	"Deathexplosion"
4.	"World Below"
5.	"Deliverance"
6.	"Blitzkrieg Witchcraft"
7.	"Cold is the Grave"
8.	"Zombiefied"
9.	"Dream Bloody Hell/Kill 'Em All"
10.	"Under the Whip"
11.	"Bow to None"
12.	"Total Satan"
13.	"House of Hades/Crowned in Terror"
14.	"1999-Revolution 666"

== Personnel ==
The Crown

- Marcus Sunesson – guitars
- Johan Lindstrand – vocals
- Marko Tervonen – guitars
- Janne Saarenpää – drums, programming, synth
- Magnus Olsfelt – bass

Production

- Dragan Tanasković – engineering, mastering
- Oliver Barth – filming (bonus DVD)
- Snowy Shaw – photography
- Mark Brand – cover art, layout
- Tobias Basan – cover art, layout
- Janne Saarenpää – engineering
