= The Burning (The Crown album) =

Studio album by Crown of Thorns
- Released: June 1995
- Recorded: April 1995 at Berno Studio
- Genres: Death metal, thrash metal
- Length: 45:07
- Label: Black Sun
- Producers: Crown of Thorns, Berno Paulsson

Crown of Thorns chronology
The Burning (1995)	Eternal Death (1997)

Professional ratings
Review scores
Source	Rating
AllMusic	4/5 stars

The Burning is the debut album by Crown of Thorns, originally released in 1995 and later re-issued after the band changed their name to the Crown. The album shows the band's earlier "Satanic death metal" sound.

The song "Night of the Swords" attacks Holocaust deniers.

== Track listing ==
No.	Title	Length
1.	"Of Good and Evil"	3:27
2.	"Soulicide Demon-Might"	2:42
3.	"Godless"	4:00
4.	"The Lord of the Rings"	3:16
5.	"I Crawl"	5:16
6.	"Forever Heaven Gone"	3:29
7.	"Earthborn"	3:45
8.	"Neverending Dream"	4:01
9.	"Night of the Swords"	2:03
10.	"Candles"	6:35
11.	"Forget the Light"	6:33
Total length:		45:07

== Personnel ==
Crown of Thorns

- Magnus Olsfelt - bass
- Janne Saarenpää - drums
- Marcus Sunesson - guitar
- Marko Tervonen - guitar
- Johan Lindstrand - vocals

Production

- Kristian Wåhlin - album cover, logo
- Berno Paulsson - recording, engineering, mixing, producer
- Hasse Bergstedt - photography
