= The Deer Tracks =

Swedish electronic music duo

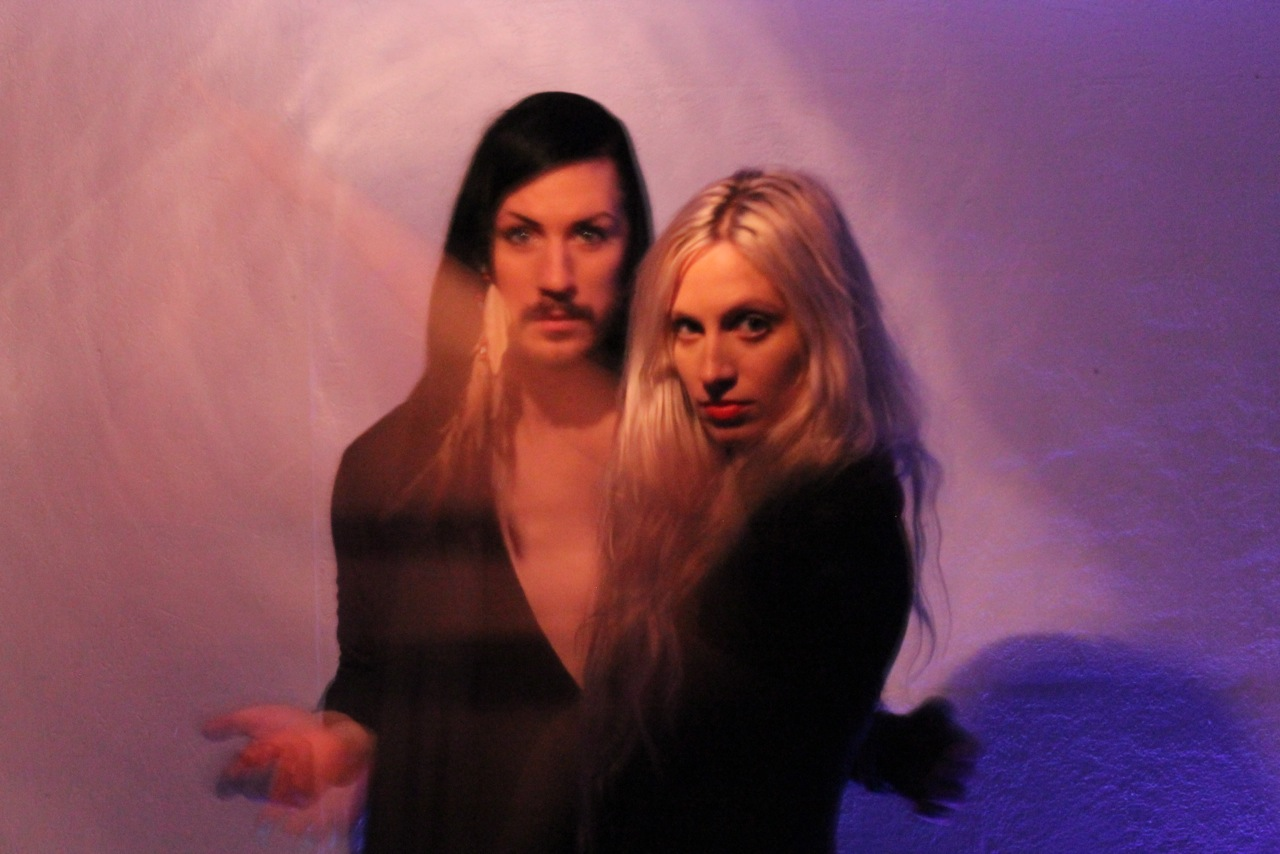

Background information
- Origin: Gävle, Sweden
- Genres: electronic
- Years active: 2006-present
- Labels: The Control Group, Sony Music Entertainment (Sweden), Vinyl Junkie Records (Japan), Warner Music Group
- Members: David Lehnberg; Elin Lindfors
- Website: www.thedeertracksmusic.com

The Deer Tracks are a Swedish electronic duo that combines the facets of multiple music genres into a unique sound. They are often compared to Nordic counterparts The Knife and Sigur Rós. The band’s genre transcendence contains up-tempo dance beats and folksy lyrics.

== Formation ==
Core members David Lehnberg and Elin Lindfors met at a party in their hometown of Gävle, Sweden when David asked Elin to sing backup vocals on a forthcoming project. They first generated buzz after the posting of their first track and continued working together. The band is managed by Scott Cohen and Richard Gottehrer.

== The Archer Trilogy ==
Early releases include debut album Aurora and the following EP Eggegrund with a subsequent tour of Europe and Japan. Soon after The Deer Tracks began creating The Archer Trilogy. Inspired by the imperfections of nature, the songs from The Archer Trilogy have been described as atmospheric, hauntingly dark soundscapes. The ethereal music combines sparse experimental charm with an upfront electronic sound.

The first two installments were recorded in Sweden’s wilderness in Elin Lindfors‘ grandmother’s remote log cabin, with no phone lines and a barely working computer. Frequent bursts of rain caused the duo to lose entire works at times, forcing the band to sift through the wreckage, reusing what was left and crafting brand new creations from damaged fragments. Some of the instruments featured include electric guitars, melodica, trumpet, drums, piano, synthesizers, glockenspiel and music-boxes to create a sound of contrasts.

In an effort to make music outside of a traditional studio, the third segment in the trilogy was created and recorded in a disused, haunted pasta factory located in the small Swedish city of Gävle. Finishing touches were written while on tour.

== Members ==
David Lehnberg and Elin Lindfors are the only two consistent pieces in the band. Both are versatile multi-instrumentalists and singers, and handle everything from writing to recording and production.

== Discography ==
=== Albums ===
- Aurora, Despotz Records, 2008
- The Archer Trilogy Pt. 2, The Control Group, 2011
- The Archer Trilogy Pt. 3, The Control Group, 2013
- Undersvik, Lamour Records, 2016

=== EP's ===
- Eggegrund, Despotz Records, 2010
- The Archer Trilogy Pt. 1, The Control Group, 2011
- The Archer, The Control Group, 2012
- Tiger, The Control Group, 2012
- Lazarus, The Control Group, 2013

=== Singles ===
- Prologue, Despotz Records, March 8, 2011
- Fra Ro Raa / Ro Ra Fraa, The Control Group, December 16, 2011

=== Videos ===
- "W"
- “Divine Light”
- “Lazarus”
- “Meant To Be”
- “Ram Ram”
- “Tiger”
- “Fra Ro Raa / Ro Ra Fraa"
