= Hell Is Here (album) =

Studio album by The Crown
- Released: 9 May 1999
- Recorded: August 1998
- Genre: Death metal Thrash metal
- Length: 47:03
- Label: Metal Blade Records

The Crown chronology
Eternal Death (1997)	Hell Is Here (1999)	Deathrace King (2000)

Professional ratings
Review scores
Source	Rating
AllMusic	3/5 stars
Chronicles of Chaos	9/10
Metal.de	8/10
Sputnikmusic	2.5/5 stars

Hell Is Here is the third album by Swedish death/thrash metal band The Crown. It was the first album to be originally released with the name "The Crown" instead of the previous name "Crown of Thorns", changed for legal reasons.

== Track listing ==
1. "The Poison" - 3:17
2. "At the End" - 4:41
3. "1999-Revolution 666" - 5:20
4. "Dying of the Heart" - 5:57
5. "Electric Night" - 2:32
6. "Black Lightning" - 3:25
7. "The Devil and the Darkness" - 4:52
8. "Give You Hell" - 2:53
9. "Body and Soul" - 3:11
10. "Mysterion" - 3:28
11. "Death by My Side" - 7:27
