= Slowmotion Apocalypse =

Italian melodic death metal band

- Origin: Pordenone, Italy
- Genres: Melodic death metal, metalcore
- Years active: since 2002
- Label: Scarlet (since 2005) Tribunal (since 2005) Soundholic (2005)
- Members: Alberto "Albi" Zannier Nicola "Nicolas" Milanese Manuel "Sean" Gianella Ivo Boscariol Tommaso "Tommy" Corte
- Past members: Ivan Odorico

Slowmotion Apocalypse is an Italian melodic death metal band formed in Pordenone in 2002. They released their third album Mothra in October 2009, recorded at Planet Red Studios, Richmond, Virginia, with producer Andreas Magnusson (The Black Dahlia Murder, The Agony Scene, We Were Gentlemen, Dufresne, Oh, Sleeper) and featuring Myke Terry from Bury Your Dead and Matt Rudzinski from Killwhitneydead. At the Gates vocalist Tomas Lindberg provided guest vocals on the song "The Blessing" on their second album, Obsidian, which was produced by Ettore Rigotti and released in 2007.

== Members ==
- Alberto "Albi" Zannier – vocals (since 2002)
- Nicola "Nicolas" Milanese – guitar (since 2002)
- Manuel "Sean" Gianella – guitar (since 2008)
- Ivo Boscariol – bass (since 2002)
- Tommaso "Tommy" Corte – drums (since 2002)

=== Former members ===
- Ivan Odorico – guitar (2002–2008)

== Discography ==
=== Studio albums ===
- My Own Private Armageddon (2005)
- Obsidian (2007)
- Mothra (2009)

=== Demos ===
- Demo 2002 (2002)

=== Music videos ===
- "Insomniac"
- "Fuel for My Hatred"
