= Sweet Vengeance (album) =

- Cover art by Niklas Sundin

Studio album by Nightrage
- Released: 30 June 2003
- Recorded: 2003
- Genre: Melodic death metal
- Length: 41:46
- Label: Century Media
- Producers: Fredrik Nordström; Patrik Sten

Nightrage chronology
Demo 3 (2002)	Sweet Vengeance (2003)	Descent into Chaos (2005)

Sweet Vengeance is the debut full-length studio album by the Greek/Swedish melodic death metal band Nightrage. It was released by Century Media Records on 30 June 2003. Some song titles are shortened versions of ones used for demo versions of their respective songs.

== Critical reception ==
Professional ratings
Review scores
Source	Rating
AllMusic	4/5 stars
Blabbermouth.net	7.5/10
BW&BK	9/10
Rock Hard	8.5/10
Heavymetal.dk	6/10
Noise.fi	4/5 stars
Scream Magazine	4/6 stars

Writing for AllMusic, John Serba said the album was "consistently excellent in both song and performance" and "any fan of the melodic European death metal scene should foam at the mouth upon hearing Nightrage's debut."

Blabbermouth was more critical of the album, calling it an "above average slab of melodic crunch that can at different points be both skilful and disparate." Vampster opined that for an all-star lineup, the album was a little disappointing, with there being too little originality. The songs were "good, but not outstanding". Powermetal.de also called it "solid", but "predictable" given the styles of the other bands the musicians came from.

Laura Taylor for Exclaim! stated that "the band pulls off the stylistic experimentation admirably well" and that it "isn't the straightforward melodic death metal album that the first few tracks might lead you to expect."

== Track listing ==
All tracks are written by Marios Iliopoulos.

No.	Title	Length
1.	"The Tremor"	3:17
2.	"The Glow of the Setting Sun"	4:09
3.	"Hero"	3:57
4.	"Elusive Emotion"	3:45
5.	"Gloomy Daydreams"	4:13
6.	"Macabre Apparition"	3:31
7.	"In My Heart"	3:19
8.	"Ethereal"	4:50
9.	"Circle of Pain"	4:21
10.	"At the Ends of the Earth"	4:34
11.	"The Howls of the Wolves" (Instrumental)	1:42

Japanese releases feature a bonus track, an extended demo version of "Gloomy Daydreams".

== Personnel ==
=== Band members ===
- Tomas Lindberg − vocals
- Marios Iliopoulos − guitars
- Gus G − guitars
- Brice Leclercq − bass

=== Guests ===
- Per Möller Jensen − drums (tracks 1–10) & arrangements
- Fredrik Nordström − keyboards
- Tom S. Englund − clean vocals (tracks 3, 8–10)
