= Remains of a Dead World =

Studio album by Nightrage
- Released: May 31, 2024
- Genre: Melodic death metal
- Length: 41:31
- Label: Despotz Records
- Producer: Fotis Benardo

Nightrage chronology
Abyss Rising (2022)	Remains of a Dead World (2024)

Professional ratings
Review scores
Source	Rating
Rock Hard	7.5/10
Scream Magazine	3/6
Metal Hammer España	Favourable

Remains of a Dead World is the tenth studio album by the melodic death metal band Nightrage, released on May 31, 2024 through Despotz Records. Music videos were released for some tracks including "Persevere Through Adversity". It is their first album with vocalist Konstantinos Togas, and their last album with guitarist Magnus Söderman and drummer George Stamoglou.

== Track listing ==
1. "Euphoria Within Chaos" – 4:33
2. "Persevere Through Adversity" – 4:38
3. "Nocturnal Thorns" – 4:24
4. "A Throne of Melancholy" – 3:58
5. "Dark Light" – 3:50
6. "Echoes of Broken Words" – 3:37
7. "Deadliest Sin" – 4:09
8. "Pierce the Soul" – 3:33
9. "Obey the Hand" – 3:45
10. "Remains of a Dead World" – 4:44

== Personnel ==
- Konstantinos Togas – vocals
- Marios Iliopoulos – guitars, backing vocals
- Magnus Söderman – guitars
- Francisco Escalona – bass
- George Stamoglou – drums
- Fotis Benardo – producer, engineering, mixing
- George Nerantzis – mastering
- Graphic no Jutsu – cover art, layout
