= Wearing a Martyr's Crown =

Studio album by Nightrage
- Released: 22 June 2009
- Recorded: February–March 2009
- Studio: Studio Fredman, Gothenburg, Sweden
- Genre: Melodic death metal
- Length: 51:42
- Label: Lifeforce
- Producer: Fredrik Nordström

Nightrage chronology
A New Disease Is Born (2007)	Wearing a Martyr's Crown (2009)	Insidious (2010)

Professional ratings
Review scores
Source	Rating
laut.de	4/5
Powermetal.de	8/10
Rock Hard	8/10

Wearing a Martyr's Crown is the fourth album by the melodic death metal band Nightrage. The album was released on 22 June 2009 through German label, Lifeforce Records. The European digipak includes a demo version of "Failure of All Human Emotions" as a bonus track. The Japanese version of the album includes a cover of Metallica's "Holier Than Thou." The title for the instrumental Sting Of Remorse was inspired by lyrics from the song Surge Of Pity which appears on the album A New Disease Is Born.

== Track listing ==
No.	Title	Writer(s)	Length
1.	"Shed the Blood"	Iliopoulos/Mörck/Hämäläinen	4:13
2.	"Collision of Fate"	Iliopoulos/Mörck/Hämäläinen	5:13
3.	"A Grim Struggle"	Iliopoulos/Mörck/Hämäläinen	5:03
4.	"Wearing a Martyr's Crown"	Iliopoulos/Mörck/Hämäläinen	4:30
5.	"Among Wolves"	Iliopoulos/Mörck/Hämäläinen	4:29
6.	"Abandon"	Iliopoulos/Mörck/Hämäläinen	4:30
7.	"Futile Tears"	Iliopoulos/Mörck/Hämäläinen	5:18
8.	"Wounded Angels"	Iliopoulos/Mörck/Hämäläinen	4:00
9.	"Mocking Modesty"	Iliopoulos/Mörck/Hämäläinen	4:29
10.	"Failure of All Human Emotions"	Iliopoulos/Mörck/Hämäläinen	4:36
11.	"Sting of Remorse [instrumental]"	Iliopoulos/Mörck	5:21

== Musical appearances ==
- "A Grim Struggle", "Collision of Fate", "Shed the Blood", and "Wearing a Martyr's Crown" were made available as downloadable content for the Rock Band video game series on Xbox. On 30 June 2011 "A Grim Struggle" was made available for download on the PlayStation 3 console.

=== Band members ===
- Antony Hämäläinen – Vocals, Lyrics
- Marios Iliopoulos – Guitar, Music composition, Lyrics
- Olof Mörck – Guitar, Music composition
- Anders Hammer – Bass guitar
- Johan Nunez – Drums

=== Guest musicians ===
- Gus G. – guitar solo on "Sting of Remorse"
- Sakis Tolis – backing vocals on "Mocking Modesty"
- Elias Holmlid – orchestrations and keyboards on "Shed the Blood", "Futile Tears", "Mocking Modesty", and "Sting of Remorse"

=== Production ===
- Fredrik Nordström – Production, Mixing, keyboards on "Abandon"
- Peter In de Betou - Audio Mastering at Tailor Maid Productions
- Henrik Udd – Audio Engineering, Mixing
- Andy Hayball – Assistant Engineer
