= Misanthropic Generation =

Studio album by Disfear
- Released: 12 August 2003
- Recorded: 2002–2003
- Genres: D-beat, death 'n' roll
- Length: 38:07
- Label: Relapse Records
- Producers: Mieszko Talarzyk; Disfear

Disfear chronology
Everyday Slaughter (1997)	Misanthropic Generation (2003)	Live the Storm (2008)

Professional ratings
Review scores
Source	Rating
Allmusic	3/5 stars

Misanthropic Generation is the fifth album by Swedish D-beat band Disfear. It is the first full-length album from the band to feature Tomas Lindberg on vocals.

== Track listing ==
No.	Title	Length
1.	"Powerload"	3:40
2.	"An Arrogant Breed"	3:16
3.	"Misanthropic Generation"	4:14
4.	"Rat Race"	2:38
5.	"The Final of Chapters"	1:50
6.	"Never Gonna Last"	3:29
7.	"Demons, Demons, Demons"	3:37
8.	"26 Years of Nothing"	3:26
9.	"A Thousand Reasons"	2:19
10.	"The Horns"	2:21
11.	"Dead End Lives"	3:30
12.	"Desperation"	3:47
