= Eternal Death =

Studio album by Crown of Thorns
- Released: January 6, 1997
- Recorded: 1996
- Genre: Blackened death metal
- Length: 52:28
- Label: Black Sun
- Producers: Crown of Thorns, Berno Paulsson

Crown of Thorns chronology
| The Burning (1995) | Eternal Death (1997) | Hell Is Here (1999) |

Eternal Death is the second album of Crown of Thorns. It was originally released in 1997 and later re-issued under the band's current name, The Crown. This album is stylistically from the thrash metal-infused sound of the band's later albums, favoring instead a more black metal-oriented sound.

== Reception ==
Professional ratings
Review scores
| Source | Rating |
|---|---|
| AllMusic | 4/5 stars |
| Chronicles of Chaos | 7/10 |
| Metal.de | 9/10 |
| Metal Injection | 8/10 |
| PopMatters | 7/10 stars |
| The Metal Crypt | 4/5 stars |

The album received from 91 to 100 percent approval on Encyclopaedia Metallum.

DemonBit praised the soundtrack as well as the performance saying that "Every performance here is nothing short of impressive." and praising the ensemble members independently: "Janne Saarenpää absolutely pummels his kit in a truly dynamic performance of blast beats, fills and innovative rhythms. Vocalist Johan Lindstrand delivers coarse shrieks under sustained syllables, giving the blasphemous lyrical content some welcomed emotional power. Guitarists Marcus Sunesson and Marko Tervonen provide perhaps the most interesting aspect of the album, with their masterful blend of concise gothenburg-like and Floridian death metal riff fusion."

The re-released version which was published by Dissonance in 2018 received 8.5 out of 10 from Daniel Müller of the Cross Fire.

== Track listing ==
1. "Angels Die" – 4:52 (M. Tervonen, M. Olsfelt)
2. "Beautiful Evil Soul" – 4:10 (M. Olsfelt)
3. "In Bitterness and Sorrow" – 3:34 (M. Tervonen, M. Olsfelt)
4. "The Black Heart" – 8:36 (M. Olsfelt)
5. "World Within" – 5:32 (M. Sunesson, J. Lindstrand, M.Olsfelt)
6. "The Serpent Garden" – 4:50 (M. Tervonen, M. Olsfelt)
7. "Kill the Priest" – 1:46 (M. Olsfelt, R. Österberg)
8. "Misery Speaks" – 4:45 (J. Lindstrand, M. Tervonen)
9. "Hunger" – 4:50 (M. Tervonen, M. Olsfelt)
10. "Death of God" – 10:08 (M. Olsfelt)

== Personnel ==
- Marcus Sunesson – guitar
- Janne Saarenpää – drums
- Magnus Olsfelt – bass guitar
- Johan Lindstrand – vocals
- Marco Tervonen – guitar
- Berno Paulsson – engineer
- Göran Finnberg – mastering
