= The Crown (band) =

Swedish metal band

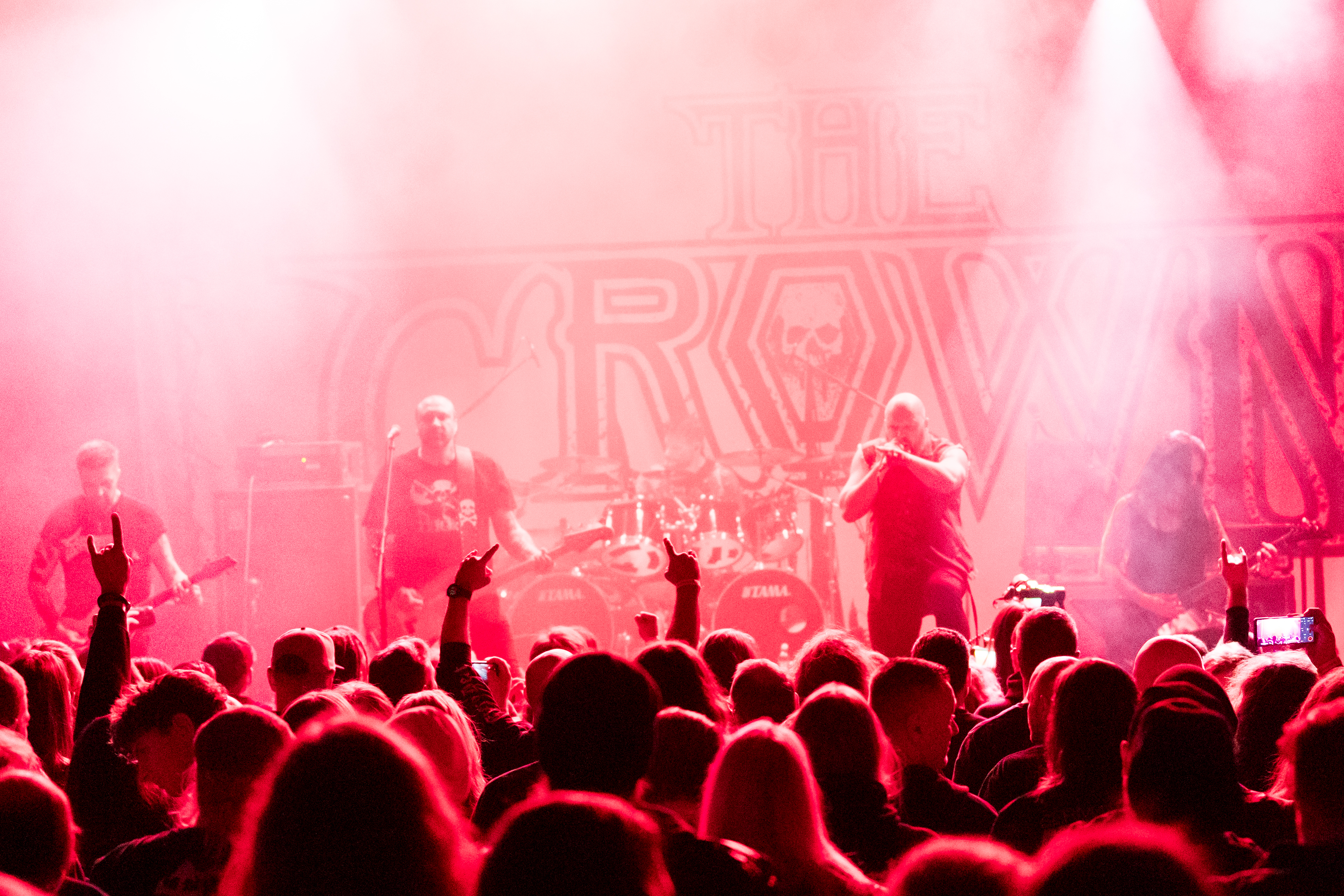
- The Crown at Heidelberg Deathfest 2025

Background information
- Also known as: Crown of Thorns (1990–1998), Dobermann (2008–2009)
- Origin: Trollhättan, Sweden
- Genres: Melodic death metal; thrash metal; death metal
- Years active: 1990–2004; 2009–present
- Labels: Black Sun, Metal Blade, Century Media
- Members: Marko Tervonen; Johan Lindstrand; Robin Sörqvist; Mattias Rasmussen; Mikael Norén
- Past members: Jonas Stålhammar; Tomas Lindberg; Robert Österberg; Marcus Sunesson; Janne Saarenpää; Magnus Olsfelt; Henrik Axelsson
- Website: thecrownofficial.com

The Crown is a Swedish death metal/thrash metal band from Trollhättan, active from 1990 to 2004 and again since 2009.

== History ==
They originally used the name Crown of Thorns but changed it because an American band already had it. Their music and lyrics are inspired by death, antireligious themes (mostly targeting Christianity) and rebellion. They are known to fuse melodic death metal with aggressive old-school death metal and considerable thrash metal reminiscent of Possessed and early Sepultura. The Crown disbanded in 2004. After that, Lindstrand formed One Man Army and the Undead Quartet. Tervonen formed Angel Blake, named after a song by Danzig. Sunesson is in a band called Engel. Olsfelt is in a band called Stolen Policecar. The band reformed in December 2009 with new vocalist Jonas Stålhammar of God Macabre.

On 30 June 2010, it was reported that The Crown signed a worldwide deal with Century Media Records. The band's eighth studio album, Doomsday King, was released in September 2010.

The Crown celebrated their 25th anniversary with the release of their ninth studio album, Death Is Not Dead, on 12 January 2015. First single "Headhunter" was released on 27 October 2014 as well as the music video was made on the same date.

On 28 November 2017, it was announced that The Crown had returned to Metal Blade Records, and released the first single, "Iron Crown", from their then-upcoming tenth studio album Cobra Speed Venom, on 12 January 2018. On that album, The Crown used a string quartet with Alexander Bringsoniou playing violin, viola and cello. Their eleventh studio album, Royal Destroyer, was released 12 March 2021. Their final album, Crown of Thorns, was released on 11 October 2024.

On 1 December 2025, The Crown announced they were disbanding following a farewell tour in 2026, with the final show scheduled on 19 December in Gothenburg.

== Musical style ==
The Crown's music is an aggressive mix of a more melodic version of death metal and thrash metal. Their first demo recording Forever Heaven Gone was described as "truly brutal Swedish death metal that didn't have the typical Swedish sound that bands like Entombed and Dismember were known for." Rather, their aggressive style with heavy riffs and deep powerful vocals was compared to Florida death metal.

The lyrics deal with "diabolical blasphemy, [...] death, darkness, destruction, revolution, war, drugs, sex, black magic and of course rock'n'roll." Jon Kristiansen described The Crown as "a less philosophical, unyielding thrash band". Legacy writer Volkmar Weber described it as surprising "what depth the lyrics have [...] profound inner views and attitudes to life from people who know what they are talking about".

== Members ==
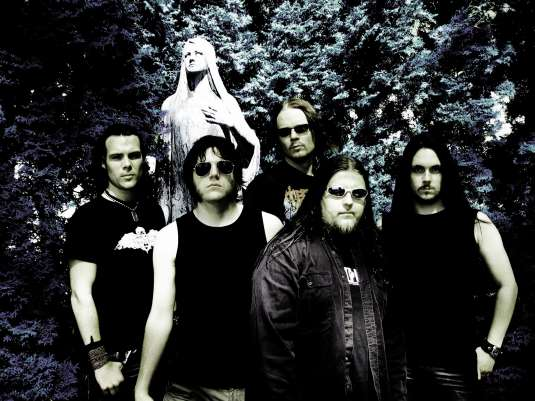
Promotional photo, 2003

Current line

- Charlie Chou–bass (2026–present)
- Marko Tervonen – rhythm guitar (1990–2004, 2009–present)
- Johan Lindstrand – vocals (1990–2001, 2002–2004, 2011–present)
- Marcus Sunesson – lead guitar (1993–2004, 2009–2013, 2024–present)
- Mattias Rasmussen – bass (2022–present)
- Mikael Norén – drums (2022–present)

Former members

- Magnus Olsfelt – bass (1990–2004, 2009–2022)
- Janne Saarenpää – drums (1990–2004, 2009–2014)
- Robert Österberg – lead guitar (1990–1993)
- Tomas Lindberg – vocals (2001–2002; died 2025)
- Jonas Stålhammar – vocals (2009–2011)
- Robin Sörqvist – lead guitar (2013–2024)
- Henrik Axelsson – drums (2014–2022)

Timeline

== Discography ==
=== Albums ===
- The Burning (1995) (as Crown of Thorns)
- Eternal Death (1997) (as Crown of Thorns)
- Hell Is Here (1999)
- Deathrace King (2000)
- Crowned in Terror (2002)
- Possessed 13 (2003)
- Crowned Unholy (2004)
- Doomsday King (2010)
- Death Is Not Dead (2015)
- Cobra Speed Venom (2018)
- Royal Destroyer (2021)
- Crown of Thorns (2024)

=== Demos ===
- Forever Heaven Gone (1993) (as Crown of Thorns)
- Forget the Light (1994) (as Crown of Thorns)

== Videography ==
=== DVDs ===
- The Crown Invades Karlsruhe (2004), pro-shot live show included with Crowned Unholy CD
- 14 Years of No Tomorrow (2006), three DVDs consisting of a documentary and live shows
