= Deathrace King =

Studio album by The Crown
- Released: May 23, 2000
- Recorded: November 3, 1999 – January 4, 2000
- Genre: Death metal, thrash metal
- Length: 49.05
- Label: Metal Blade
- Producer: Fredrik Nordström, The Crown

The Crown chronology
Hell Is Here (1999)	Deathrace King (2000)	Crowned in Terror (2002)

Deathrace King is the fourth album by Swedish death/thrash metal band The Crown.

== Reception ==
Herbert Chwalek of the Power Metal.de said that "The disc is just damn horny from beginning to end and effortlessly blows away most of the oh-so-tough bands."

Professional ratings
Review scores
Source	Rating
AllMusic	2.5/5 stars
Chronicles of Chaos	9.5/10
Metal.de	9/10
Metal Storm	9.2/10
Rock Hard	8.5/10
Sputnikmusic	4/5 stars
The Metal Crypt	4.5/5 stars

== Artist comments ==
In a March 2007 interview, The Crown frontman Johan Lindstrand revealed that Deathrace King was his favourite album amongst The Crown's discography. "The whole album has very intense, good songs", remarked Lindstrand. "There are no ups and downs on that album, but all pure ten pointers every song." Tomas Lindberg appears on Devil Gate Ride and Mika Luttinen from Impaled Nazarene appears on Total Satan.

== Track listing ==
No.	Title	Length
1.	"Deathexplosion"	3:57
2.	"Executioner: Slayer of the Light"	3:45
3.	"Back from the Grave"	3:06
4.	"Devil Gate Ride"	4:10
5.	"Vengeance"	4:45
6.	"Rebel Angel"	4:21
7.	"I Won't Follow"	4:28
8.	"Blitzkrieg Witchcraft"	3:37
9.	"Dead Man's Song"	4:08
10.	"Total Satan"	4:07
11.	"Killing Star (Superbia Luxuria XXX)"	8:37
Total length:		49.05
