= Insidious (soundtrack) =

Film score by Joseph Bishara
- Released: October 11, 2011
- Genre: Film score
- Length: 40:24
- Label: Void Recordings
- Producer: Joseph Bishara

Joseph Bishara chronology
Night of the Demons (2009)	Insidious (2011)	11-11-11 (2011)

Insidious is the soundtrack to the 2010 horror film of the same name, which is the first film in the Insidious film series. The film's musical score is composed by Joseph Bishara, who would become Wan's recurrent collaborator, scoring for The Conjuring Universe and other films in the franchise. The score consists of 26 original tracks and was released by Void Recordings on October 11, 2011, six months after the film's wide theatrical release.

== Development ==
Bishara talked with Wan about using atonal modern classical music for the soundtrack and sent various collections back and forth to help establish a tone. When he first read the script, he created some basic sketches on paper comprising musical ideas and notes. He rented a piano at his own studio with the help of his friend, and recorded most of the music overnight. The bulk of the score was performed by a quartet using violins, viola and cello which were recorded live, and the sampled piano recordings were put together on various instruments. Bishara followed a structural pattern on recording the score:

"The way some of these things were written out, the structured figure is on the paper, but within those figures on paper, while recording we’d explore with the musicians, like, let’s try switching these notes, and you move down to that one, or you take that one, do that one four times, slow down and fade away – whatever it was, there was a whole lot of exploring the musical systems on paper without having it printed, ready to go, start to finish, note one to note ends, go! There were some like that."

The first recording session with the quartet took place before the film began production. Most of the score had been edited and improvised with Wan setting some of his themes as placeholders before editing. He further used plugins running through experimental instruments to manipulate the score. Wan wanted the scare sequences to play silent, but he further wanted an atonal scratchy violin score mixed with "really weird piano bangs" to give the audiences an edge-of-the-seat experience and leave them curious on what just happened in the sequence.

== Track listing ==
No.	Title	Length
1.	"The Insidious Plane"	1:45
2.	"Insidious"	2:10
3.	"Give It Time"	0:56
4.	"Unawakened" (Movement 1)	1:10
5.	"Unawakened" (Movement 2)	1:20
6.	"Voices in the Static"	0:51
7.	"It Said It Was A Visitor"	0:47
8.	"Hallway Twins"	0:26
9.	"Hooves for Feet"	1:12
10.	"The Further"	4:32
11.	"Broken Open"	2:20
12.	"Gas Mask Vision"	1:40
13.	"Muted Whisperings"	1:35
14.	"Leave This Vessel"	1:19
15.	"Night Terror"	2:57
16.	"Bring Him Back"	0:54
17.	"Into the Further"	1:03
18.	"Into the Lair"	1:20
19.	"He's Looking At Us"	1:00
20.	"They're Coming Through"	1:26
21.	"Slithers Into Fog"	1:09
22.	"The Child Awake"	1:07
23.	"A New World"	0:39
24.	"Dark Boundaries Crossed"	1:45
25.	"Void Figure 7"	3:21
26.	"Void Moment Suite"	1:40
Total length:		40:24

== Reception ==
Mike Hale of The New York Times wrote, that Bishara's "almost comically foreboding" score makes up for "pedestrian camerawork". Drew Taylor of IndieWire called it "a complete straight face and loud, stringy jabs on the film’s unsubtle score by Joseph Bishara." Chris Bumbray of JoBlo.com called it "very effective", and Darren Franich of Entertainment Weekly called it "screechy". Ian Buckwalter of DCist called the soundtrack as "a masterpiece of sonic manipulation, instrumental screeches, clangs, and dissonance that make this one of the best horror soundtracks since Kubrick tapped pre-existing work from the likes of Ligeti and Penderecki for The Shining".

== Credits ==
Credits adapted from liner notes:

- Arrangements and conducting – Jeffrey Holmes
- Cello – Richard Dodd
- Additional engineer – Toddy Allen
- Score engineer and mixing – Chris Spilfogel
- Mastering – Tom Baker
- Music By – Joseph Bishara
- Musical assistance – Alisa Burket
- Piano – Saar Hendelman
- Sleeve design – Phantom City Creative
- Strings – The Section Quartet
- Viola – Lauren Chipman, Daphne Chen
- Violin – Eric Gorfain, Melissa Reiner, Daphne Chen
