= Marios Iliopoulos (musician) =

Greek guitarist

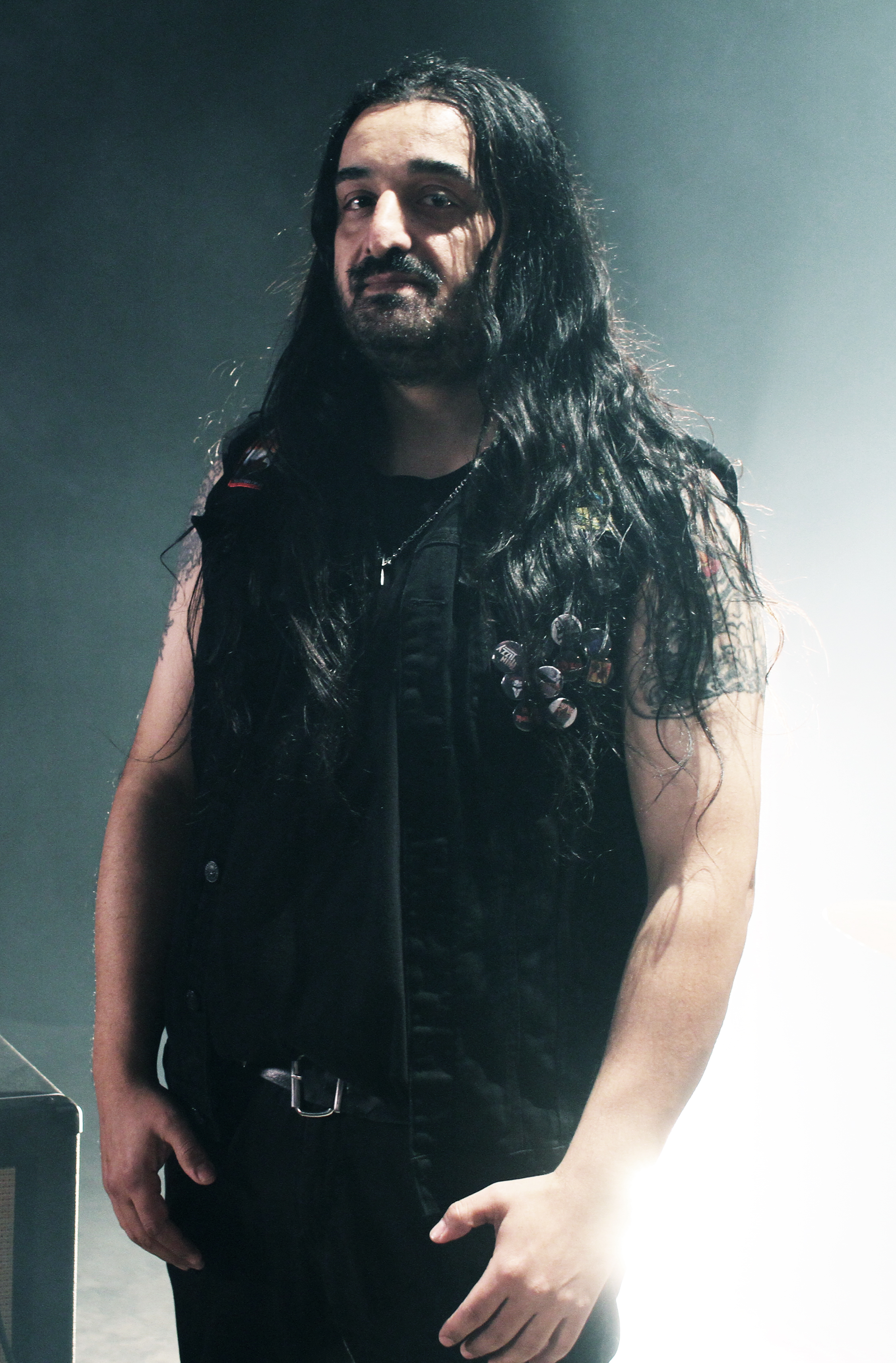

Background information
- Born: 16 December 1969 (age 55)
- Origin: Thessaloniki, Greece
- Genres: Heavy metal, melodic death metal
- Occupation: Musician
- Instrument: Guitar
- Website: nightrage.com

Marios Iliopoulos (born 16 December 1969) is a Greek guitarist and founder of the melodic death metal band Nightrage, and a former member of Exhumation.

After recording three albums with Exhumation (all of them produced in Sweden), Marios formed Nightrage along with fellow Greek guitarist Gus G. Many prominent figures of metal such as Tomas Lindberg, Nick Barker, Tom S. Englund, Mikael Stanne and Per Möller Jensen have collaborated with the band.

Iliopoulos has also made guest solo appearances for various artists, such as Dragonland, Dies Irae, Septic Flesh, Firewind, Mystic Prophecy and Universum. He also helped death metal band The Forsaken out on tour as bass player, and has been on tour with Firewind filling the same position.

== Discography ==
=== Exhumation ===
- Seas of Eternal Silence (1997)
- Dance Across the Past (1998)
- Traumaticon (1999)

=== Nightrage ===
==== Demo albums ====
- Demo (2001)
- Demo 2 (2002)
- Demo 3 (2002)

==== Studio albums ====
- Sweet Vengeance (2003)
- Descent into Chaos (2005)
- A New Disease Is Born (2007)
- Wearing a Martyr's Crown (2009)
- Vengeance Descending (2010)
- Insidious (2011)
- The Puritan (2015)
- The Venomous (2017)
- Wolf to Man (2019)
- Abyss Rising (2022)
- Remains of a Dead World (2024)
