= Armageddon (Swedish band) =

Swedish melodic death metal band

- Origin: Halmstad, Sweden
- Genres: Melodic death metal, thrash metal, power metal, progressive metal
- Years active: 1997–present
- Labels: Listenable, Toy's Factory
- Members: Christopher Amott; Antony Hämäläinen; Joey Concepcion; Andrew Pevny; Márton Veress
- Past members: Jonas Nyrén; Martin Bengtsson; Peter Wildoer; Daniel Erlandsson; Rickard Bengtsson; Dick Lövgren; Tobias Gustafsson; Matt Vicklund; Van Williams; Matt Hallquist; Sara Claudius

Armageddon is a Swedish melodic death metal band led by Christopher Amott of Arch Enemy.

== History ==
Christopher Amott formed Armageddon in Halmstad in 1997. Arch Enemy had been invited to Japan to sign a new record deal with Toy's Factory records after the release of the Black Earth album. In Japan, Amott secured his own record deal for a solo project that became Armageddon. When he returned to Sweden, he recruited drummer Peter Wildoer (Darkane, Majestic), bassist Martin Bengtsson, and vocalist Jonas Nyrén (In Thy Dreams).

The band released their 1997 debut album, Crossing the Rubicon, on the now defunct W.A.R. records in Europe, and on Toy's Factory Records in Japan. Crossing the Rubicon focused on melodic death metal, but incorporated instrumentals and special effects pieces between songs. The album was released by the same label that released Arch Enemy's first album in Europe, but it folded after the release of Rubicon, and the album has become a rare find. To this day, Crossing the Rubicon has never been released outside Europe and Japan.

Following Crossing the Rubicon, Peter Wildoer and Martin Bengtsson joined Arch Enemy, recording and releasing Stigmata in 1998. Amott focused on Arch Enemy for the better part of three years, and did not return to Armageddon until 2000's Embrace the Mystery, released in Japan on Toy's Factory records. The album featured Last Tribe members Rickard Bengtsson on vocals and Dick Lövgren on bass (later of Meshuggah), as well as Arch Enemy's new drummer Daniel Erlandsson (In Flames, Eucharist).

In 2002, Armageddon resurfaced with Three, this time as a three-piece band, and featuring the vocals of Amott and new bassist Tobias Gustafsson (of Eucharist). Almost a pure power metal effort, the album was released by Toy's Factory only in Japan.

On 16 November 2009, Embrace the Mystery and Three were re-released as a 2-CD set with upgraded artwork, bonus tracks and liner notes, on 16 November 2009 in Europe and on 26 January in North America via Century Media Records.

In 2012, Amott quit Arch Enemy and reformed Armageddon, featuring guitarist Matt Vicklund of God Forbid and drummer Van Williams of Nevermore.

In January 2015, the band announced Nightrage vocalist Antony Hämäläinen as their replacement for the recently departed Matt Hallquist.

On 25 May 2016, the band announced via their social media, "We are happy to announce that the next Armageddon release will be a re-recording of the very first Armageddon album from 1997 entitled 'Crossing The Rubicon'. We are excited to share this news with you!"

As Amott was not able to commit time to Armageddon, in 2019, former members Hämäläinen, Concepcion, Claudius, Pevny and drummer Yanni Sofianos have formed Daughter Chaos, intended to be a spiritual successor to Armageddon.

== Band members ==
Current

- Christopher Amott – guitars, vocals (1997-present)
- Joey Concepcion – guitars (2014–present)
- Márton Veress – drums (2014–present)
- Antony Hämäläinen – vocals (2015–present)
- Andrew Pevny – bass (2016–present)

Former

- Jonas Nyrén – vocals (1997)
- Martin Bengtsson – bass (1997)
- Peter Wildoer – drums (1997)
- Rickard Bengtsson – vocals (2000)
- Dick Lövgren – bass (2000)
- Daniel Erlandsson – drums (2000, 2002)
- Tobias Gustafsson – bass (2002)
- Matt Wicklund – guitar (2012–2013)
- Van Williams – drums (2012–2013)
- Matt Hallquist – vocals (2014)
- Sara Claudius – bass (2012–2016)

== Discography ==
Studio albums

- Crossing the Rubicon (1997)
- Embrace the Mystery (2000)
- Three (2002)
- Captivity & Devourment (2015)
- Crossing the Rubicon (Revisited) (2016)
