= Wounded (Landmine Marathon album) =

Studio album by Landmine Marathon
- Released: 2006
- Recorded: April 2006
- Studio: Arcane Digital Recording in Chandler, Arizona
- Genre: Death metal, grindcore
- Length: 23:00
- Label: Level Plane
- Producer: Ryan Butler

Landmine Marathon chronology
2nd Demo (2005)	Wounded (2006)	Landmine Marathon / Scarecrow (2008)

Professional ratings
Review scores
Source	Rating
Blabbermouth.net	(7.5/10)

Wounded is the debut full-length album by Landmine Marathon. Originally released in 2006 via Level Plane Records, the album was re-released on black and clear green 12-inch vinyl in 2011 via Prosthetic Records, in runs of 60 and 14 units respectively.

Shortly after the album's release, Ryan Butler was added to the band as guitarist, replacing the position of Eric Saylor.

== Track listing ==
1. "25th Hour" – 3:35
2. "Crisscross Thoughts" – 4:13
3. "Dying Days" – 2:38
4. "Thunder Blasted Bodies" – 3:13
5. "Muscles Crown" – 2:44
6. "White Widows" – 0:44
7. "Fubar" – 1:26
8. [untitled] – 1:54
9. "Time Movement" – 2:28

== Personnel ==
- Grace Perry – vocals
- Mike Waldron – guitar
- Eric Saylor – guitar
- Matt Martinez – bass guitar and vocals
- Mike Pohlmeier – drums

=== Production and design ===
- Dave Shirk – mastering
- Robb Smigelski – visual layout
- Neal Winter – band photography
