= Insidious (Nightrage album) =

Studio album by Nightrage
- Released: 26 September 2011
- Recorded: December 2010 – June 2011
- Studios: Zero Gravity Studios, Athens, Greece; Arcane Digital Recordings in Chandler, Arizona
- Genre: Melodic death metal
- Length: 57:47
- Label: Lifeforce
- Producer: Nightrage

Nightrage chronology
Wearing a Martyr's Crown (2009)	Insidious (2011)	The Puritan (2015)

Professional ratings
Review scores
Source	Rating
Metal.de	8/10
Metal Hammer	5/7
The Music	3.5/4
Rock Hard	8/10
Heavymetal.dk	8/10

Insidious is the fifth album by the melodic death metal band Nightrage. The album was released on 26 September 2011 in Europe and a day later in North America (27 September) through German label, Lifeforce Records. The Japanese version of the album includes a cover of Def Leppard's "Photograph".

Insidious is the first Nightrage album in the band's history to feature the same line up as the previous album.

== Track listing ==
No.	Title	Writer(s)	Length
1.	"So Far Away (intro)"	Iliopoulos/Baharidis	1:18
2.	"Delirium Of The Fallen"	Iliopoulos/Mörck/Hämäläinen	4:14
3.	"Insidious"	Iliopoulos/Hämäläinen	3:45
4.	"Wrapped In Deceitful Dreams"	Iliopoulos/Hämäläinen	3:52
5.	"Hate Turns Black"	Iliopoulos/Mörck/Hämäläinen	4:32
6.	"Sham Piety"	Iliopoulos/Mörck/Hämäläinen	5:30
7.	"Cloaked In Wolf Skin"	Iliopoulos/Mörck/Hämäläinen	3:22
8.	"This World Is Coming To An End"	Iliopoulos/Hämäläinen	3:26
9.	"Utmost End Of Pain"	Iliopoulos/Mörck/Hämäläinen	4:22
10.	"Poignant Memories"	Iliopoulos/Mörck/Hämäläinen	3:55
11.	"Hush Of Night"	Iliopoulos/Mörck/Hämäläinen	3:37
12.	"Poisoned Pawn"	Iliopoulos/Mörck/Hämäläinen	3:57
13.	"Solar Eclipse (Prelude)"	John K.	0:35
14.	"Solar Corona"	Iliopoulos/Baharidis	5:43
15.	"Emblem Of Light (outro)"	John K.	1:05
16.	"Photograph" (Japanese and Digital edition bonus track; Def Leppard cover)	Clark/Willis/Savage/Lange/Elliott	4:34
Total length:			57:47

== Musical appearances ==
- On 22 March 2012 the title track Insidious was made available as downloadable content for Rock Band 3 on Xbox 360 through Rock Band Network.
- On 26 April 2012, Wrapped In Deceitful Dreams was made available as downloadable content for Rock Band 3 on Xbox 360 through Rock Band Network.
- On 21 June 2012, So Far Away / Delirium Of The Fallen was made available as downloadable content for Rock Band 3 on Xbox 360 through Rock Band Network.

== Personnel ==
Nightrage

- Antony Hämäläinen – vocals
- Marios Iliopoulos – guitar
- Olof Mörck – guitar
- Anders Hammer – bass guitar
- Johan Nunez – drums

Guest musicians

- Tomas Lindberg – guest vocals on "Insidious", "Sham Piety", and "This World Is Coming to an End"
- Gus G. – guitar solos on "Wrapped in Deceitful Dreams" and "Solar Corona"
- Tom S. Englund – clean vocals on "Wrapped in Deceitful Dreams" and "Solar Corona"
- Apollo Papathanasio – clean vocals on "Delirium of the Fallen", "This World Is Coming to an End", and "Photograph"
- Elias Holmlid – strings and piano on "Delirium of the Fallen"
- John K - orchestrations and keyboards on "Solar Eclipse" and "Emblem of Light"
- George Baharidis - orchestrations on "So Far Away" and "Solar Corona"

Production

- Fredrik Nordström – mixing, mastering at Studio Fredman
- Henrik Udd – mixing, editing at Studio Fredman
- Ryan Butler – vocal recordings at Arcane Digital Recordings
- Terry Nikas – drums, guitar, bass recordings at Zero Gravity Studios
