= Crowned in Terror =

Studio album by The Crown
- Released: April 9, 2002
- Recorded: September 2001–January 2002 at Studio Mega
- Genres: Death metal; thrash metal
- Length: 43:04
- Label: Metal Blade
- Producers: Chris Silver, The Crown

The Crown chronology
Deathrace King (2000)	Crowned in Terror (2002)	Possessed 13 (2003)

Professional ratings
Review scores
Source	Rating
AllMusic	3/5 stars
Chronicles of Chaos	9/10
Metal.de	8/10
Metal Storm	9/10
Rock Hard	8.5/10
Sputnikmusic	4.5/5 stars
The Metal Crypt	4.25/5 stars

Crowned in Terror is the fifth album by Swedish death/thrash metal band The Crown. This is one of two albums by The Crown not to have Johan Lindstrand on vocals (although he did some backing vocals on the album). Instead Tomas Lindberg handled the vocal duties. Later, the vocals were re-recorded by Lindstrand and the album was re-released as Crowned Unholy.

On 24 May 2002, the album was ranked an #1 in the Loud Rock section of the CMJ New Music Report magazine.

In 2018, The Crown had announced the re-issue of Crowned in Terror vinyls. The vinyls will be sold as either 180 g black vinyl, amber marbled, clear teal marbled, or bone white marbled in the European Union and as orange-brown marbled vinyl in the United States.

== Track listing ==
No.	Title	Length
1.	"House of Hades (Intro)"	0:55
2.	"Crowned in Terror"	4:48
3.	"Under the Whip"	3:58
4.	"Drugged Unholy"	4:14
5.	"World Below"	5:47
6.	"The Speed of Darkness"	5:01
7.	"Out for Blood"	2:45
8.	"(I Am) Hell"	4:15
9.	"Death Is the Hunter"	4:18
10.	"Satanist"	3:47
11.	"Death Metal Holocaust"	3:16
Total length:		43:04

== Personnel ==
The Crown

- Magnus Olsfelt - bass
- Tomas Lindberg - vocals
- Marcus Sunesson - guitars
- Marko Tervonen - guitars
- Janne Saarenpää -drums
- Dr. Johan Lindstrand - backing vocals on "Death Metal Holocaust"

Production

- M. Engstrom - mixing
- Kenneth Johansson - photography
- Thomas Ewerhard - cover art, layout
- Kenneth Svensson - mastering
- Marcus Sunesson - recording
- Marko Tervonen - recording
- Chris Silver - producer, recording, mixing
- Mark Brand - artwork
