= Tomas Lindberg =

Swedish singer (1972–2025)

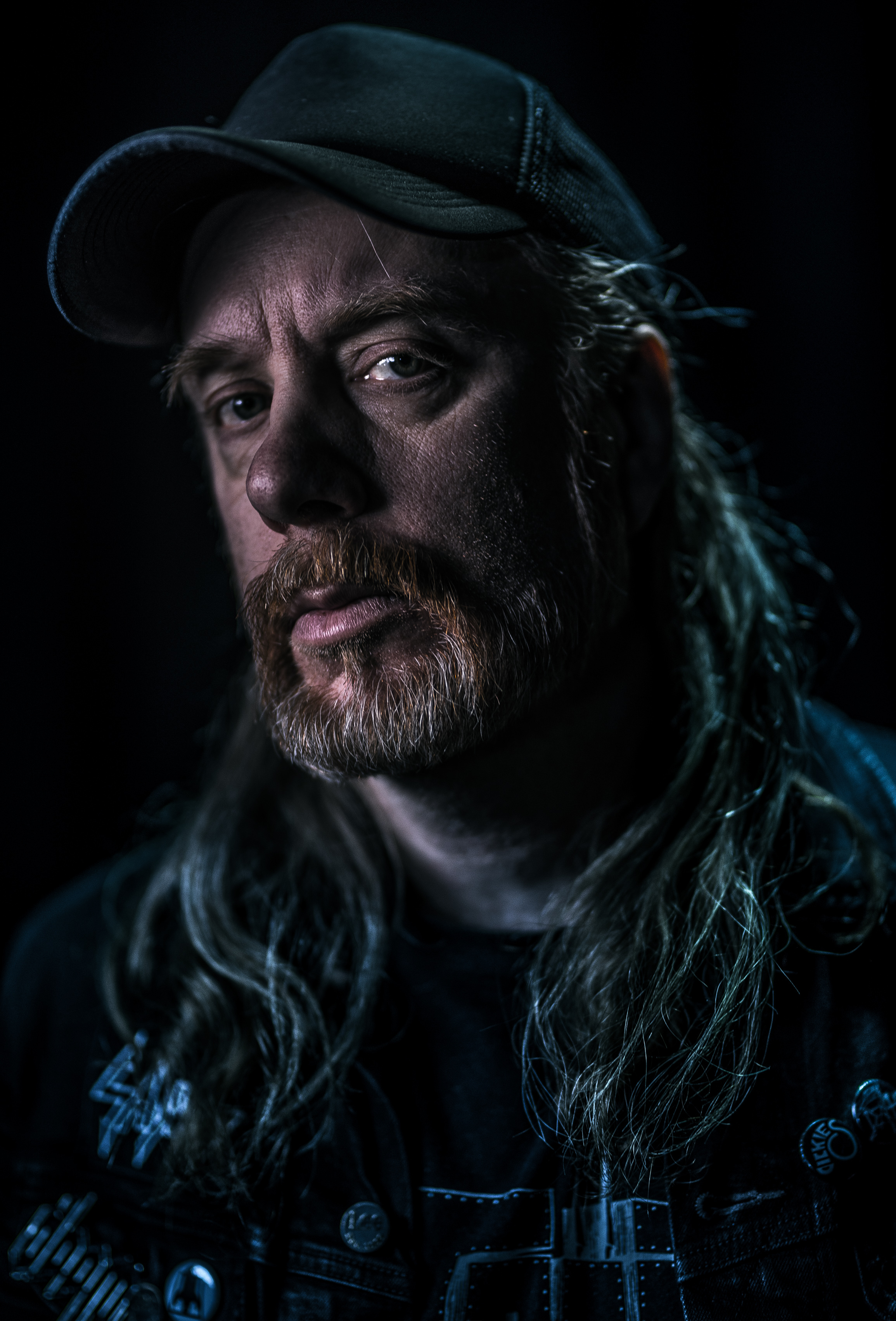
- Lindberg in 2018

Background information
- Also known as: Tompa; Goatspell
- Born: 16 October 1972; Gothenburg, Sweden
- Died: 16 September 2025 (aged 52) Gothenburg, Sweden
- Genres: Death metal; melodic death metal; thrash metal; hardcore punk; crust punk; deathgrind; grindcore; d-beat
- Occupation: Singer
- Years active: 1988–2025
- Formerly of: At the Gates; Nightrage; The Crown; Lock Up; Skitsystem; Grotesque; Disfear; The Great Deceiver; Liers in Wait; Ben-Hur; Conquest; Hide; Infestation; Sign of Cain; Snot Rocket; The Lurking Fear

Tomas "Tompa" Lindberg (16 October 1972 – 16 September 2025), also known as "Goatspell", was a Swedish vocalist who fronted many death metal bands, most notably At the Gates. He was active as a musician and composer since the late 1980s. He also taught social studies.

Lindberg was ranked number 30 out of 50 of The Greatest Metal Frontmen of All Time by Roadrunner Records.

== Career ==
Contemporary musicians have described Lindberg as an early driving force within Gothenburg’s underground metal scene during this period. Lindberg started as a vocalist in the band Grotesque under the name Goatspell. When Grotesque fell apart he started melodic death metal band At the Gates. At the Gates broke up after the 1995 release of the highly acclaimed Slaughter of the Soul album, but reformed in 2007. In 1995 Lindberg provided vocals for three tracks on Ceremonial Oath's Carpet while Anders Fridén (In Flames) provided vocals for the other four tracks.

Lindberg was involved in many other diverse musical projects within the metal and punk scene. He had fronted The Great Deceiver (formerly Hide), Disfear, The Crown, Skitsystem and the grindcore supergroup Lock Up, in which he performed alongside Napalm Death members Shane Embury (bass) and Jesse Pintado (guitar) and former Dimmu Borgir drummer Nick Barker. He also did vocals for the Gothenburg-based Sacrilege GBG on their 1996 European tour due to the difficulty for drummer/vocalist Daniel Svensson (In Flames) to do both.

He earned praise for his Gothenburg-based outfit, The Great Deceiver, far removed from his previous work – a product of the Gothenburg melodic death metal scene mixed with influences from artists such as The Cure and Joy Division.

Later on, he worked with the band Nightrage, but shortly after their second album Descent into Chaos was released in 2005, Lindberg left the band so that a more full-time vocalist (Antony Hämäläinen) could accompany them on tours and studio albums. Lindberg occasionally provided guest vocals as seen on Darkest Hour's "The Sadist Nation", Transistor Transistor's "Young Vampires of New Hampshire" 7", and on Slowmotion Apocalypse's, "The Blessing" on the 2007 'Obsidian' album.

Decibel Magazine credits the logo of black metal band Darkthrone as the work of Lindberg.

Lindberg also pursued a career as a teacher and taught social studies in lower secondary school. He taught for five years without a degree before deciding to finish his diploma.

== Illness and death ==
In August 2025, At the Gates announced on social media that Lindberg had been treated for adenoid cystic carcinoma, which was diagnosed in December 2023. This resulted in him having a big part of the roof of his mouth removed, followed by radiation therapy, and ongoing problems with finding some of the cancer remaining. This was revealed as the reason for the band's continued silence on activity and new album progress. On 16 September 2025, David Isberg (formerly of Opeth) announced on Facebook that Lindberg had died from the disease earlier that day. He was 52.

After his death, several artists paid tribute to Lindberg, including Mikael Åkerfeldt of Opeth and former Lock Up bandmate Shane Embury. Dark Tranquillity played At the Gates' "Blinded by Fear" in the Swedish part of their "Gallery/Character" tour in October 2025.

On 16 October 2025, the day which would have been Lindberg's 53rd birthday, At the Gates posted a link on social media for a fundraiser for Gardens of Grief, a fund set up by the Swedish cancer charity Cancerfonden, with a goal of 250,000 SEK.

A memorial concert was held on 6 December 2025 in Gothenburg, where members of Dark Tranquillity, The Halo Effect, and The Crown performed in celebration of Lindberg's legacy. All tickets proceeds went towards the Gardens of Grief fund.

== Legacy ==
Lindberg has been widely credited as a central figure in the development of the Gothenburg metal scene. Dark Tranquillity frontman Mikael Stanne described him as a unifying presence whose influence extended across bands such as Dark Tranquillity and In Flames, stating that Lindberg played a decisive role in shaping the Gothenburg metal scene.

Stanne recalled that Lindberg played a key role in introducing younger musicians to underground metal through tape trading, fanzines, and local rehearsal spaces, helping to foster a tightly connected community in Gothenburg during the late 1980s and early 1990s. Stanne and other contemporaries have also highlighted Lindberg’s role as a mentor within the local underground scene, noting his involvement in tape trading, fanzine publishing, and introducing younger musicians to extreme metal. This activity helped shape the close-knit nature of the Gothenburg metal community during its formative years.

In 2026, At the Gates announced the album The Ghost of a Future Dead, featuring Lindberg’s final recordings. The band described the release as a tribute fulfilling his wishes for the album’s title, sound, sequencing and artwork.

== Discography ==
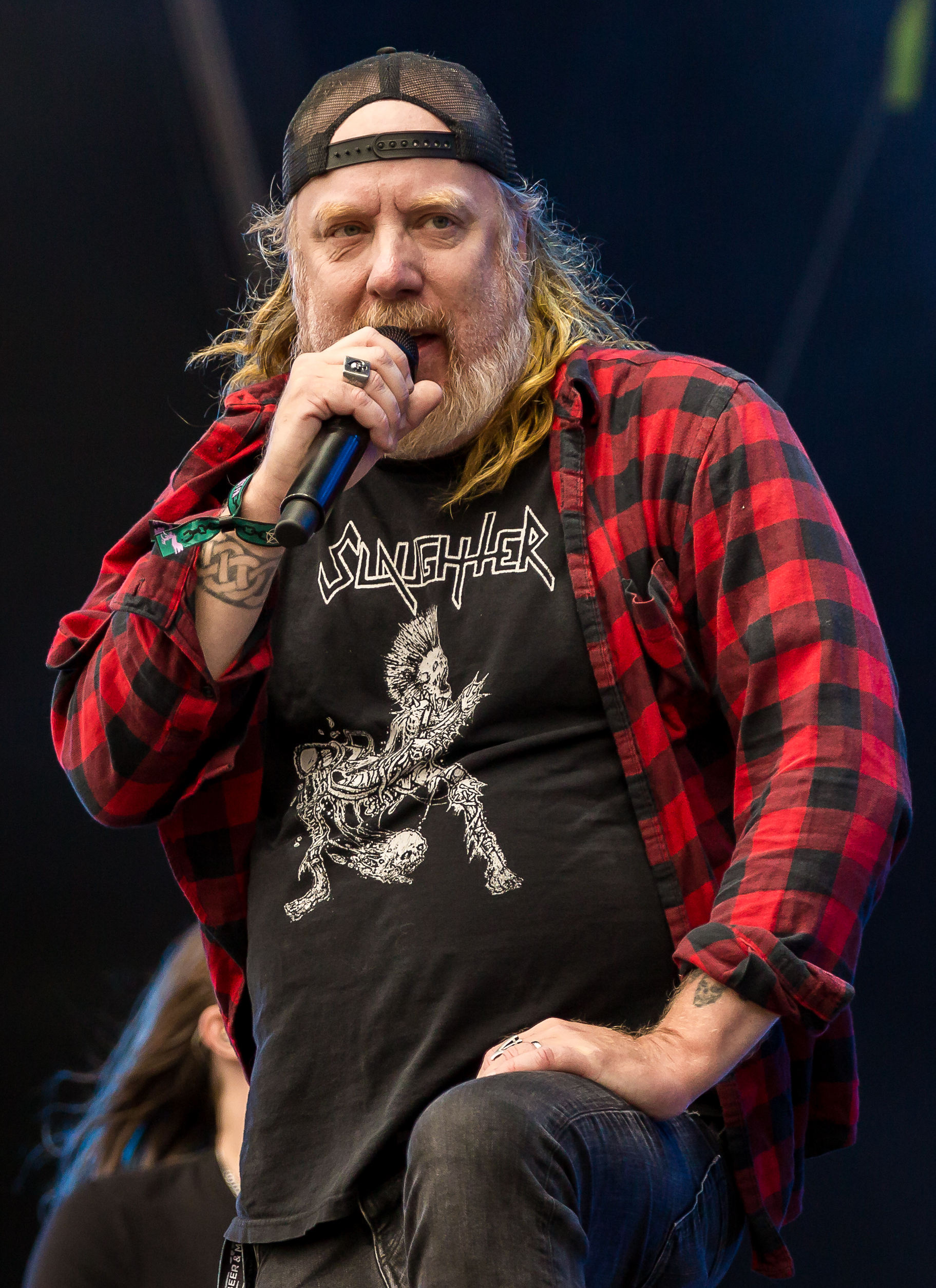
Lindberg with At the Gates in 2022

- Grotesque – In the Embrace of Evil (1989)
- At the Gates – Gardens of Grief (1991)
- At the Gates – The Red in the Sky Is Ours (1992)
- At the Gates – With Fear I Kiss the Burning Darkness (1993)
- At the Gates – Terminal Spirit Disease (1994)
- At the Gates – Slaughter of the Soul (1995)
- At the Gates – At War with Reality (2014)
- At the Gates – To Drink from the Night Itself (2018)
- At the Gates – The Nightmare of Being (2021)
- At the Gates – The Ghost of a Future Dead (2026)
- Skitsystem – Profithysteri (1995)
- Skitsystem – Ondskans ansikte (1996)
- Skitsystem/Wolfpack split – Levande lik (1998)
- Skitsystem – Grå värld/Svarta tankar (1999)
- Guest vocals on Devil Gate Ride on The Crown – Deathrace King (2000)
- The Great Deceiver – Jet Black Art (2000)
- Skitsystem – Enkel tesa till rännstenen (2001)
- Skitsystem – Skitsystem/Nasum Split (2002)
- The Great Deceiver – A Venom Well Designed (2002)
- Lock Up – Hate Breeds Suffering (2002)
- The Crown – Crowned in Terror (2002)
- Disfear – Misanthropic Generation (2003)
- Guest vocals on "Sadist Nation" from Darkest Hour – Hidden Hands of a Sadist Nation (2003)
- Guest vocals on "Dirty Colored Knife and Under the Spell" from Nail Within – self-titled (2003)
- The Great Deceiver – Terra Incognito (2003)
- Nightrage – Sweet Vengeance (2003)
- Guest vocals on "Cancer of the Mind" from Area 54 – Beckoning of the End (2003)
- Nightrage – Descent into Chaos (2005)
- Lock Up – Play Fast or Die: Live in Japan (2005)
- The Great Deceiver – Life Is Wasted on the Living (2007)
- Guest vocals on "The Blessing" from Slowmotion Apocalypse – Obsidian (2007)
- Disfear – Live the Storm (2008)
- Guest vocals on "White Knives" from Transistor Transistor – Young Vampires of New Hampshire 7" (2008)
- Guest vocals on "Ruling Class Cancelled" from Misery Index – Traitors (2008)
- Necronaut – Necronaut Vocals on Rise of the Sentinel (2010)
- Nightrage – Vengeance Descending (2010)
- Guest vocals on "The Mark of the Beast Part 2" from Salem (Israel band) – Playing God and Other Short Stories (2010)
- Lock Up – Necropolis Transparent (2011)
- Nightrage – Guest vocals on Insidious (2011)
- Converge – guest vocals on Converge / Napalm Death (2012)
- The Blood of Heroes – Guest vocals on "The Waking Nightmare" (2013)
- Guest vocal on Solitary Confinement from Decadawn (2014)
- Science Slam Sonic Explorers – guest vocals on Deep Time Predator (with Invertia) (2015)
- City Keys – Guest vocals on "Condemned", from the Evil Greed EP (2017)
- The Lurking Fear – "The Lurking Fear" EP (2017)
- The Lurking Fear – "Out Of The Voiceless Grave" (2017)
- Orphaned Land – Guest vocals on Only the Dead Have Seen the End of War from Unsung Prophets & Dead Messiahs (2018)
- ColdTears – Guest vocals on Silence Them All (2018)
- The Lurking Fear – "Death, Madness, Horror, Decay" (2021)
