= Jonas Nyrén =

Swedish singer

Jonas Nyren is a Swedish metal vocalist. He joined In Thy Dreams in 1996 recording an EP (Stream of Dispraised Souls) and the band's debut album, The Gate of Pleasure, but before the album's release he left the band in 1999. He also recorded the vocals for Armageddon's first album, Crossing The Rubicon.

== Discography ==
=== Armageddon ===
- Crossing The Rubicon (1997)

=== In Thy Dreams ===
- (EP) Stream of Dispraised Souls (1997)
- The Gate of Pleasure (1999)
