= Anders Hammer =

Swedish bassist

- Born: 3 April 1980 (age 45); Gothenburg, Sweden
- Genres: Power metal, melodic death metal
- Occupation: Bassist
- Years active: 2000s–present
- Member of: Dragonland
- Formerly of: Nightrage, Disdain

Anders Hammer (born 3 April 1980) is a Swedish bass guitarist who is a member of the power metal band Dragonland and a former member of the melodic death metal band Nightrage.

== Gear/endorsements ==
ESP Viper Standard series, Warwick Corvette std, Providence cables B-202, Elixir Strings.

== Discography ==
Nightrage

- Wearing a Martyr's Crown (2009)
- Insidious (2011)

Dragonland

- Under the Grey Banner (2011)
