= The Great Deceiver (band) =

Swedish metal band

- Genres: Hardcore punk, metalcore, industrial metal, melodic death metal, groove metal
- Years active: 1998–present
- Labels: Peaceville

The Great Deceiver is a band that featured late At the Gates frontman Tomas Lindberg, formed in 1998. Their music is a mixture of hardcore punk and heavy metal. The band was originally called Hide, and was formed in the week after At the Gates split up. A couple of years later, they changed the name to The Great Deceiver.

== Members ==
=== Current ===
- Matti Lundell (bass)
- Johan Österberg (guitar)
- Ulf Scott (drums)
- Kristian Wåhlin (guitar)

=== Former ===
- Tomas Lindberg (vocals)
- Hans Nilsson (drums)

== Discography ==
- Cave In EP (Bridge, 1999)
- Jet Black Art EP (Trustkill, 2000)
- A Venom Well Designed (Peaceville, 2002)
- Terra Incognito (Peaceville, 2004)
- Life Is Wasted on the Living (Deathwish Inc., 2007)
