= Possessed 13 =

Studio album by The Crown
- Released: 21 October 2003
- Recorded: Studio Fredman, Gothenburg
- Genre: Death metal, thrash metal
- Length: 50.26
- Label: Metal Blade
- Producer: The Crown

The Crown chronology
Crowned in Terror (2002)	Possessed 13 (2003)	Crowned Unholy (2004)

Professional ratings
Review scores
Source	Rating
AllMusic	4/5 stars
Brave Words & Bloody Knuckles	8/10
Chronicles of Chaos	9/10
Metal.de	8/10
Metal Storm	9/10
Sputnikmusic	4.5/5 stars

Possessed 13 is the sixth album by Swedish death metal/thrash metal metal band The Crown.

Henri Kramer of Power Metal.de had praised the album cover and also praised its division in three parts. "Initiation" track 1-5, "Exaltation" track 6-10 and "Annahilation" track 11-13.

In 2018, The Crown had announced the re-issue of Possessed 13 vinyls. The vinyls will be sold as either 180 g black vinyl, cool grey marbled, red with black marbled, or smoke clear vinyl in the European Union and white with red marbled vinyl in the United States.

== Track listing ==
1. "No Tomorrow" − 3:51
2. "Face of Destruction – Deep Hit of Death" − 2:59
3. "Deliverance" – 4:38
4. "Cold Is the Grave" − 4:07
5. "Dream Bloody Hell (Instrumental)" − 3:33
6. "Morningstar Rising" − 3:35
7. "Are You Morbid?" − 3:33
8. "Bow to None" − 4:16
9. "Kill 'Em All" − 4:45
10. "Natashead Overdrive" − 3:41
11. "Zombiefied!" − 2:35
12. "Dawn of Emptiness" − 6:03
13. "In Memoriam" (Instrumental) − 2:50

=== Deluxe edition bonus CD ===
The "Deluxe Version" of the album came with an extra CD entitled "Bonus 13", which consisted of all tracks from both of the band's demos, plus some previously unreleased tracks.

1. "Last Rite" − 3:03 (The Crown's first "pro" recording – 1992)

Forever Heaven Gone demo:

2. "Seventh Gate" − 1:43
2. "Deadspawn" − 2:20
1. "Diachronic Damnation" − 3:21
2. "The Lord of the Rings" − 4:05
3. "Beyond Where Darkness Dwells" − 4:06
4. "Forever Heaven Gone" − 3:19

Forget the Light demo:

8. "Soulicide Demon-Might" − 2:48
8. "Godless" − 4:01
1. "Neverending Dream" − 4:14
2. "Candles" − 6:39

Also includes:

12. "Burnin' Leather" (Bathory cover) − 3:46
12. "Rebel Angel" [demo] − 3:25

=== Special Edition ===
The Special Edition of the CD which came out in 2003 was 97.30 long and was ranked 4.75 out of 5 by The Metal Crypt.
