= Despotz Records =

Swedish record label

- Status: Active
- Genre: Pop, heavy metal, electronic
- Country of origin: Sweden
- Location: Idungatan 8, Stockholm
- Official website: despotz.se

Despotz Records is a Swedish independent record label based in Stockholm. A wide variety of artists are currently affiliated with the label, including Nightrage, Titiyo, and the Deer Tracks. In 2016, Despotz Records was one of the 21 labels nominated for the IMPALA FiveUnderFifteen campaign shining a light on Europe's most inspiring young labels. The label received the IMPALA Young Label Spotlight Award.
