= Nightrage =

Greek/Swedish melodic death metal band

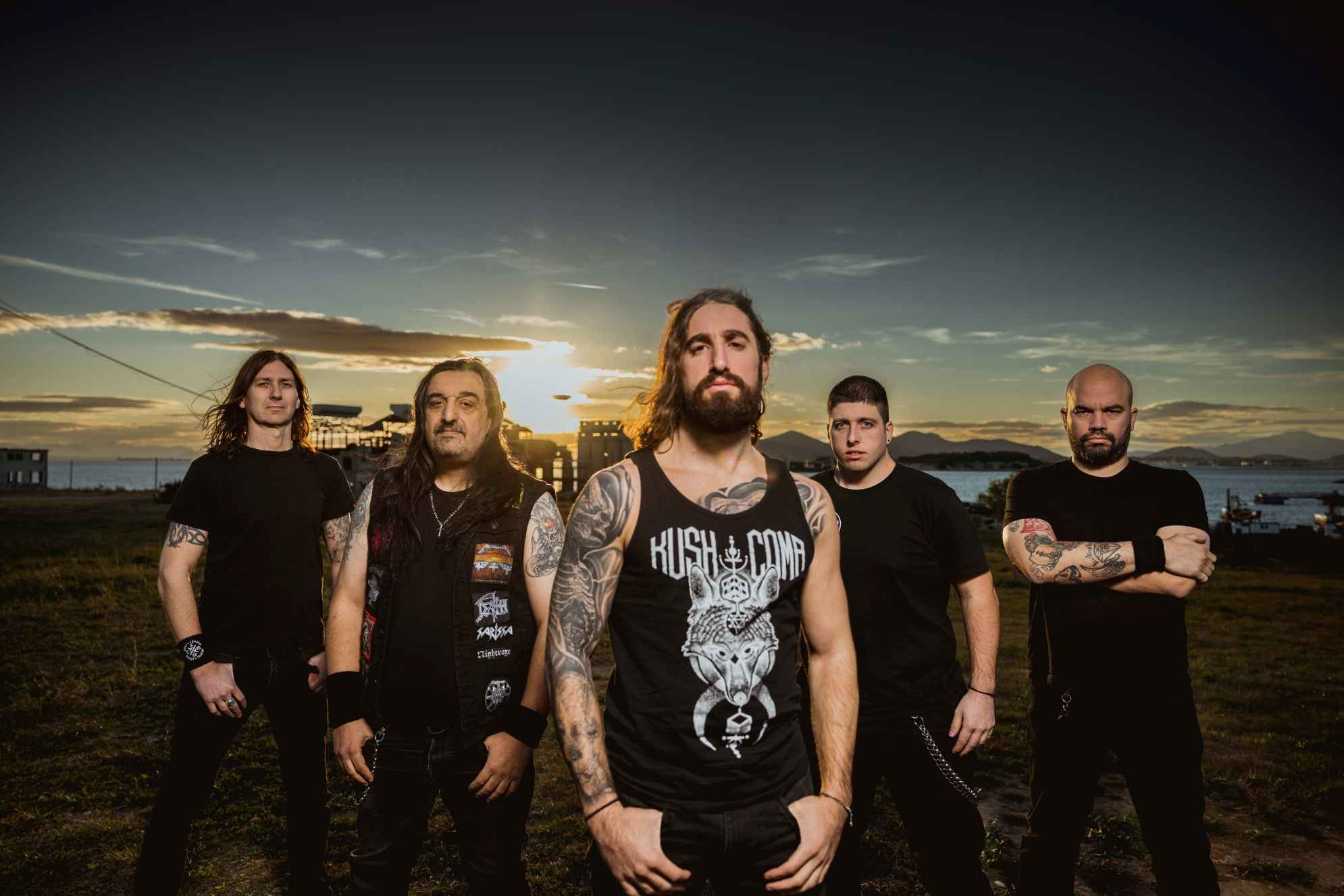
- Nightrage in 2024. From left to right: Magnus Söderman, Marios Iliopoulos, Konstantinos Togas, George Stamoglou, Francisco Escalona

Background information
- Origin: Thessaloniki, Greece; Gothenburg, Sweden
- Genre: Melodic death metal
- Years active: 2000–present
- Labels: Century Media, Lifeforce, Despotz
- Members: Marios Iliopoulos; Kostas A Fotis Benardo; Kostantinos Togas; Francisco Escalona
- Website: nightrage.com

Nightrage is a Greek/Swedish melodic death metal band from Thessaloniki. They later re-located to Gothenburg, Sweden.

== History ==
=== Formation and Sweet Vengeance (2000–2003) ===
Marios Iliopoulos and Gus G founded Nightrage in June 2000. They made three demos from 2001 to 2002.

Their debut album, Sweet Vengeance, was released in 2003, and featured drummer Per Möller Jensen (The Haunted) and bassist Brice Leclercq. They also enlisted vocalist Tomas Lindberg (ex At the Gates). Sweet Vengeance featured guest clean vocals by Tom S. Englund of Evergrey on a few tracks. The album was proceeded by their first video for the track "Gloomy Daydreams" on an earlier edit, with Gus G. on vocals.

=== Descent into Chaos and departure of Lindberg & Gus G (2004–2006) ===
Their second release, Descent into Chaos, was released in 2005 and had a more permanent rhythm section. Fotis Benardo (Septic Flesh, ex-Innerwish) took over on drums and Henric Carlsson, who plays in the band Cipher System, on bass. Mikael Stanne, of Dark Tranquillity, provided a clean vocal section on "Frozen". Tomas Lindberg left the band so that a more full-time vocalist could accompany them on tours and studio albums.

When Gus G was performing with Arch Enemy at Ozzfest 2005, he was replaced with Pierre Lysell for Nightrage's tours. For some of Nightrage's tour in support of Bolt Thrower, Gus G was again unavailable and his place was taken by Christian Muenzer, of Necrophagist. In March 2006, Gus G. permanently left Nightrage to focus on Firewind (later, in 2009, he became the guitarist for Ozzy Osbourne). At this time, Benardo left Nightrage to focus on the reunited Septic Flesh. Alex Svenningson replaced him.

=== A New Disease Is Born (2007–2008) ===
Their third release, A New Disease Is Born, was released in 2007. Gus G. was replaced with Dragonland/Amaranthe guitarist Olof Mörck. The song "Scathing" was chosen for the band's second video, directed by Bob Katsionis.

After the release of A New Disease Is Born, Alex Svenningson and Jimmie Strimell left to form melodic metalcore band Dead by April. Longtime bassist Henric Karlsson left the band due to family obligations.

=== Wearing a Martyr's Crown and Vengeance Descending (2009–2010) ===
Vocalist Antony Hämäläinen, bassist Anders Hammer, and drummer Johan Nunez joined the band in the summer of 2007. Their fourth album, Wearing a Martyr's Crown, was recorded, produced, and mixed by Fredrik Nordström at Studio Fredman for a 2009 release date.

On 18 February 2010, Nightrage released their third music video for the song "Wearing a Martyr's Crown." Bob Katsionis directed the video.

"A Grim Struggle", "Collision of Fate", "Shed the Blood", and "Wearing a Martyr's Crown" were available as downloadable content for the Rock Band video game series on Xbox. On 30 June 2011, "A Grim Struggle" was available for download on the PlayStation 3 console.

Vengeance Descending is a double CD reissue of albums Sweet Vengeance and Descent into Chaos. The first disc features the bonus track "Gloomy Daydreams", and the second one features "Black Skies", also a bonus track. Both tracks were previously only available in Japanese releases.

=== Insidious and World Tour (2011–2012) ===
It was announced via Blabbermouth.net that former At the Gates and Nightrage vocalist Tomas Lindberg would guest vocals for the album, Insidious. A short video clip of the session was posted to YouTube. Other guests set to appear on the album were Gus G, Tom Englund, Apollo Papathanasio and John K. Insidious was the first album since Sweet Vengeance to feature the original line up.

Antony Hämäläinen spoke briefly about the album's direction in a 2013 interview with Deathmetalbaboon.com, "It sounds really heavy. Stripped down and in your face. The songs are a bit shorter and with fewer acoustic guitars than Wearing a Martyr's Crown. It's a very pissed off sound, so it's going to be a really heavy record. Lots of guitar solos and melodies there too of course." The album release dates were 26 September 2011 in Europe and 11 October 2011 in North America.

On 23 March, title track "Insidious" was available as downloadable content for the Rock Band video game series on Xbox.

On 21 May, the band released a video for the track "Delirium of the Fallen". The video was shot on 28 April at the Eightball Club in Thessaloniki, Greece. Gabriel Psaltakis directed the video.

Starting on 9 October 2011, the band supported the album on a North American tour with Firewind and Arsis, titled "Frets of Fury".

In late April 2012, a tour of Europe alongside Demon Hunter and Deadlock was scheduled.

August 2012 was the first time the band played in Asia, headlining the Daejeon Metal Festival in South Korea.

Announced in April 2013, the band would headline a tour of Japan for the first time in their career. The tour began on 5 November and was titled Extreme Metal over Japan. Support for the six date trek came from the Australian technical death metal band Psycroptic, American technical death band The Faceless and French deathcore act In Arkadia.

Olof Mörck has not been part of a live performance or band photography since 2011. It is assumed he has left the band to focus on his main project Amaranthe.

=== New members and releases (2013–present) ===
In 2013, Antony Hämäläinen officially left the band to pursue other musical ventures. Singer Ronnie Nyman was recruited to replace Hämäläinen. With Nyman, the band released their sixth studio album, The Puritan, in 2015.

In July 2016, Magnus Söderman (guitars), Francisco Escalona (bass), and Lawrence Dinamarca (drums) were announced as members of Nightrage. The band recorded and released their seventh studio album, The Venomous, in 2017. Their next album, Wolf to Man, was released on 29 March 2019. Their ninth studio album, Abyss Rising, was released on 22 February 2022.

On 30 June 2023, Nightrage announced on their Facebook and Instagram pages that Nyman would leave the band to focus on his other musical project, "Offerblod", and that singer Jimmie Strimell would rejoin the band. He was replaced with Konstantinos Togas. The band began recording their tenth studio album on 28 October 2023.

On 8 March 2024, the band announced their upcoming album, Remains of a Dead World, would be released on 31 May.

== Band members ==
Current

- Marios Iliopoulos – guitar (2000–present), clean vocals, bass (2000–2003)
- Francisco Escalona – bass guitar (2016–present)
- Fotis Benardo – drums (2004–2006, 2024–present)
- Konstantinos Togas – vocals (2023-present)
- Kostas A. – guitars (2025–present)

Former

- Gus G – guitar (2000–2006), vocals, drum machine (2000–2003)
- Jimmie Strimell – vocals (2005-2007, 2023)
- Brice LeClercq – bass guitar (2003–2004)
- Tomas Lindberg – vocals (2003–2005; died 2025)
- Henric Karlsson – bass guitar (2004–2007)
- Alex Svenningson – drums (2006–2007)
- Olof Mörck – guitar (2006–2011)
- Antony Hämäläinen – vocals (2007–2013)
- Anders Hammer – bass guitar (2007–2016)
- Johan Nunez – drums (2007–2016)
- Lawrence Dinamarca – drums (2016–2018)
- Ronnie Nyman – vocals (2013–2023)
- George Stamoglou – drums (2018–2024)
- Magnus Söderman – guitars (2016–2025)

Session

- Per Möller Jensen – session drums (2003)
- Chris Barkensjö – session drums (2014–present)

Touring

- Nick Barker – drums (2004)
- Pierre Lysell – guitar (2006)
- Christian Münzner – guitar (2006)
- Esben Elnegaard Kjær Hansen – vocals (2007)
- Johnny Haven – vocals (2007)
- Constantine – guitar (2007)
- Morten Løwe Sørensen – drums (2007)
- Bill Hudson – guitar (2012)
- Christopher Jon – guitar (2012)
- Conny Pettersson – drums (2012)
- Jesper Strömblad – guitar (2013–2014)
- Marcus Rosell – drums (2013-2014)

Guests

- Fredrik Nordström – keyboards (on Sweet Vengeance, Descent into Chaos, Wearing a Martyr's Crown)
- Tom S. Englund – clean vocals (on Sweet Vengeance, Insidious)
- Mikael Stanne – clean vocals (on Descent into Chaos)
- Jacob Hansen – guitar solo (on A New Disease Is Born)
- Gus G – guitar solo (on Wearing a Martyr's Crown, Insidious)
- Sakis Tolis – backing vocals (on Wearing a Martyr's Crown)
- Elias Holmlid – keyboards (on Wearing a Martyr's Crown, Insidious)
- Tomas Lindberg – guest vocals (on Insidious)
- Apollo Papathanasio – clean vocals (on Insidious)
- John K – orchestrations and keyboards (on Insidious)
- George Baharidis – orchestrations (on Insidious)

== Discography ==
=== Studio albums ===
- Sweet Vengeance (2003)
- Descent into Chaos (2005)
- A New Disease Is Born (2007)
- Wearing a Martyr's Crown (2009)
- Insidious (2011)
- The Puritan (2015)
- The Venomous (2017)
- Wolf to Man (2019)
- Abyss Rising (2022)
- Remains of a Dead World (2024)

=== Demo albums ===
- Demo (2000)
- Demo 2 (2001, 2020 (as an official compilation))
- Demo 3 (2002)

=== Compilation albums ===
- Vengeance Descending (2010)
