= Carcass discography =

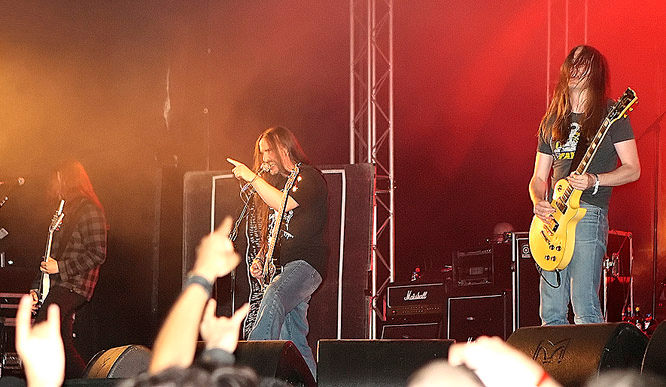
- Carcass in 2010
- Studio albums: 7
- EPs: 5
- Compilation albums: 2
- Video albums: 1
- Music videos: 7
- Demo albums: 2

This is a comprehensive discography of Carcass, an extreme metal band from England, who formed in 1985 and disbanded in 1996. The band reformed in 2007 without one of its original members, drummer Ken Owen, for health reasons. To date, the band have released seven studio albums, two compilation albums, five EPs, two demo albums, one video album, and seven music videos.

== Studio albums ==
Title	Album details	Peak chart positions										Sales
Title	Album details	UK	AUT	FIN	FRA	GER	JPN	NLD	SWE	SWI	US	Sales
Reek of Putrefaction	Released: 7 July 1988; Label: Earache; Formats: CD, CS, LP, DL	—	—	—	—	—	—	—	—	—	—	
Symphonies of Sickness	Released: 4 December 1989; Label: Earache; Formats: CD, CS, LP, DL	—	—	—	—	—	—	—	—	—	—	
Necroticism – Descanting the Insalubrious	Released: 30 October 1991; Label: Earache; Formats: CD, CS, LP, DL	—	—	—	—	—	—	—	—	—	—	
Heartwork	Released: 18 October 1993; Label: Earache; Formats: CD, CS, LP, DL	67	—	—	—	—	222	—	—	—	—	UK: 10,000; US: 64,366
Swansong	Released: 10 June 1996; Label: Earache; Formats: CD, CS, LP, DL	68	—	33	—	—	72	—	—	—	—	US: 22,868
Surgical Steel	Released: 13 September 2013; Label: Nuclear Blast; Formats: CD, LP, DL	47	24	6	82	10	36	73	42	44	41	US: 8,500
Torn Arteries	Released: 17 September 2021; Label: Nuclear Blast; Formats: CD, LP, DL	62	12	7	—	9	29	—	—	19	—	
.

== Compilation albums ==
Title	Album details
Wake Up and Smell the... Carcass	Released: 12 November 1996; Label: Earache; Formats: CD, CS, DL
Choice Cuts	Released: 24 May 2004; Label: Earache; Formats: CD, DL

== EPs ==
Title	Album details
The Peel Sessions	Released: 2 December 1989; Label: Strange Fruit; Formats: CD, CS, LP
Tools of the Trade	Released: 23 June 1992; Label: Earache; Formats: CD, CS, LP, DL
The Heartwork EP	Released: September 1993; Label: Earache; Formats: CD, LP, DL
Surgical Remission/Surplus Steel	Released: 11 November 2014; Label: Nuclear Blast; Formats: CD, LP, DL
Despicable	Released: 30 October 2020; Label: Nuclear Blast; Formats: CD, LP

== Demo albums ==
Title	Album details
Flesh Ripping Sonic Torment	Released: 4 April 1987; Label: Self-released; Formats: CS
Symphonies of Sickness	Released: December 1988; Label: Earache; Formats: CS

== Video albums ==
Title	Album details
Wake Up and Smell the... Carcass	Released: 26 November 1996; Label: Earache; Formats: VHS, DVD

== Music videos ==
Year	Title	Directed	Album
1991	"Corporal Jigsore Quandary"	Howard Garfield	Necroticism: Descanting the Insalubrious
1991	"Incarnated Solvent Abuse"	Steve Mallet	Necroticism: Descanting the Insalubrious
1993	"Heartwork"	Tony Kunewalder	Heartwork
1993	"No Love Lost"	John Moule	Heartwork
1995	"Keep on Rotting in the Free World"	Jan Russell	Swansong
2013	"Unfit for Human Consumption"		Surgical Steel
2014	"The Granulating Dark Satanic Mills"	Kazuaki Kimura & Glenn Maguire	Surgical Steel
2020	"The Living Dead At The Manchester Morgue"		Despicable
2021	"Dance of Ixtab (Psychopomp & Circumstance March No. 1)"	Chioreanu Costin	Torn Arteries
2021	"The Scythe's Remorseless Swing"	Chris Marley	Torn Arteries
