= Choice Cuts (Carcass album) =

Compilation album by Carcass
- Released: 2004
- Recorded: 1998
- Genre: Death metal; deathgrind; goregrind
- Length: 78:57
- Label: Earache
- Producer: Colin Richardson

Carcass chronology
Wake Up and Smell the... Carcass (1996)	Choice Cuts (2004)	Surgical Steel (2013)

Professional ratings
Review scores
Source	Rating
Allmusic	4.5/5 stars

Choice Cuts is a compilation by British extreme metal band Carcass. It was released in 2004.

== Track listing ==
1. "Genital Grinder"
2. "Maggot Colony"
3. "Exhume to Consume"
4. "Swarming Vulgar Mass of Infected Virulency"
5. "Tools of the Trade"
6. "Corporal Jigsore Quandary"
7. "Incarnate Solvent Abuse"
8. "Buried Dreams"
9. "No Love Lost"
10. "Heartwork"
11. "Keep on Rotting in the Free World"
12. "Rock the Vote"
13. "This Is Your Life"
14. "Crepitating Bowel Erosion"
15. "Slash Dementia"
16. "Cadaveric Incubator of Endoparasites"
17. "Reek of Putrefaction"
18. "Empathological Necroticism"
19. "Foeticide"
20. "Fermanting Innerds"
21. "Exhume to Consume"

=== Track origins ===
- Tracks 1–2 are taken from Reek of Putrefaction.
- Tracks 3–4 are taken from Symphonies of Sickness.
- Track 5 is taken from Tools of the Trade.
- Tracks 6–7 are taken from Necroticism – Descanting the Insalubrious.
- Tracks 8–10 are taken from Heartwork.
- Tracks 11–12 are taken from Swansong.
- Track 13 is taken from The Heartwork EP.
- Tracks 14–21 are songs recorded by John Peel of BBC Radio in 1989 and 1990.
