= Wake Up and Smell the... Carcass =

Compilation album by Carcass
- Released: 12 November 1996
- Recorded: February 1989–April 1995
- Genre: Death metal; grindcore
- Length: 75:52
- Label: Earache
- Producer: Colin Richardson, Tony Wilson, Carcass

Carcass chronology
| Swansong (1996) | Wake Up and Smell the... Carcass (1996) | Choice Cuts (2004) |

Professional ratings
Review scores
| Source | Rating |
|---|---|
| AllMusic | 3/5 stars |
| Collector's Guide to Heavy Metal | 8/10 |
| The Quietus | Favorable |

Wake Up and Smell the... Carcass is a compilation album by the band Carcass, and is also the name of a video/DVD compilation of the band's songs. The cover is a photo of John F. Kennedy's autopsy.

== Track listing ==
All lyrics are written by Jeffrey Walker, except where noted; all music is composed by Bill Steer, except where noted.

CD
| No. | Title | Taken from | Length |
|---|---|---|---|
| 1. | "Edge of Darkness" (Unreleased track) | Swansong sessions | 6:08 |
| 2. | "Emotional Flatline" (Unreleased track) | Swansong sessions | 4:15 |
| 3. | "Ever Increasing Circles" (Unreleased track, music by Steer, Carlo Regadas) | Swansong sessions | 4:05 |
| 4. | "Blood Spattered Banner" (Unreleased track) | Swansong sessions | 4:41 |
| 5. | "I Told You So (Corporate Rock Really Does Suck)" (Unreleased track) | Swansong sessions | 3:50 |
| 6. | "Buried Dreams" (Unreleased version) | Radio 1 Rock Show session | 4:05 |
| 7. | "No Love Lost" (Unreleased version, intro music by Ken Owen) | Radio 1 Rock Show session | 4:51 |
| 8. | "Rot 'n' Roll" (Unreleased version) | Radio 1 Rock Show session | 3:44 |
| 9. | "Edge of Darkness" (Unreleased version) | Radio 1 Rock Show session | 5:48 |
| 10. | "This is Your Life" | The Heartwork EP | 4:08 |
| 11. | "Rot 'n' Roll" | The Heartwork EP | 3:49 |
| 12. | "Tools of the Trade" (Music by Steer, Michael Amott) | Tools of the Trade | 3:05 |
| 13. | "Pyosisified (Still Rotten to the Gore)" (Lyrics and music by Walker, Steer) | Tools of the Trade | 3:09 |
| 14. | "Hepatic Tissue Fermentation II" | Tools of the Trade | 6:38 |
| 15. | "Genital Grinder II" | Pathological compilation | 3:00 |
| 16. | "Hepatic Tissue Fermentation" (Music by Owen, Walker, Steer) | Pathological compilation | 6:11 |
| 17. | "Exhume to Consume" (Music by Owen) | Grindcrusher compilation | 4:18 |

DVD
| No. | Title | Length |
|---|---|---|
| 1. | "Heartwork" |
| 2. | "Corporeal Jigsore Quandary" |
| 3. | "Keep on Rotting in the Free World" |
| 4. | "Incarnated Solvent Abuse" |
| 5. | "No Love Lost" |
| 6. | "Inpropagation" |
| 7. | "Corporeal Jigsore Quandary" |
| 8. | "Reek of Putrefaction" |
| 9. | "Pedigree Butchery" |
| 10. | "Incarnated Solvent Abuse" |
| 11. | "Carneous Cacoffiny" |
| 12. | "Lavaging Expectorate of Lysergide Composition" |
| 13. | "Exhume to Consume" |
| 14. | "Tools of the Trade" |
| 15. | "Ruptured in Purulence" |
| 16. | "Genital Grinder II" |
| 17. | "Exhume to Consume" |
| 18. | "Excoriating Abdominal Emanation" |
| 19. | "Ruptured in Purulence" |
| 20. | "Empathological Necroticism" |
| 21. | "Embryonic Necropsy and Devourment" |
| 22. | "Reek of Putrefaction" |

Tracks 1–5 are the band's promo videos, 6–15 were recorded live in 1992 on the "Gods of Grind" tour, and 16–22 were recorded in 1989 on the "Grindcrusher Tour".

== Personnel ==
=== Carcass ===
- Jeffrey Walker – bass, vocals
- Bill Steer – guitars, vocals (12–14, 16–17)
- Michael Amott – guitars (12–13)
- Carlo Regadas – guitars (1–9)
- Ken Owen – drums, backing vocals (12, 14–17)

=== Technical personnel ===
- Colin Richardson – production (1–5, 12–14), mixing (10–11)
- Stephen Harris – engineering (1–5)
- Nick Brine – assistant engineering (1–5)
- Barney Herbert – assistant engineering (1–5)
- Jim Brumby – assistant engineering (1–5)
- Tony Wilson – production (6–9)
- Ted De Bono – engineering (6–9)
- Ken Nelson – engineering (10–11)
- Andrea Wright – assistant engineering (10–11)
- Keith Hartley – engineering (12–16)
- Ian McFarlane – assistant engineering (12–14)
- Keith Andrews – engineering (17)
- Digby Pearson – executive production
- Mitch Dickinson – compilation compiling
- Jeffrey Walker – compilation compiling
- Noel Summerville – mastering
- Antz White – art direction, design, digital manipulation
- Dan Tobin – sleeve notes
