= Torn Arteries =

Studio album by Carcass
- Released: 17 September 2021
- Recorded: November 2018 – August 2019
- Studios: Ghost Ward (Stockholm, Sweden), The Stationhouse (Leeds, United Kingdom)
- Genres: Melodic death metal; grindcore death metal
- Length: 48:58
- Label: Nuclear Blast

Carcass chronology
Despicable (2020)	Torn Arteries (2021)

Singles from Torn Arteries
- 1. "Under the Scalpel Blade" Released: 13 December 2019; 2. "Kelly's Meat Emporium" Released: 18 June 2021; 3. "Dance of Ixtab (Psychopomp & Circumstance March No.1 in B)" Released: 13 August 2021; 4. "The Scythe's Remorseless Swing" Released: 17 September 2021

Professional ratings
Review scores
Source	Rating
Blabbermouth.net	8.5/10
Kerrang!	4/5 stars
Metal Hammer (GER)	5/7
Metal Injection	9/10
Rock Hard	8.0/10
Sonic Perspectives	8.8/10
Wall of Sound	8/10

Torn Arteries is the seventh studio album by English extreme metal band Carcass. It was released on 17 September 2021. Named after a demo tape recorded by former Carcass drummer Ken Owen during his teenage years, this is the band's first album in eight years after its predecessor Surgical Steel (2013). It also marked the first time since 1993's Heartwork that Carcass had recorded more than one album with the same lineup – with bassist/vocalist Jeff Walker, guitarist Bill Steer and drummer Daniel Wilding, and the first to not feature Owen in any capacity. Torn Arteries was initially scheduled to be released on 7 August 2020, but the COVID-19 pandemic caused the album to be delayed for over a year.

== Accolades ==
=== Year-end lists ===
Publication	Country	Accolade	Rank	Ref.
Consequence	US	Top 30 Metal and Hard Rock Albums of 2021	2	
Decibel	US	Decibel's Top 40 Albums of 2021	1	
Metal Hammer	UK	The top 10 death metal albums of 2021	1	
Revolver	US	25 Best Albums of 2021	21	
Rolling Stone	US	The 10 Best Metal Albums of 2021	4	

== Track listing ==
All lyrics are written by Jeffrey Walker; all music is composed by Bill Steer, Walker and Daniel Wilding.

Torn Arteries track listing
No.	Title	Length
1.	"Torn Arteries"	4:00
2.	"Dance of Ixtab (Psychopomp & Circumstance March No. 1 in B)"	4:29
3.	"Eleanor Rigor Mortis"	4:14
4.	"Under the Scalpel Blade"	3:55
5.	"The Devil Rides Out"	5:22
6.	"Flesh Ripping Sonic Torment Limited"	9:42
7.	"Kelly's Meat Emporium"	3:23
8.	"In God We Trust"	3:57
9.	"Wake Up and Smell the Carcass / Caveat Emptor"	4:36
10.	"The Scythe's Remorseless Swing"	5:20
Total length:		48:58

Japanese edition bonus track
No.	Title	Length
11.	"NWOBHEAD"	3:02
Total length:		52:00

== Personnel ==
- Jeff Walker – bass, lead vocals
- Bill Steer – guitars, backing vocals
- Daniel Wilding – drums, backing vocals

== Charts ==
Chart performance for Torn Arteries
Chart (2021)	Peak position
Australian Albums (ARIA)	78
Austrian Albums (Ö3 Austria)	12
Belgian Albums (Ultratop Wallonia)	94
Finnish Albums (Suomen virallinen lista)	7
German Albums (Offizielle Top 100)	9
Italian Albums (FIMI)	66
Japanese Albums (Oricon)	29
Polish Albums (ZPAV)	16
Scottish Albums (Official Charts)	13
Spanish Albums (Promusicae)	91
Swiss Albums (Schweizer Hitparade)	19
UK Albums (Official Charts)	62
UK Independent Albums (Official Charts)	4
UK Rock & Metal Albums (Official Charts)	4
US Independent Albums (Billboard)	44
US Top Album Sales (Billboard)	16
US Top Hard Rock Albums (Billboard)	15
US Top Rock Albums (Billboard)	46
