= Tools of the Trade =

EP by Carcass
- Released: 23 June 1992
- Genre: Death metal
- Length: 17:39
- Label: Earache; Relativity
- Producer: Colin Richardson

Carcass chronology
Necroticism – Descanting the Insalubrious (1991)	Tools of the Trade (1992)	Heartwork (1993)

Professional ratings
Review scores
Source	Rating
Allmusic	3/5 stars

Tools of the Trade is an EP by English extreme metal band Carcass. It was released by Earache Records on 23 June 1992.

It contains re-recordings of two previously released Carcass songs; "Pyosisified (Rotten to the Gore)" from Reek of Putrefaction and "Hepatic Tissue Fermentation", which was originally released on a compilation titled Pathological.

== Track listing ==
No.	Title	Length
1.	"Tools of the Trade"	3:07
2.	"Incarnated Solvent Abuse"	4:45
3.	"Pyosisified (Still Rotten to the Gore)"	3:10
4.	"Hepatic Tissue Fermentation II"	6:37
Total length:		17:39

== Other appearances ==
The EP is wholly contained on the compilation album Gods of Grind and the limited edition 2008 dualdisc reissue of Necroticism – Descanting the Insalubrious. It also appears on Wake up and Smell the... Carcass, but without the track "Incarnated Solvent Abuse".

== Personnel ==
Carcass

- Jeff Walker – bass, vocals
- Bill Steer – guitars, vocals
- Michael Amott – guitars
- Ken Owen – drums

Production

- Colin Richardson – production
