= Surgical Remission/Surplus Steel =

EP by Carcass
- Released: 11 November 2014
- Recorded: 2013
- Studio: The Chapel Studios, Lincolnshire, England, The Treehouse Studios, Derbyshire, England
- Genre: Melodic death metal
- Length: 17:40
- Label: Nuclear Blast
- Producer: Colin Richardson

Carcass chronology
Surgical Steel (2013)	Surgical Remission/Surplus Steel (2014)	Despicable (2020)

Professional ratings
Review scores
Source	Rating
Metal Injection	Mixed
Metal Temple	10/10
Punknews.org	3.5/5 stars
Reflections of Darkness	7/10
This is Not a Scene	8/10

Surgical Remission/Surplus Steel is an EP by British extreme metal band Carcass. The EP consists of songs recorded during the sessions for previous album Surgical Steel and was released on 11 November 2014 through Nuclear Blast.

== Release and promotion ==
The band announced Surgical Remission/Surplus Steel with an entry on their official Facebook web presence on 15 September 2014. The song "Livestock Marketplace" was presented to the public as video clip shortly before the EP came out. The EP was released on 11 November 2014 in North America, 14 November in Europe and 17 November in the United Kingdom. Nuclear Blast issued Surgical Remission/Surplus Steel in different physical formats and as digital version. The CD edition came as regular jewelcase and digipak while the 10" vinyl was made available in different colours.

Carcass went on North American tour titled "Inked in Steel" in October and November 2014 to promote Surgical Remission/Surplus Steel. They were accompanied by supporting bands Obituary, Macabre, Exhumed and Noisem.

== Track listing ==
All lyrics are written by Jeffrey Walker; all music is composed by Bill Steer, Walker and Daniel Wilding.

No.	Title	Length
1.	"A Wraith in the Apparatus"	3:31
2.	"Intensive Battery Brooding"	4:43
3.	"Zochrot"	3:22
4.	"Livestock Marketplace"	4:15
5.	"1985 (Reprise)"	1:48

== Personnel ==
=== Carcass ===
- Jeff Walker – bass, lead vocals
- Bill Steer – guitars, backing vocals
- Ben Ash – guitars
- Dan Wilding – drums

=== Technical personnel ===
- Colin Richardson – production
- Andy Sneap – mixing, mastering
- Carl Bown – engineering, mixing
- Rob Kimura – album art, layout
- Ian T. Tilton – original photography
- Mircea Gabriel Eftemie – additional art
- Jeff Walker – additional art
- Martin Nesbitt – original "tools" concept
