= Symphonies of Sickness =

- The original "gore" cover artwork

Studio album by Carcass
- Released: 4 November 1989 (Europe) 7 December 1990 (US)
- Recorded: July – August 1989
- Studios: The Slaughterhouse Studios (Great Driffield, East Yorkshire)
- Genres: Grindcore; death metal; goregrind
- Length: 43:10
- Labels: Earache, Combat (US)
- Producers: Colin Richardson, Carcass

Carcass chronology
Reek of Putrefaction (1988)	Symphonies of Sickness (1989)	Necroticism – Descanting the Insalubrious (1991)

Professional ratings
Review scores
Source	Rating
Allmusic	4/5 stars
Entertainment Weekly	B+
Metal Rules	4/5

Symphonies of Sickness is the second studio album by English extreme metal band Carcass. It was released in the UK by Earache Records on 4 November 1989 and in the United States by Combat Records on 7 December 1990.

Until 2013's Surgical Steel, this album marked the last time the band had recorded as a three-piece. This is also the band’s last album to feature lead vocals from drummer Ken Owen.

== Music ==
With Symphonies of Sickness, Carcass kept the grindcore sound of Reek of Putrefaction and added a death metal style, and Loudwire described it as "43 minutes of gore-filled fury." Eduardo Rivadavia of Loudwire assessed: "While Cannibal Corpse and other gratuitously gory extreme metal bands regaled listeners with disgusting lyrics inspired by horror movies, Liverpool, England’s aptly named Carcass resorted to forensic pathology textbooks for the source material behind their lyrics, which read like poetry for the mentally (and musically) deranged. 1989’s ‘Symphonies of Sickness’ was perhaps the definitive example, building upon the crushing force of grindcore with underrated musical precision and Jeff Walker’s vomited vocals." Compared to their previous album, Symphonies of Sickness contains a shorter track list in exchange for longer and more complex songs. Similar to their previous album, all three members of the band contributed vocals.

== Reception and legacy ==
Ned Raggett of Allmusic gave Symphonies of Sickness a four star review praising the album's depth in comparison to its predecessor Reek of Putrefaction. Raggett singled out "Exhume to Consume" as the main highlight of Symphonies of Sickness and called it an all-time Carcass number. Greg Pratt of Decibel ranked the ten tracks from Symphonies of Sickness and picked "Exhume to Consume" as the best track from the album calling it a classic death metal cut.

Symphonies of Sickness is now considered a landmark in the deathgrind sub-genre of heavy metal music. In December 2018, it became the third Carcass album to be inducted into the Decibel Hall of Fame; the first two being Necroticism – Descanting the Insalubrious and Heartwork respectively. This accolade would reward 50% of the band's full-length discography a Hall of Fame entry. In the same year, Loudwire's Eduardo Rivadavia named Symphonies of Sickness as the best goregrind album ever made. In February 2009, Symphonies of Sickness was ranked number 4 in Terrorizer's list of essential European grindcore albums.

According to the staff of Loudwire, Carcass defined the goregrind subgenre with Symphonies of Sickness.

In 2018, Chris Dick of Decibel wrote: "With longer songs, a more tuneful orientation, stronger performances and a beefier production, Symphonies of Sickness commanded immediate attention. [...] There was nothing like Symphonies in 1989, and while others have tried valiantly, there’s definitely nothing like it today."

== Releases ==
The original CD release contained 16 bonus tracks taken from the Reek of Putrefaction album. Some editions also contain "Genital Grinder II" and "Hepatic Tissue Fermentation" from the Pathological compilation. The album was reissued in 1996 with a censored outer cover proclaiming "Original artwork contained inside". It was later reissued in 2008, as part of reissuing of all of Carcass's albums to tie in with their reunion. This version included the Symphonies of Sickness demo as bonus tracks on one side of a dualdisc, while the DVD side featured the second part of an extended documentary titled The Pathologist's Report Part II: Propagation. Later editions of this reissue contain the songs on a CD and the documentary on a separate DVD. This reissue was presented in a 12-panel digipak with full lyrics and artwork.

=== Cover artwork variations ===
A limited edition (featuring the "gore" cover artwork) was once released containing 16 bonus tracks taken from the Reek of Putrefaction album. The total running time of this version is 76:58. The original "gore" cover, which was later banned and replaced by a "clean" cover, with a heavily distorted, grainy black and white image of a woman, who was murdered by an axe to her head. In 2002/2003 the gore cover was restored.

== Track listing ==
No.	Title	Length
1.	"Reek of Putrefaction"	4:11
2.	"Exhume to Consume"	3:51
3.	"Excoriating Abdominal Emanation"	4:32
4.	"Ruptured in Purulence"	4:11
5.	"Empathological Necroticism"	5:46
6.	"Embryonic Necropsy and Devourment"	5:14
7.	"Swarming Vulgar Mass of Infected Virulency"	3:11
8.	"Cadaveric Incubator of Endoparasites"	3:24
9.	"Slash Dementia"	3:23
10.	"Crepitating Bowel Erosion"	5:30

2008 bonus tracks (Symphonies of Sickness demo)
No.	Title	Length
11.	"Reek of Putrefaction"	3:42
12.	"Slash Dementia"	3:11
13.	"Embryonic Necropsy and Devourment"	4:51
14.	"Cadaveric Incubator of Endoparasites"	3:19
15.	"Ruptured in Purulence"	3:48
16.	"Crepitating Bowel Erosion"	5:15
Total length:		63:28

== Personnel ==
- Jeff Walker – bass, vocals
- Bill Steer – guitars, vocals
- Ken Owen – drums, vocals

== Charts ==
Chart (1989)	Peak position
UK Indie Chart	16
