= Gentlemans Pistols =

UK musical group

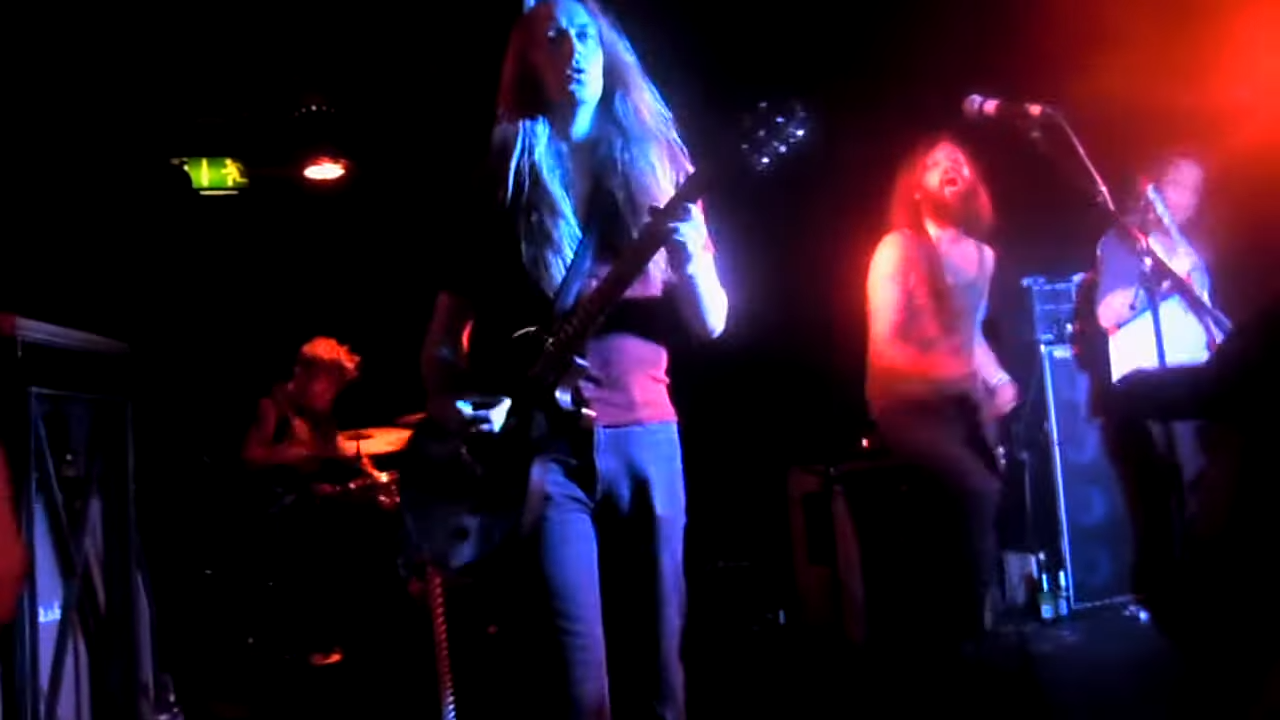
- Gentlemans Pistols in 2015

Background information
- Origin: Leeds, England, UK
- Genre: Rock
- Years active: 2003–present
- Labels: Nuclear Blast, Rise Above, Art Goes Pop Records
- Members: James Atkinson; Robert Threapleton; Bill Steer; Stuart Dobbins
- Past members: Simon Mawson; Adam Clarke; Chris Rogers; Douglas McLaughlan; Martyn Roper
- Website: gentlemanspistols.co.uk

Gentlemans Pistols are a British rock band based in Leeds, England, formed in 2003.

== History ==
Gentlemans Pistols were formed in 2003 as a three-piece by singer/guitarist James Atkinson (formerly of UK hardcore group Voorhees), bassist Douglas McLaughlan and drummer Simon Mawson, although this line-up played only one gig before the replacement of Simon Mawson by Adam Clarke in 2004. The line-up was further augmented at this time by the addition of guitarist Chris Rogers, and has remained a four-piece ever since.

They recorded a 7" single "Just A Fraction" in 2006 for the Art Goes Pop label, which was followed by a further 7" "The Lady" for Rise Above Records later that same year. This was followed by their self-titled debut album in August 2007, also on Rise Above Records. The disc was distributed in Japan via Leaf Hound Records, containing the bonus track "Comatose".

Shortly before the release of the debut album, drummer Adam Clarke announced his departure from the group. He was replaced by Stuart Dobbins, formerly of Leeds zombiecore group Send More Paramedics. In June 2009 guitarist Chris Rogers announced his departure from the band. He then was replaced by Bill Steer of Carcass and Firebird fame. This line-up recorded their 2011 album, At Her Majesty's Pleasure.

Martyn Roper was announced as the band's new bassist in April 2013, ahead of their performance at the Berlin date of the DesertFest festival.

== Personnel ==
=== Current members ===
- James Atkinson - vocals, guitar (2003–present)
- Stuart Dobbins - drums (2007–present)
- Bill Steer - guitar (2009–present)
- Robert Threapleton - bass, vocals (2014–present)

=== Former members ===
- Douglas McLaughlan - bass, vocals (2003-2013)
- Simon Mawson - drums (2003–2004)
- Chris Rogers - guitar (2004–2009)
- Adam Clarke - drums (2004–2007)
- Martyn Roper - bass, vocals (2013-2014)

== Discography ==
- Just a Fraction (7", 2006) - Art Goes Pop Records
- The Lady (7", 2006) - Rise Above Records
- Gentlemans Pistols (LP, 2007) - Rise Above Records
- At Her Majesty’s Pleasure (LP, 2011) - Rise Above Records
- Hustler's Row (LP, 2015) - Nuclear Blast
