= Surgical Steel =

Surgical Steel may refer to:

- Surgical stainless steel, a grade of stainless steel used in biomedical applications
- Surgical Steel (album), a 2013 album by Carcass
