= Swansong (album) =

Studio album by Carcass
- Released: 10 June 1996
- Recorded: February–April 1995
- Studio: Rockfield Studios, Battery Studios
- Genre: Death 'n' roll
- Length: 49:45
- Label: Earache
- Producer: Colin Richardson

Carcass chronology
Heartwork (1993)	Swansong (1996)	Wake Up and Smell the... Carcass (1996)

Singles from Swansong
- 1. "Go to Hell" Released: 1996

Professional ratings
Review scores
Source	Rating
AllMusic	4.5/5 stars
Collector's Guide to Heavy Metal	10/10
Decibel	Favorable
Kerrang!	2/5 stars
Metal Rules	4/5
MetalSucks	Unfavorable
NME	4/10

Swansong is the fifth studio album by English extreme metal band Carcass, released on 10 June 1996 by Earache Records. It marks a musical shift for the band, moving into a death 'n' roll direction. It is the only Carcass album to feature guitarist Carlo Regadas, and the last to feature founding member Ken Owen on drums. The album received mixed reviews from critics.

Swansong was intended to be the band's major label debut, having been signed by Columbia Records following the success of Heartwork, but disputes with that record company caused them to return to Earache. The album was re-released on 21 July 2008, as a dualdisc including the fifth part of The Pathologist's Report. It was the band's last studio release for over 17 years, until the release of Surgical Steel in 2013.

== Background ==
In The Pathologist's Report, drummer Ken Owen states that he considers Swansong the ultimate Carcass album. The band's sense of humour is illustrated with titles such as "Keep on Rotting in the Free World".

The disc art is the "Unfinished Pyramid et al." from the Great Seal of the United States, but it reads "carcass" instead of "annuit coeptis", "somnus pecunia cibus" instead of "novus ordo seclorum" and "MCMXCV" instead of "MDCCLXXVI".

== Release ==
Swansong was released on 10 June 1996 on Earache Records. A limited edition was released as a brain-shaped CD, with a bonus two-track CD titled Somnus Pecunia Cibus. The reason for the bonus disc was to include "Go to Hell", which would not fit on the brain-shaped CD due to the cutting required for the shape.

On 21 July 2008, a twelve-panel digipak version of the album was released, with full artwork and lyrics as well as a limited edition sticker sheet with classic Carcass motifs. The reissue also features the previously Japanese-only track "Death Rider Da" which was made to be used as a jingle on a Japanese critic Masa Ito's radio program at the time, as well as the fifth and final part of the extensive interview The Pathologist's Report on a dualdisc. Later editions contain the album on a CD and the documentary on a separate DVD, and do not include the sticker sheet.

In November 2013, Earache rereleased Swansong on full dynamic range vinyl in different colours and with limited circulation.

== Track listing ==
All lyrics are written by Jeffrey Walker.

No.	Title	Music	Length
1.	"Keep On Rotting in the Free World"	Walker	3:42
2.	"Tomorrow Belongs to Nobody"	Bill Steer, Walker	4:17
3.	"Black Star"	Carlo Regadas, Walker	3:29
4.	"Cross My Heart"	Steer, Walker	3:34
5.	"Child's Play"	Steer, Walker	5:43
6.	"Room 101"	Steer, Walker	4:35
7.	"Polarized"	Regadas, Steer, Walker	4:02
8.	"Generation Hexed"	Steer, Walker	3:48
9.	"Firm Hand"	Regadas, Walker	5:22
10.	"R**k the Vote"	Walker	3:53
11.	"Don't Believe a Word"	Steer, Walker	3:57
12.	"Go to Hell"	Walker	3:22
Total length:			49:45

Japanese/2008 reissue bonus track
No.	Title	Length
13.	"Death Rider Da"	1:18
Total length:		51:03

The Pathologist's Report DVD
No.	Title	Length
1.	"Issues with the Release"
2.	"Extreme but Not as We Know It"
3.	"Moving to Columbia"
4.	"The Cover Artwork"
5.	"Mike Hickey and Carlo's Involvement"
6.	"The End Is Night"
7.	"The Aftermath"
8.	"Influencing the Next Generation"
9.	"Ken Talks About His Illness"
10.	"Outtakes"

== Personnel ==
=== Carcass ===
- Jeffrey Walker – bass, vocals
- Bill Steer – guitars
- Carlo Regadas – guitars
- Ken Owen – drums

=== Technical personnel ===
- Colin Richardson – production, vocals (track 13)
- Nick Brine – assistant engineering
- Jim Brumby – assistant engineering
- Gee – painting
- Stephen Harris – engineering
- Barney Herbert – assistant engineering
- Noel Summerville – mastering
- Antz – Design
- Rosalba Picerno – band photos

== Charts ==
Chart (1996)	Peak position
US Heatseekers Albums (Billboard)	46
Finnish Albums (Suomen virallinen lista)	33
