= Daniel Wilding =

English drummer

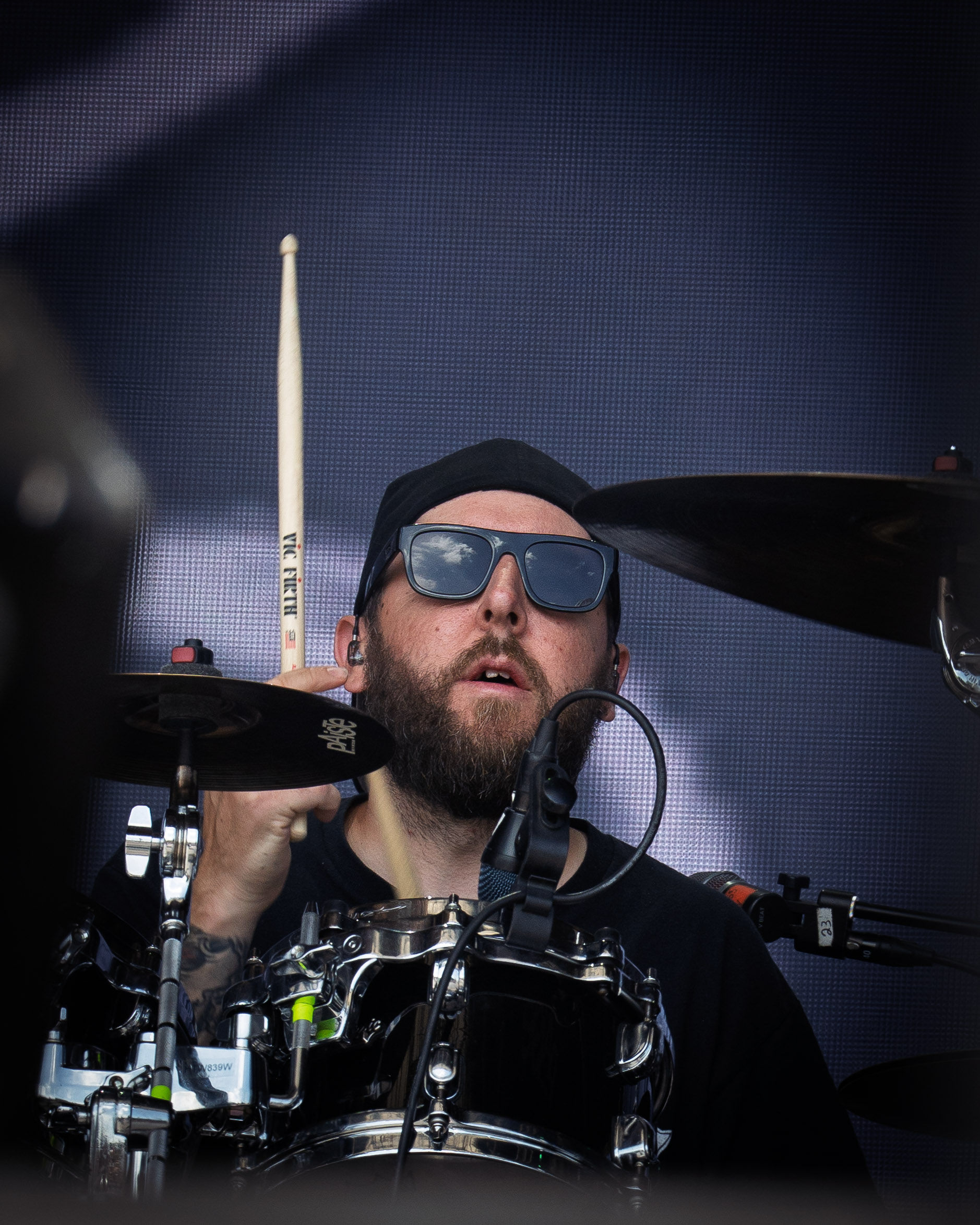
- Wilding with Carcass in 2025

Background information
- Born: 22 January 1989 (age 37); Kettering, England
- Genres: Death metal, technical death metal, grindcore
- Occupation: Drummer
- Years active: 2005–present
- Member of: Trigger the Bloodshed, Carcass
- Formerly of: Heaven Shall Burn, The Soulless, Aborted

Daniel "Dan" Wilding (born 22 January 1989) is an English drummer.

== Biography ==
Wilding started playing drums at the age of 10 and at the age of 16 joined his first band, Killing Mode. After Killing Mode disbanded, he formed a black metal band called Misery.

In 2007, Wilding joined Belgian death metal act Aborted. With them he recorded Strychnine.213, released in 2008. In 2009, he left Aborted and joined UK technical death metal band Trigger the Bloodshed. Wilding has also played drums for melodic death metal group The Soulless and blackened death metal band The Order of Apollyon. In 2011, he began to serve as touring drummer for German metalcore band Heaven Shall Burn.

In 2012 it was announced that Wilding joined as drummer for grindcore/death metal veterans Carcass, and has recorded with them all releases since Surgical Steel including their latest album titled Torn Arteries.

Wilding is married and has two kids.

== Equipment ==
Wilding uses Tama drums, Paiste cymbals (as of 2021), Remo drumheads and Vic Firth sticks. He has formerly used Sabian as well as Meinl cymbals.

== Discography ==
=== With Aborted ===
- Strychnine.213 (2008, Century Media Records)

=== With The Order of Apollyon ===
- The Flesh (2010, Listenable Records)
- The Sword and the Dagger (2015, Listenable Records)

=== With Trigger the Bloodshed ===
- Degenerate (2010, Rising Records)
- Kingdom Come EP (2011, Independently Released)

=== With Heaven Shall Burn ===
- Veto (2013, Century Media Records, guest appearance)

=== With Carcass ===
- Surgical Steel (2013, Nuclear Blast)
- Surgical Remission/Surplus Steel (2014, Nuclear Blast)
- Despicable (2020, Nuclear Blast)
- Torn Arteries (2021, Nuclear Blast)
