= Heartwork =

- Cover art by H. R. Giger

Studio album by Carcass
- Released: 18 October 1993 (Europe); 11 January 1994 (US)
- Recorded: 18 May 1993 – 21 June 1993
- Studio: Parr Street Studios
- Genres: Melodic death metal; technical death metal
- Length: 41:55
- Labels: Earache; Columbia
- Producer: Colin Richardson

Carcass chronology
Tools of the Trade (1992)	Heartwork (1993)	Swansong (1996)

Singles from Heartwork
- 1. "Buried Dreams" Released: 1993; 2. "Heartwork" Released: 1994; 3. "No Love Lost" Released: April 11, 1994; 4. "Embodiment" Released: 1994

Heartwork is the fourth studio album by English extreme metal band Carcass. The album was released in the UK on 18 October 1993 by Earache Records, and in the United States on 11 January 1994 by Columbia Records, making it the band's only major label release. Heartwork has been described as the band's "breakthrough" and "mid-period masterpiece", as well as a landmark album in melodic death metal. The album was recorded at Parr Street Studios, Liverpool from 18 May – 21 June 1993.

The sculpture depicted in the cover art, Life Support 1993, was designed by H. R. Giger, and is an update of a sculpture he created in the late 1960s. The video for the title track features a real-life interpretation of the sculpture, including a human welded as a part of it. The album was reissued as a Dualdisc on 2 June 2008.

Until 2021's Torn Arteries, this was the only Carcass album to have the same lineup as the previous album. Guitarist Michael Amott left the band after the recording of the album before founding Spiritual Beggars, and was temporarily replaced by Mike Hickey. In The Pathologist's Report, Bill Steer says Heartwork is his favourite Carcass album.

== Background ==
The band began composing songs for Heartwork while on tour for Necroticism. Jeff Walker recalled, "I suppose what we were really doing was going for shorter songs. We were beginning to write songs that were less wandering. Not that we weren’t capable of being complex or technical — something like ‘Arbeit Macht Fleisch’ proved that to be the case."

== Music and lyrics ==
Heartwork has been noted for its strong sense of melody. According to Johnny Loftus of AllMusic, the music on the album "grafts melody onto the existing muscle of Carcass' punishing antimusic." The album's sound has been described as "relentless." The album's guitar riffs have been described as "intricate." The album contains influences from the New Wave of British Heavy Metal. The album's sound has been described as "Megadeth being flushed down a toilet." Invisible Oranges described the album's sound as "cold and massive." The album has been described as "catchy" and as "a continuous onslaught of memorable hooks." While the lyrical content on earlier Carcass releases has been described as "ridiculous medical dictionary-isms," the lyrics on Heartwork have been described as "abstract." Ken Owen's drumming has been called "curiously wobbly."

== Release ==
Heartwork sold at least 81,000 units. It spawned one single under the same name that featured the title track and non-album tracks "This is Your Life" and "Rot 'n' Roll".

The album was re-released in 2008 as part of an ongoing series of Carcass reissues to tie in with their reunion. The main album is presented as one side of a Dualdisc, while the DVD side features the fourth part of an extended interview/documentary titled The Pathologist's Report Part IV: Epidemic. Also included in the reissue is a bonus disc including the entire album in demo form, something recorded by the band before recording the actual album in an effort to be better prepared. The demo features the same 10 songs in a slightly different order. Later editions have the DVD on a separate disc, bringing the total to 3 discs. The album is presented in a 12-panel digipak with full lyrics and artwork.

== Critical reception and legacy ==
Professional ratings
Review scores
Source	Rating
AllMusic	4.5/5 stars
Collector's Guide to Heavy Metal	8/10
Entertainment Weekly	C+
Los Angeles Times	2/4 stars
Metal Rules	5/5
Q	4/5 stars
Rock Hard	9.0/10
Rolling Stone	3.5/5 stars

Although the origins of melodic death metal are largely credited to the Gothenburg scene, some great attempts at introducing melody have been successfully made before, and Carcass' "Heartwork" is the most significant example. As a result, Carcass is often cited as one of the early adherents of the Gothenburg credo, despite hailing from Liverpool, UK.

— Vlad Nichols of Ultimate Guitar (June 21, 2020)

Heartwork is considered by some to be the best British extreme metal album of the 1990s, and is widely considered to be one of the greatest death metal albums of all time. In an October 2007 interview, Evile frontman Matt Drake described Heartwork as "just one of the best albums ever." Metal Hammer said the album was "arguably the point where melodic death metal became a cohesive idea," calling it the genre's "defining statement."

Hank Schteamer of Pitchfork described Heartwork as Carcass's "mid-period masterpiece," and praised the album as being "perhaps the greatest example to date of an extreme-metal band nodding to the polish and swagger of above-ground rock while retaining their core ferocity." Johnny Loftus called the album the band's "breakthrough release" on AllMusic, and suggested that while "some purists might decry its melodic breaks for soloing or nods toward conventional structure[,] Heartwork is that rare album that so carefully dissects and reconstructs its original form that its additional body parts seem like they were there all along."

Decibel called Heartwork "a thing of pure metal glory" and a landmark in death metal, crediting the band's innovations for taking the genre to "new places."

In 2003, Heartwork was named one of "The Best 25 Heavy Metal Albums of All Time" in Sound of the Beast: The Complete Headbanging History of Heavy Metal, by Ian Christe.

In May 2013, Heartwork was inducted into the Decibel Magazine Hall of Fame, becoming the 100th overall inductee and second Carcass album to be featured in the Decibel Hall of Fame, right after Necroticism.

In 2017, Rolling Stone ranked Heartwork as 51st on their list of 'The 100 Greatest Metal Albums of All Time.'

The band Carnal Forge named themselves after the song of the same name from this album. Additionally, the album's influence has been observed in the works of Arsis, The Black Dahlia Murder, Arch Enemy and Angela Gossow."

The album's first track "Buried Dreams" has been called "one of the mightiest [opening tracks] any record has ever had."

Late Death frontman Chuck Schuldiner said Bill Steer's guitar work on the album "had that magic rarely heard anymore."

== Track listing ==
All lyrics are written by Jeff Walker.

No.	Title	Music	Length
1.	"Buried Dreams"	Bill Steer	3:58
2.	"Carnal Forge"	Steer; Michael Amott	3:54
3.	"No Love Lost"	Steer	3:22
4.	"Heartwork"	Steer; Amott	4:33
5.	"Embodiment"	Amott; Steer	5:36
6.	"This Mortal Coil"	Steer; Amott	3:49
7.	"Arbeit macht Fleisch"	Steer	4:21
8.	"Blind Bleeding the Blind"	Steer	4:57
9.	"Doctrinal Expletives"	Steer; Amott	3:39
10.	"Death Certificate"	Amott; Steer	3:38
Total length:			41:55

== Personnel ==
=== Carcass ===
- Jeff Walker – bass, vocals
- Michael Amott – guitars
- Bill Steer – guitars (Note: Bill Steer played all rhythm guitars on this album)
- Ken Owen – drums

=== Additional personnel ===
- Keith Andrews – engineering
- Dave Buchanan – assistant engineering
- Colin Richardson – production
- Andrea Wright – assistant engineering
- H. R. Giger – front album sculpture
- Jurg Kümmer – photo
- Andrew Tuohy – design
