= Reek of Putrefaction =

Studio album by Carcass
- Released: 28 July 1988
- Recorded: December 1987–March 1988
- Studio: Rich Bitch Studios
- Genres: Goregrind; grindcore
- Length: 39:41
- Labels: Earache, Combat (US)
- Producers: Carcass, Paul Talbot

Carcass chronology
Reek of Putrefaction (1988)	Symphonies of Sickness (1989)

Alternative cover
- "Clean" 2002 re-issue cover

Professional ratings
Review scores
Source	Rating
AllMusic	3/5 stars

Reek of Putrefaction is the debut studio album by English extreme metal band Carcass. It was released by Earache Records on 28 July 1988. It is considered the first release in the goregrind genre, which the band pioneered.

== Recording and production ==
Reek of Putrefaction was recorded in four days at Rich Bitch Studios in Birmingham. According to guitarist Bill Steer, the studio's engineer "ruined" the record, especially its drum tracks. Carcass had only had a few hours available of mixing, so they had to release the LP as it was to meet the label's deadline. The band were "everything but happy" with the result, declared Steer.

When the master recording was first sent to the pressing plant, the original vinyl LP had to be pressed at lower volumes, because the bass frequencies were so low (sometimes reaching 25 Hz) that they were in danger of rendering higher frequencies inaudible.

== Music and lyrics ==
Guitarist-vocalist Bill Steer retrospectively said that "The first album wasn’t very focused, it was just about being fast and heavy..."

He went on to say that the band did not intend the muddy sound present throughout the album: "The first one obviously is a crazy accident. It’s got a small following but we did not intend to make that record the thing that people hear now. We had different ideas and we just couldn’t execute them. We were too young, too naïve, and inexperienced. From 'Symphonies' onwards, we got better at achieving the things we wanted to achieve in the studio."

Revolver said that the album's music was "hectic, brutal and sounds like it was recorded beneath a stack of wet mattresses."

Invisible Oranges wrote: "Carcass’ 1988 [debut] set new standards for auditory dismemberment, channeling the sound of Napalm Death through a vomited, gore-encrusted wormhole backwards. This is the aural nightmare of the dissecting table pushed beyond the extremes previously explored by the tinny sounds of blackthrash with bowl-rupturing, gurgling low end. Ken Owen flails about so nightmarishly you can’t even really distinguish if he’s even playing drums or has merely taken the contents of mortician’s tools of the trade and thrown them out of the window of morgue into the biohazard-labeled dumpster."

Lyrical themes explored on the album include vomitting, feces, wound healing, and foeticide. According to Revolver, the track "Foeticide" is a "horrific description of abortion by electrocution [...] a mad scientist frying human babies in their wombs."

== Release history ==
Reek of Putrefaction was first released in 1988. When released, Reek of Putrefaction reached No. 6 on the UK Indie Chart, establishing Carcass' earlier grindcore sound. The late BBC Radio 1 DJ John Peel declared it his favourite album of 1988, in an interview for British newspaper The Observer.

Reek of Putrefaction was re-released in 1994. In 2002, the album was reissued.

The album was re-released in 2008 as part of an ongoing series of Carcass reissues to tie in with their reunion. The main album, along with the demo Flesh Ripping Sonic Torment, is presented as one side of a dualdisc, while the DVD side features the first part of an extended documentary titled The Pathologist's Report Part I: Incubation. Later editions contain the album on a CD and the documentary on a separate DVD. The album is presented in a 12-panel digipak with full lyrics and artwork and is sealed in a white medical bag with sticker, to hide the controversial cover art.

== Artwork ==
The original album cover consisted of a collage of autopsy photographs collected from medical journals. It has been said that the cover artwork "feature[s] real life abnormalities, grotesqueries and decomposition," and that "it's like a Where's Waldo? of gore... You find something new every time you look at it!"

Reek of Putrefaction was re-released in 1994 with a "clean" cover. In 2002, the album was reissued with a censored outer cover proclaiming "Original artwork contained inside".

== Legacy ==
In 2017, Chris Dick of Decibel wrote: "Though we’ve had almost 30 years to adjust to Reek of Putrefaction’s scraping, blood-caked production, it still causes our ears to curl and hair to stand on end."

== Track listing ==
Side One: Faecal Disarticulation
No.	Title	Length
1.	"Genital Grinder"	1:32
2.	"Regurgitation of Giblets"	1:24
3.	"Maggot Colony"	1:37
4.	"Pyosisified (Rotten to the Gore)"	2:55
5.	"Carbonized Eyesockets"	1:11
6.	"Frenzied Detruncation"	0:59
7.	"Vomited Anal Tract"	1:45
8.	"Festerday"	0:22
9.	"Fermenting Innards"	2:35
10.	"Excreted Alive"	1:21
11.	"Suppuration"	2:19

Side Two: Anal Disgorgement
No.	Title	Length
12.	"Foeticide"	2:46
13.	"Microwaved Uterogestation"	1:24
14.	"Feast on Dismembered Carnage"	1:27
15.	"Splattered Cavities"	1:54
16.	"Psychopathologist"	1:18
17.	"Burnt to a Crisp"	2:43
18.	"Pungent Excruciation"	2:31
19.	"Manifestation of Verrucose Urethra"	1:02
20.	"Oxidised Razor Masticator"	3:13
21.	"Mucopurulence Excretor"	1:09
22.	"Malignant Defecation"	2:14

2008 reissue bonus tracks (taken from the Flesh Ripping Sonic Torment demo)
No.	Title	Length
23.	"Genital Grinder (Intro)"	0:50
24.	"Regurgitation of Giblets"	1:56
25.	"Festerday"	0:19
26.	"Limb from Limb"	1:05
27.	"Rotten to the Gore"	2:54
28.	"Excreted Alive"	0:55
29.	"Malignant Defecation"	1:59
30.	"Fermenting Innards"	2:33
31.	"Necro-Cannibal Bloodfeast"	1:49
32.	"Psychopathologist"	1:29
33.	"Die in Pain"	0:11
34.	"Pungent Excruciation"	3:04
35.	"Face Meltaaargh"	1:16

== Personnel ==
- Frenzied Fornicator of Fetid Fetishes and Sickening Grisly Fetes – bass, vocals
- Gratuitously Brutal Asphyxiator of Ulcerated Pyoaxanthous Goitres – guitars, vocals
- Grume Gargler and Eviscerator of Matured Neoplasm – drums, vocals
- Sanjiv – lead vocals (tracks 23–35)

== Charts ==
Chart (1988)	Peak position
UK Indie Chart	6
