= Necroticism – Descanting the Insalubrious =

Studio album by Carcass
- Released: 30 October 1991 (Europe); 11 February 1992 (North America)
- Recorded: 1991
- Studios: Amazon Studios, Simonswood, Lancashire, UK
- Genres: Death metal; technical death metal
- Length: 48:03
- Labels: Earache; Relativity
- Producer: Colin Richardson

Carcass chronology
Symphonies of Sickness (1989)	Necroticism – Descanting the Insalubrious (1991)	Tools of the Trade (1992)

Necroticism – Descanting the Insalubrious is the third studio album by English extreme metal band Carcass. It was released in Europe by Earache Records on 30 October 1991 and in North America by Relativity Records on 11 February 1992. This album is the first to feature guitarist Michael Amott and marked the first time Carcass had recorded as a four-piece. Many of the tracks describe economical ways to dispose of dead bodies. Necroticism continues the move towards a predominant death metal sound which was started in Symphonies of Sickness, featuring songs with longer sections and complex structures, more akin to the then-burgeoning technical death metal subgenre.

== Release ==
Necroticism was originally released on 21 October 1991 through Earache Records. The album was re-released in 2008 as part of an ongoing series of Carcass reissues, to tie in with their reunion. The main album is presented as one side of a dualdisc, while the DVD side features the third part of an extended documentary titled The Pathologist's Report Part III: Mass Infection, and a 23-minute interview with Walker and Amott from 1993, recorded on the Gods of Grind tour. Later editions of the reissue contain the album on a CD and the documentary on a separate DVD. Also included in the reissue is a set of four art cards. The reissue is presented in a 12-panel digipak with full lyrics and artwork.

== Musical style ==
Ken Owen and Jeff Walker said during The Pathologist's Report Part III: Mass Infection that they rejected the descriptions of Carcass's music on this album being grindcore. While Owen acknowledges its death metal characteristics, both he and Walker expressed that they are more inclined towards calling their music on this album "progressive". Music journalist T Coles described the album as having "a more straightforward death metal sound".

== Reception ==
Professional ratings
Review scores
Source	Rating
AllMusic	4/5 stars
Collector's Guide to Heavy Metal	6/10
Kerrang!	5/5 stars
Metal Rules	5/5
Rock Hard	8.5/10

AllMusic gave Necroticism four out of five stars, stating that the worthy addition of Michael Amott made the record an excellent guitarist's album. Kerrang! notably gave the album a perfect score in their 364th magazine issue. Metal Storm gave Necroticism a 9.6/10 calling it a masterpiece and a transitional album that every metalhead should own (melodic or extreme) and suggested that people should buy the album immediately.

=== Accolades ===
In 2005, Necroticism was ranked number 294 in Rock Hard magazine's book of The 500 Greatest Rock & Metal Albums of All Time. In September 2005, Necroticism was inducted into the Decibel Magazine Hall of Fame, being the eighth album overall to be featured in the Decibel Hall of Fame.

== Track listing ==
All lyrics are written by Jeffrey Walker.

No.	Title	Music	Length
1.	"Inpropagation"	Bill Steer, Ken Owen	7:07
2.	"Corporal Jigsore Quandary"	Steer, Owen, Michael Amott	5:48
3.	"Symposium of Sickness"	Owen	6:56
4.	"Pedigree Butchery"	Steer	5:17
5.	"Incarnated Solvent Abuse"	Steer, Amott	5:00
6.	"Carneous Cacoffiny"	Steer	6:43
7.	"Lavaging Expectorate of Lysergide Composition"	Steer	4:03
8.	"Forensic Clinicism / The Sanguine Article"	Steer	7:16
Total length:			48:03

2008 limited edition dualdisc bonus tracks
No.	Title	Music	Length
9.	"Tools of the Trade" (bonus tracks)	Steer, Amott	3:05
10.	"Pyosisified (Still Rotten to the Gore)" (bonus tracks)	Steer, Walker	3:08
11.	"Hepatic Tissue Fermentation II" (bonus tracks)	Steer	6:38
Total length:			60:53

The Pathologist's Report: Part III-Mass Infection DVD
No.	Title	Length
1.	"Mike's Musical Input"	1:55
2.	"A Label for Release"	3:25
3.	"Corporal Jigsore Quandary"	4:41
4.	"Achieving the Sound"	0:37
5.	"The Album Imagery"	3:11
6.	"Classic Carcass"	2:07
7.	"Meaning of the Album Title"	3:27
8.	"Back to the Rehearsal Rooms"	3:31
9.	"Red Dwarf "Smeg & the Heads""	2:20
10.	"Death Threats"	2:03
Total length:		27:17

== Credits ==
Writing, performance and production credits are adapted from the album liner notes.

=== Personnel ===
==== Carcass ====
- Jeffrey Walker – bass, vocals
- Bill Steer – guitars, vocals
- Michael Amott – guitars, backing vocals
- Ken Owen – drums, backing vocals

==== Production ====
- Colin Richardson – production, mixing
- Carcass – mixing
- Keith Hartley – engineering
- Ian McFarlane – assistance
- Dave Buchmann – assistance
- John Paul – remastering

==== Visual art ====
- Carcass – cover art
- Tom Warner – layout

=== Studios ===
- Amazon Studios, Simonswood, UK – recording
- Mine Music – remastering
