= Goregrind =

Fusion genre of grindcore and death metal

- Stylistic origins: Grindcore; death metal
- Cultural origins: Late 1980s, England and United States
- Typical instruments: Guitar; bass guitar; drums; vocals

Fusion genres
- Gorenoise

Regional scenes
- Netherlands, United States, Spain, Czech Republic, Sweden, Poland, Japan

Other topics
- Deathgrind; pornogrind

Goregrind is a fusion genre of grindcore and death metal. British band Carcass are commonly credited for the emergence of the genre with their first two albums Reek of Putrefaction and Symphonies of Sickness, along with Repulsion and Impetigo with their debut albums Horrified and Ultimo Mondo Cannibale. Goregrind is recognizable by its heavily edited, pitch-shifted vocals, abrasive musicianship rooted in grindcore, and lyrical emphasis on gore, death, pathology, and murder.

== History ==
Despite the early impact of albums such as Repulsion's Horrified and Impetigo's Ultimo Mondo Cannibale, the origins of the genre lie with British band Carcass, who began their career in the late 1980s. In their Reek of Putrefaction era, Carcass used pitch shifters, medical imagery and several visceral associations—all of which would become synonymous with goregrind.

== Characteristics ==
According to Matthew Harvey,

Gore-Grind (sic) music is characterized by its preoccupation with pitch-shifted or extremely low vocals, use of gore and forensic pathology as its exclusive subject matter, and often very fast tempos. Gore-Grind bands also have the refreshing tendency not to take themselves or their lyrics too seriously. This is evidenced by ... the often intricate and disgusting yet undeniably cartoonish splatter drawings that adorn many Gore-Grind album sleeves.

Zero Tolerance described goregrind as being defined by "detuned guitars, blasting drums (sometimes with a high-tuned, clanging 'biscuit tin' snare drum sound), sickening lyrics and often heavily processed/distorted vocals." Goregrind bands commonly use extremely low or pitch-shifted vocals. The lyrics' subject matter often features violent themes including gore, forensic pathology, death, and rape. Lyrics sometimes have a clear tongue-in-cheek Z-grade horror-movie feel and are not expected to be taken seriously. Cyjan, former drummer for Polish goregrind band Dead Infection, commented, "Musically, there's no real difference between grindcore and goregrind, but lyrically, whereas the first is socially and politically concerned, goregrind, as the name implies, deals with everything related to blood, pathological aspects or accidents with fatal results." Jon Weiderhorn of Loudwire states: "Goregrind knows no limits and the lyrics are filled with depictions of brutal misogyny, torture and horrific murder and infestations many find offensive and repellant. Those with weak stomachs should steer clear of the horrors within." The medical pathophysiology terms of many later bands have earned the genre the occasional name of "medicore".

== Offshoot genres ==
=== Pornogrind ===
Pornogrind (also known as porngrind or pornogore) is a microgenre, which is similar and related to goregrind, that deals with sexual and pornographic themes, hence the name. Notable bands include Gut and Cock and Ball Torture.

=== Gorenoise ===
Gorenoise is an offshoot of goregrind and noisecore that abandons rock-based sounds for harsh noise. New Noise Magazine characterized the genre as drum machines "hammer[ing] at 1,000 BPM over top of gurgling pitch-shifted toilet vocals". Album cover art often incorporates graphic crime scene photos and depictions of entrails. The one-man band Anal Birth is credited as one of the progenitors of gorenoise. Other projects noted for producing gorenoise are Elephant Man Behind the Sun, the early work of Torture, Meekness, and Melanocytic Tumors of Uncertain Malignant Potential.

== See also ==
- List of goregrind bands
- Deathgrind
- Death metal
