= Carcass (band) =

British death metal band

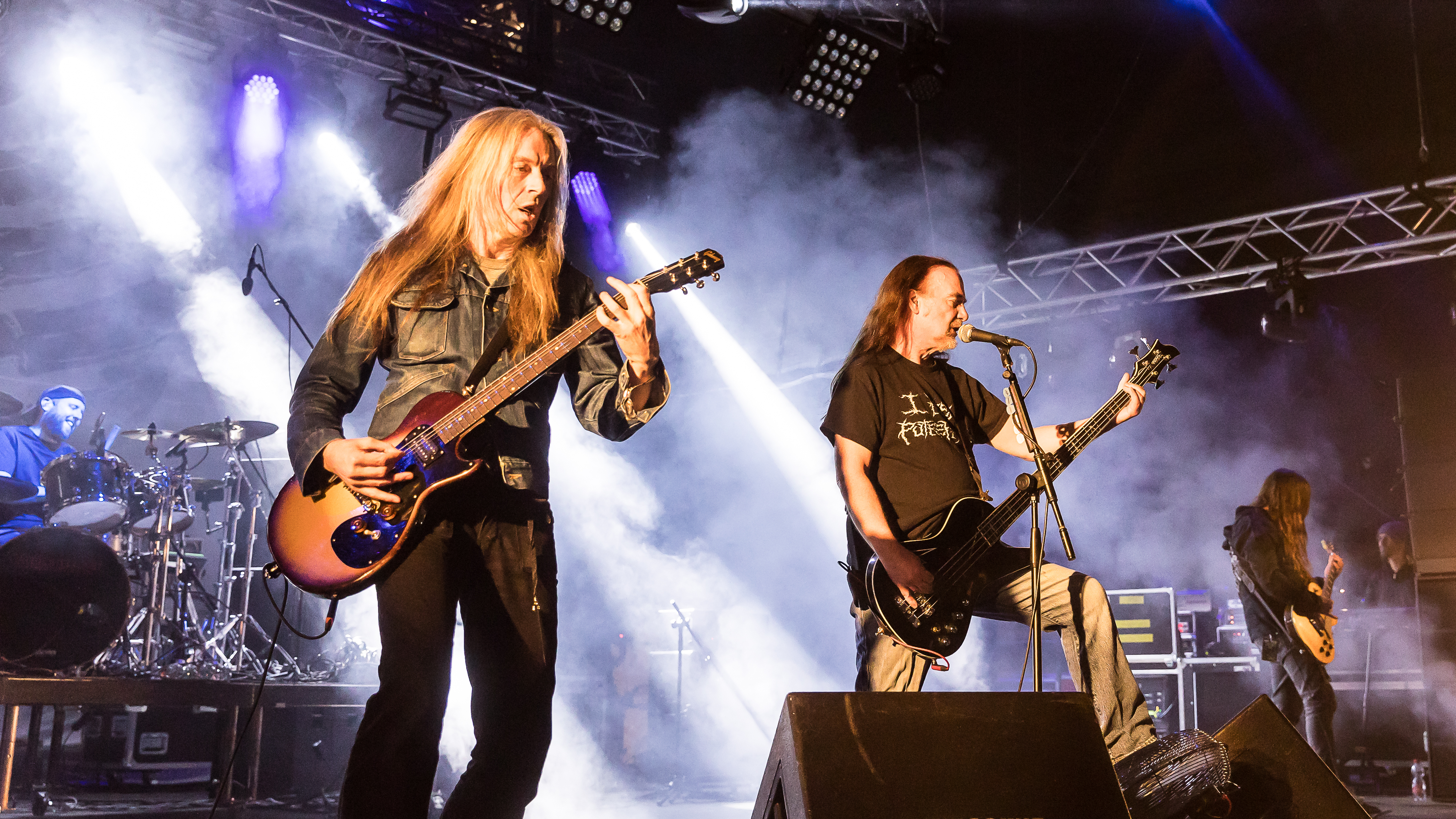
- Carcass in 2024

Background information
- Also known as: Disattack (1985–1986)
- Origin: Liverpool, England
- Genres: Death metal; melodic death metal; grindcore; goregrind (early)
- Works: Discography
- Years active: 1985–1996; 2007–present
- Labels: Earache; Nuclear Blast; Columbia/Sony; Combat; Relativity
- Spinoff of: Napalm Death
- Members: Bill Steer; Jeff Walker; Daniel Wilding; James Blackford
- Past members: Ken Owen; Sanjiv Sumner; Michael Amott; Mike Hickey; Carlo Regadas; Daniel Erlandsson; Ben Ash; Tom Draper

Carcass are an English death metal band from Liverpool, formed in 1985. The band have gone through several line-up changes. Guitarist Bill Steer and bassist-vocalist Jeff Walker are the only constant members. They broke up in 1996, but reformed in 2007 without original drummer Ken Owen, for health reasons. To date, the band have released seven studio albums, two compilation albums, four EPs, two demo albums, one video album, and six music videos.

Carcass were one of the few extreme metal acts to sign to a major label. Columbia Records handled North American distribution for their fourth studio album, Heartwork (1993), while the album was distributed worldwide by Earache, who released all of the band's albums up to and including Swansong (1996).

In 2016, the staff of Loudwire named them the 21st best metal band of all time.

== History ==
=== Early years and Reek of Putrefaction (1985–1989) ===
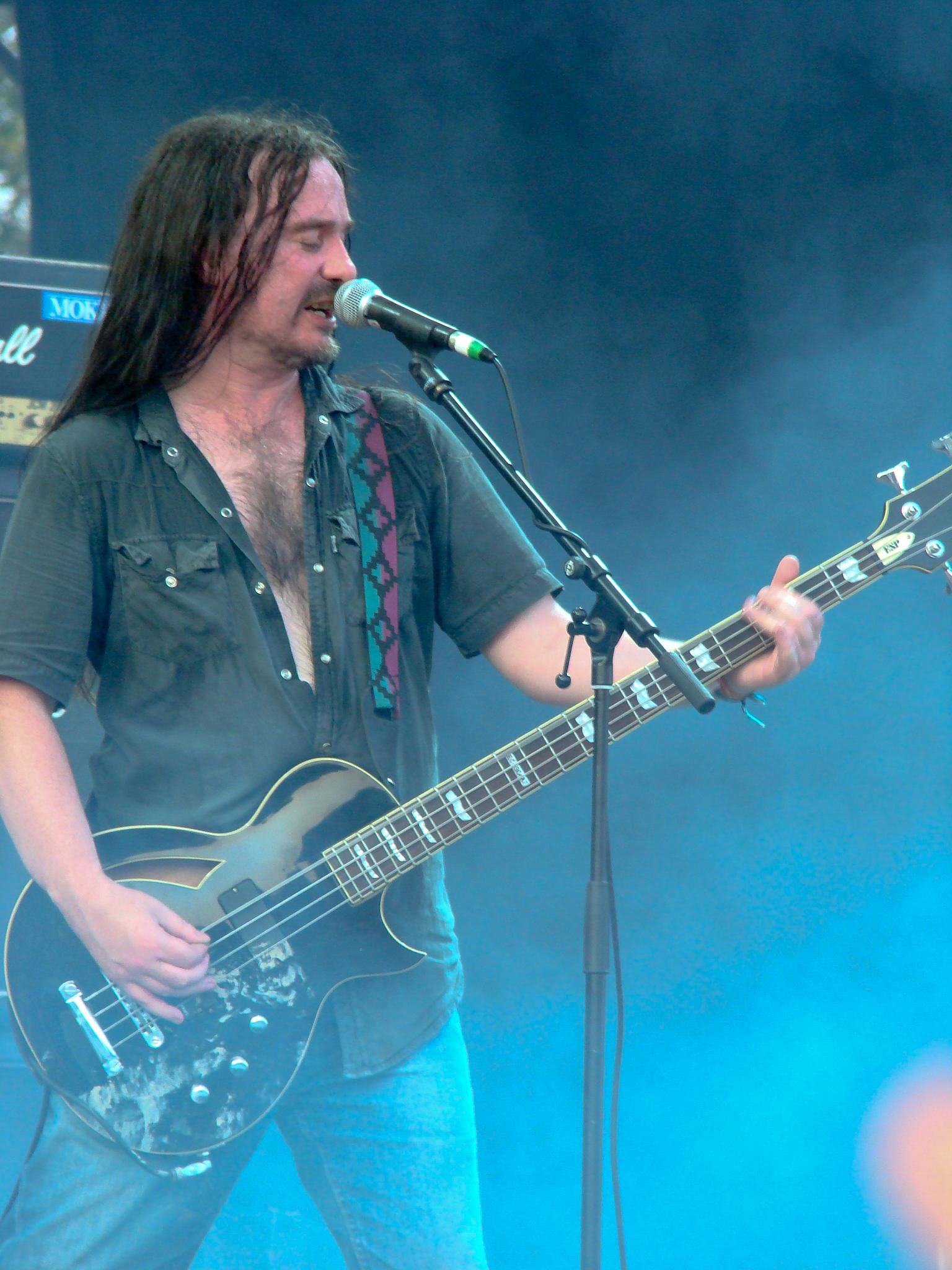
Jeff Walker at Gods of Metal, Bologna, Italy (2008)

Carcass were first formed as a school band by Bill Steer and Ken Owen that soon after disbanded. Steer joined the D-beat band Disattack with drummer Middie, Paul on bass and Pek on vocals. After releasing the four-track demo A Bomb Drops ..., in 1986, the bass player left the band and was replaced with Jeff Walker, former guitarist and vocalist of the Electro Hippies. Vocalist Andrew Pek changed his name to Sanjiv after a visit to India. At about the same time, Steer joined Napalm Death (replacing Justin Broadrick) and recorded the second side of Napalm Death's first album, Scum. Walker designed the cover art for Scum.

Disattack changed its name to Carcass as the group changed musical direction. This led to a change in drummer when Ken Owen join the band. In April 1987, they recorded the Flesh Ripping Sonic Torment demo, the only Carcass recording featuring vocalist Sanjiv, who left shortly after. Walker, Steer, and Owen shared vocal duties for the debut album, which was completed in four days. Despite the primitive production values of Carcass's debut, Reek of Putrefaction (1988), which displeased the band, it became a favourite of Radio 1 DJ John Peel. Due to his interest, they were asked to participate in their first Peel Session in 1989, where they debuted new material for their second album. The Peel Session was released as an EP with the band members adopting pseudonyms: K. Grumegargler, J. Offalmangler, and W.G. Thorax Embalmer. Also that year, Steer and Walker appeared as members of Lister's fictional band Smeg and the Heads in an episode of Red Dwarf.

=== Symphonies of Sickness and Necroticism (1989–1992) ===
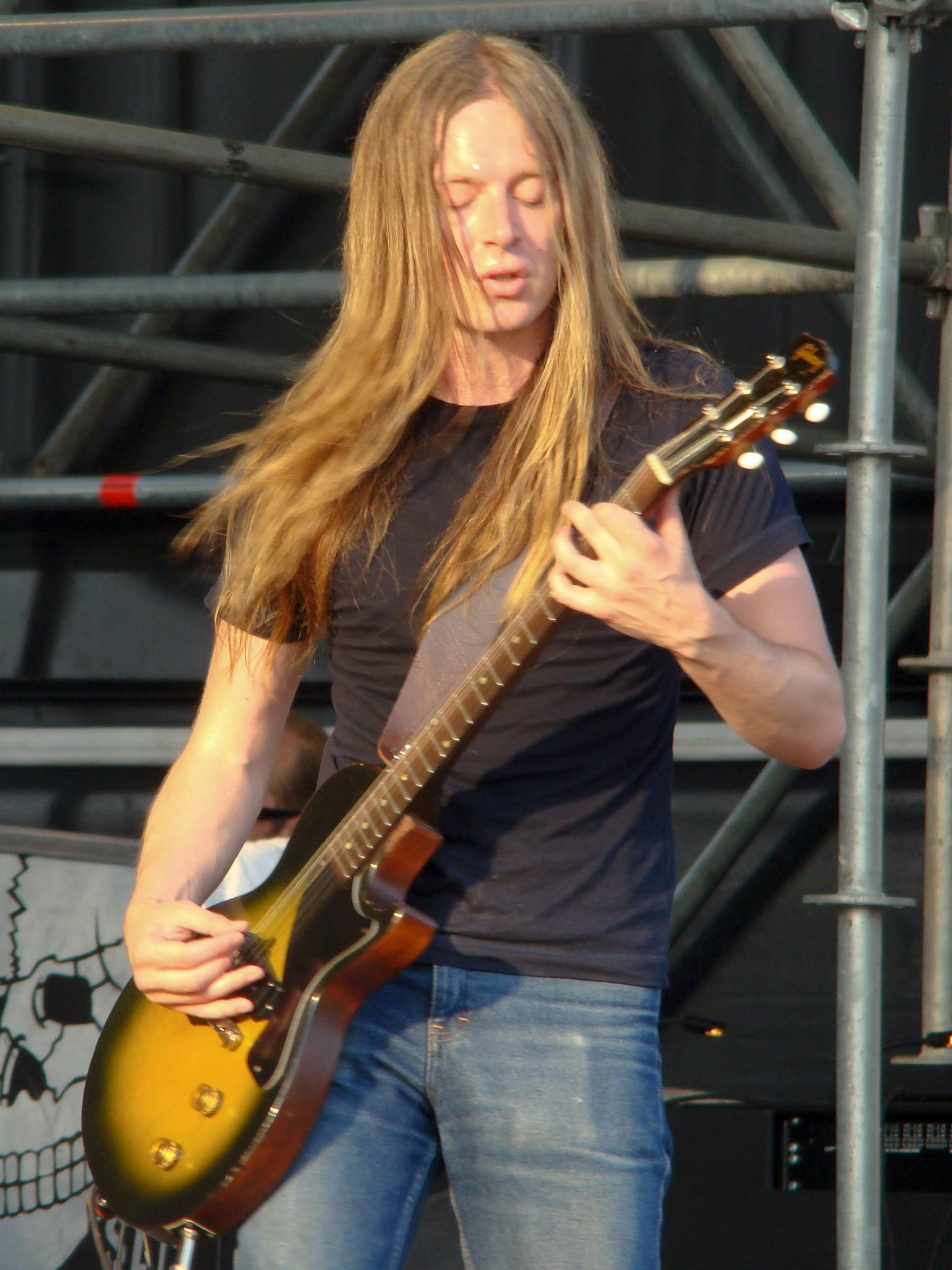
Bill Steer at Gods of Metal, Bologna, Italy (2008)

Symphonies of Sickness (1989), the second album, which contained a much improved production quality (courtesy of Colin Richardson), featured more death metal structures and longer songs with more slow passages. The second half of the tour in support of Symphonies of Sickness saw the addition of second lead guitarist Michael Amott, whose previous work included Carnage. Amott became a permanent member, playing on the second Peel Session and contributing material towards their third album.

Carcass toured Europe with Napalm Death, Bolt Thrower and Morbid Angel on the Grindcrusher tour in 1989.

Necroticism – Descanting the Insalubrious (1991) showed more intricate composition, further improved production, and guitar solos. Despite the addition of Amott, Steer handled all rhythm guitar duties, with Amott contributing leads and one riff. Carcass supported the album with heavy touring, and were part of the Earache 'Gods of Grind' tour with Cathedral, Entombed and Confessor in Europe and the United States. The Tools of the Trade EP was released in 1992 to coincide with the "Gods of Grind" tour.

Carcass toured the US with Napalm Death, Cathedral and Brutal Truth on the Campaign for Musical Destruction tour in 1992.

=== Signing to Columbia and Heartwork (1993–1995) ===
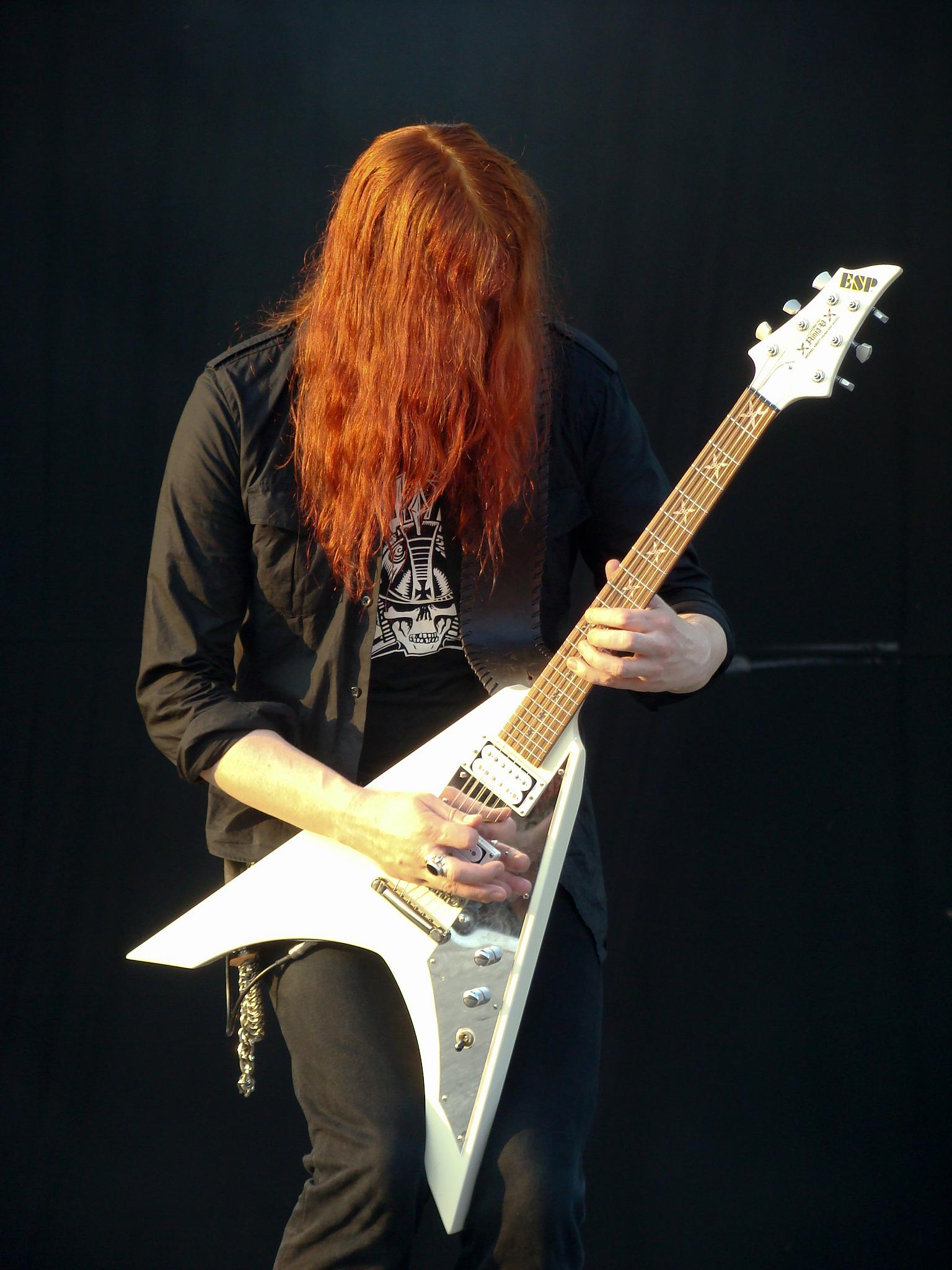
Michael Amott at Gods of Metal, Bologna, Italy (2008)

The band's fourth album, Heartwork, was released in the UK in October 1993, and did not have a US release until three months later. Many fans considered it a radical change, which eliminated Steer's deeper vocals and the clinically gory lyrics. Steer handled all rhythm guitar duties, this time due to Amott losing his passport in Israel (thus making him unable to return to England in time to record). Song structures, whilst still containing musically complex parts, were simpler, in some cases using the verse/chorus/verse formula.

After the release of Heartwork, Carcass signed a worldwide deal with Columbia Records, who hoped for commercial success, even suggesting that Jeff Walker learn how to sing. Michael Amott left the band after Heartwork was recorded, and was replaced for a while with Mike Hickey, who was later replaced with Carlo Regadas.

During the summer of 1994, Walker remixed the track "Inside Out" for a Die Krupps remix album, although the version stayed true to the original with the exception of Owen's drum samples from Heartwork replacing the Die Krupps original, and additional mixing from Walker and Colin Richardson at Parr Street studios (where Heartwork was recorded).

Carcass set about writing songs for their major label debut. During the December 1994 UK tour, Carcass showcased two songs from their current writing sessions – "Edge of Darkness" and "Firmhand", showing a more straightforward songwriting approach than on previous efforts. Around this time, "Edge of Darkness" was recorded for the BBC Radio 1 Rock Show sessions – a session that could be found on later compilation albums.

By late 1994, 17 songs were ready, and the band set about using their $200,000 advance to record the album with Colin Richardson at Rockfield studios in Monmouth, South Wales in early 1995. During the 6-week recording schedule, the record label began to withdraw support, stating that Carcass were not ready to record and needed to write more songs. This advice was ignored, as was the suggestion to have Terry Date remix the album, and the band continued. At the time, Jeff Walker stated in an interview with the UK's Metal Hammer magazine that the album was taking more of a classic rock approach, with drums, bass and twin guitars à la Thin Lizzy, in comparison to earlier "multi-layered guitar" productions. This has since been put down to Bill Steer's unwillingness to perform the time-consuming guitar layering (as once again Steer performed all rhythm guitar) through losing interest in the metal genre.

During the Swansong recording sessions, Carcass were asked to remix the Björk track "Isobel". This was not a remix as such but more of a re-recording with only Björk's vocals remaining. The track was released in March 1996 on Björk's "Hyperballad" single.

=== Swansong and breakup (1996–2006) ===
Continuing record company problems with Columbia/Sony delayed the album from late summer 1995 to June 1996, in which time Carcass moved back to Earache Records and broke up before releasing Swansong. Walker dubbed the return to Earache "the second great rock and roll swindle" as they were paid twice for the same album. Swansong featured twelve of the seventeen tracks put to tape during the recording sessions. Walker has stated in interviews that all seventeen songs should have been included in a double album, and that some songs omitted from Swansong were stronger than some of Swansong's actual content. Carcass remixed Killing Joke's "Democracy" (by re-recording the music, but keeping the original vocals), although this time Regadas performed all guitar duties, as it is thought Steer had quit the band by early 1996. The Carcass "Rooster Mix" was available on Killing Joke's Democracy. Around the time of Swansong's release, Carcass informed the press that they were ending the band without a farewell tour, but most fans had guessed this may be the case via the album title.

The album sold well, staying near the top of the Indie Rock Chart in the UK for several months, above bands such as Placebo, despite having no touring support from the band. It is rumoured that the band were offered several lucrative tours in 1995, such as supporting Iron Maiden on their "X-Factour 95" tour, which had the album been released as expected in 1995, could have improved the band's sales and longevity.

A posthumous compilation, Wake Up and Smell the... Carcass was released in October 1996, collecting Carcass' rarer material, including unreleased material, songs only available on EPs and compilations, and live tracks. An accompanying video was released a few weeks after the Wake Up CD with little knowledge from the band or their management. The video, later released on DVD, featured five of the band's promotional videos, a show from the Grindcrusher 1989 tour (as a three piece) and a show from the 1992 Gods of Grind tour. Sound on the two live shows is poor, particularly the latter, which Walker has described as "unmixed".

Owen, Walker, and Regadas continued with the band Blackstar, accompanied by former Cathedral bassist Mark Griffiths, using the second Swansong advance from Earache to fund the recording. Blackstar, later Blackstar Rising, became defunct after drummer Owen suffered a cerebral hemorrhage. Amott went on to found hard rock band Spiritual Beggars and Swedish melodic death metal band Arch Enemy. In the biggest musical departure, Steer formed Firebird, a Clapton-esque rock band.

=== Reformation (2007–2012) ===
In June 2006, in an interview with Walker, he discussed the possibility of reforming Carcass, but mentioned that it was unlikely that Owen would participate, since he could not replicate his former drumming proficiency due to the effects of the cerebral hemorrhage he suffered in 1999. In September 2007, Michael Amott announced that he was secretly rehearsing old Carcass songs with Bill Steer, Jeff Walker and Daniel Erlandsson (replacing Ken Owen) for a possible reunion tour. The original plans were to play at several festivals during the summer, but they could not meet the deadlines.

In October 2007, Carcass were confirmed to play at German heavy metal festival Wacken Open Air and Finland's Tuska Open Air Metal Festival in 2008. Carcass embarked on a reunion tour, beginning on 6 June 2008 at the Sweden Rock Festival in Norje, Sweden. Carcass played at Hellfest Summer Open Air, Metalcamp and several other festivals. The band toured Australia and New Zealand in 2008, and then North America during September and October 2008, followed by the band's first South American tour, playing in Colombia, Chile, Argentina and Brazil. On 15 November 2008, Carcass headlined the Danish Metal Awards held in Amager Bio, Copenhagen, Denmark. Steer presented the award for Best Danish Debut Album, which went to SCAMP for Mirror Faced Mentality. Carcass surprised the audience by bringing Ken Owen to the stage where he gave a brief drum solo to show how far he had come in recovering from his illness. Carcass performed an exclusive UK show at the Damnation Festival in Leeds. It was the first time Carcass had played in England in 14 years.

Carcass re-released their entire back catalogue with bonus material during 2008 on Earache Records. When asked if the band were planning on writing and recording a new album, Steer replied:

I would be very surprised if that would really happen. But never say never, I'm always the last one who needs to be convinced. Michael and Jeff are much more busy with those things than I am. I'm also not very much involved in the planning of all the festivals which are scheduled. At this moment, I barely know in which countries we're all going to play.

— Bill Steer, Voices from the Dark Side

Carcass continued to play live in 2009, completing a North American tour in March 2009 with Suicide Silence, Samael, Arsis and Psycroptic. Suffocation, Exodus, The Faceless and Toxic Holocaust played on select dates of this tour. Carcass headlined the Bloodstock Open Air in Derbyshire, England in August 2009. In August 2010, Carcass headlined Vagos Open Air in Vagos, Portugal, and Jalometalli Metal Music Festival held in Oulu, Finland. At Hellfest 2010, they performed the Necroticism album in its entirety. In 2012, Amott and Erlandsson left Carcass to focus on Arch Enemy.

=== Surgical Steel (2012–2019) ===
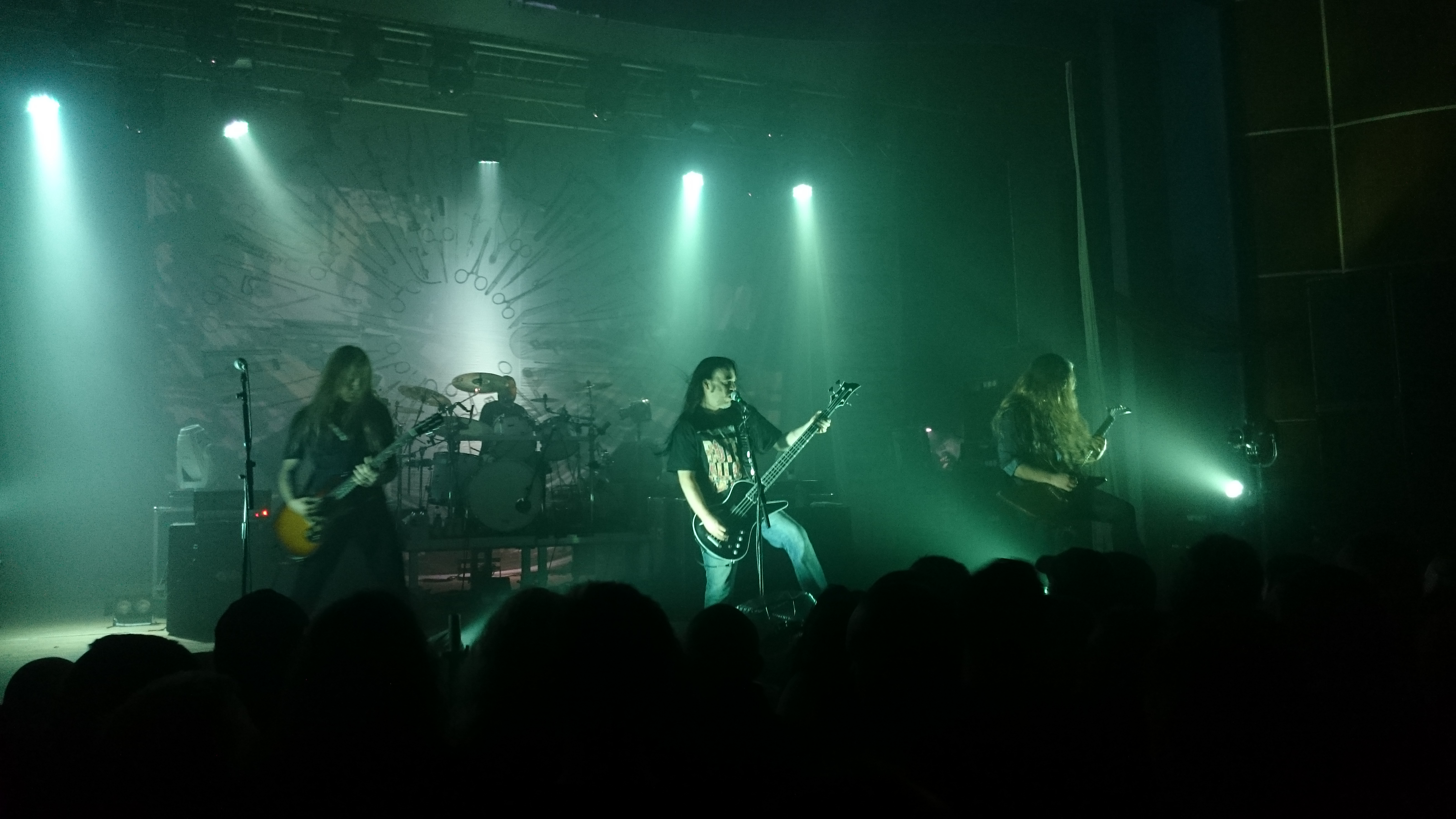
Carcass performing in 2015

Steer and Walker started talking about recording a new album after the reunion shows were done. They wrote some songs to see how they would turn out. According to Steer, "If it sounded like Carcass to us, we were going to proceed. We also said if it didn't feel right, we'd just drop it". Carcass recorded a new album in 2012, titled Surgical Steel. Daniel Wilding (drummer of Bristol-based deathgrind band Trigger the Bloodshed) performs drums on Surgical Steel. Original drummer Ken Owen was brought in to record some backing vocals on the album. Ben Ash (guitarist of Pig Iron, Desolation, and Liquefied Skeleton) joined the band in March 2013 on guitars.

On 26 March 2013, Carcass performed for the first time with their new lineup at the Camden Underworld in London, where they played for three nights. Carcass performed at the Chilean music festival Metalfest in April 2013, and the Maryland Deathfest XI music festival in May 2013.

In May 2013, Carcass signed with Nuclear Blast. In Japan, they signed a deal with Trooper Entertainment for the release of the new album. Carcass released Surgical Steel on 13 September 2013 in Europe, 16 September in the UK, and 17 September in North America. Overall the album received positive reviews. Surgical Steel earned a Top 50 position on the US Billboard 200 charts. After releasing Surgical Steel, Carcass headlined Damnation Festival in Leeds before embarking on the Defenders of the Faith Tour with Amon Amarth and Hell, which ran throughout Europe and the UK in November and December 2013. Carcass performed at 70000 Tons of Metal in January 2014 and headlined the Agglutination Festival on 23 August that year.

In a June 2014 interview with Metal Underground, Walker was asked if Carcass were going to make a follow-up to Surgical Steel. He replied, "Ultimately, as long as we feel we got somewhere to go then we would create new material. We are not just going to do it just for the sake of it. We have to feel inspired. All I can say is I do see somewhere where we can take Carcass if we choose to do another album and personally I do want to do another album. I'm not completely satisfied with any album we've made so far. I don't think we've made the classic Carcass album, that's the way I feel."

Carcass released the EP Surgical Remission/Surplus Steel in November 2014. The EP is a collection of unreleased tracks recorded during the Surgical Steel sessions and it was released on physical and digital formats. "Well, let's call this tying up loose ends," commented Walker. "We thought we'd make all the tracks available from the Surgical Steel album session on an EP… just in case you bought the jewel case version, didn't buy the digipak, didn't buy the Japanese import, or maybe you never bought the Decibel magazine issue with the flexi disc? Well, here you go; ALL the songs on one disc along with a previously unreleased track. Even Trevor Strnad's arm makes a guest appearance! Enjoy."

Carcass continued touring. They played at Download Festival in Castle Donington 13 June 2015. Reviewing their concert, James Weaver wrote: "Carcass have proved, not only that they can play any spectrum of rock festivals, but that they still remain as one of the greats in the extreme metal genre." Carcass headlined the "Deathcrusher 2015" tour with Napalm Death, Obituary, Voivod and Herod. The tour run in Europe October–November 2015. During the "Deathcrusher 2015" tour, Bill Steer rejoined Napalm Death on some dates to perform the song "Deceiver". Along with Testament, Carcass supported Slayer on their Repentless tour, which took place in February and March 2016.

In a statement released in early March 2018, Ben Ash announced he had left Carcass. Tom Draper (Pounder, ex-Angel Witch), a UK native based in California, made his first live appearance with the band at the Netherlands Deathfest on 2 March 2018 and his second appearance during the Decibel Metal and Beer Fest in Philadelphia on 1 April 2018. They opened for Slayer on selected dates of their final world tour, including ForceFest in Mexico in October 2018, and Hellfest in France in June 2019.

=== Torn Arteries (2019–present) ===
On 13 December 2019, Carcass released their first song in six years, "Under the Scalpel Blade", on digital outlets. This track was also made available to deluxe Decibel magazine subscribers.

On 23 February 2020, Carcass announced on their Facebook page that their seventh studio album would be released on 7 August. A week-and-a-half later, guitarist Bill Steer revealed Torn Arteries as the title of the album, a reference to a demo tape recorded by Ken Owen when he was a teenager. On 2 April 2020, Carcass announced that the release of the album had been delayed, due to the COVID-19 pandemic, stating, "Well there's no way our new album is gonna get released in August now, what with the pandemic, CD & vinyl manufacturers have closed and label distribution has been put on hold for the foreseeable future. There's more pressing things to be concerned with right now, correct? Bunker down, look after yourselves, let's see the next few months through and we'll get the album released as soon as there's some kind of return to 'normality'." Decibel magazine reported that the release of Torn Arteries had been postponed to 2021.

On 21 August 2020, Carcass announced that, with Torn Arteries still on hold, they would release the four-song EP Despicable on 30 October. The EP included the previously released digital single "Under the Scalpel Blade". Walker commented, "Well, the COVID situation has put the release of the new Carcass album on the backburner for the time being. Given that we said there'd be new music in August, we thought it would be cool to have a stop-gap release and let you hear some of the tracks that never quite made the cut. Don't say we never give you anything. Enjoy."

On 18 June 2021, "Kelly's Meat Emporium" was released as the lead single from Torn Arteries. On the same day, it was announced that the album would be released on 17 September 2021, eight years following the release of its predecessor, Surgical Steel. To promote the album, Carcass embarked on their North American spring 2022 headlining tour, first in six years, with support from Immolation and Creeping Death. They supported Arch Enemy and Behemoth on their co-headlining European tour in the fall of 2022, and later supported Amon Amarth on their Great Heathen Army North American tour. Touring in support of Torn Arteries continued within the next two years, including a North American tour in the spring of 2023 with Sacred Reich, Municipal Waste and Creeping Death, and tours of Japan and Australia in early 2024. A tour of the latter country included support from The Black Dahlia Murder. The band supported Hatebreed on their 30th anniversary celebration tour in the fall of 2024.

When asked in March 2024 if Carcass have started working on their next album yet, Steer said, "Not at the moment. I mean, as far as the eye can see, we've just got tours, dates, festivals. That would pretty much take us up towards the end of the year. And then beyond that, yeah, this is something that would just have to be kind of, in some way, discussed between the various bandmembers, because we had a similar situation after we released Surgical Steel. We got deep into touring, and after a couple of years, I think one or two of us thought, 'Well, maybe now we should start gradually working on some new material,' but then you discover not everybody's on the same page. So you go back and do another year or two of touring, and then before you know it, half a decade's gone. So I'm kind of hoping we don't mimic that situation too closely, because five years is a hell of a lot of time [between albums]. But, yeah, we've got to be at a point where everyone wants to record. So, if and when that time comes around, great. But it doesn't feel like it's particularly close right now."

Carcass were confirmed to be performing at the 2026 Sonic Temple music festival in Columbus, Ohio. The band were also confirmed to be making an appearance at Welcome to Rockville, which took place in Daytona Beach, Florida in May 2026.

== Musical style, influences and legacy ==
Carcass are regarded as among the pioneers of the grindcore and melodic death metal genres. They are also described as one of the earliest and most important of the new generation of grindcore and death metal bands. Their early work was also tagged as "splatter death metal" and "hardgore," on account of their morbid lyrics and gruesome album covers. Beginning with their third album Necroticism – Descanting the Insalubrious (1991), Carcass began to incorporate progressive and technical influences, and while they continued in this direction on the follow-up album Heartwork (1993), it was the band's first foray into melodic death metal. Additionally, Carcass have been called "goregrind's screaming birthers." Carcass are influenced by death metal and grindcore bands like Death, Repulsion, Obituary, Cancer, Napalm Death and Exhumed, as well as other acts such as Slayer, King Diamond, Cryptic Slaughter, Discharge, Siege, N.Y.C. Mayhem and Diamond Head.

The band's early releases, which have been described as "Gray's Anatomy set to music," were noted for their "elaborately putrid" vocabulary, which drew from medical terminology. Additionally, guitarist Bill Steer believes the band's lyrics contain black humour. On the topic of Carcass's influence on the development of the goregrind subgenre, he explained: "Some people have missed the point, sexualizing the violence or being gross for the sake of it [..] Whatever we were doing with Carcass, there was definitely some thought behind it. [...] But it's easy to be shocking, isn't it? It's easy to say horrible things. I'd like to say we did it with a sense of humor."

Otrebor of black metal band Botanist cites Carcass' use of medical dictionary terms in lyrics and song titles as a precedent for its lyrics and song titles from plant and insect dictionaries. Ben Weinman has cited Carcass as a key early influence on his band the Dillinger Escape Plan. The late Trevor Strnad, who served as the vocalist for The Black Dahlia Murder until his death in 2022, had cited on many occasions that he was primarily influenced by Carcass in vocalizing technique. Deathcore and metalcore acts Bring Me the Horizon, Whitechapel, All Shall Perish, Killswitch Engage and All That Remains cited Carcass as an influence. Canadian rock band Sum 41 also cited them as an influence. American deathgrind band Cattle Decapitation has cited them as an influence as well. Post-rock band The Fierce and the Dead have cited them as an influence.

=== In popular culture ===
In the Red Dwarf episode "Timeslides", Steer and Walker appeared as members of Lister's childhood band, Smeg and the Heads. During the Friends episode "The One with the Cheap Wedding Dress", Megan and Phoebe talk about Carcass. Megan told Monica that her fiancé wants them to play at their wedding.

== Band members ==
Carcass performing at Luppolo at Rock in 2022

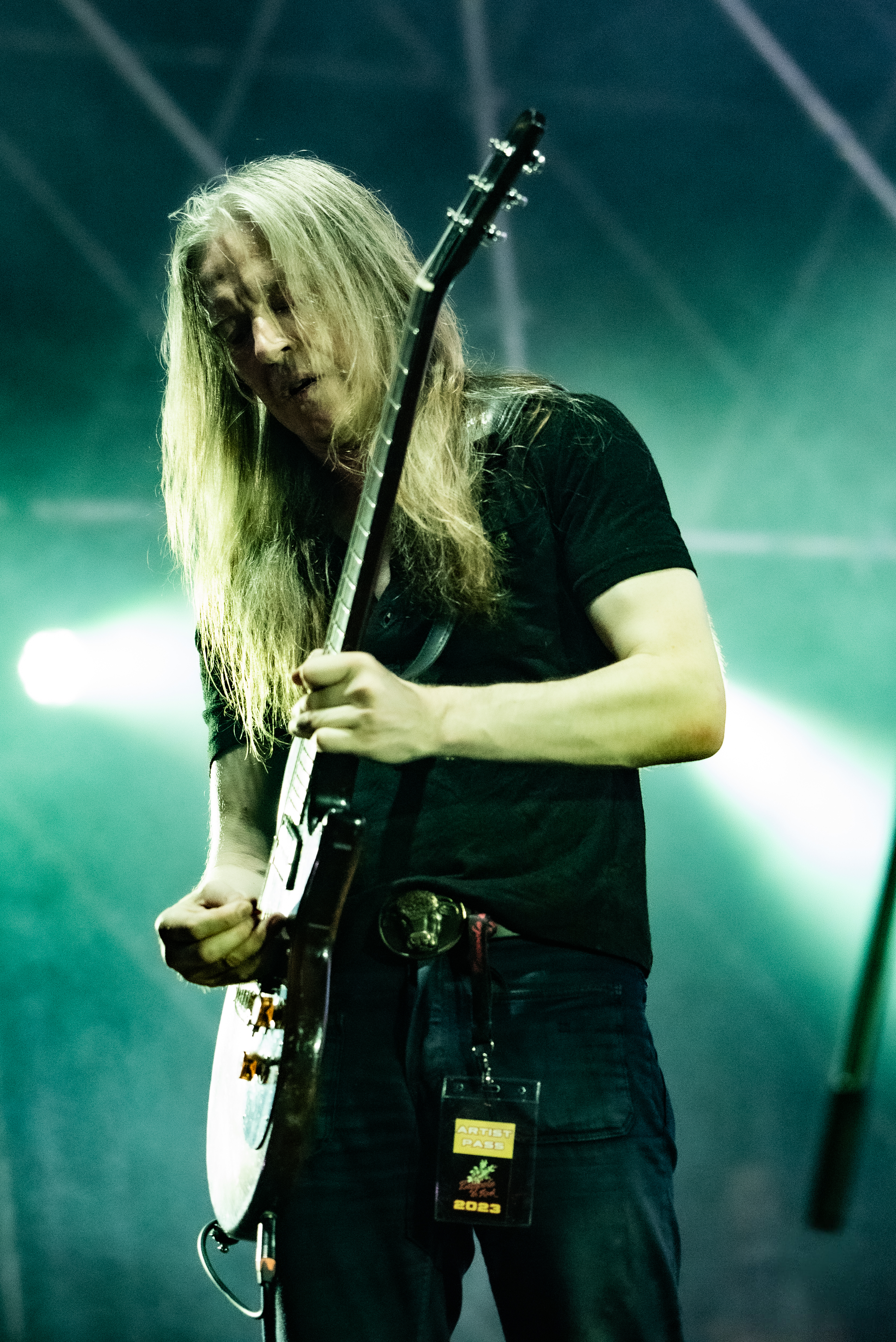
Steer

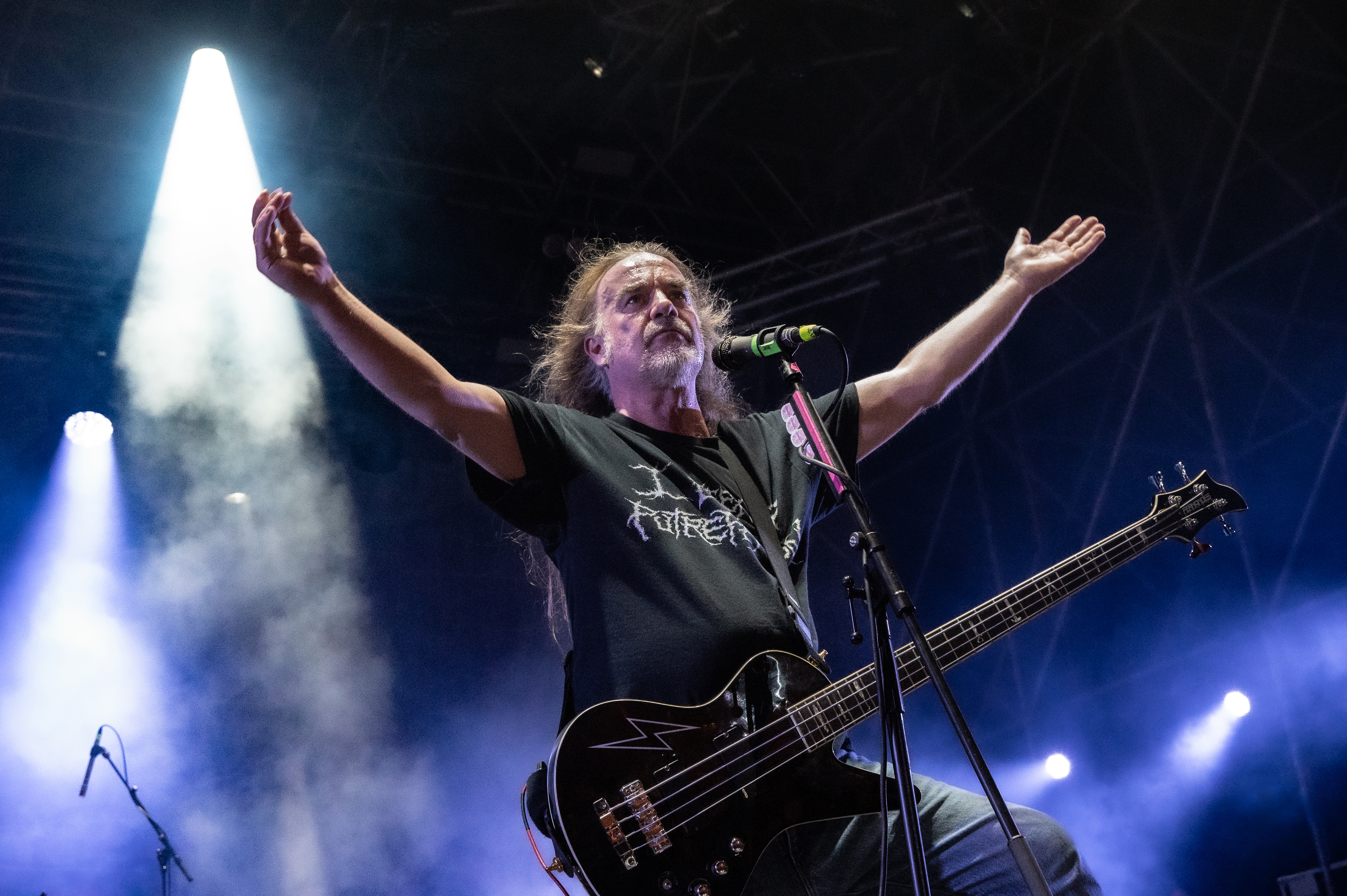
Walker

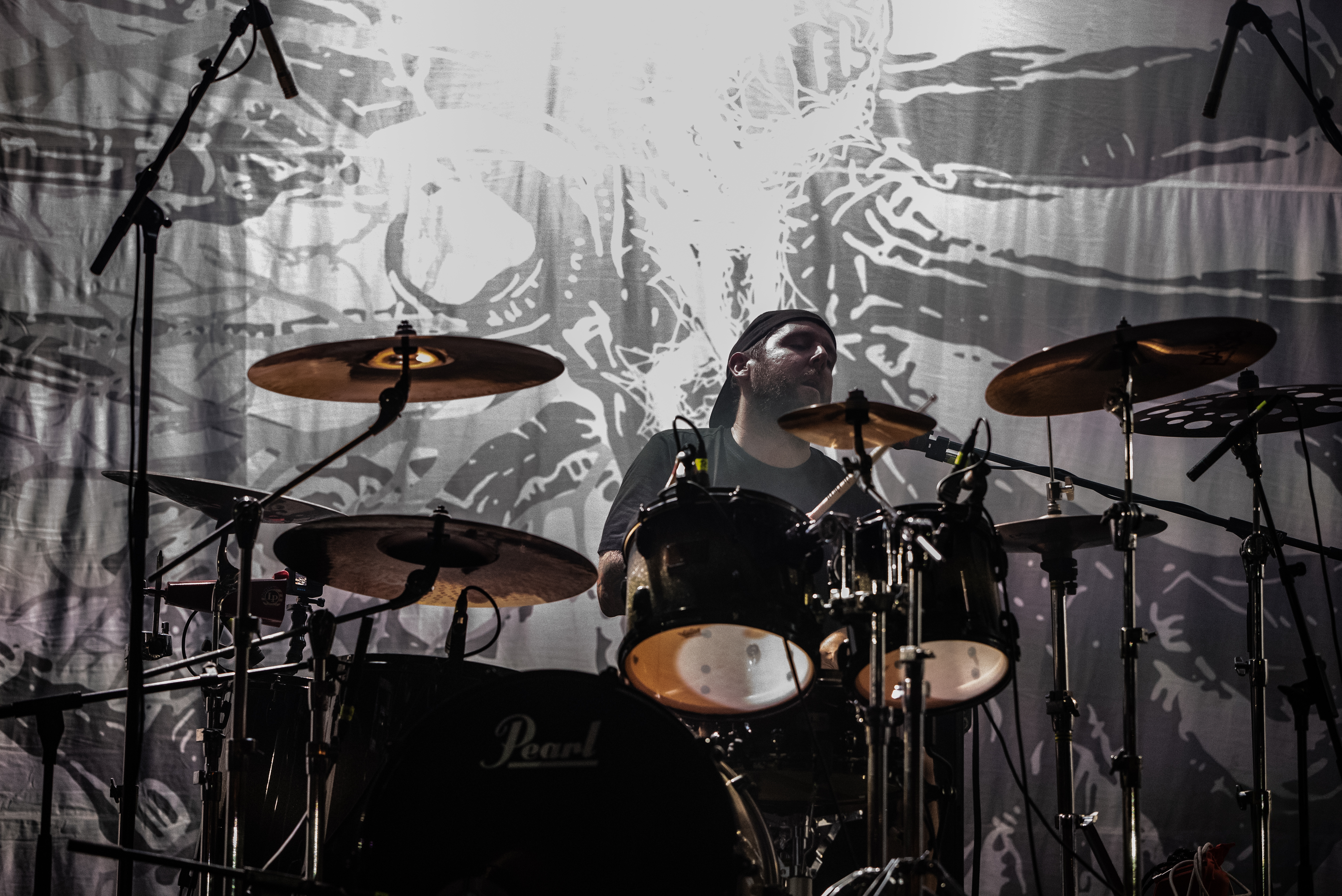
Wilding

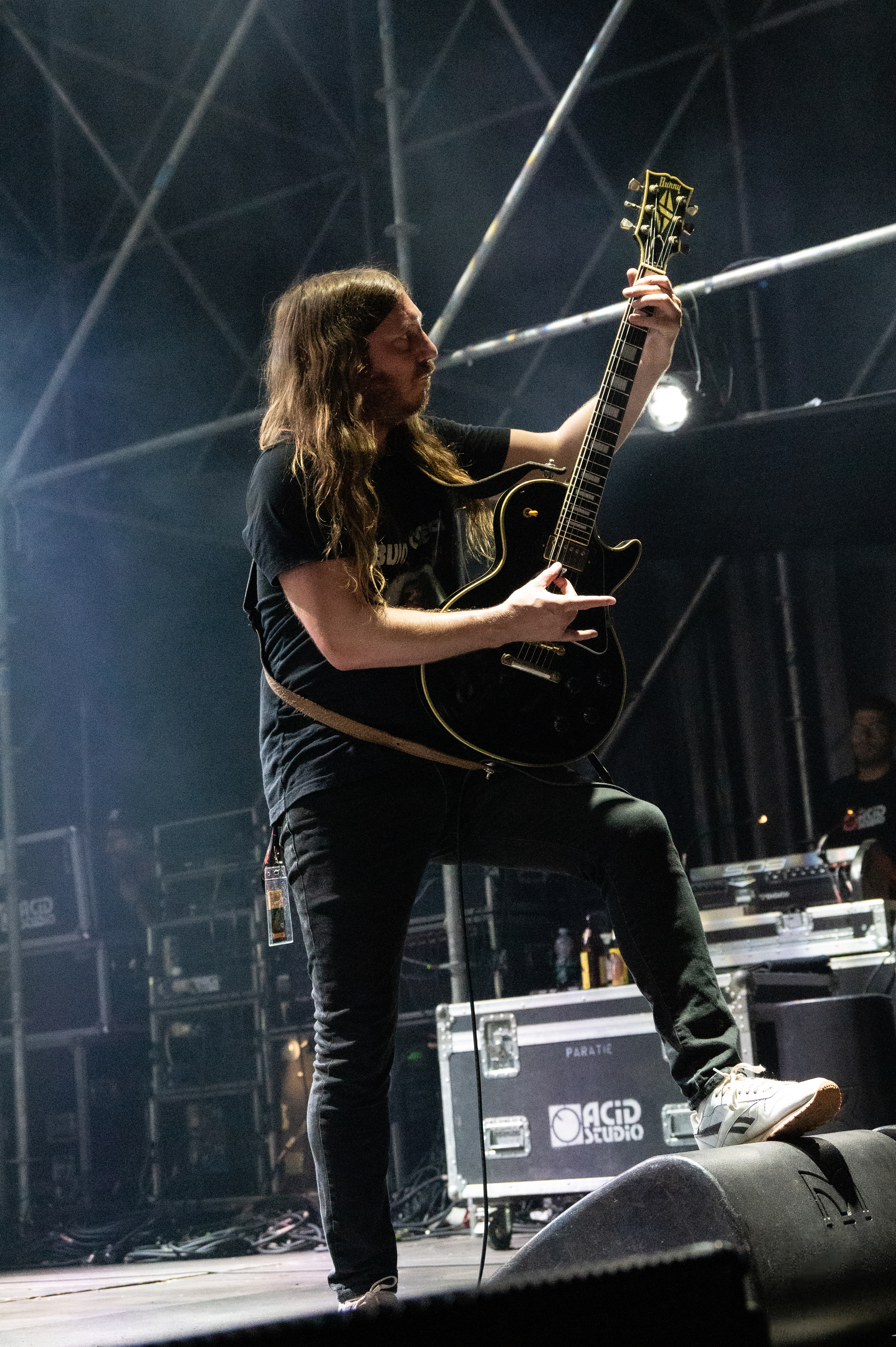
Blackford

=== Current ===
- Bill Steer – guitar (1986–1996, 2007–present), backing vocals (1986–1987, 1992–1996, 2007–present), lead vocals (1987–1992)
- Jeff Walker – bass (1986–1996, 2007–present), lead vocals (1987–1996, 2007–present), backing vocals (1986–1987)
- Daniel Wilding – drums, backing vocals (2012–present)
- James 'Nip' Blackford – guitar (2021–present)

=== Former ===
- Ken Owen – drums (1986–1996; guest in 2008, 2009, 2010, 2013), lead vocals (1987–1990), backing vocals (1990–1996)
- Sanjiv Sumner – lead vocals (1986–1987)
- Michael Amott – guitar (1990–1993, 2007–2012), backing vocals (1990–1993)
- Carlo Regadas – guitar (1994–1996)

=== Former touring musicians ===
- Mike Hickey – guitar (1993–1994)
- Daniel Erlandsson – drums (2007–2012)
- Ben Ash – guitar (2013–2018)
- Tom Draper – guitar (2018–2021)
- Waltteri Väyrynen – drums (2026; substitute for Daniel Wilding)

== Discography ==
- Reek of Putrefaction (1988)
- Symphonies of Sickness (1989)
- Necroticism – Descanting the Insalubrious (1991)
- Heartwork (1993)
- Swansong (1996)
- Surgical Steel (2013)
- Torn Arteries (2021)
