= Surgical Steel (album) =

Studio album by Carcass
- Released: 13 September 2013
- Recorded: 2013
- Studios: Chapel Studios (Derbyshire, England)
- Genres: Melodic death metal; thrash metal
- Length: 47:06
- Label: Nuclear Blast
- Producer: Colin Richardson

Carcass chronology
Choice Cuts (2004)	Surgical Steel (2013)	Surgical Remission/Surplus Steel (2014)

Singles from Surgical Steel
- 1. "Captive Bolt Pistol" Released: 2 August 2013

Surgical Steel is the sixth studio album by English extreme metal band Carcass. The album was released on 13 September 2013 in Europe, 16 September in the UK, and 17 September in North America, via Nuclear Blast. Surgical Steel is Carcass' first studio album since Swansong (1996), and their first to feature Dan Wilding as the replacement of original drummer Ken Owen, although the latter does provide backing vocals on the album. This was also the band's first album since Symphonies of Sickness (1989) to be recorded as a three-piece, and their first one to reach the Top 50 in UK album charts.

== Background ==
Carcass disbanded in 1996, prior to the release of their album Swansong. Walker, Steer, and Amott reformed in 2007 with Arch Enemy drummer Daniel Erlandsson as a live act and performed at festivals around the world for the next several years. In 2008, Steer said in an interview that a new album was unlikely due to Amott's and Walker's busy schedules. Also in 2008, Walker told Decibel that the reunion would not produce any new material, saying, "I don't see how it could ever happen, because me, Mike and Bill are all bandleaders. There'd be too many guys thinking they know better." However, in that same interview, he acknowledged that Steer had been "showing [Amott] riffs" that may lead to new songs.

While touring in 2008, Steer watched drummer Dan Wilding play and felt inspired by his similarity to former Carcass drummer Ken Owen, who had been unable to join Carcass for the reunion due to a cerebral hemorrhage he suffered in 1999. Amott and Erlandsson left the band in 2012 to focus on Arch Enemy, and Steer and Walker recruited Wilding to record Surgical Steel, which they financed independently as they had no label backing at the time.

== Promotion and release ==
The German magazine Legacy premiered the Surgical Steel song "Captive Bolt Pistol" in June 2013 on a sampler CD, titled Hell Is Here, promoting the 2013 Party.San Open Air festival. Nuclear Blast released the song as a free download on 16 July and released a 7" vinyl single the week of 9 August with "Intensive Battery Brooding" on the B-side. Carcass played a five-date North American tour in September 2013, followed by a longer tour of Europe in November 2013 with death metal band Amon Amarth. Decibel premiered "Zochrot", a song recorded during the Surgical Steel sessions, as a flexi disc included with Decibel's October 2013 issue.

Surgical Steel was released as a CD in both a standard jewel case and a digipack, and as a double-LP on black or white vinyl. Additionally, a Mail Order Edition was released exclusively by Nuclear Blast. It is a box set containing the CD in a first aid kit, and is limited to 666 copies.

The band recorded four additional songs during the Surgical Steel sessions that were not included on the standard edition of the album: "A Wraith in the Apparatus", "Intensive Battery Brooding", "Zochrot", and "Livestock Marketplace". Additional songs were released on 11 November 2014 (North America), 14 November (rest of Europe) and 17 November (UK) on an EP titled Surgical Remission/Surplus Steel. The EP is available on physical and digital formats. Surgical Steel Complete Edition version of the album was released in 2015, combining the base album and the Surgical Remission/Surplus Steel EP into one package.

== Critical reception ==
Professional ratings
Aggregate scores
Source	Rating
Metacritic	86/100
Review scores
Source	Rating
AllMusic	4/5 stars
Brave Words & Bloody Knuckles	10/10
Blabbermouth.net	9/10
Loudwire	3.5/5 stars
Metal Forces	8/10
PopMatters	9/10
Pitchfork	7.9/10
Record Collector	4/5 stars

Chris Dick of Decibel praised the album as a worthy addition to the band's discography, noting that the album has a more aggressive first half and more melodic and riff-driven second half. Dick wrote, "Surgical Steel isn't just an unfeigned return to form; it's a verifiably vicious one". Mike Kemp of Terrorizer opined that the record wasn't a reinvention of the band's familiar sound, nor "a rehash of past glories". Instead, he called it a "bloody great death metal album" which fulfilled his expectations.

In a positive review on the website Invisible Oranges, Alee Karim described the album's "machine-gun-picking strafes, heavy mid-tempo stomps, [and] virtuosic yet hooky Thin Lizzy-esque twin-guitar harmonies" and said, "This may not end up being your favorite Carcass album [...] but it may be objectively the best realization of their sound." Hank Shteamer of Pitchfork called Surgical Steel "a nostalgic statement" that was "enjoyable". He also praised the musicians on the album, such as the "outstanding playing from Steer", "some of the tightest drumming in the band's discography", and called Walker "the star of the record".

Surgical Steel was named 2013's Album of the Year by several metal magazines and websites, including Metal Assault, Decibel Magazine, and MetalSucks, who would later in 2019 go on to rank Surgical Steel as the 2nd best Metal Album of the '10s.

== Track listing ==
All lyrics are written by Jeffrey Walker; all music is composed by Bill Steer, Walker and Daniel Wilding.

No.	Title	Length
1.	"1985" (instrumental)	1:15
2.	"Thrasher's Abattoir"	1:50
3.	"Cadaver Pouch Conveyor System"	4:02
4.	"A Congealed Clot of Blood"	4:13
5.	"The Master Butcher's Apron"	4:00
6.	"Noncompliance to ASTM F899-12 Standard"	6:06
7.	"The Granulating Dark Satanic Mills"	4:10
8.	"Unfit for Human Consumption"	4:24
9.	"316L Grade Surgical Steel"	5:10
10.	"Captive Bolt Pistol"	3:16
11.	"Mount of Execution"	8:25
Total length:		47:06

Digipak edition bonus track
No.	Title	Length
12.	"Intensive Battery Brooding"	4:43
Total length:		51:49

Japanese edition bonus tracks
No.	Title	Length
12.	"A Wraith in the Apparatus"	3:30
13.	"Intensive Battery Brooding"	4:46
Total length:		55:19

== Personnel ==
Carcass

- Jeffrey Walker – bass, lead vocals
- Bill Steer – guitars, backing vocals
- Daniel Wilding – drums

Additional musician

- Ken Owen – backing vocals
- Chris Gardner – backing vocals

Production

- Colin Richardson – production
- Carl Bown – engineering
- Andy Sneap – mixing, mastering
- Martin Nesbitt – cover art (original)
- Mircea Gabriel Eftemie – artwork (additional)
- Jeffrey Walker – artwork (additional)
- Rob Kimura – layout
- Adrian Erlandsson – photography (band)
- Ian T Tilton – photography (album sleeve)

== Charts ==
Chart	Peak position
Australian Albums (ARIA)	59
Austrian Albums (Ö3 Austria)	24
Belgian Albums (Ultratop Flanders)	69
Belgian Albums (Ultratop Wallonia)	87
Dutch Albums (Album Top 100)	73
Finnish Albums (Suomen virallinen lista)	6
French Albums (SNEP)	82
German Albums (Offizielle Top 100)	10
Hungarian Albums (MAHASZ)	22
Irish Albums (IRMA)	84
Scottish Albums (Official Charts)	39
Swedish Albums (Sverigetopplistan)	42
UK Albums (Official Charts)	47
UK Independent Albums (Official Charts)	13
UK Rock & Metal Albums (Official Charts)	4
US Billboard 200	41
