= Ken Owen =

British drummer

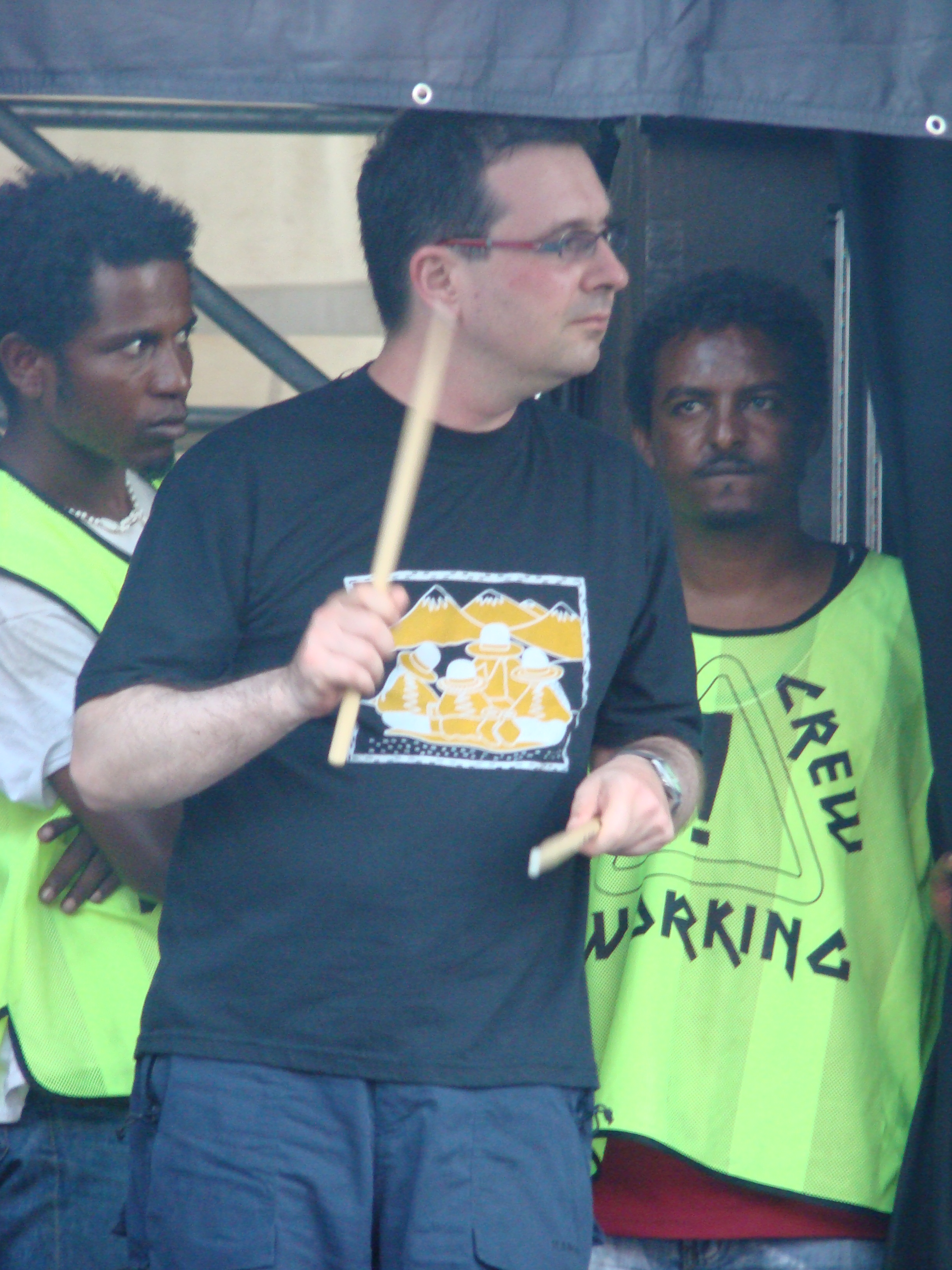
- Owen in 2009

Background information
- Also known as: Grume Gargler and Eviscerator of Matured Neoplasm (as listed on Reek of Putrefaction)
- Born: Kenneth Malcolm Owen; 23 April 1970 (age 56); Billinge Higher End, England
- Genres: Grindcore, death metal, technical death metal, melodic death metal, techno
- Occupation: Musician
- Instruments: Drums, vocals
- Years active: 1985–1999, 2008–present (occasional only)
- Formerly of: Carcass, Blackstar

Kenneth Malcolm Owen (born 23 April 1970) is an English drummer. He was born in Billinge and grew up in Gayton, Merseyside. He is best known as one of the founding members of extreme metal band Carcass, for which he also handled some of the vocals. After the band broke up in 1995, he started Blackstar, along with two other Carcass members.

== Personal life ==
He remains close to Carcass and its members: in 2008, he joined Carcass on stage at the Sweden Rock Festival 2008, Wacken Open Air festival 2008, Damnation Festival 2008 & 2013, 2009 at Bloodstock Open Air and in 2010 at Vagos Open Air to play a short drum solo. Jeff Walker has noted Owen's influence on the album Surgical Steel; Owen appears on the album contributing some backing vocals, as well as in the music video for Unfit for Human Consumption. In September 2015, he released his first solo album, Symbiotic Possibilities, which is a techno album recorded using Reason Studios software. In 2021, Carcass released their album Torn Arteries, which is named after a fictional band by Owen during his teenage years.

=== Health issues ===
In February 1999, he suffered a brain haemorrhage at home and spent ten months in a hospital slowly emerging from a coma, making it impossible at the time for him to continue playing drums. More recently, he has started playing drums again, but mostly makes music using the computer software program Reason Studios.

== Discography ==
- Reek of Putrefaction (1988)
- Symphonies of Sickness (1989)
- Necroticism – Descanting the Insalubrious (1991)
- Heartwork (1993)
- Swansong (1996)
