= Bill Steer =

British guitarist

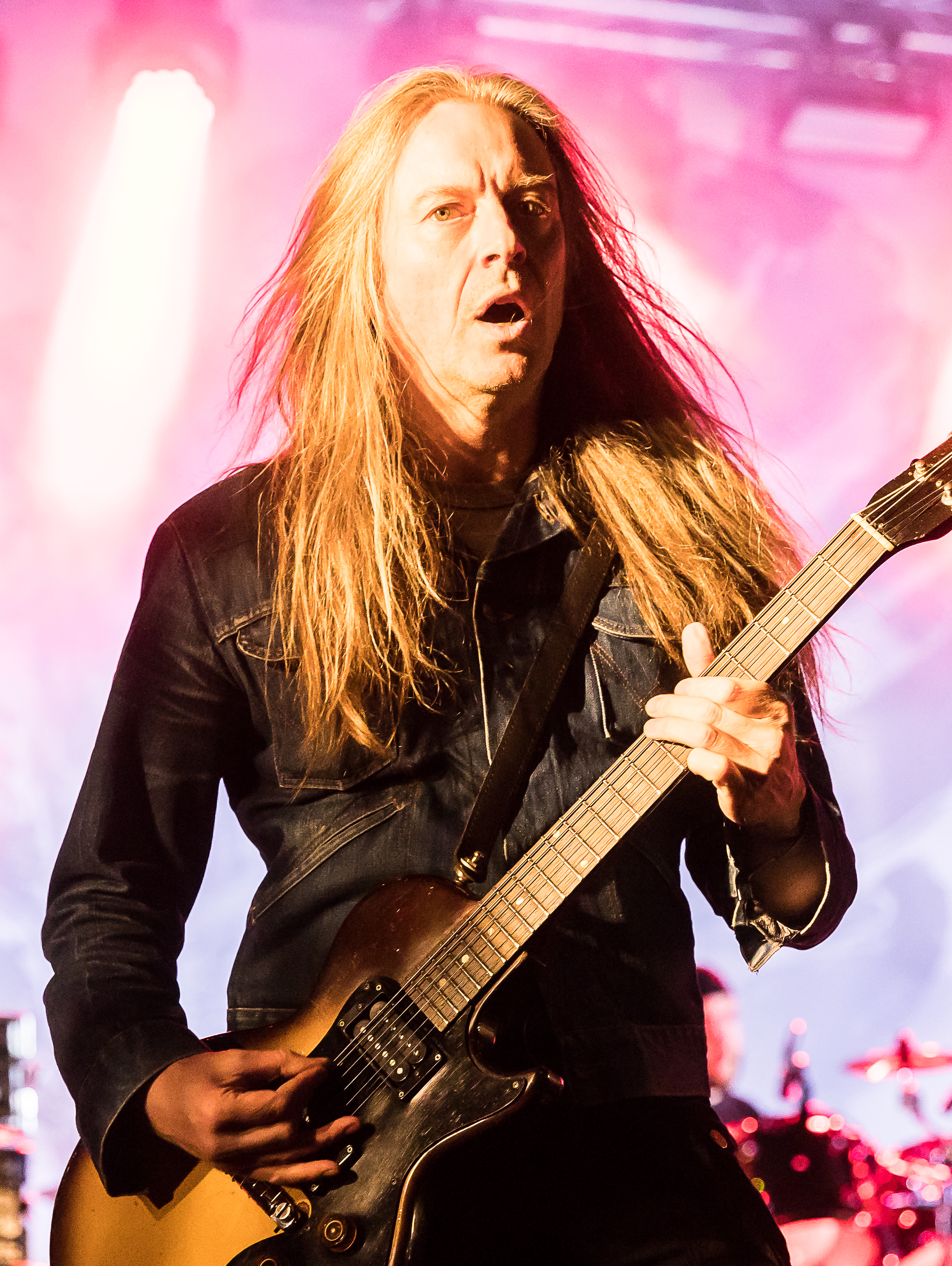
- Steer performing with Carcass in 2024

Background information
- Born: William Geoffrey Steer; 3 December 1969 (age 56)
- Origin: Stockton-on-Tees, England
- Genres: Death metal, heavy metal, melodic death metal, blues rock, stoner rock, grindcore, goregrind
- Occupation: Musician
- Instruments: Guitar, vocals
- Years active: 1985–present
- Member of: Carcass, Gentlemans Pistols
- Formerly of: Disattack, Napalm Death, Firebird

William Geoffrey Steer (born 3 December 1969) is a British guitarist and co-founder of the extreme metal band Carcass. He is considered a pioneer and an essential contributor to grindcore and death metal due to his involvement in Napalm Death and Carcass, two of the most important bands of those genres. Presently he plays with Gentlemans Pistols, the reactivated Carcass and appeared as a live second guitarist for Angel Witch from 2011 to 2015.

The style of Steer's guitar work on early Napalm Death releases has been described as a "frenzied, distorted blur".

== Biography ==
Born in Stockton-on-Tees to a Scottish mother and English father, Steer spent his teenage years on the Wirral. According to various interviews, it was at this time he was exposed to hard rock and heavy metal in the form of Motörhead, Deep Purple, Black Sabbath, UFO, Iron Maiden, Led Zeppelin and so on, followed by lesser-known NWOBHM artists such as Raven, Tank and Venom. These years saw Steer begin playing electric guitar and also becoming one of the earliest tape traders in the UK, immersing himself in the embryonic underground death metal scene. During this time, an early incarnation of Carcass was formed.

Steer appeared in Guitar magazine's "Best Ten Guitarists You've Never Heard Of" in 1996, was featured in Metal Hammer's "Greatest Metal Guitar Players" and was ranked no.3 in Decibel Magazine's "Top Twenty Death Metal Guitarists" as well as No. 92 out of 100 Greatest Heavy Metal Guitarists of All Time by Guitar World.

He was guitarist for Napalm Death from April 1987 – July 1989, appearing on their first two albums as well as the BBC Radio One John Peel Sessions. Throughout this period the group toured across the UK and Europe, only for Steer and vocalist Lee Dorrian to quit immediately after a tour of Japan. He played in Carcass from 1985 to 1995, the only guitarist to feature on all of the band's albums and perform throughout their live career. After the demise of Carcass he moved to Australia and developed a passion for blues music, teaching himself harmonica and slide guitar. Upon returning to the UK, Steer started his own band Firebird, which was mainly inspired by 1970s rock. During this time he was married and then divorced. Firebird split up in late 2011. Steer plays guitar in the band Gentlemans Pistols and has also performed with a new wave of British heavy metal veterans Angel Witch. He currently resides in east London.

Steer also appeared along with Jeffrey Walker (bassist/vocalist of Carcass) in an episode of the Sci-Fi comedy Red Dwarf. He performed as the drummer of the band Smeg and the Heads named Dobbin in series 3 episode 5 "Timeslides".

In addition to Steer's guitar prowess, he is well known for Jeff Walker's naming of his solos on earlier Carcass albums (example: "Maim to Please" by W. G. Steer from Tools of the Trade).

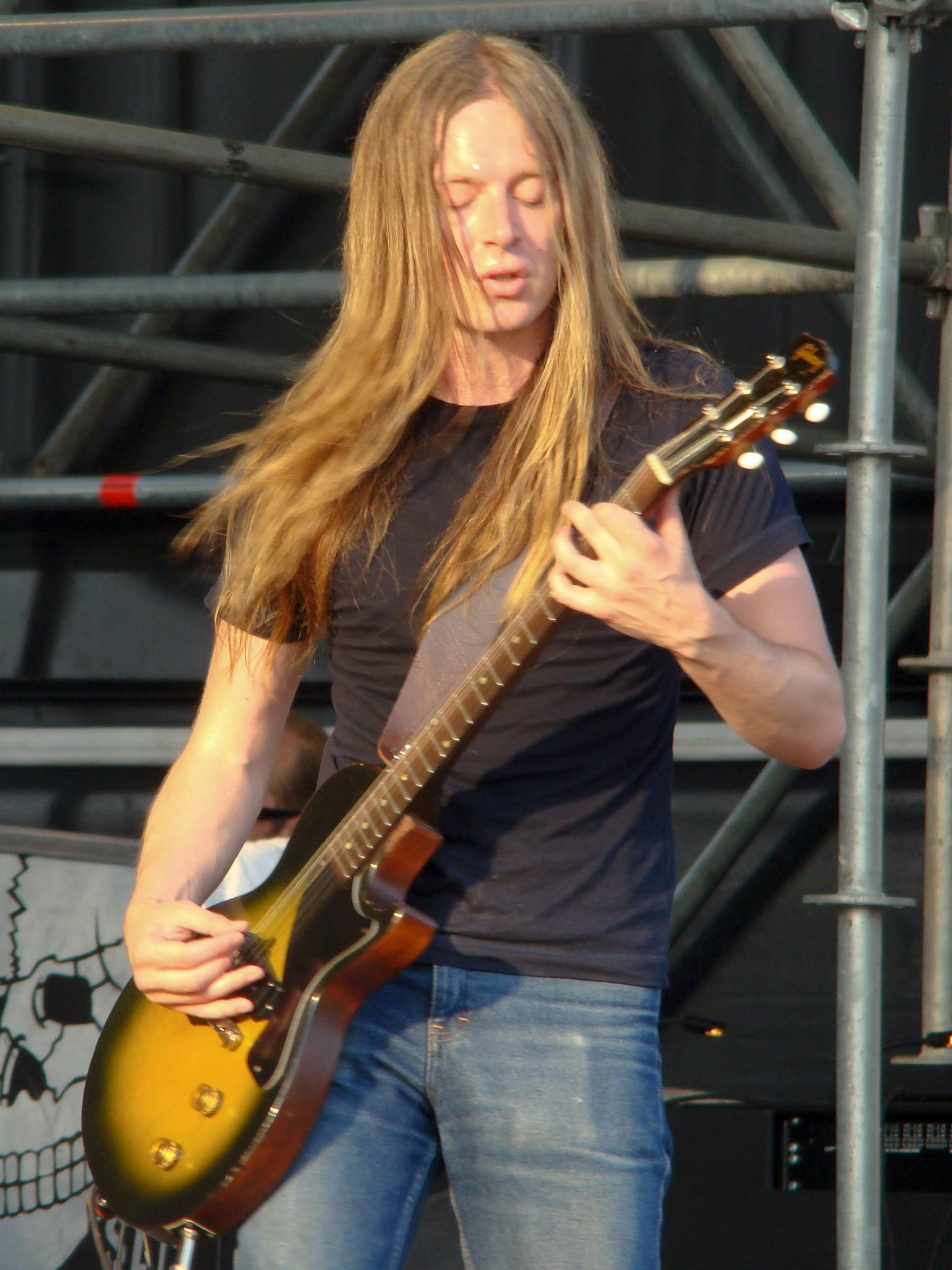
Steer in 2008

In 2008 Steer reunited with his Carcass bandmates (except for drummer Ken Owen, who suffered a cerebral haemorrhage in 1999; Daniel Erlandsson was tapped to play drums in his place) to play at several European festivals such as Wacken '08. In an interview, Steer mentioned that a new Carcass album could hardly be possible. The Carcass reunion show schedule continued through to 2010, playing festivals and headlining a small US tour in 2009. In 2010, Steer briefly hosted a show at the Internet radio station, TotalRock. Since then, besides playing in various bands, including Angel Witch, he has been involved in the "Friday Night Powerhouse" club in London.

Carcass started rehearsing again in May 2012, and played at the Maryland Deathfest XI music festival in May 2013. In mid-2013, the band released Surgical Steel, on which Steer played lead guitars with some backing vocals.

Steer plays old Gibson Les Paul guitars (primarily Juniors and Customs), and uses vintage fifty-watt Marshall amplifiers. In his Disattack years he played a Gibson Les Paul. He also used a red Squire Fender Strat in the very early Carcass era; this guitar was also played on the first Napalm Death album before he switched to a white Schecter Strategy in January or February 1988. He has used this Schecter on the first two albums and subsequent Napalm Death recordings (until it was stolen from his parents' residence during a burglary), a black Ibanez S540LTD on Necroticism, a Peavey Nitro III, and on the Heartwork album he used Marshall SL-X and anniversary heads as well as the Peavey 5150. In Napalm Death, he used a H&H VS Musician transistor combo amp and a Boss DS-1 distortion pedal. Steer has also used ESP Eclipse model guitars. In recent years he has avoided endorsements.

Steer has been a vegetarian since 1986 and was also vegan for a period of time.

Steer married his long-term girlfriend in the summer of 2021.
