= Jeff Walker (musician) =

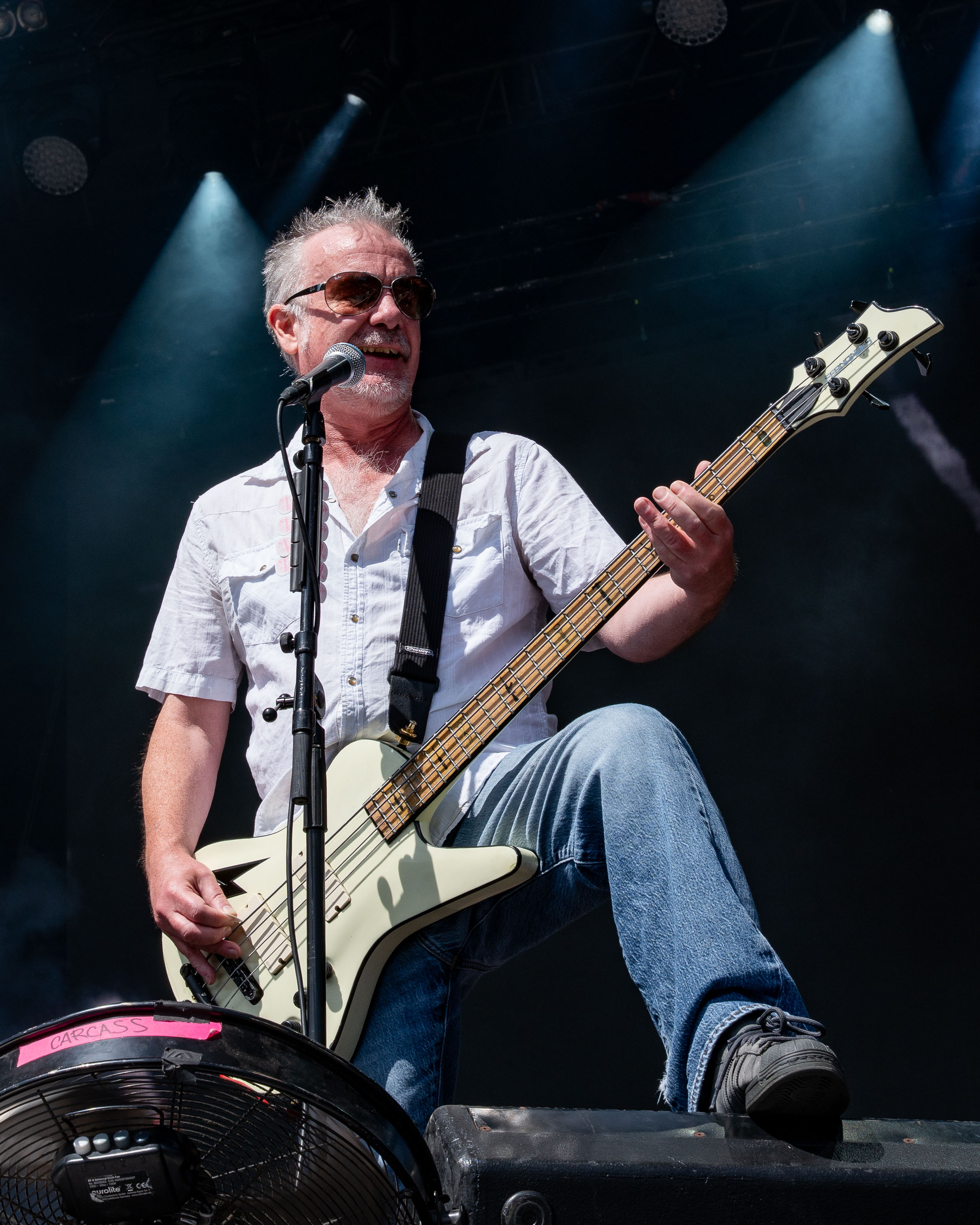
- Walker performing with Carcass in 2025

Background information
- Also known as: El Cynico
- Born: Jeffrey Walker; 25 March 1969 (age 57)
- Origin: St Helens, England
- Genres: Death metal; melodic death metal; hard rock; grindcore; thrashcore (early)
- Occupations: Musician; songwriter
- Instruments: Vocals; bass; guitar
- Years active: 1985–present

Jeffrey Walker (born 25 March 1969) is an English musician, best known as the bassist and lead vocalist of extreme metal band Carcass, for which he also serves as the primary lyricist. Before Carcass, he played in English thrashcore band Electro Hippies as guitarist and vocalist. After the initial demise of Carcass, he went on to form the hard rock band Blackstar with two former Carcass bandmates, and joined American grindcore supergroup, Brujeria. Loudwire placed him at number 22 on their list of Top 25 Extreme Metal Vocalists.

== Biography ==
He created the cover artwork for a few albums, including Scum by Napalm Death. He is also credited for the cover art to the cult Axegrinder album Rise of the Serpent Men. He also designed Diamanthian's (a Liverpool based death metal band) logo, as well as producing their debut album.

Whilst in Liverpool, Walker was well known amongst radical animal rights activists, especially for his work as a hunt saboteur.

Jeff along with Bill Steer ran the short-lived record label Necrosis, which was an imprint of Carcass' label Earache Records and that signed bands such as Norwegian group Cadaver and Repulsion from the USA. Jeff Walker also reputedly painted the cover of one of the editions of Repulsion's Horrified.

Walker also appeared in an episode of the science fiction comedy Red Dwarf. He performed as 'Gazza', a 'neo-Marxist nihilist anarchist', the bassist of the band 'Smeg and the Heads' in the 1989 episode "Timeslides" along with Carcass bandmate Bill Steer as the "whacked-out crazy hippy drummer" 'Dobbin'.

A solo album, Welcome to Carcass Cuntry, was released on 9 May 2006 on Fractured Transmitter Records under the moniker Jeff Walker Und Die Fluffers. The album consists of covers of country/blues songs with a metallic twist. Various guest appearances on the album including former bandmates Ken Owen and Bill Steer, as well as members of the band HIM.

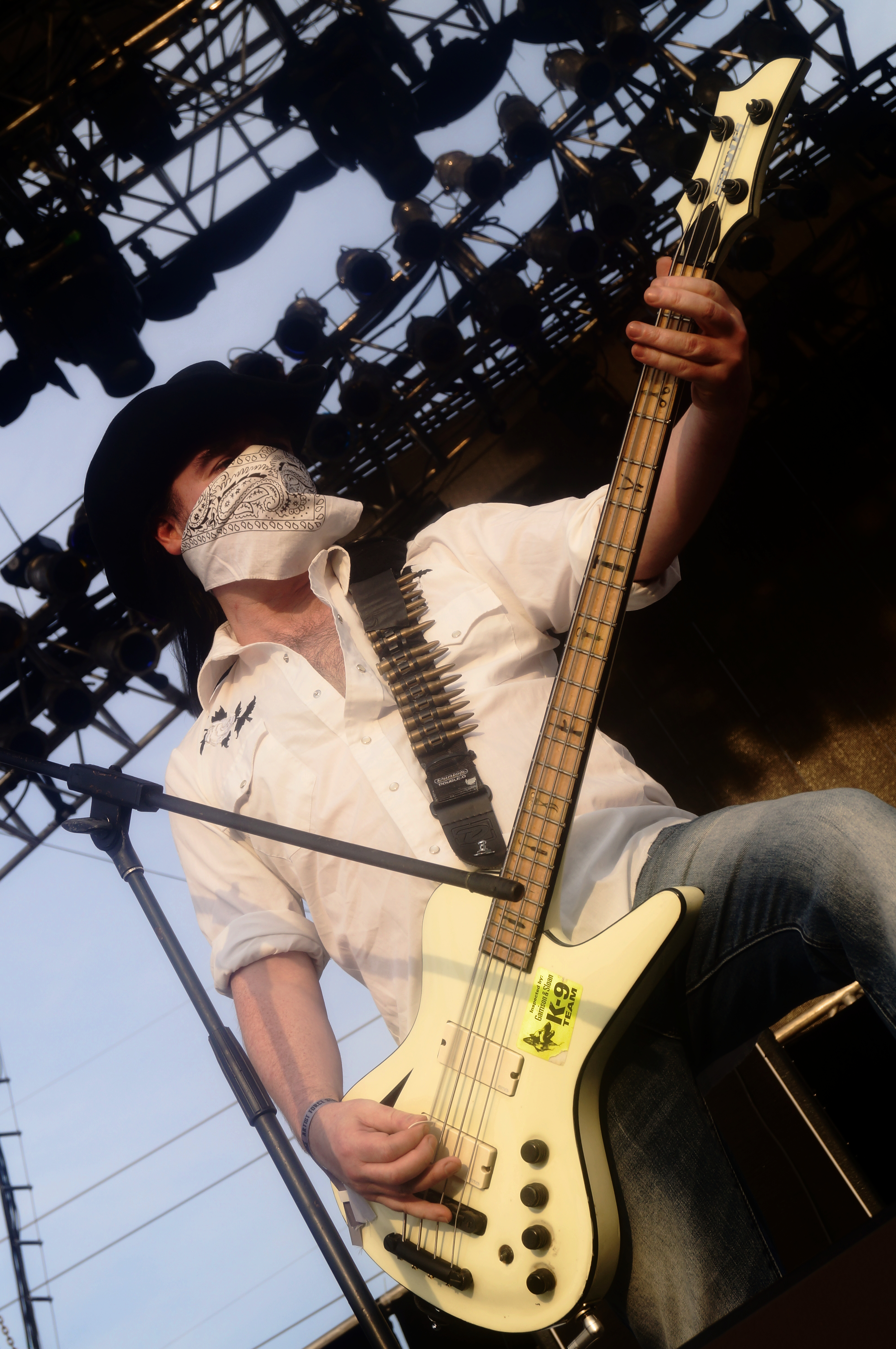
Walker as "El Cynico" with Brujeria in 2015

In 2006, he joined American/Mexican death metal and grindcore supergroup, Brujeria, under the pseudonym El Cynico. He has played on their albums Pocho Aztlan (2016) and Esto Es Brujeria (2023) and played live with them until 2017.

Walker appeared as a guest singer on Napalm Death's The Code Is Red...Long Live the Code album, on the track "Pledge Yourself to You". He has also worked with This Is Menace, singing on the tracks "Onward Christian Soldiers" and "Pretty Girls", while also supplying vocals to Mnemic's "Psykorgasm". He has appeared live with the Finnish grindcore band To Separate the Flesh from the Bones.
