= List of Arch Enemy band members =

Swedish melodic death metal band members

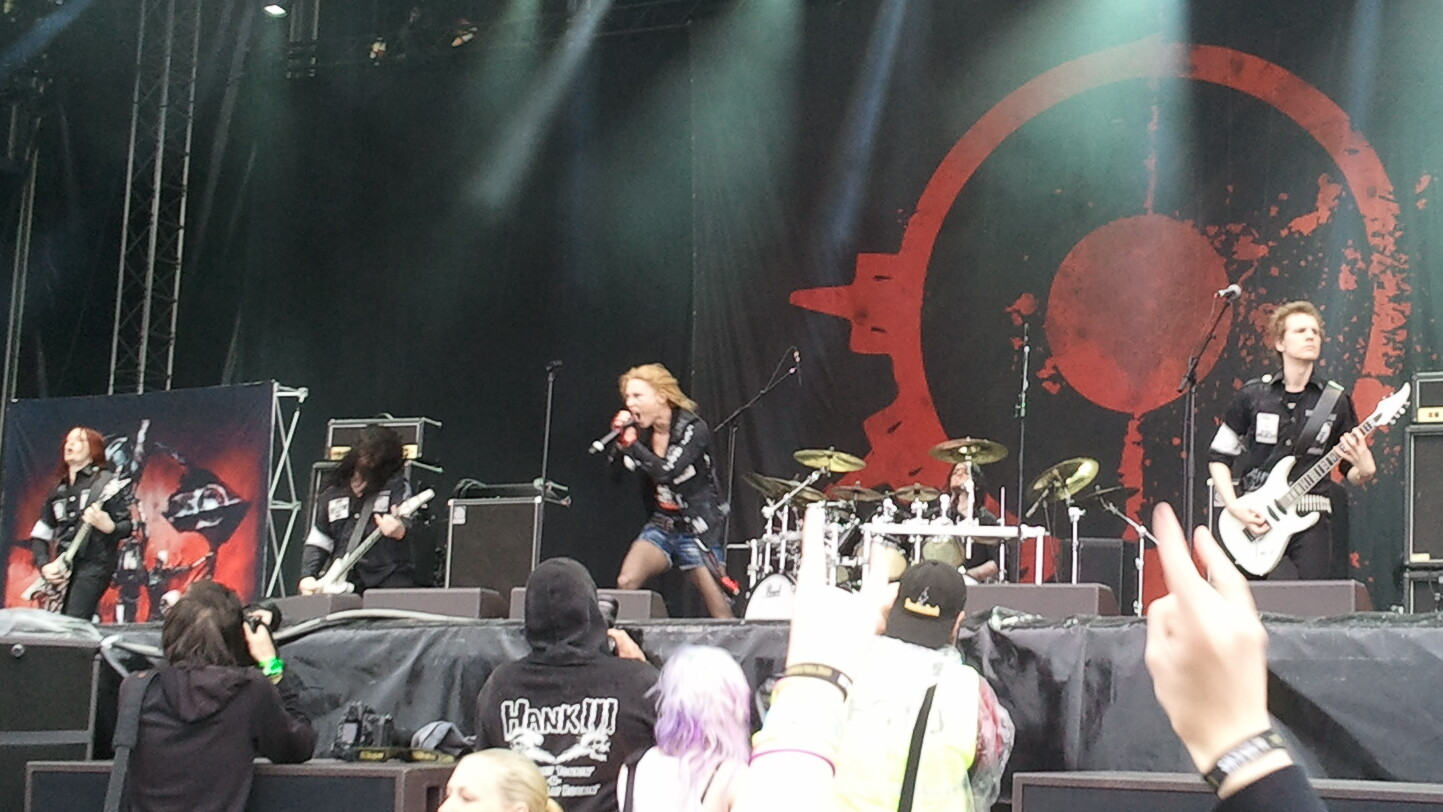
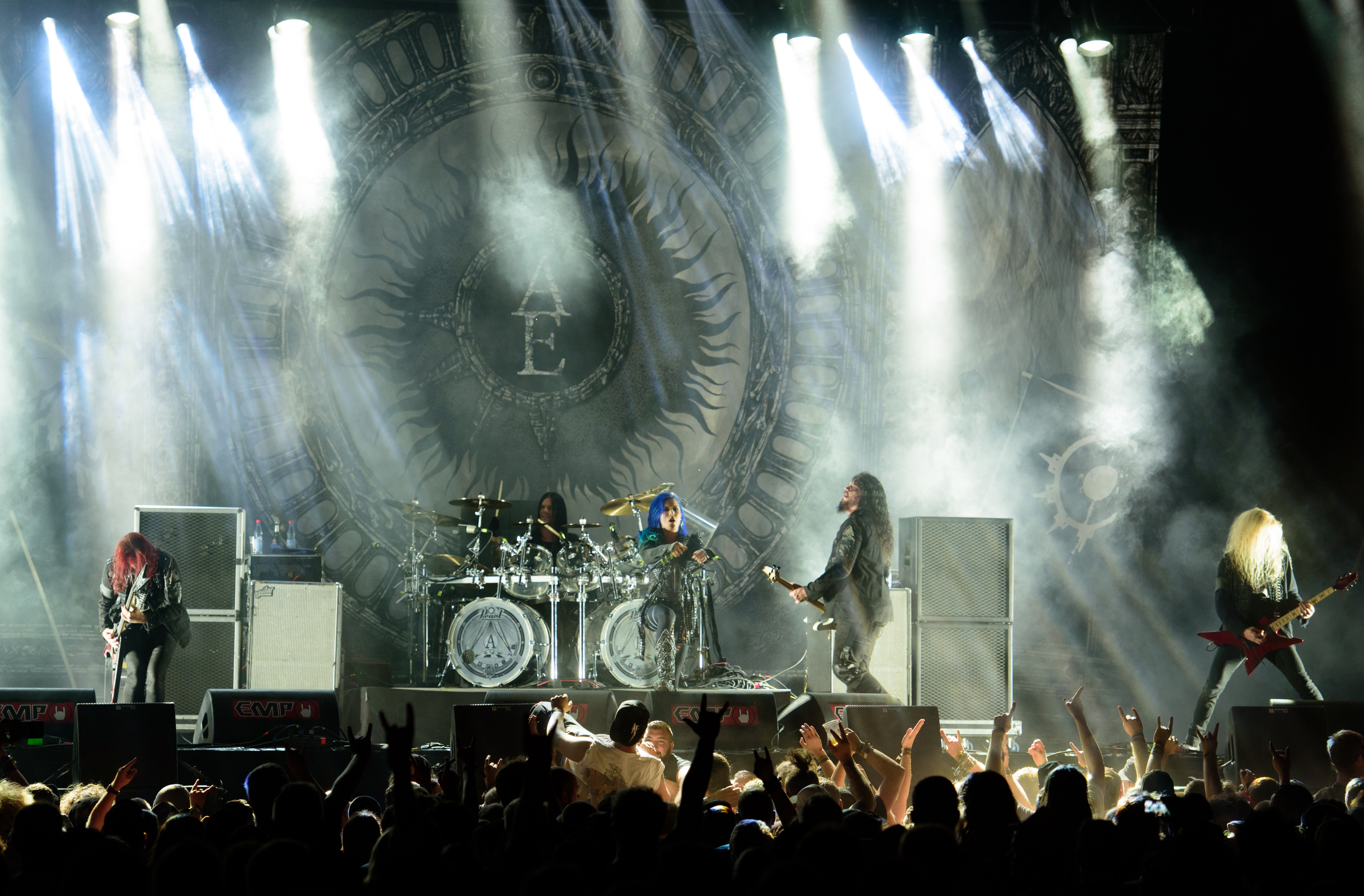
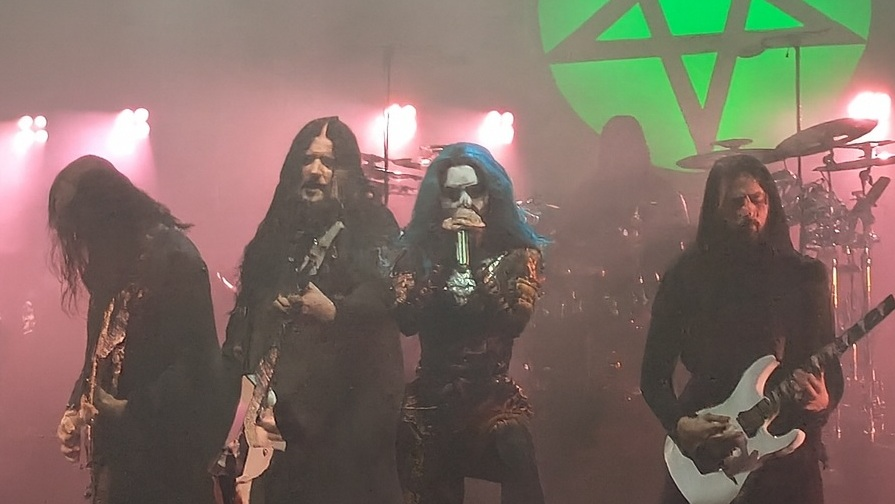
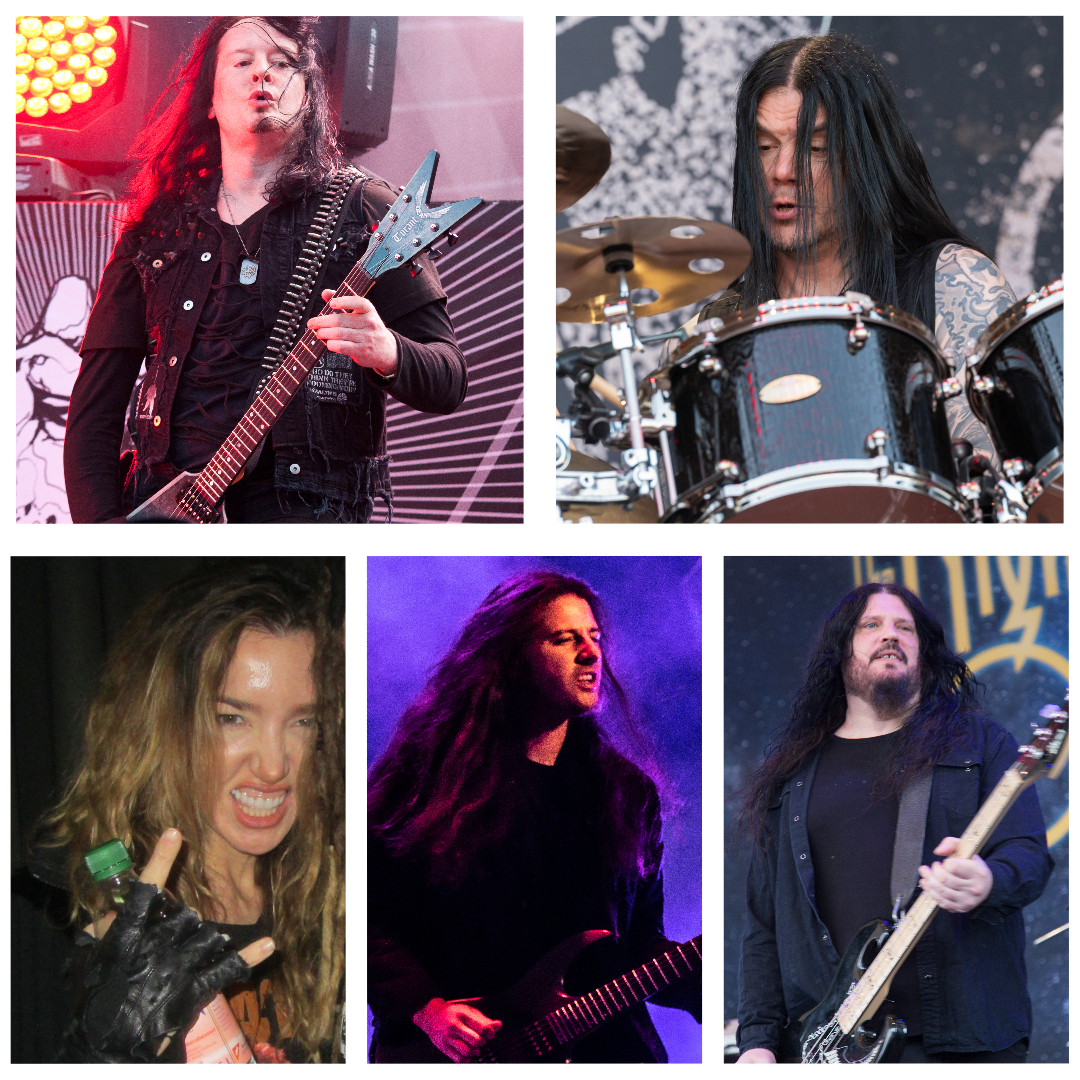
Three line-ups of Arch Enemy performing in 2011, 2016 and 2025, as well as the current lineup since 2026

Arch Enemy are a Swedish melodic death metal band founded by guitarist Michael Amott in 1995. The band's original line-up included Amott on guitar and bass, his brother Christopher on guitar, vocalist Johan Liiva and drummer Daniel Erlandsson. The band currently consists of Michael Amott, and Erlandsson alongside bassist Sharlee D'Angelo (since 1999), guitarist Joey Concepcion (since 2023) and vocalist Lauren Hart (since 2026).

== History ==
The band's debut album, Black Earth, was recorded in nine days in February and March 1996. Amott played bass despite Liiva being credited with the instrument. For the band's second album, Stigmata (1998), the band were joined by bassist Martin Bengtsson and drummer Peter Wildoer. By 1999, Erlandsson returned and Sharlee D'Angelo took over on bass, although during the touring cycle for Burning Bridges (1999) the band were joined by bassists Dick Lövgren and Roger Nilsson.

Liiva left Arch Enemy in 2000, he was replaced by German vocalist Angela Gossow. In 2005, Christopher Amott left the band in order to focus on his personal life. Gus G. joined as his temporary replacement before Fredrik Åkesson joined more permanently. Christopher returned to the band in 2007, but he would leave again in 2012 to focus on his solo career, he was replaced by Nick Cordle.

In 2014, Gossow left the band to focus on family, she was replaced by Canadian vocalist Alissa White-Gluz, on Gossow's suggestion. Also in 2014, Cordle left the band mid show, Chris Amott subsequently returned as fill in before Jeff Loomis joined as permanent guitarist.

On 10 October 2015, Liiva and Christopher Amott returned to the band for a one off reunion appearance at Japan’s Loud Park festival.

Loomis stayed with the band until December 2023, when he was replaced by Joey Concepcion. In November 2025, White-Gluz left the band, shifting focus to her solo career. In February 2026, Lauren Hart was announced as the new lead vocalist.

== Members ==
=== Current ===
Image	Name	Years active	Instruments	Release contributions
	Michael Amott	1995–present	guitars; backing vocals; bass (1995–1997, 1998); keyboards	all releases
	Daniel Erlandsson	1995–1997; 1998–present	drums; keyboards	all releases
	Sharlee D'Angelo	1999–present	bass	all releases from Burning Bridges (1999) onwards
	Joey Concepcion	2023–present (substitute 2018)	guitars; backing vocals	all releases from Blood Dynasty (2025) onwards
	Lauren Hart	2026–present	lead vocals	"To the Last Breath" (2026)

=== Former ===
Image	Name	Years active	Instruments	Release contributions
	Christopher Amott	1995–2005; 2007–2012 (touring member 2014, guest 2015, 2016)	guitars; backing vocals	all releases from Black Earth (1996) to Khaos Legions (2011); Will to Power (2017) one track; Deceivers (2022) songwriting
	Johan Liiva	1995−2000 (guest 2015)	lead vocals	all releases from Black Earth (1996) to Wages of Sin (2001) disc 2
	Martin Bengtsson	1997–1998	bass	Stigmata (1998)
	Peter Wildoer	1997–1998	drums	Stigmata (1998)
	Angela Gossow	2000–2014 (now manager of the band)	lead vocals	all releases from Wages of Sin (2001) to Khaos Legions (2011)
	Fredrik Åkesson	2005–2007	guitars; backing vocals	Live Apocalypse (DVD, 2006)
	Nick Cordle	2012–2014	guitars; backing vocals	War Eternal (2014)
	Alissa White-Gluz	2014–2025	lead vocals	all releases from War Eternal (2014) to Blood Dynasty (2025)
	Jeff Loomis	2014−2023	guitars; backing vocals	all releases from Stolen Life EP (2015) to Deceivers (2022)

=== Touring ===
Image	Name	Years active	Instruments	Notes
	Dick Lövgren	1999	bass	Lövgren and Nilsson served as touring bassists for the Burning Bridges touring cycle.
	Roger Nilsson	1999–2000	bass	Lövgren and Nilsson served as touring bassists for the Burning Bridges touring cycle.
	Gus G (Konstantinos Karamitroudis)	2005	guitars; backing vocals	Karamitroudis joined as temporary replacement following the departure of Christopher Amott. He also played the second guitar solo on "Taking Back My Soul" from Doomsday Machine (2005).
	Hank Lin	2026	drums	Lin played three shows as a replacement for Daniel Erlandsson due to illness.

=== Session ===
Image	Name	Years active	Instruments	Release contributions
	Fredrik Nordström	1996–2000	keyboards; piano	Black Earth (1996); Stigmata (1998); Covered in Blood (2019)
	Per Wiberg	1997–2004; 2007; 2010–2011; 2013–2014	mellotron; piano; keyboards	Stigmata (1998); Wages of Sin (2001); Anthems of Rebellion (2003); Dead Eyes See No Future (2004); Rise of the Tyrant (2007); Revolution Begins (2007); Khaos Legions (2011); War Eternal (2014); Covered in Blood (2019)
	Ola Strömberg	2005	keyboards	Doomsday Machine (2005)
	Apollo Papathanasio	2005	backing vocals	Doomsday Machine (2005)
	Mikkel Sandager	2010–2011	backing vocals	Khaos Legions (2011)
	Henrik Janson	2013–2014; 2016–2017	orchestration; string arrangements	War Eternal (2014); Will to Power (2017)
	Ulf Janson	2013–2014; 2016–2017	keyboards; orchestration; string arrangements	War Eternal (2014); Will to Power (2017)
	Jens Johansson	2016–2017	keyboards	Will to Power (2017)
	Ulf Forsberg	2016–2017	violin	Will to Power (2017)
	Christian Bergqvist	2016–2017	violin	Will to Power (2017)
	Per Öman	2016–2017	violin	Will to Power (2017)
	Ulrika Jansson	2016–2017	violin	Will to Power (2017)
	Bo Söderström	2016–2017	violin	Will to Power (2017)
	Torbjörn Bernhardsson	2016–2017	violin	Will to Power (2017)
	Tony Bauer	2016–2017	viola	Will to Power (2017)
	Riikka Repo	2016–2017	viola	Will to Power (2017)
	Johanna Sjunnesson	2016–2017	cello	Will to Power (2017)
	Raphael Liebermann	2022; 2024	cello	Deceivers (2022); Blood Dynasty (2025)
	Francesco Ferrini	2024	keyboards; orchestrations	Blood Dynasty (2025)

== Line-ups ==
Period	Members	Releases
1995 – 1996	Michael Amott – guitars, bass; Christopher Amott – guitars; Johan Liiva – vocals; Daniel Erlandsson – drums	Black Earth (1996); Stigmata (1998) two tracks
1997 – 1998	Michael Amott – guitars; Christopher Amott – guitars; Johan Liiva – vocals; Martin Bengtsson – bass; Peter Wildoer – drums	Stigmata (1998) remaining tracks
1998	Michael Amott – guitars; Christopher Amott – guitars; Johan Liiva – vocals; Martin Bengtsson – bass; Daniel Erlandsson – drums	Stigmata (1998) two tracks
1998 – November 2000	Michael Amott – guitars, backing vocals; Christopher Amott – guitars, backing vocals; Johan Liiva – lead vocals; Daniel Erlandsson – drums; Sharlee D'Angelo – bass	Burning Bridges (1999); Burning Japan Live 1999 (2000)
November 2000 – August 2005	Michael Amott – guitars, backing vocals; Christopher Amott – guitars, backing vocals; Daniel Erlandsson – drums; Sharlee D'Angelo – bass; Angela Gossow – lead vocals	Wages of Sin (2001); Burning Angel (2002); Anthems of Rebellion (2003); Dead Eyes See No Future (2004); Doomsday Machine (2005); Live Apocalypse (DVD, 2006)
August – October 2005	Michael Amott – guitars, backing vocals; Daniel Erlandsson – drums; Sharlee D'Angelo – bass; Angela Gossow – lead vocals; Gus G – guitars, backing vocals (touring)	none
October 2005 – March 2007	Michael Amott – guitars, backing vocals; Daniel Erlandsson – drums; Sharlee D'Angelo – bass; Angela Gossow – lead vocals; Fredrik Akesson – guitars, backing vocals	Live Apocalypse (DVD, 2006) three tracks; Revolution Begins (2007) one track
March 2007 – March 2012	Michael Amott – guitars, backing vocals; Daniel Erlandsson – drums; Sharlee D'Angelo – bass; Angela Gossow – lead vocals; Christopher Amott – guitars, backing vocals	Rise of the Tyrant (2007); Revolution Begins (2007); Tyrants of the Rising Sun (2008); Khaos Legions (2011)
March 2012 – March 2014	Michael Amott – guitars, backing vocals; Daniel Erlandsson – drums; Sharlee D'Angelo – bass; Angela Gossow – lead vocals; Nick Cordle – guitars, backing vocals	none
March – 10 November 2014	Michael Amott – guitars, backing vocals; Daniel Erlandsson – drums; Sharlee D'Angelo – bass; Nick Cordle – guitars, backing vocals; Alissa White-Gluz – lead vocals	War Eternal (2014)
11 – 16 November 2014	Michael Amott – guitars, backing vocals; Daniel Erlandsson – drums; Sharlee D'Angelo – bass; Alissa White-Gluz – lead vocals; Christopher Amott – guitars, backing vocals (touring)	none
17 November 2014 – December 2023	Michael Amott – guitars, backing vocals; Daniel Erlandsson – drums; Sharlee D'Angelo – bass; Alissa White-Gluz – lead vocals; Jeff Loomis – guitars, backing vocals	Stolen Life (2015); War Eternal Tour: Tokyo Sacrifice (2016); Will to Power (2017); Råpunk (2017) without Loomis; As the Stages Burn! (2017); Deceivers (2022)
December 2023 – November 2025	Michael Amott – guitars, backing vocals; Daniel Erlandsson – drums; Sharlee D'Angelo – bass; Alissa White-Gluz – lead vocals; Joey Concepcion – guitars, backing vocals	Blood Dynasty (2025)
February 2026 – present	Michael Amott – guitars, backing vocals; Daniel Erlandsson – drums; Sharlee D'Angelo – bass; Joey Concepcion – guitars, backing vocals; Lauren Hart – lead vocals	"To the Last Breath" (2026) single
