= Manifesto of Arch Enemy =

Compilation album by Arch Enemy
- Released: 27 February 2009
- Genre: Melodic death metal
- Length: 44:48
- Label: Century Media
- Producer: Arch Enemy Andy Sneap Fredrik Nordström Rickard Bengtsson

Arch Enemy chronology
Rise of the Tyrant (2007)	Manifesto of Arch Enemy (2009)	The Root of All Evil (2009)

Manifesto of Arch Enemy is a compilation album by Swedish melodic death metal band Arch Enemy, featuring two songs from Wages of Sin, two from Anthems of Rebellion, two from Doomsday Machine, two from Rise of the Tyrant, and two from the live album Tyrants of the Rising Sun. It was released on 27 February 2009 on Century Media Records.

== Track listing ==
No.	Title	Length
1.	"Nemesis"	4:12
2.	"We Will Rise"	4:07
3.	"Revolution Begins"	4:11
4.	"Ravenous"	4:06
5.	"Blood on Your Hands" (live)	5:27
6.	"My Apocalypse"	5:26
7.	"Dead Eyes See No Future"	4:14
8.	"Burning Angel"	4:17
9.	"I Will Live Again"	3:32
10.	"Taking Back My Soul" (live)	5:16
Total length:		44:48

== Credits ==
=== Band members ===
- Angela Gossow – vocals
- Michael Amott – guitar and backing vocals
- Christopher Amott – guitar
- Sharlee D'Angelo – bass
- Daniel Erlandsson – drums

=== Production ===
- Arch Enemy – production
- Andy Sneap – production (tracks #2 and #7), mixing and mastering (tracks #1 and #6)
- Fredrik Nordström – production (tracks #3, #4, #8, and #9)
- Rickard Bengtsson – production (tracks #1 and #6)
