= Arch Enemy discography =

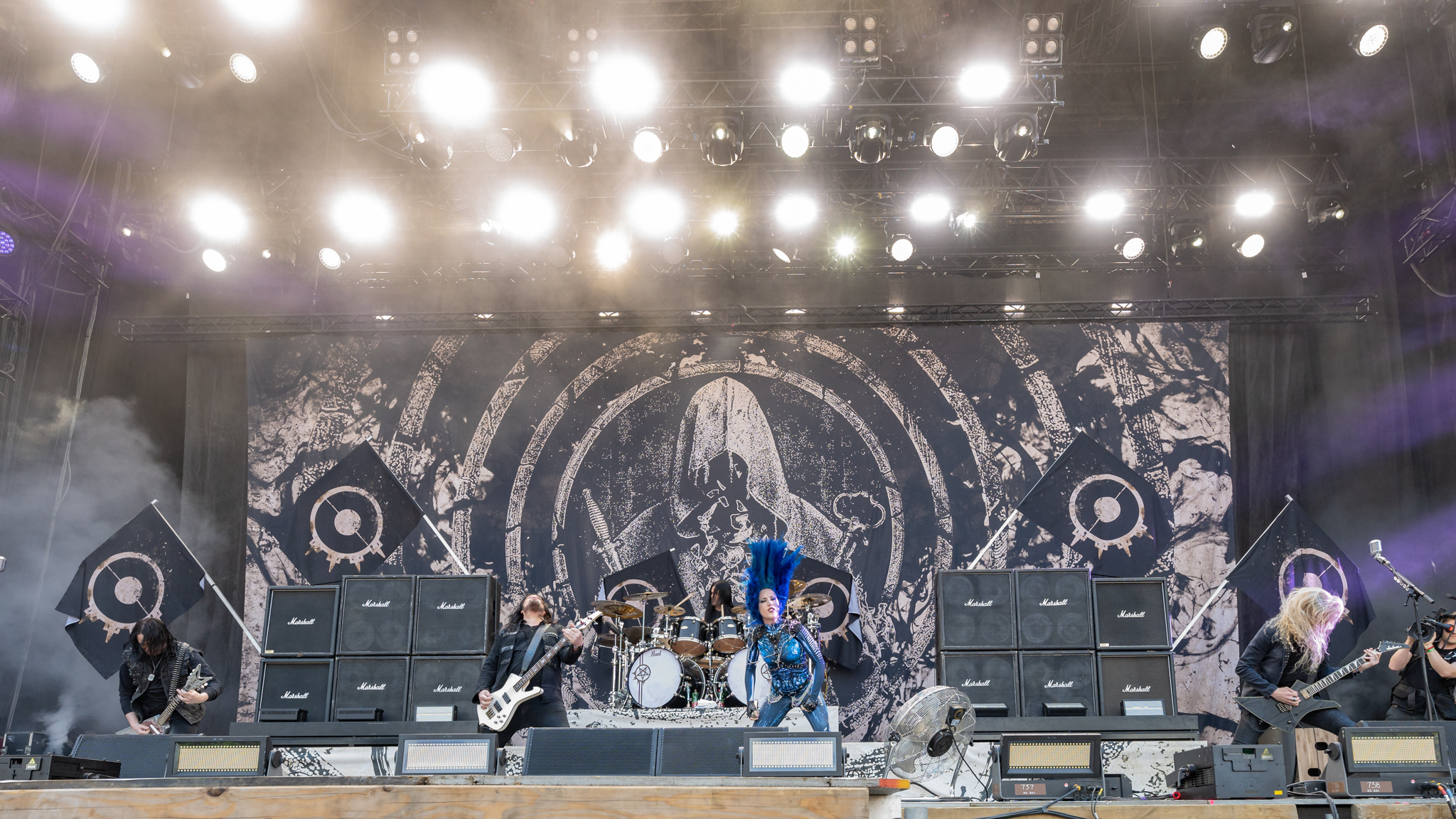
- Arch Enemy performing in 2023
- Studio albums: 13
- Extended plays: 5
- Live albums: 3
- Compilation albums: 2
- Singles: 42
- Video albums: 4
- Music videos: 39

The following is a comprehensive discography of Arch Enemy, a Swedish melodic death metal band that formed in 1996. Its members were in bands such as Carcass, Armageddon, Carnage, Mercyful Fate, Spiritual Beggars, and Eucharist. It was founded by Carcass guitarist Michael Amott along with Johan Liiva, who were both originally from the influential death metal band Carnage. The band has released thirteen studio albums, three live albums, three video albums, two compilation albums and five EPs. The band was originally fronted by Johan Liiva, who was replaced by German Angela Gossow as lead vocalist in 2000. Gossow left the band in March 2014 and was replaced by Canadian Alissa White-Gluz, while remaining as the group's manager. The band parted ways with White-Gluz in November 2025 and introduced Lauren Hart as the new vocalist in February 2026.

== Albums ==
=== Studio albums ===
| Title | Album details | Peak chart positions | | | | | | | | | | | Sales |
| Title | Album details | SWE | AUT | BEL | FIN | FRA | GER | JPN | SWI | NED | UK | US | Sales |
|---|---|---|---|---|---|---|---|---|---|---|---|---|---|
| Black Earth | Released: 2 October 1996; Label: Wrong Again; Formats: CD, LP, CS, DL | — | — | — | — | — | — | — | — | — | — | — | |
| Stigmata | Released: 5 May 1998; Label: Century Media; Formats: CD, LP, CS, DL | — | — | — | — | — | — | 94 | — | — | — | — | |
| Burning Bridges | Released: 21 May 1999; Label: Century Media; Formats: CD, LP, CS, DL | — | — | — | — | — | — | 22 | — | — | — | — | |
| Wages of Sin | Released: 25 April 2001; Label: Century Media; Formats: CD, CS | — | — | — | — | — | — | 25 | — | — | — | — | US: 40,000+ |
| Anthems of Rebellion | Released: 23 July 2003; Label: Century Media; Formats: CD, CD+DVD, LP, CS, DL | 60 | — | — | — | 83 | 69 | 22 | — | 97 | — | — | US: 40,000+ |
| Doomsday Machine | Released: 26 July 2005; Label: Century Media; Formats: CD, CD+DVD, LP, DL | 23 | 74 | — | — | — | 34 | 28 | — | — | 81 | 87 | US: 12,000+ |
| Rise of the Tyrant | Released: 24 September 2007; Label: Century Media; Formats: CD, CD+DVD, LP, DL | 20 | 50 | — | 18 | 72 | 28 | 14 | 65 | 83 | 105 | 84 | US: 8,900+ |
| The Root of All Evil | Released: 28 September 2009; Label: Century Media; Format: CD, LP | — | — | — | — | 133 | 84 | 21 | — | — | — | — | US: 1,500+ |
| Khaos Legions | Released: 30 May 2011; Label: Century Media; Formats: CD | 25 | 37 | 70 | 9 | 77 | 15 | 11 | 41 | 75 | 107 | 78 | US: 9,060+ |
| War Eternal | Released: 4 June 2014; Label: Century Media; Formats: CD, LP, CS, DL | 40 | 13 | 39 | 5 | 56 | 9 | 17 | 16 | 36 | 85 | 44 | US: 12,425+ |
| Will to Power | Released: 8 September 2017; Label: Century Media; Formats: CD, LP, DL | 11 | 6 | 11 | 2 | 33 | 3 | 15 | 5 | 11 | 37 | 90 | |
| Deceivers | Released: 12 August 2022; Label: Century Media; Formats: CD, LP, DL | 9 | 2 | 7 | 1 | 14 | 2 | 17 | 1 | 5 | 80 | — | |
| Blood Dynasty | Released: 28 March 2025; Label: Century Media; Formats: CD, LP, DL | 6 | 1 | 30 | 11 | — | 3 | 21 | 5 | 38 | — | — | JPN: 3,559 |

=== Live albums ===
| Title | Album details | Peak chart positions | | | | | | |
| Title | Album details | AUT | BEL | FIN | FRA | GER | JPN | SWI |
|---|---|---|---|---|---|---|---|---|
| Burning Japan Live 1999 | Released: 5 December 2000; Label: Import; Formats: CD, CS | — | — | — | — | — | 57 | — |
| Tyrants of the Rising Sun: Live in Japan | Released: 26 November 2008; Label: Import; Formats: CD, CD+DVD, LP | — | — | — | — | — | 122 | — |
| As the Stages Burn! | Released: 31 March 2017; Label: Century Media; Formats: CD, CD+DVD, CD+BD | 36 | 61 | 48 | 129 | 9 | 72 | 45 |

=== Compilation albums ===
| Title | Album details | Peak chart positions | | | | | | | Sales |
| Title | Album details | AUT | BEL | FIN | FRA | GER | JPN | SWI | Sales |
|---|---|---|---|---|---|---|---|---|---|
| Manifesto of Arch Enemy | Released: 27 February 2009; Label: Century Media; Format: CD | — | — | — | — | — | 14 | — | |
| Covered in Blood | Released: 18 January 2019; Label: Century Media; Formats: CD, LP, DL | 30 | 132 | 43 | 185 | 12 | — | 15 | |

== Extended plays ==
| Title | EP details | Peak chart positions |
| Title | EP details | JPN |
|---|---|---|
| Burning Angel | Released: 6 March 2002; Label: Century Media; Formats: CD | — |
| Dead Eyes See No Future | Released: 2 November 2004; Label: Century Media; Formats: CD, LP | 97 |
| Revolution Begins | Released: 31 August 2007; Label: Century Media; Formats: CD | — |
| Stolen Life | Released: 15 February 2015; Label: Trooper Entertainment; Formats: CD | — |
| Råpunk | Released: 8 September 2017; Label: Century Media; Formats: CD, LP, CS | 105 |

== Singles ==
| Title | Year | Album |
|---|---|---|
| "Bury Me an Angel" | 1996 | Black Earth |
| "The Immortal" | 1999 | Burning Bridges |
| "Ravenous" | 2001 | Wages of Sin |
| "Burning Angel" | 2002 | Wages of Sin |
| "We Will Rise" | 2003 | Anthems of Rebellion |
| "Dead Eyes See No Future" | 2004 | Anthems of Rebellion |
| "Nemesis" | 2005 | Doomsday Machine |
| "My Apocalypse" | 2005 | Doomsday Machine |
| "Taking Back My Soul" | 2005 | Doomsday Machine |
| "Blood on Your Hands" | 2007 | Rise of the Tyrant |
| "Revolution Begins" | 2007 | Rise of the Tyrant |
| "I Will Live Again" | 2008 | Rise of the Tyrant |
| "The Beast of Man" | 2009 | The Root of All Evil |
| "Dark Insanity" | 2009 | The Root of All Evil |
| "Yesterday Is Dead and Gone" | 2011 | Khaos Legions |
| "Bloodstained Cross" | 2011 | Khaos Legions |
| "Under Black Flags We March" | 2012 | Khaos Legions |
| "Cruelty Without Beauty" | 2012 | Khaos Legions |
| "War Eternal" | 2014 | War Eternal |
| "As the Pages Burn" | 2014 | War Eternal |
| "You Will Know My Name" | 2014 | War Eternal |
| "No More Regrets" | 2014 | War Eternal |
| "Stolen Life" | 2015 | War Eternal |
| "The World Is Yours" | 2017 | Will to Power |
| "The Eagle Flies Alone" | 2017 | Will to Power |
| "The Race" | 2017 | Will to Power |
| "Reason to Believe" | 2018 | Will to Power |
| "My Shadow and I" | 2022 | Will to Power |
| "Deceiver, Deceiver" | 2021 | Deceivers |
| "House of Mirrors" | 2021 | Deceivers |
| "Handshake with Hell" | 2022 | Deceivers |
| "Sunset over the Empire" | 2022 | Deceivers |
| "In the Eye of the Storm" | 2022 | Deceivers |
| "The Watcher" | 2022 | Deceivers |
| "Poisoned Arrow" | 2023 | Deceivers |
| "Dream Stealer" | 2024 | Blood Dynasty |
| "Liars & Thieves" | 2024 | Blood Dynasty |
| "Blood Dynasty" | 2024 | Blood Dynasty |
| "Paper Tiger" | 2025 | Blood Dynasty |
| "A Million Suns" | 2025 | Blood Dynasty |
| "Illuminate the Path" | 2025 | Blood Dynasty |
| "Break the Spell" | 2025 | Blood Dynasty |
| "March of the Miscreants" | 2025 | Blood Dynasty |
| "To the Last Breath" | 2026 | Non-album single |

== Videos ==
=== Video albums ===
| Title | Album details | Peak chart positions | Sales |
| Title | Album details | JPN | Sales |
|---|---|---|---|
| Live Apocalypse | Released: 24 July 2006; Label: Century Media; Formats: DVD | 61 | US: 1,200 |
| Tyrants of the Rising Sun: Live in Japan | Released: 2008; Label: Century Media; Formats: CD+DVD | 37 | |
| War Eternal Tour: Tokyo Sacrifice | Released: 2016; Label: Trooper Entertainment; Formats: DVD, BD | 15 | |

=== Music videos ===
| Year | Title | Album | Director |
|---|---|---|---|
| 1996 | "Bury Me an Angel" | Black Earth | —N/a |
| 1999 | "The Immortal" | Burning Bridges | Dick Bewarp |
| 2002 | "Ravenous" | Wages of Sin | M. Eriksson |
| 2003 | "We Will Rise" | Anthems of Rebellion | George Bravo |
| 2003 | "Dead Eyes See No Future" | Anthems of Rebellion | Mike Amott |
| 2005 | "Nemesis" | Doomsday Machine | George Bravo |
| 2005 | "My Apocalypse" | Doomsday Machine | Roger Johansson |
| 2007 | "Revolution Begins" | Rise of the Tyrant | Patric Ullaeus |
| 2008 | "I Will Live Again" | Rise of the Tyrant | Patric Ullaeus |
| 2008 | "Blood on Your Hands" | Rise of the Tyrant | Paul B. Smith |
| 2009 | "Beast of Man" | The Root of All Evil | —N/a |
| 2009 | "Dark Insanity" | The Root of All Evil | Paul B. Smith |
| 2011 | "Yesterday Is Dead and Gone" | Khaos Legions | Patric Ullaeus |
| 2011 | "Bloodstained Cross" | Khaos Legions | Clem Bennett |
| 2012 | "Under Black Flags We March" | Khaos Legions | Patric Ullaeus |
| 2012 | "Cruelty Without Beauty" | Khaos Legions | —N/a |
| 2014 | "War Eternal" | War Eternal | Patric Ullaeus |
| 2014 | "You Will Know My Name" | War Eternal | Patric Ullaeus |
| 2014 | "No More Regrets" | War Eternal | Patric Ullaeus |
| 2014 | "As the Pages Burn" | War Eternal | Carlos Toro V |
| 2015 | "Stolen Life" | War Eternal | Carlos Toro V (both versions) |
| 2016 | "Stolen Life" | War Eternal | Carlos Toro V (both versions) |
| 2017 | "Time Is Black" | War Eternal | Alex Boya |
| 2017 | "The World Is Yours" | Will to Power | Patric Ullaeus |
| 2017 | "The Eagle Flies Alone" | Will to Power | Patric Ullaeus |
| 2017 | "The Race" | Will to Power | Patric Ullaeus |
| 2018 | "Reason to Believe" | Will to Power | Patric Ullaeus |
| 2021 | "Deceiver, Deceiver" | Deceivers | Patric Ullaeus |
| 2021 | "House of Mirrors" | Deceivers | Grupa13 |
| 2022 | "Handshake with Hell" | Deceivers | Patric Ullaeus |
| 2022 | "Sunset Over the Empire" | Deceivers | Grupa13 |
| 2022 | "In the Eye of the Storm" | Deceivers | Mirko Witzki |
| 2022 | "The Watcher" | Deceivers | Jens De Vos |
| 2023 | "Poisoned Arrow" | Deceivers | Mirko Witzki |
| 2023 | "Handshake with Hell (Summer 2023 Recap)" | Deceivers | Jens De Vos |
| 2024 | "Dream Stealer" | Blood Dynasty | Patric Ullaeus |
| 2024 | "Liars & Thieves" | Blood Dynasty | Jens De Vos |
| 2024 | "Blood Dynasty" | Blood Dynasty | Mirko Witzki |
| 2025 | "Paper Tiger" | Blood Dynasty | Mumpi |
| 2025 | "A Million Suns" | Blood Dynasty | Mirko Witzki |
| 2025 | "Illuminate the Path" | Blood Dynasty | Patric Ullaeus |
| 2025 | "Break the Spell" | Blood Dynasty | David Provan |
| 2025 | "March of the Miscreants" | Blood Dynasty | David Provan |
| 2026 | "To The Last Breath" | | Patric Ullaeus |

=== Visualisers ===
All visualisers created by Wayne Joyner and Dave Letelier.

| Year | Title | Album |
|---|---|---|
| 2023 | "Dark Insanity" | Black Earth |
| 2023 | "Bridge of Destiny" | Stigmata |
| 2023 | "Silverwing" | Burning Bridges |
| 2023 | "Burning Angel" | Wages of Sin |
| 2023 | "Leader of the Rats" | Anthems of Rebellion |
