= Covered in Blood =

Compilation album by Arch Enemy
- Released: 18 January 2019
- Genre: Melodic death metal
- Length: 70:39
- Label: Century Media

Arch Enemy chronology
Will to Power (2017)	Covered in Blood (2019)	Deceivers (2022)

Covered in Blood is a compilation album by Arch Enemy, featuring all 24 covers the band recorded and released from 1996 until 2019. This is the only official Arch Enemy release that features all of the band's first three lead vocalists – Johan Liiva, Angela Gossow and Alissa White-Gluz.

== Background ==
Starting with their debut album (1996's Black Earth), Arch Enemy have regularly recorded two or more covers as bonus tracks for deluxe versions of their albums. Most of these tracks were exclusive to physical copies of the albums, and Covered in Blood is the first time they are available on streaming platforms. The album features all covers the band had, at that point, recorded in their entire career.

Tracks 1, 2 and 11 were originally bonus tracks of Will to Power.

Track 3 was originally a bonus track in the artbook deluxe version of War Eternal, and part of the EP Stolen Life.

Track 4 was originally a Japanese bonus track of War Eternal.

Tracks 5 and 6 were originally released on a flexi-disc available as a free gift with the August 2014 copy of Decibel magazine and, later, on the Råpunk EP which was available as a 7" vinyl in the deluxe boxset of Will to Power, and part of the EP Stolen Life..

Tracks 7, 8, 9 and 10 were originally on the Råpunk EP in the boxset of Will to Power and, later, as a 7" vinyl or CD single exclusively in Japan.

Tracks 12 and 16 were originally on the Kovered in Khaos EP as part of the deluxe digibook version of Khaos Legions.

Track 13 was originally a Japanese bonus track of Khaos Legions.

Track 14 was originally a Japanese bonus track of The Root of All Evil and, later, appeared on the Kovered in Khaos EP in the deluxe version of Khaos Legions.

Track 15 was originally a Japanese bonus track of Rise of the Tyrant and, later, appeared on the Kovered in Khaos EP in the deluxe version of Khaos Legions and on the Dawn of Khaos CD compilation which was available as a free gift with the May 2011 edition of Metal Hammer magazine and with the July/August 2011 issue of Close-Up Magazine.

Track 17 was originally a Japanese bonus track of The Root of All Evil.

Tracks 18, 19 and 20 were originally part of the EP Dead Eyes See No Future.

Tracks 21 and 24 were originally bonus tracks of Black Earth.

Track 22 was originally a bonus track of Burning Bridges and Wages of Sin.

Track 23 was originally a bonus track of Burning Bridges and Wages of Sin, and part of the EP Burning Angel.

This album remained a comprehensive compilation of every Arch Enemy cover until the release of Deceivers in 2022, which had two covers as bonus tracks - which, to this date, remain exclusive to physical copies of the album.

== Track listing ==
Covered in Blood track listing
No.	Title	Writer(s)	Length
1.	"Shout" (Tears for Fears)	Roland Orzabal, Ian Stanley	4:45
2.	"Back to Back" (Pretty Maids)	Ronnie Atkins, Ken Hammer, Alan Owen	3:21
3.	"Shadow on the Wall" (Mike Oldfield)	Mike Oldfield	3:03
4.	"Breaking the Law" (Judas Priest)	Rob Halford, KK Downing, Glenn Tipton	2:20
5.	"Nitad" (Moderat Likvidation)	Moderat Likvidation	1:06
6.	"When the Innocent Die" (Anti Cimex)	Anti Cimex	1:57
7.	"Warsystem" (Shitlickers)	Shitlickers	0:54
8.	"Armed Revolution" (Shitlickers)	Shitlickers	0:51
9.	"Spräckta Snutskallar" (Shitlickers)	Shitlickers	0:51
10.	"The Leader (of the Fuckin' Assholes)" (Shitlickers)	Shitlickers	1:02
11.	"City Baby Attacked by Rats" (Charged GBH)	Charged GBH	2:48
12.	"Warning" (Discharge)	Discharge	2:44
13.	"The Zoo" (Scorpions)	Rudolf Schenker, Klaus Meine	4:42
14.	"Wings of Tomorrow" (Europe)	Joey Tempest	3:15
15.	"The Oath" (Kiss)	Paul Stanley, Bob Ezrin, Tony Powers	4:14
16.	"The Book of Heavy Metal" (Dream Evil)	Snowy Shaw	4:16
17.	"Walk in the Shadows" (Queensrÿche)	Chris DeGarmo, Geoff Tate, Michael Wilton	3:06
18.	"Incarnated Solvent Abuse" (Carcass)	Bill Steer, Michael Amott	4:35
19.	"Kill with Power" (Manowar)	Joey DeMaio	3:30
20.	"Symphony of Destruction" (Megadeth)	Dave Mustaine	4:02
21.	"Aces High" (Iron Maiden)	Steve Harris	4:24
22.	"Scream of Anger" (Europe)	Tempest, Marcel Jacob	3:46
23.	"Starbreaker" (Judas Priest)	Halford, Downing, Tipton	3:23
24.	"The Ides of March" (Iron Maiden)	Harris	1:44
Total length:			70:39

== Personnel ==
Arch Enemy

- Michael Amott – lead & rhythm guitars (all tracks), bass (tracks 21, 24), liner notes
- Daniel Erlandsson – drums (all tracks)
- Sharlee D'Angelo – bass (tracks 1–20, 22, 23)
- Alissa White-Gluz – vocals (tracks 1–11)
- Angela Gossow – vocals (tracks 12–20)
- Johan Liiva – vocals (tracks 21–23)
- Jeff Loomis – lead guitar (tracks 1–2, 7–11)
- Nick Cordle – lead guitar (tracks 3–6)
- Christopher Amott – lead guitar (tracks 12–24)

Additional personnel

- Fredrik Nordström – production, engineering, mixing, keyboards
- Costin Chioreanu – cover art, layout

== Charts ==
Chart performance for Covered in Bloom
Chart (2019)	Peak position
Austrian Albums (Ö3 Austria)	30
Belgian Albums (Ultratop Flanders)	132
Belgian Albums (Ultratop Wallonia)	58
French Albums (SNEP)	185
German Albums (Offizielle Top 100)	12
Swiss Albums (Schweizer Hitparade)	15
