= Doomsday Machine (album) =

- Cover art by Joachim Luetke

Studio album by Arch Enemy
- Released: 26 July 2005
- Recorded: March–May 2005
- Studios: Slaughterhouse Studio, Halmstad, Sweden
- Genre: Melodic death metal
- Length: 49:05
- Label: Century Media
- Producer: Rickard Bengtsson

Arch Enemy chronology
Dead Eyes See No Future (2004)	Doomsday Machine (2005)	Rise of the Tyrant (2007)

Singles from Doomsday Machine
- 1. "Nemesis" Released: 2005; 2. "My Apocalypse" Released: 2005; 3. "Taking Back My Soul" Released: 2005

Professional ratings
Review scores
Source	Rating
AllMusic	3/5 stars
Blabbermouth.net	7.0/10
Collector's Guide to Heavy Metal	6/10
PopMatters	7/10
Rock Hard	8.5/10

Doomsday Machine is the sixth studio album by Swedish melodic death metal band Arch Enemy, produced by Rickard Bengtsson and mixed by Andy Sneap. It is the third album to feature the vocals of Angela Gossow. The album had some commercial success, debuting at number 87 on the Billboard 200 with first week sales of 12,000 copies. It had sold 65,000 copies in the United States by April 2006. Christopher Amott left the band shortly after recording the album in July 2005 but rejoined 2 years later for the songwriting sessions for Rise of the Tyrant.

== Reception ==
Doomsday Machine received mixed reviews by critics. Adrien Begrand of PopMatters praised the songs highlighting "Enter the Machine", "Nemesis" and "My Apocalypse". He said that Michael and Christopher Amott "truly shine on the album" and that Arch Enemy "marry the brutal with the melodic" with "impressive skill". Tom Day of musicOMH, that also praised "Enter the Machine" calling it of "a prime example of metal at its very, very best... This instrumental is simply breathtaking", said that Arch Enemy "set themselves apart from so many mediocre death metal acts by never letting their songs stagnate." Pal Meentzen of Maelstrom said that Doomsday Machine "gives a worthy example of the best in current day (Swedish) melo-death. It is a slightly better album than Wages of Sin and much better than Anthems of Rebellion" and called "My Apocalypse" of "perfect example of a band that has found the right consistency in its line-up." However, he criticized the fade out of "Slaves of Yesterday". Evil Rocker of Metal Rules noted that "perhaps the most impressive aspect of this album is the heavy use of dual guitars and solo's [sic], not something usually in the forefront of this genre." Jackie Smit of Chronicles of Chaos felt that the album presents significant improvements over the previous album Anthems of Rebellion and commented that it "as a whole is likely to disappoint only the most selective listener." Eduardo Rivadavia of Allmusic said that Doomsday Machine is "fundamentally, yet another immaculately produced Arch Enemy album, forged first and foremost by the vision of Michael Amott's guitar." Ciaran Meeks of Metal Eater commented that the band "have harked back to their roots on this album, reworking and revitalizing the musical philosophy of albums such as Stigmata and Burning Bridges into a new-millennial context that will doubtless bludgeon both old and new listeners alike into drop-jawed submission."

Jason Jordan of Metal Review wrote a negative review where he states that the band "haven't crafted anything purchase-worthy since Johan Liiva was fronting the crew." Jordan also comments that "while Doomsday Machine isn't utterly devoid of arresting ingredients, you probably won't glean as much satisfaction from this as you will from Black Earth or Burning Bridges." MetalGeorge of Metal Rules also criticized the album saying that it "severs all ties between the band and [its] old fan base by catering even more to the plague that is the New Wave of American Heavy Metal" and that "where as albums such as Burning Bridges and Wages of Sin lead the heavy metal charge, Doomsday Machine seems content to merely follow in the trodden footsteps of today's trends and common sounds." Greg Pratt of Exclaim! wrote that the album is "basically more of the same but they've managed to revitalise their sound a bit, adding in some toe-tapping maturity, along with the usual balls-out shredding." Cosmo Lee of Stylus Magazine concluded that "minus that instrumental, and with more focused songwriting, this album could have been killer. Instead, it is a collection of riffs strung together, with some hot guitar playing." Keith Bergman of Blabbermouth.net said that "overall, the album leaves a pretty good impression, though it seems to be lacking a certain spark that made earlier efforts essential listening." Not unlike him, Justin Donnelly of Blistering felt that the album "lies somewhere in between both damnation and acclaim, without being one of the other." He commented that the record is not terrible, but "an inconsistent and unfocussed effort" and that Doomsday Machine "overall is stronger than Anthems of Rebellion, but it is hardly a huge leap forward in terms of consistency." The song I Am Legend/Out For Blood is featured in the comedy movie Let's Be Cops.

=== Accolades ===
Doomsday Machine received one nomination at the 2005 Metal Storm Awards in the category of The Best Melodeath/Gothenburg Album. It was ranked in the second position behind Character by Dark Tranquillity.

In 2005, the album was ranked number 470 in Rock Hard magazine's book of The 500 Greatest Rock & Metal Albums of All Time.

== Track listing ==
All music is composed by Michael Amott, Daniel Erlandsson and Christopher Amott.

No.	Title	Lyrics	Length
1.	"Enter the Machine" (Instrumental)		2:02
2.	"Taking Back My Soul"	Angela Gossow, M. Amott	4:35
3.	"Nemesis"	Gossow	4:12
4.	"My Apocalypse"	Gossow	5:25
5.	"Carry the Cross"	Gossow	4:12
6.	"I Am Legend/Out for Blood"	Gossow	4:58
7.	"Skeleton Dance"	Gossow	4:33
8.	"Hybrids of Steel" (Instrumental)		3:49
9.	"Mechanic God Creation"	Gossow, M. Amott	6:00
10.	"Machtkampf" ("Power Struggle")	M. Amott	4:16
11.	"Slaves of Yesterday"	Gossow	5:03
Total length:			49:05

Japanese and Korean editions
No.	Title	Lyrics	Music	Length
12.	"Heart of Darkness" (live in Paris in 2004)	M. Amott	C. Amott, M. Amott	4:51
13.	"Bridge of Destiny" (live in Paris in 2004)	M. Amott	C. Amott, M. Amott	8:04
Total length:				1:02:00

== Singles ==
1. "Nemesis"
2. "My Apocalypse"
3. "Taking Back My Soul"

== Personnel ==
Personnel credits adapted from Doomsday Machine album liner notes.

=== Arch Enemy ===
- Angela Gossow − vocals
- Michael Amott − guitars, artwork concept
- Christopher Amott − guitars
- Sharlee D'Angelo − bass
- Daniel Erlandsson − drums

=== Production ===
- Rickard Bengtsson − producer, additional arrangements
- Andy Sneap − mixing, mastering
- Ola Strömberg – assistant engineer, keyboards
- Gus G − 2nd guitar solo on "Taking Back My Soul"
- Apollo Papathanasio − backing vocals
- Joachim Luetke − artwork, artwork concept, layout
- Paul Harries − band picture

== Release history ==
Region	Date	Label	Format
United States	26 July 2005	Century Media Records	CD
United Kingdom	22 August 2005	Century Media	CD

== Charts ==
=== Album ===
Chart (2005)	Peak Position
Billboard 200	87
Billboard Top Independent Albums	12
Swedish Album Chart	23
Austrian Album Chart	74
