= Burning Japan Live 1999 =

Live album by Arch Enemy
- Released: 5 May 2000
- Recorded: October–November 1999 in Tokyo
- Genre: Melodic death metal
- Length: 48:47
- Label: Toy's Factory
- Producer: Fredrik Nordström, Michael Amott

Arch Enemy chronology
Burning Bridges (1999)	Burning Japan Live 1999 (2000)	Wages of Sin (2001)

Burning Japan Live 1999 is a live album by Swedish melodic death metal band Arch Enemy. Originally released in Japan only, the album was re-released worldwide in 2000 due to fan demand.

== Reception ==
Burning Japan Live 1999 received mixed reviews by critics. Metal Rules's El Cid criticized mainly the crowd writing that "the Japanese crowd doesn't help much in this matter, no offense to anyone but it does seem like everyone is just sitting down listening and doing nothing else during a gig unless they are instructed to by Johan Liiva" and stated that the album "is very much like listening to a compilation of Arch Enemy songs rather than a live album." On the other hand, Paul Schwarz of Chronicles of Chaos wrote in his review that it "has a clear yet characteristic sound which places it in the rare category of being a live album well worth owning. The musical elements have a live-sounding rawness while retaining the subtleties which are such essential parts of Arch Enemy's masterful mixture of pure riff and metal melodies". He praised Liiva writing that his "vocal delivery is both powerful and expressive - and similarly well-balanced and accentuated by the top-notch production." Schwarz finished writing about the crowd, "the crowd are enthusiastically loud though their fanatical support is thankfully quite unintrusive to the enjoyment of the record."

== Track listing ==
No.	Title	Lyrics	Music	Length
1.	"The Immortal" (from Burning Bridges)	Johan Liiva, Michael Amott	Christopher Amott, M. Amott	3:48
2.	"Dark Insanity" (from Black Earth)	Liiva	Liiva, M. Amott	3:44
3.	"Dead Inside" (from Burning Bridges)	M. Amott	C. Amott, M. Amott	4:16
4.	"Diva Satanica" (from Burning Bridges)	M. Amott	C. Amott, M. Amott	4:12
5.	"Pilgrim" (from Burning Bridges)	M. Amott	C. Amott, M. Amott	4:40
6.	"Silverwing" (from Burning Bridges)	M. Amott	C. Amott, M. Amott	4:14
7.	"Beast of Man" (Stigmata)	M. Amott	C. Amott, M. Amott	3:34
8.	"Bass Intro/Tears of the Dead" (from Stigmata)	M. Amott	Sharlee D'Angelo, M. Amott	6:11
9.	"Bridge of Destiny" (from Stigmata)	M. Amott	C. Amott, M. Amott	5:27
10.	"Transmigration Macabre" (from Black Earth)	M. Amott	M. Amott	4:13
11.	"Angelclaw" (from Burning Bridges)	M. Amott	C. Amott, M. Amott	4:28
Total length:				48:47

== Personnel ==
Personnel credits adapted from Burning Bridges album liner notes.

=== Arch Enemy ===
- Johan Liiva − vocals
- Michael Amott − guitars, producer
- Christopher Amott − guitars
- Sharlee D'Angelo − bass
- Daniel Erlandsson − drums

=== Production ===
- Fredrik Nordström − producer, mixing
- Steve Gurney − engineer, recording
- Göran Finnberg – mastering
