= Stigmata (Arch Enemy album) =

Studio album by Arch Enemy
- Released: 5 May 1998
- Recorded: October 1997, January 1998
- Studio: Studio Fredman
- Genre: Melodic death metal
- Length: 46:17
- Label: Century Media
- Producer: Fredrik Nordström, Michael Amott

Arch Enemy chronology
Black Earth (1996)	Stigmata (1998)	Burning Bridges (1999)

Alternative cover
- Deluxe edition cover

Stigmata is the second studio album by Swedish melodic death metal band Arch Enemy. The album was Arch Enemy's first to see worldwide release, in Europe and North America on Century Media Records, and in Japan again on Toy's Factory records. Stigmata features session drummer Peter Wildoer, who had also appeared in Christopher Amott's solo project Armageddon on the 1997 album Crossing the Rubicon, shortly before the recording of the album. The album was reissued on 25 May 2009, featuring a new layout, packaging, and bonus tracks. Stigmata not only contains a title track, but a track named after their previous album as well. The album was reissued again on 28 April 2023 in various formats, along with a visualiser for “Bridge of Destiny”.

== Reception ==
Professional ratings
Review scores
Source	Rating
AllMusic	3/5 stars
Chronicles of Chaos	8.5/10
Collector's Guide to Heavy Metal	9/10

Stigmata received mixed reviews by critics, who compared it with the previous Arch Enemy album, Black Earth. Jason Anderson of Allmusic noted that "as often happens with highly anticipated follow-ups, Stigmata disappointed some fans with what some called a more restrained sound and lesser material" and criticized the singer Johan Liiva and the addition of the session drummer Peter Wildoer. Nevertheless, Anderson praised Michael Amott stating that "these problems are really minor when balanced against Amott's massive playing and songwriting, so while Stigmata is a fraction off from the band's debut form, Arch Enemy still delivers some nice melodic death metal on the sophomore effort."

Paul Schwarz of Chronicles of Chaos first noted that "Arch Enemy have made an interesting, and slightly unexpected, progression from their Black Earth debut of two years ago". He commented that the band "have not drawn their 'melody' from pop or even folk" and what characterises the difference between both albums "can be summed up in three words: classic heavy metal." Schwarz finished with a good review writing that "overall Stigmata is a great album and one of the best directions Arch Enemy could have chosen to follow after their critical success with Black Earth."

Critics Paul Schwarz and EvilG mentioned that the sound resembles the Carcass album Heartwork. Schwarz compares it to Black Earth: "Opener "Beast of Man" kicks in with searing riffing and thundering double bass, which creates the false impression that the new material will be far more like the Heartwork era Carcass sound which characterised much of Black Earth. Arch Enemy have, in fact, gone the opposite way - in terms of heaviness, not quality -, and produced an album which utilises far more melody, especially in its choruses, than BE did." EvilG of Metal Rules praises writing that "I think the reason why this CD is so great is that it has re-captured the Carcass Heartwork sound and feel while at the same time incorporating more melody and even some power metal sounds."

== Track listing ==
All tracks are written by Michael Amott, except where noted.

No.	Title	Lyrics	Music	Length
1.	"Beast of Man"		M. Amott; Christopher Amott	3:36
2.	"Stigmata"	instrumental		2:11
3.	"Sinister Mephisto"			5:45
4.	"Dark of the Sun"		M. Amott; C. Amott	7:00
5.	"Let the Killing Begin"	Johan Liiva; M. Amott	M. Amott; C. Amott	5:18
6.	"Black Earth"	Liiva; M. Amott		6:39
7.	"Tears of the Dead"			5:55
8.	"Vox Stellarum"	instrumental	Fredrik Nordström	2:08
9.	"Bridge of Destiny"		M. Amott; C. Amott	7:45
Total length:				46:17

Deluxe edition
No.	Title	Lyrics	Music	Length
10.	"Hydra" (from Japanese edition)	instrumental	C. Amott; Nordström	0:57
11.	"Diva Satanica" (from Japanese edition)		M. Amott; C. Amott	3:44
12.	"Damnation's Way" (from Japanese edition)	Liiva; M. Amott	Liiva; M. Amott	3:50
13.	"Diva Satanica" (from Burning Japan Live 1999)		M. Amott; C. Amott	4:05
14.	"Beast of Man" (from Burning Japan Live 1999)		M. Amott; C. Amott	3:38
15.	"Bass Intro/Tears of the Dead" (from Burning Japan Live 1999)		Sharlee D'Angelo/M. Amott	6:05
16.	"Bridge of Destiny" (from Burning Japan Live 1999)		M. Amott; C. Amott	5:42
Total length:				1:14:18

Japanese edition track listing
No.	Title	Lyrics	Music	Length
1.	"Beast of Man"		M. Amott; C. Amott	3:36
2.	"Stigmata"	instrumental		2:11
3.	"Sinister Mephisto"			5:45
4.	"Dark of the Sun"		M. Amott; C. Amott	7:00
5.	"Let the Killing Begin"	Liiva; M. Amott	M. Amott; C. Amott	5:18
6.	"Black Earth"	Liiva; M. Amott		6:39
7.	"Hydra"	instrumental	C. Amott; Nordström	0:57
8.	"Tears of the Dead"			5:55
9.	"Diva Satanica"		M. Amott; C. Amott	3:44
10.	"Damnation's Way"	Liiva; M. Amott	Liiva; M. Amott	3:49
11.	"Vox Stellarum"	instrumental	Nordström	2:08
12.	"Bridge of Destiny"		M. Amott; C. Amott	7:45
Total length:				54:47

== Personnel ==
Personnel credits adapted from the album's liner notes.

Arch Enemy

- Johan Liiva − vocals
- Michael Amott − guitars, co-producer
- Christopher Amott − guitars
- Martin Bengtsson − bass
- Peter Wildoer − drums
- Daniel Erlandsson − drums ("Beast of Man", "Diva Satanica" and Burning Japan Live 1999)

Additional musicians

- Fredrik Nordström − keyboards, grand piano
- Sharlee D'Angelo – bass (Burning Japan Live 1999)

Production

- Fredrik Nordström – producer, engineer
- Göran Finnberg – mastering
- Segerfalk X – original artwork, design, masques design and photography
- Kristian Gunnemo – masques design and photography
- Carl Ljungberg – band photography
- Kris Verwimp – frontcover artwork
