= Crossing the Rubicon (Armageddon album) =

Studio album by Armageddon
- Released: May 1997
- Recorded: Studio Fredman
- Genre: Melodic death metal
- Length: 37:52
- Label: W.A.R. Records
- Producer: Fredrik Nordström

Armageddon chronology
Crossing the Rubicon (1997)	Embrace the Mystery (2000)

Crossing the Rubicon was an album by the Swedish melodic death metal band Armageddon, released in Europe on the now defunct Wrong Again Records, and in Japan on Toy's Factory records in 1997. The album features Christopher Amott of Arch Enemy, as well as former Arch Enemy members Peter Wildoer and Martin Bengtsson. The album was only released in Japan, briefly in Europe, and is extremely hard to find.

== Track listing ==
1. "2022" (Intro) – 1:59 (instrumental)
2. "Godforsaken" – 4:39
3. "The Juggernaut Divine" – 5:18
4. "Astral Adventure" – 4:59
5. "Funeral in Space" – 3:01 (instrumental)
6. "Asteroid Dominion" – 4:38
7. "Galaxies Away" – 3:49 (instrumental)
8. "Faithless" – 2:11
9. "Children of the New Sun" – 2:45 (instrumental)
10. "Into the Sun" – 4:33

== Personnel ==
=== Band members ===
- Jonas Nyrén – vocals
- Christopher Amott – guitars
- Martin Bengtsson – bass
- Peter Wildoer – drums, percussion

=== Guest/session musicians ===
- Michael Amott – vocals
- Fredrik Nordström – keyboards
- Rasmus Fleischer – recorder
- Jakob Törma – violin

=== Production ===
- Arranged by Armageddon
- Produced and mixed by Fredrik Nordström
- Recorded by Anders Fridén and Fredrik Nordström
- Mastered by Staffan Olofsson
