= Michael Amott =

Swedish guitarist (born 1969)

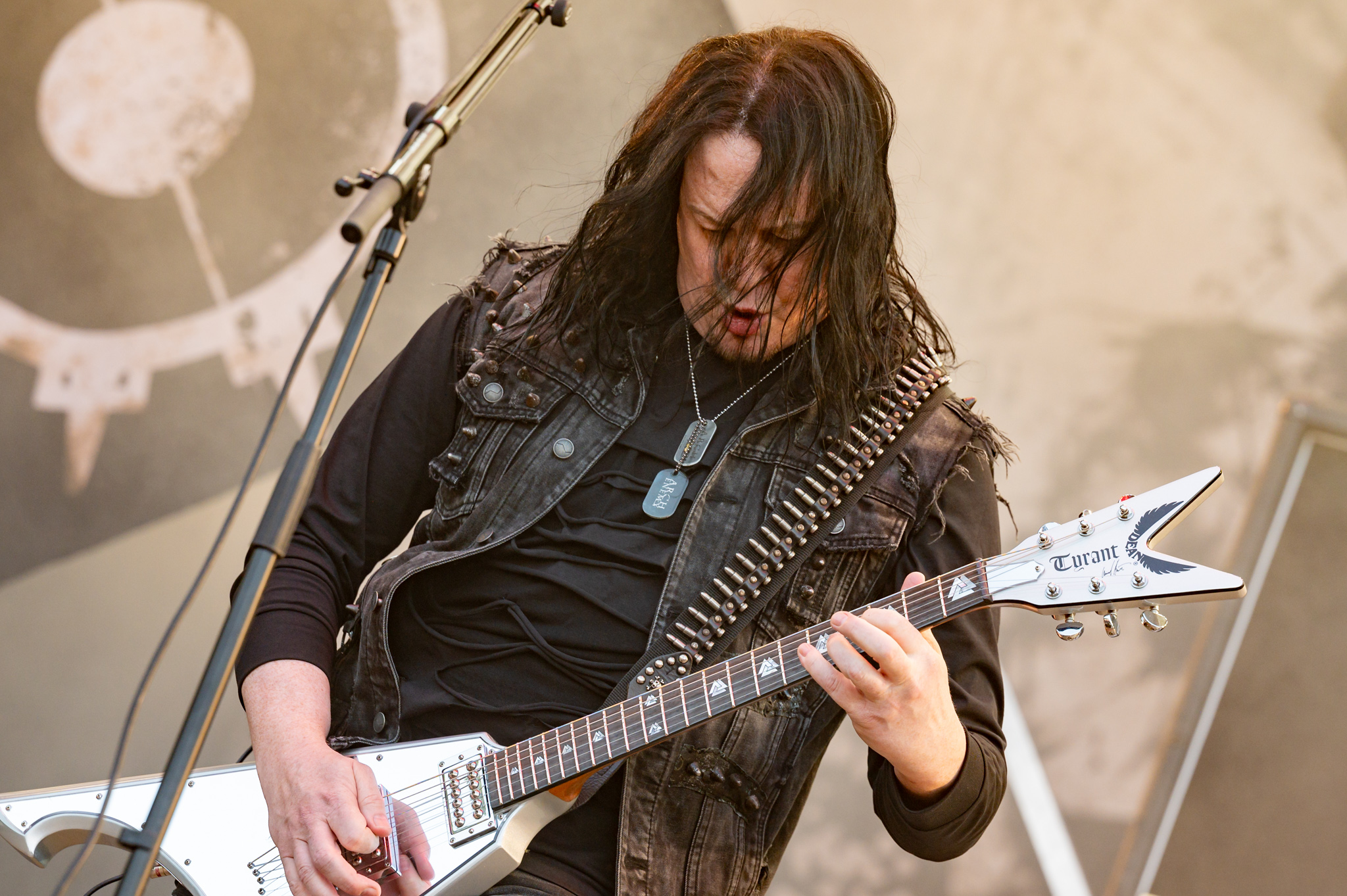
- Amott in 2023

Background information
- Born: 28 July 1969 (age 57); Halmstad, Sweden
- Genres: Melodic death metal; death metal; stoner metal; hard rock
- Occupation: Guitarist
- Years active: 1983–present
- Member of: Arch Enemy; Spiritual Beggars
- Formerly of: Carnage; Carcass
- Website: michaelamott.com

Michael Amott (born 28 July 1969) is a Swedish guitarist, founding member of the metal bands Arch Enemy, Spiritual Beggars and Carnage, as well as a former member of Carcass. He is the older brother of Christopher Amott.

Amott was ranked No. 74 out of 100 Greatest Heavy Metal Guitarists of All Time by Guitar World.

== Biography ==
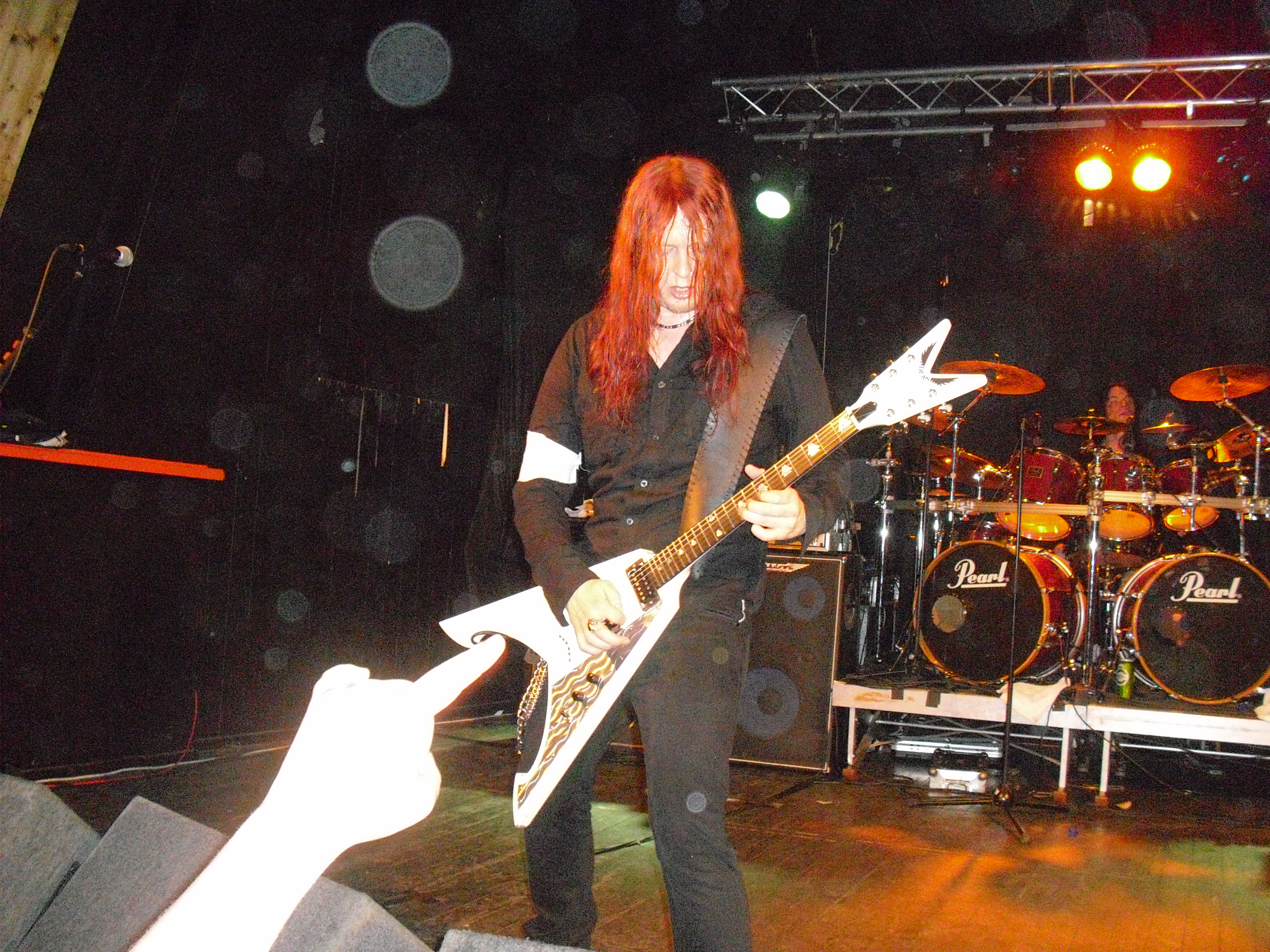
Amott performing with Arch Enemy in 2010

Amott was born in Halmstad, Sweden, to a British father and Swedish mother. Soon after his birth the family moved to England where Amott lived the first five years of his life, after which they moved back to Sweden.

Amott co-formed the death metal band Carnage in 1988 with singer Johan Liiva, and released two widely traded cassette demos, gaining instant underground interest. Plagued by constant lineup changes, Carnage eventually recorded their only album Dark Recollections with Amott as the sole original member, but by the time the album came out on Necrosis records in 1990, the band was broken up.

Soon afterwards, Amott was recruited by Carcass in 1990, and released the seminal album Necroticism – Descanting the Insalubrious in 1991. The band went on to release their highest selling album, Heartwork (Columbia/Sony), in 1993, helping to define what is now known as melodic death metal.

Amott left Carcass in 1993, and decided to form a classic rock influenced band, Spiritual Beggars. The band released their debut album Spiritual Beggars in 1994, which led to a European record deal with Music for Nations, who released Another Way to Shine in 1996.

Still heavily into extreme metal, Amott formed a new melodic death metal project in the same vein as Carcass, whose Heartwork album was now considered a death metal masterpiece. Amott contacted original Carnage vocalist Johan Liiva, as well as his younger brother Christopher Amott, who was attending music school at the time, and put together Arch Enemy. Featuring then session drummer Daniel Erlandsson, the band's first album Black Earth was originally intended to be a one-off project, but the album's first single, "Bury Me An Angel" received unexpected airplay on Japan's MTV Rocks! program, and in 1997 Arch Enemy was signed by major Japanese label Toy's Factory, and invited to tour Japan. Amott decided to put a full band together, recruiting drummer Peter Wildoer (Darkane), and bassist Martin Bengtsson.

After the Japanese tour, Amott returned to Spiritual Beggars and released Mantra III early in 1998, now featuring Per Wiberg on keyboards. In April the same year, Arch Enemy returned with Stigmata, their first album released outside Japan, now on Century Media records. The album would prove to be a critical success, and Arch Enemy toured for the better part of the year. Later the same year Amott also contributed guitars to the Candlemass album Dactylis Glomerata.

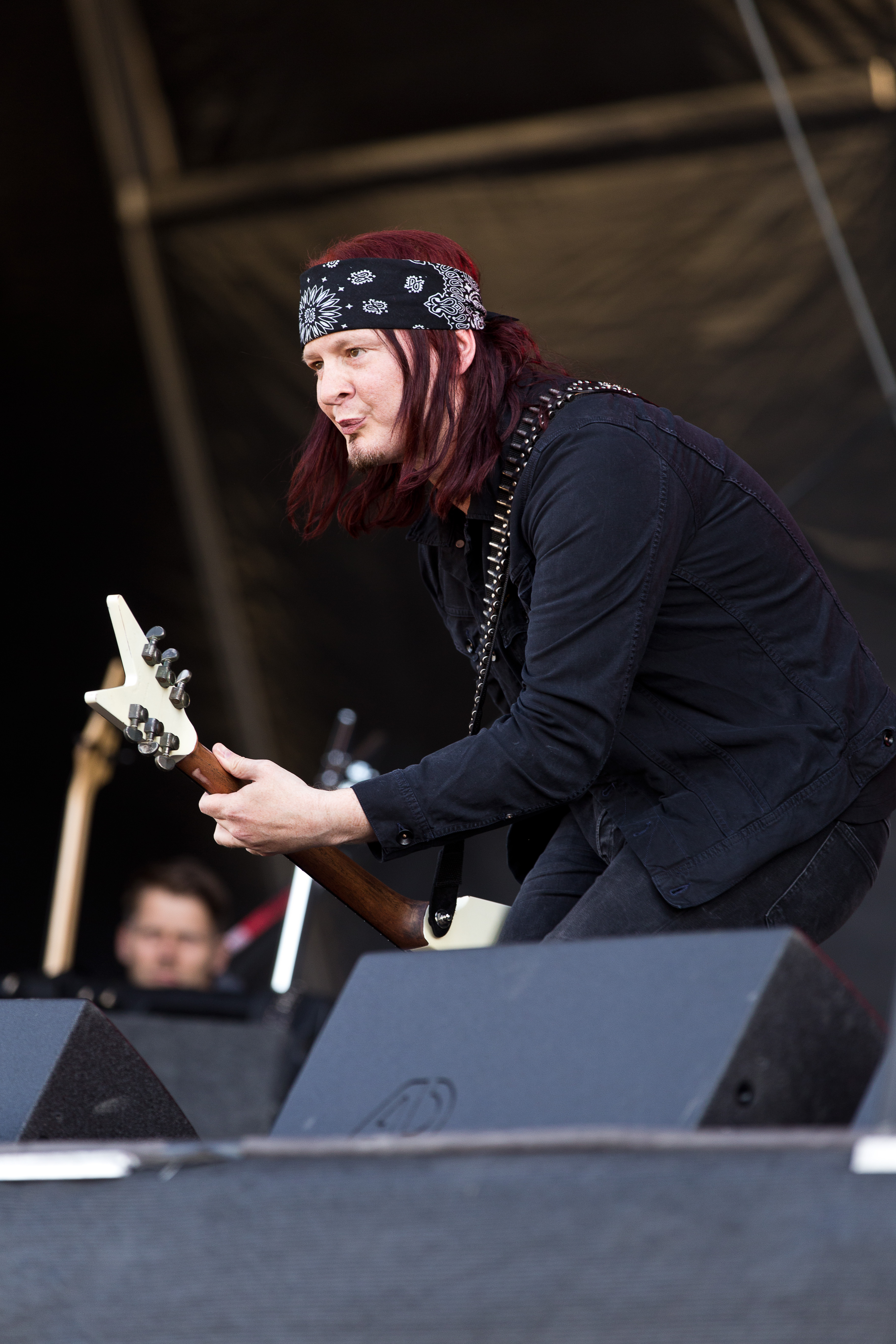
Amott with Spiritual Beggars at the Rockharz Open Air 2016 in Germany

Arch Enemy returned in 1999 with Burning Bridges and Burning Japan Live 1999 which would prove to be Johan Liiva's last recording with the band. Amott went on to release Ad Astra with Spiritual Beggars in 2000, then returned to Arch Enemy, and recruited amateur German vocalist Angela Gossow to replace Liiva in 2000. Arch Enemy released Wages of Sin in 2001, and propelled by the new frontwoman, the band achieved new worldwide success. Arch Enemy toured worldwide in support of Wages of Sin, and Amott did not return to his Spiritual Beggars project until late 2002, releasing On Fire, again on Music for Nations. In 2003, Arch Enemy released Anthems of Rebellion, again on Century Media, and for the first time, Arch Enemy received US MTV airplay with the video for "We Will Rise". The band would reach new heights in popularity worldwide, and toured constantly until the release of 2005s Doomsday Machine. Amott returned once again to Spiritual Beggars in 2005, releasing the album Demons.

He has also performed guest guitar solos on the following recordings:

- The Haunted – One Kill Wonder ("Bloodletting")
- Kreator – Enemy of God ("Murder Fantasies")
- Destruction – Thrash Anthems II ("The Ritual")

In 2006, Amott made his voice acting debut when he appeared on the Adult Swim show Metalocalypse. In the episode "Snakes 'n Barrels", he voiced scientist Dr. Amomolith Chesterfield and Snakes 'n Barrels bassist Antonio Tony DiMarco Thunderbottom, who would end up getting his memory erased during the first song of their reunion show. Amott returned for more voice acting in the second season of Metalocalypse in the episode "Snakes n' Barrels II" (Part 1 and 2).

In 2007, Arch Enemy released Rise of the Tyrant on Century Media and embarked on a world tour dubbed "World Tyranny".

In 2008, Amott joined the re-united Carcass and toured with them extensively in Europe, North America, South America, Australia, South Africa and Japan until the summer of 2010.

Today, Amott is busy touring the world with Arch Enemy, but has also sporadically returned to Spiritual Beggars for the "Return To Zero" (2010), "Earth Blues" (2013) and "Sunrise to Sundown" albums and tours.

== Personal life ==
Amott has been a vegetarian since the age of 14. He is a self-taught guitar player. He dated former band member Angela Gossow (at one point being engaged to marry her in 2003), but the two are no longer together after thirteen years and still remain friends and work partners.

== Guitar style and influences ==
Amott began playing guitar as a young teenager, learning to play by copying hardcore punk and heavy metal out of his record collection. His guitar style is characterized by extensive use of pentatonic-based phrasing and a pronounced, expressive application of the wah pedal. Amott's guitar style was influenced by lead guitarists such as Michael Schenker, Uli Jon Roth, Gary Moore and Frank Marino, and also by rhythm guitarists such as James Hetfield, Dave Mustaine, Jeff Hanneman and Kerry King. He has also cited Tony Iommi and Ritchie Blackmore as early inspirations, and noted that bands associated with the traditional heavy metal movement such as Judas Priest, Saxon, Motörhead and Accept, helped shape his overall musical direction.

== Equipment ==
=== Guitars ===
- Dean Wraith models (an ML style version of the Tyrant, since 2025)
- Dean Tyrant models (Current signature models since 2008)
- Dean Time Capsule V (Khaos Legion tour, Spiritual Beggars)
- Dean Michael Schenker Flame V
- ESP Ninja V models (Previous global signature models, 2004-2008)
- ESP AV-310MA Flying V models (Japanese market signature models, 2002-2004)
- ESP George Lynch Forest Baritone (seen in Arch Enemy Live Apocalypse DVD)
- ESP Vintage Plus (seen in the Spiritual Beggars "Killing Time" promotional video)
- Ibanez RG550 Road Flare Red (Used in Carcass, 1991–1993)
- Fernandes "Burny" Les Paul Custom (White, used 1996–1999, 'The Immortal' music video)
- Fernandes "Burny" Les Paul Custom Sustainer (Black, used 1996–1999)
- Gibson Flying V (Heartwork music video. Got lost in Israel)

The 'Tyrant' series is similar to his previous ESP Signature V's, but does feature some differences from them. The 'Tyrant' series features a customized V body shape, Dean's traditional headstock shape, custom graphics and custom pearl Valknut inlays. The 'Tyrant' series are equipped with Dean USA Pickups: a Michael Amott signature humbucker in the bridge and a Time Capsule humbucker in the neck. The guitar has 22 frets.

=== Amps ===
- Marshall JVM410H
- Marshall JCM800 2205 50w
- Marshall JCM2000 (Khaos Legions tour)
- Randall RM100 with Ultra XL modules (Rise of the Tyrant)
- Randall V2 Ninja (Rise Of The Tyrant tour, his short lived signature amp)
- Krank Revolution One (Doomsday Machine)
- Krank Krankenstein (Live Apocalypse DVD)
- Peavey XXX and JSX (Anthems Of Rebellion)
- Peavey 5150 (Heartwork - Wages Of Sin)

=== Effects ===
- Morley Michael Amott Signature Mini Wah
- Ibanez TS-808 Tube Screamer
- DigiTech GSP1101 (Multi effects processor)

=== Other ===
- Rotosound Strings (11–59 Michael Amott signature set)
- TC Electronic "Polytune 2" Tuner
- Line6 G90 Wireless Unit

=== Guitar Rig and Signal Flow ===
A detailed gear diagram of Michael Amott's 2006 Arch Enemy guitar rig is well-documented.

== Bands ==
- Disaccord (guitars, 1983–1984 and 1986–1988)
- Carnage (guitars, 1988–1990) (founding member)
- Carcass (guitars, 1990–1993; re-union shows in 2008–2010)
- Spiritual Beggars (guitars, 1994–) (founding member)
- Arch Enemy (guitars, 1996–) (founding member)
- Candlemass (guitars, 1997) (studio musician)

== Discography ==
=== Carnage ===
- Dark Recollections (1990)

=== Carcass ===
- Necroticism – Descanting the Insalubrious (1991)
- Tools of the Trade (1992, EP)
- Heartwork (1993)
- Wake Up and Smell the... Carcass (1996)

=== Spiritual Beggars ===
- Spiritual Beggars (1994)
- Another Way to Shine (1996)
- Mantra III (1998)
- Ad Astra (2000)
- On Fire (2002)
- Live Fire! (2005, DVD)
- Demons (2005)
- Return to Zero (2010)
- Return to Live (2011)
- Earth Blues (2013)
- Sunrise to Sundown (2016)

=== Arch Enemy ===
- Black Earth (1996)
- Stigmata (1998)
- Burning Bridges (1999)
- Burning Japan Live 1999 (2000)
- Wages of Sin (2001)
- Burning Angel (2002, EP, Japan only)
- Anthems of Rebellion (2003)
- Dead Eyes See No Future (2004, EP)
- Doomsday Machine (2005)
- Live Apocalypse (2006, 2-disc DVD)
- Rise of the Tyrant (2007)
- Tyrants of the Rising Sun (2008, 1-disc DVD, 2-disc CD, 2-Vinyl)
- The Root of All Evil (2009)
- Khaos Legions (2011, 1-disc CD, 2-disc CD, 2-Vinyl)
- War Eternal (2014, 1-disc CD, 3x-disc CD Artbook, 2-Vinyl)
- Stolen Life (2015, EP, Japan only)
- Will to Power (2017, 1-disc CD)
- Covered in Blood (2019)
- Deceivers (2022)
- Blood Dynasty (2025)

=== Black Earth ===
- Black Earth "20 Years of Dark Insanity: Japan Tour 2016" DVD + 2-CD (2017)
- Black Earth "Path of the Immortal" (2019)
- Black Earth "20 Years of Dark Insanity: Japan Tour 2016" Blu-ray (2019)

== Guest appearances ==
- 1992: Furbowl – Those Shredded Dreams (producer, guest lead guitar)
- 1994: Deranged – Architects of Perversions (additional lead guitar)
- 1997: Armageddon – Crossing the Rubicon (additional backing vocals)
- 1998: Candlemass – Dactylis Glomerata (additional lead & rhythm guitar)
- 2002: The Quill – Voodoo Caravan (additional lead guitar on the song "Shapes of Afterlife")
- 2003: The Haunted – One Kill Wonder (additional lead guitar trade-off with Anders Björler on the song "Bloodletting")
- 2005: Kreator – Enemy of God (additional lead guitar on the song "Murder Fantasies")
- 2007: Annihilator – Metal (additional lead guitar trade-off with Jeff Waters on the song "Operation Annihilation")
- 2010: Mojobone – "Cowboy Mode" (additional lead guitar on the song "Damaged Gods")
- 2011: Michael Schenker – Temple of Rock (additional lead guitar trade-off with Michael Schenker and Leslie West on the song How Long (3 Generations Guitar Battle version)).
- 2025: Soulfly - Chamas (lead guitar on the song "Ghenna")
