= Martin Bengtsson (musician) =

Swedish metal musician

- Also known as: Martin Bengtsson
- Born: 6 March 1974 (age 52); Halmstad, Sweden
- Genres: Melodic death metal, power metal
- Occupations: Musician, songwriter
- Instruments: Bass, guitar, vocals
- Years active: 1996–present
- Label: Century Media

Martin Bengtsson is a Swedish metal musician. He was a key part of the influential Swedish melodic death metal scene. He was a member of the melodic death metal band Arch Enemy between 1997 and 1998, and played bass guitar on their second album, Stigmata. He was also a member of Arch Enemy guitarist Christopher Amott's side project Armageddon in 1997. Bengtsson is currently the vocalist and lead guitarist in the heavy metal band Lechery.
