= Wages of Sin =

Studio album by Arch Enemy
- Released: 25 April 2001 (Japan); 18 March 2002 (other territories)
- Recorded: December 2000
- Studio: Studio Fredman
- Genre: Melodic death metal
- Length: 44:35
- Label: Century Media
- Producer: Fredrik Nordström, Michael Amott

Arch Enemy chronology
Burning Japan Live 1999 (2000)	Wages of Sin (2001)	Anthems of Rebellion (2003)

Singles from Wages of Sin
- 1. "Ravenous" Released: 2001; 2. "Burning Angel" Released: 6 March 2002

Professional ratings
Review scores
Source	Rating
AllMusic	3/5 stars
Blabbermouth.net	8/10
Chronicles of Chaos	8.5/10
Collector's Guide to Heavy Metal	6/10
Metal Storm	9.0/10

Wages of Sin is the fourth studio album by Swedish melodic death metal band Arch Enemy. It is the first Arch Enemy album to feature vocalist Angela Gossow. It is also their first album recorded in C tuning, starting a trend which continues across their discography. Wages of Sin was released on 25 April 2001 in Japan, but the European and American releases were delayed until 18 March 2002.

== Reception ==
Wages of Sin was well received by most critics, who praised the new singer Angela Gossow. Blake Jessop of Blistering said that she handles the vocals on the album expertly. But he wrote that "while less diverse than Liiva, the diminutive German's more traditional death metal style gives Wages an uncommonly brutal, if slightly less creative air." Jessop also states the album "musically, it is predictably brilliant".

Dennis of Lords of Metal said that "the female vocals by Angela Gossow are a remarkable performance" and that it was a big improvement compared to the former singer Johan Liiva. Jeff of Metal Storm stated that "with Wages of Sin, Arch Enemy delivers to us one of the best albums of the year 2002 and proves us by the same opportunity that girls are not relegated to only sing in atmospheric and gothic metal."

Ty Brookman and Jon Eardley of Metal Review was surprised with the Gossow vocals. Brookman commented that when he heard that Arch Enemy would have a female singer, his first reaction was "career suicide", but after to listen to the album, he changed his mind stating that "Gossow delivers a vocal tirade that rivals any male vocalist." Brookman praised the band, however, he said about the album that there are elements that seem lacking in a few places. Eardley said that this album has "one of the best vocal performances of 2001" and that it "is a true masterpiece."

Chris Flaaten of Chronicles of Chaos wrote that "the album has their best production to date and variety is abundant" and that the band found what they needed in Gossow. Despite Serge Regoor of Archaic Magazine states that her voice sounds great, he comments that "actually the vocals are much better too, but they are still not as good compared to the guitarwork."

Haavard Holm of Tartarean Desire praised the band writing that it "has capacities beyond the normal" and stated that "Wages of Sin is simply so well done in all ways, that it will be hard for any band to overcome this album in this genre." Another critic of Tartarean Desire, Vincent Eldefors, praised the singer Angela Gossow stating that she is one of the best lead vocalists in extreme metal along ex-Opera IX Cadaveria. Adam Bregman of AllMusic wrote that Gossow "is just the right touch to add to a band who ranks among metal's most progressive and unique outfits."

Blabbermouth.net's Borivoj Krgin praised the production of the album calling it "most impressive production job out of all the Arch Enemy albums." El Cid of Metal Rules praised the band stating that "this is arpeggio heaven amongst other things, the drumming is tight, the bass is excellent and the guitars are simply magnificent."

Jeff of Metal Storm liked of quality of the production and praised the songs and the musicians calling it of "simply excellent" and "simply brilliant", respectively. He said that "the Amott brothers are certainly among the best guitarists of today's metal scene."

=== Accolades ===
Wages of Sin won a Burrn! magazine award in the category Best Album.

== Track listing ==
Writing credits adapted from album booklet.

All lyrics written by Michael Amott, except where noted; all music written by Christopher Amott and Michael Amott, except where noted.

No.	Title	Lyrics	Music	Length
1.	"Enemy Within"	Angela Gossow		4:21
2.	"Burning Angel"			4:17
3.	"Heart of Darkness"			4:52
4.	"Ravenous"	Gossow, M. Amott		4:06
5.	"Savage Messiah"		M. Amott, Sharlee D'Angelo, C. Amott	5:18
6.	"Dead Bury Their Dead"		M. Amott	3:55
7.	"Web of Lies"			3:56
8.	"The First Deadly Sin"	Gossow, M. Amott		4:20
9.	"Behind the Smile"			3:28
10.	"Snow Bound"	Instrumental		1:34
11.	"Shadows and Dust"	Daniel Erlandsson, M. Amott		4:28
Total length:				44:35

bonus track
No.	Title	Lyrics	Length
12.	"Lament of a Mortal Soul"	Gossow	4:04
Total length:			48:39

A Collection of Rare & Unreleased Songs from the Arch Enemy Vault
No.	Title	Lyrics	Music	Length
1.	"Starbreaker" (Judas Priest cover)	Rob Halford, Glenn Tipton, K.K. Downing	Halford, Tipton, Downing	3:25
2.	"Aces High" (Iron Maiden cover)	Steve Harris	Harris	4:24
3.	"Scream of Anger" (Europe cover)	Joey Tempest	Marcel Jacob, Tempest	3:46
4.	"Diva Satanica"			3:43
5.	"Fields of Desolation '99"	Johan Liiva		6:02
6.	"Damnation's Way"	Liiva, M. Amott	Liiva, M. Amott	3:47
7.	"Hydra"	Instrumental	C. Amott, Fredrik Nordström	0:57
8.	"The Immortal" (music video)			3:57
Total length:				30:01

The first pressing of this album contains a bonus CD titled A Collection of Rare & Unreleased Songs from the Arch Enemy Vault. These songs feature the band's previous vocalist, Johan Liiva.

== Personnel ==
=== Arch Enemy ===
- Angela Gossow – vocals
- Michael Amott – guitars, production, layout
- Christopher Amott – guitars
- Sharlee D'Angelo – bass
- Daniel Erlandsson – drums

=== Production ===
- Fredrik Nordström − production, engineering
- Arch Enemy − engineering
- Per Wiberg − Mellotron, grand piano, keyboards
- Johan Liiva – vocals (on second disc)
- Andy Sneap – mixing, mastering
- Cabin Fever Media − artwork, layout
- Branko − band photography
- Adde − band photography
