= Burning Bridges (Arch Enemy album) =

Studio album by Arch Enemy
- Released: 21 May 1999
- Recorded: December 1998 – January 1999
- Studio: Studio Fredman
- Genre: Melodic death metal
- Length: 35:46
- Label: Century Media
- Producer: Fredrik Nordström, Michael Amott

Arch Enemy chronology
Stigmata (1998)	Burning Bridges (1999)	Burning Japan Live 1999 (2000)

Singles from Burning Bridges
- 1. "The Immortal" Released: 20 March 1999

Burning Bridges is the third studio album by Swedish melodic death metal band Arch Enemy. It is the first Arch Enemy album to feature Sharlee D'Angelo on bass and the last studio recording to feature vocalist Johan Liiva, as well as the last album to feature a male vocalist to date. The music here showcases the band's wide interpretation of the death metal genre to include portions of melodic death metal, progressive metal and grindcore. A music video was released for the song "The Immortal".

The album was reissued on 25 May 2009. Featuring original vocalist Johan Liiva, the reissue has a new layout, remastered sound, packaging and bonus tracks. It also contains original artwork, liner notes by Johan Liiva and a track-by-track commentary by guitarist Michael Amott.

== Reception ==
Professional ratings
Review scores
Source	Rating
AllMusic	4/5 stars
Chronicles of Chaos	9.5/10
Collector's Guide to Heavy Metal	9/10
Metal Hammer	8/10
Metal Rules	4/5

Burning Bridges was well received by critics. Steve Huey of AllMusic praised the album, writing:

"... having honed a potent blend of classic-style death metal, melodic twin-guitar leads à la the new wave of British heavy metal, touches of prog metal and of grindcore courtesy of later Carcass or Napalm Death, and just plain solid riff writing. Burning Bridges, their third effort, consolidates the gains made on its predecessor Stigmata, establishing Arch Enemy as a dependable force and one of the better bands working death metal territory as the '90s drew to a close."

Nathan Robinson of Metal Rules was surprised at the amount of fast material, although there are no blast beats, and praised the singer Johan Liiva stating that he "offers more variety this time, moving between his classic guttural belches to higher, blackened screeches. He truly delivers an impressive vocal performance!" He later highlights the songs "Silverwing", "The Immortal" and "Seed of Hate". Archaic Magazine's Ron Salden also praised Liiva's vocals and the production. Salden states that "they took the best of their first 2 albums and Burning Bridges is the amazing result!"

Sean Palmerston of Exclaim! writes that "the eight tracks contained within stand-up quite nicely with recent releases from The Haunted and Witchery as some of the best Swedish metal in recent times." Paul Schwarz of Chronicles of Chaos praised the songs highlighting "Pilgrim". He wrote: "What I love most, though, is the way Arch Enemy slip between the two different feels. "Pilgrim" begins with a hugely melodic, very heavy metal, lead/harmony part, but when Johan Liiva's crushing vocals enter, so does a heavy, percussive, death metal sounding verse riff, then, when the chorus comes in, the two opposites are expertly combined." Critics Ron Salden and Paul Schwarz stated that "this album will surely be one of the best releases in this year if not the best!" and that Arch Enemy "managed to pool their considerable talents and emerge with one of the year's best albums", respectively.

== Track listing ==
All lyrics are written by Michael Amott, except where noted; all music is composed by M. Amott and Christopher Amott, except where noted.

No.	Title	Lyrics	Music	Length
1.	"The Immortal"	Johan Liiva, M. Amott		3:43
2.	"Dead Inside"			4:13
3.	"Pilgrim"			4:33
4.	"Silverwing"			4:08
5.	"Demonic Science"			5:23
6.	"Seed of Hate"		C. Amott	4:09
7.	"Angelclaw"			4:06
8.	"Burning Bridges"		M. Amott	5:31
Total length:				35:46

European limited edition digipak
No.	Title	Lyrics	Music	Length
9.	"Diva Satanica"			3:46
10.	"Hydra"	Instrumental	C. Amott, Fredrik Nordström	0:57
Total length:				40:29

Japanese edition
No.	Title	Lyrics	Music	Length
9.	"Scream of Anger" (Europe cover)	Joey Tempest	Tempest, Marcel Jacob	3:50
10.	"Fields of Desolation '99"	Liiva		6:02
Total length:				45:38

Deluxe edition
No.	Title	Writer(s)	Length
9.	"Fields of Desolation '99" (from A Collection of Rare & Unreleased Songs from the Arch Enemy Vault)		6:02
10.	"Star Breaker" (from A Collection of Rare & Unreleased Songs from the Arch Enemy Vault)		3:27
11.	"Aces High" (Iron Maiden cover; from A Collection of Rare & Unreleased Songs from the Arch Enemy Vault)	Steve Harris	4:26
12.	"Scream of Anger" (Europe cover; from A Collection of Rare & Unreleased Songs from the Arch Enemy Vault)		3:50
13.	"The Immortal" (from Burning Japan Live 1999)		3:55
14.	"Dead Inside" (from Burning Japan Live 1999)		4:35
15.	"Pilgrim" (from Burning Japan Live 1999)		4:34
16.	"Silverwing" (from Burning Japan Live 1999)		4:16
17.	"Angelclaw" (from Burning Japan Live 1999)		4:39
Total length:			1:15:30

== Personnel ==
Personnel credits adapted from the album's liner notes.

=== Arch Enemy ===
- Johan Liiva − vocals
- Michael Amott − guitars, production
- Christopher Amott − guitars
- Sharlee D'Angelo − bass
- Daniel Erlandsson − drums

=== Production ===
- Fredrik Nordström − producer, engineer, keyboards
- Per Wiberg – Mellotron and grand piano on "Burning Bridges"
- Göran Finnberg – mastering
- Ulf Horbelt – re-mastering
- Anna Sofi Dahlberg – artwork, photography, layouts
- Tony Hunter – band photography
- Adde – band photography on page 16
- Media Logistics GmbH – additional layout
- Philipp Schulte – product coordination

== Charts ==
Chart (2023)	Peak position
Hungarian Albums (MAHASZ)	32
