= Tyrants of the Rising Sun =

Video by Arch Enemy
- Released: 24 November 2008
- Recorded: Recorded live in Tokyo, 8 March 2008
- Genre: Melodic death metal
- Label: Century Media

Arch Enemy chronology
| Live Apocalypse (2006) | Tyrants of the Rising Sun (2008) | As the Stages Burn! (2017) |

Tyrants of the Rising Sun is a DVD+CD set of Arch Enemy, released in Europe on 23 November 2008 and in North America on 25 November 2008 via Century Media. The DVD contains a live show filmed in Tokyo in early 2008, an in-depth 40 minute road-movie feature, and all promotional videos that have been shot for the band's seventh studio album, Rise of the Tyrant.

The DVD is available in the following versions: Deluxe edition DVD+2CDs, Standard DVD, Standard 2CDs, ltd EPs.

== Track listing ==
=== DVD ===
Tokyo Forum (8 March 2008)

| No. | Title | Lyrics | Music | Length |
|---|---|---|---|---|
| 1. | "Intro / Blood on Your Hands" | Angela Gossow | Michael Amott; Christopher Amott | 5:37 |
| 2. | "Ravenous" | Gossow; M. Amott | M. Amott; C. Amott | 3:55 |
| 3. | "Taking Back My Soul" | Gossow; M. Amott | M. Amott; C. Amott; Daniel Erlandsson | 5:16 |
| 4. | "Dead Eyes See No Future" | Gossow; M. Amott | M. Amott; C. Amott | 4:22 |
| 5. | "Dark Insanity" | Johan Liiva | M. Amott; Liiva | 3:59 |
| 6. | "The Day You Died" | Gossow; M. Amott | M. Amott; C. Amott; Erlandsson | 4:55 |
| 7. | "Christopher Solo" | Instrumental | C. Amott | 2:32 |
| 8. | "Silverwing" | M. Amott | M. Amott; C. Amott | 5:26 |
| 9. | "Night Falls Fast" | Gossow | M. Amott | 3:37 |
| 10. | "Daniel Solo" | Instrumental | Erlandsson | 3:30 |
| 11. | "Burning Angel" | M. Amott | M. Amott; C. Amott | 4:40 |
| 12. | "Michael Solo" | Instrumental | M. Amott | 3:24 |
| 13. | "Dead Bury Their Dead" | M. Amott | M. Amott | 4:57 |
| 14. | "Vultures" | Gossow | M. Amott; C. Amott | 6:51 |
| 15. | "Enemy Within" | Gossow | M. Amott; C. Amott | 4:29 |
| 16. | "Snow Bound" | Instrumental | M. Amott; C. Amott | 2:14 |
| 17. | "Shadows & Dust" | M. Amott; Erlandsson | M. Amott; C. Amott | 5:12 |
| 18. | "Nemesis" | Gossow | M. Amott; C. Amott; Erlandsson | 5:04 |
| 19. | "We Will Rise" | M. Amott | M. Amott; C. Amott | 4:33 |
| 20. | "Fields of Desolation / Enter the Machine (tape)" | Instrumental | M. Amott; C. Amott; Liiva; Erlandsson | 4:33 |
| Total length: | | | | 01:28:30 |

Special Features

1. The Road To Japan (Interviews / Road Movie) (approx. 45 minutes)

Promo videos

1. "Revolution Begins" (Original Version) (4:24)
2. "Revolution Begins" (Band Performance Version) (4:14)
3. "I Will Live Again" (3:34)

=== CD ===
Disc One

| No. | Title | Lyrics | Music | Length |
|---|---|---|---|---|
| 1. | "Intro / Blood on Your Hands" | Angela Gossow | Michael Amott; Christopher Amott | 5:37 |
| 2. | "Ravenous" | Gossow; M. Amott | M. Amott; C. Amott | 3:55 |
| 3. | "Taking Back My Soul" | Gossow; M. Amott | M. Amott; C. Amott; Daniel Erlandsson | 5:16 |
| 4. | "Dead Eyes See No Future" | Gossow; M. Amott | M. Amott; C. Amott | 4:22 |
| 5. | "Dark Insanity" | Johan Liiva | M. Amott; Liiva | 3:59 |
| 6. | "The Day You Died" | Gossow; M. Amott | M. Amott; C. Amott; Erlandsson | 4:55 |
| 7. | "Christopher Solo" | Instrumental | C. Amott | 2:32 |
| 8. | "Silverwing" | M. Amott | M. Amott; C. Amott | 5:26 |
| 9. | "Night Falls Fast" | Gossow | M. Amott | 3:37 |
| 10. | "Daniel Solo" | Instrumental | Erlandsson | 3:30 |

Disc Two

| No. | Title | Lyrics | Music | Length |
|---|---|---|---|---|
| 1. | "Burning Angel" | M. Amott | M. Amott; C. Amott | 4:40 |
| 2. | "Michael Solo" | Instrumental | M. Amott | 3:24 |
| 3. | "Dead Bury Their Dead" | M. Amott | M. Amott | 4:57 |
| 4. | "Vultures" | Gossow | M. Amott; C. Amott | 6:51 |
| 5. | "Enemy Within" | Gossow | M. Amott; C. Amott | 4:29 |
| 6. | "Snow Bound" | Instrumental | M. Amott; C. Amott | 2:14 |
| 7. | "Shadows & Dust" | M. Amott; Erlandsson | M. Amott; C. Amott | 5:12 |
| 8. | "Nemesis" | Gossow | M. Amott; C. Amott; Erlandsson | 5:04 |
| 9. | "We Will Rise" | M. Amott | M. Amott; C. Amott | 4:33 |
| 10. | "Fields of Desolation / Enter the Machine (tape)" | Instrumental | M. Amott; C. Amott; Liiva; Erlandsson | 4:33 |

== Personnel ==
- Angela Nathalie Gossow - Vocals
- Michael Amott - Guitar, backing vocals
- Christopher Amott - Guitar
- Sharlee D'Angelo - Bass
- Daniel Erlandsson - Drums
