= Black Earth (Arch Enemy album) =

Studio album by Arch Enemy
- Released: 2 October 1996
- Recorded: February–March 1996
- Studio: Studio Fredman
- Genre: Melodic death metal
- Length: 32:44
- Label: Wrong Again Regain (reissue) Century Media (reissue)
- Producers: Fredrik Nordström, Michael Amott

Arch Enemy chronology
| Black Earth (1996) | Stigmata (1998) |

Singles from Black Earth
- 1. "Bury Me an Angel" Released: 1996

Black Earth is the debut studio album by Swedish melodic death metal band Arch Enemy. Released on 2 October 1996 through Wrong Again, The album was reissued on 24 April 2007 through Regain Records, featuring "Losing Faith", two Iron Maiden covers and the video for "Bury Me an Angel". The album was reissued again on 28 April 2023 in various formats, along with a visualiser for “Dark Insanity”.

== Track listing ==
| No. | Title | Lyrics | Music | Length |
|---|---|---|---|---|
| 1. | "Bury Me an Angel" | Michael Amott | M. Amott | 3:40 |
| 2. | "Dark Insanity" | Johan Liiva | M. Amott; Liiva | 3:16 |
| 3. | "Eureka" | M. Amott | M. Amott; Christopher Amott | 4:44 |
| 4. | "Idolatress" | Liiva | M. Amott; Liiva | 4:56 |
| 5. | "Cosmic Retribution" | M. Amott | M. Amott | 4:00 |
| 6. | "Demoniality" | Instrumental | M. Amott | 1:19 |
| 7. | "Transmigration Macabre" | M. Amott | M. Amott | 4:09 |
| 8. | "Time Capsule" | Instrumental | C. Amott | 1:09 |
| 9. | "Fields of Desolation" | Liiva | M. Amott; C. Amott | 5:31 |
| Total length: | | | | 32:44 |

Century Media and Regain reissue edition
| No. | Title | Lyrics | Music | Length |
|---|---|---|---|---|
| 10. | "Losing Faith" | Liiva | M. Amott; C. Amott; Daniel Erlandsson | 3:16 |
| 11. | "The Ides of March" | Instrumental | Steve Harris | 1:46 |
| Total length: | | | | 37:46 |

Regain reissue edition
| No. | Title | Lyrics | Music | Length |
|---|---|---|---|---|
| 12. | "Aces High" | Harris | Harris | 4:23 |
| Total length: | | | | 42:09 |

"The Ides of March" and "Aces High" are covers of Iron Maiden songs, from the albums Killers and Powerslave respectively.

== Reception ==
Professional ratings
Review scores
| Source | Rating |
|---|---|
| AllMusic | 3.5/5 stars |
| Collector's Guide to Heavy Metal | 8/10 |

Black Earth was critically well received. Anders Sandvall of Metal Rules stated that "the album is brilliant and there are no bad songs on it." AllMusic's critic Alex Henderson wrote in his review that "Black Earth was a promising debut for Arch Enemy and is among the Swedish combo's more consistent and memorable efforts."

Ron Salden of Archaic Magazine said that Black Earth is a classic and praised the songs writing they "showcase a fresh mixture of death/thrash metal whilst the Amott brothers rip their guitars exquisitely to delightful bits of melody, harmony lines, guitar licks and solos." He praised "Bury Me an Angel" and comments that the songs "Eureka", "Transmigration Macabre" and "Fields of Desolation" still sounds fresh in these days. Chad Bowar of About.com said that the album sound "was raw, but the songs still were very catchy with solid guitar work from Michael and Christopher Amott".

About the songs, Metal Review's journalist Jason Jordan states: "'Dark Insanity' is arguably the best of the lot due to its fantastic riffs and leads, which Erlandsson backs up with a pummeling, and at times appropriately restrained, performance." He also comments that some songs like "Idolatress", "Cosmic Retribution", "Transmigration Macabre" and "Fields of Desolation" have praiseworthy characteristics too, though none quite match the verve of the openers. Jordan praised mainly the band members writing that "Black Earth is a solid outing of melodic death metal with each member in fine form", and that "the brothers Amott turn in excellent performances as the band's guitarists, Daniel Erlandsson provides backbone support from atop the throne, and Johan Liiva contributes his unique vocals to one of the better Arch Enemy efforts."

== Personnel ==
Personnel credits adapted from the album's liner notes.

=== Arch Enemy ===
- Johan Liiva – vocals, bass (credit only)
- Michael Amott – rhythm guitar, lead guitar, bass (uncredited), co-production, mixing, design
- Christopher Amott – lead guitar
- Daniel Erlandsson – drums

=== Production ===
- Fredrik Nordström – production, engineering, mixing, keyboards
- Wez Wenedikter – executive production, design
- Baskim Zuta – assistant engineering
- Miran Kim – cover art
- Kenneth Johansson – band photography
- Urszula Striner – model photography
- Sara Grundquist – model
- Johanna Lindskough – make-up artist
- M&A Music Art – layout
