= Christopher Amott =

Swedish guitarist (born 1977)

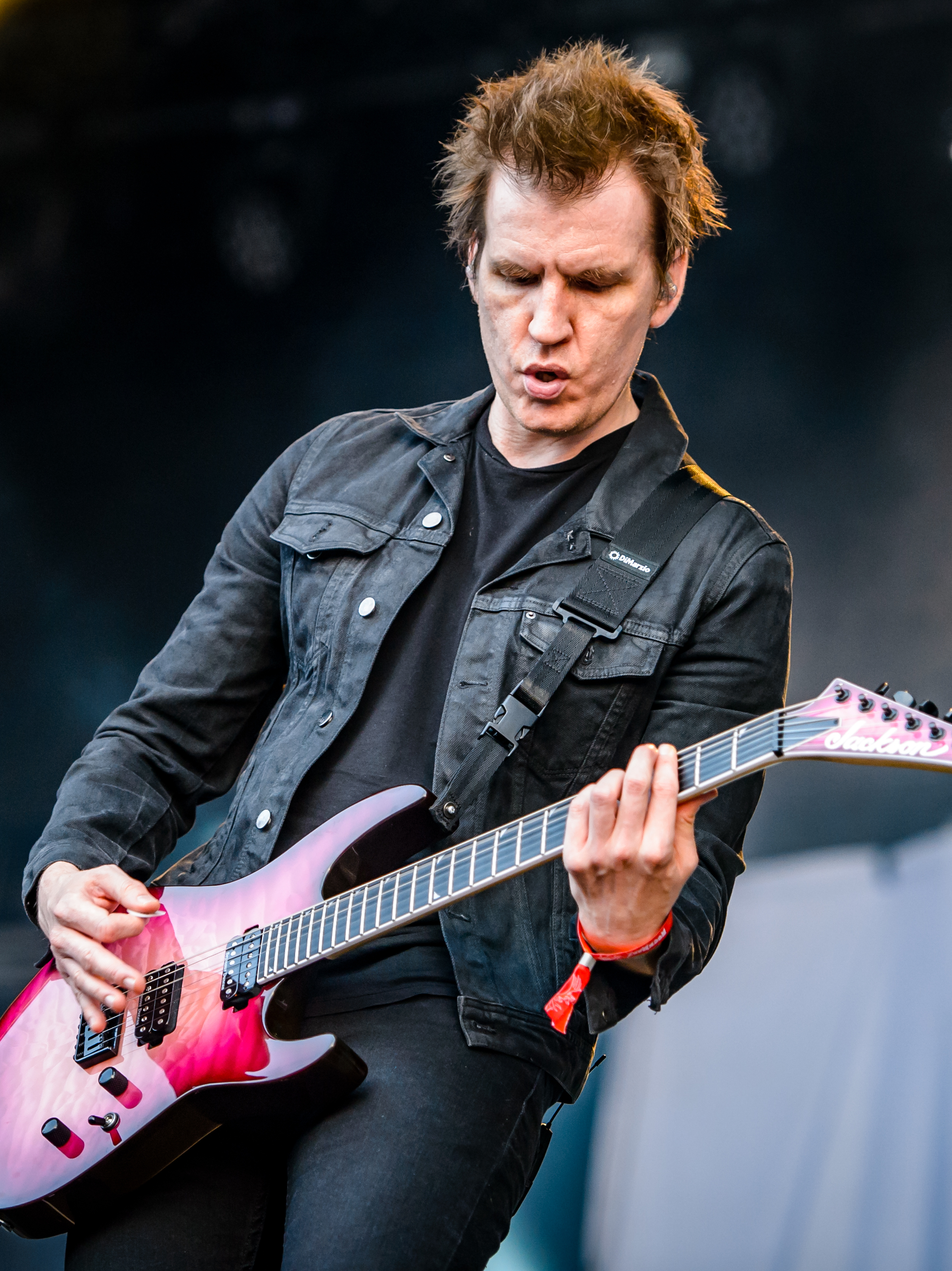
- Amott performing with Dark Tranquillity in 2017

Background information
- Also known as: Chris Amott
- Born: 23 November 1977 (age 48); Halmstad, Sweden
- Genres: Melodic death metal, power metal, thrash metal
- Occupation: Guitarist
- Years active: 1995–present
- Label: Century Media

Christopher Amott (born 23 November 1977) is a Swedish guitarist, younger brother of Michael Amott and founding member of the metal bands Arch Enemy and Armageddon. He is most recently the former guitarist for Dark Tranquillity.

== Biography ==
Amott was born in Halmstad. Inspired by his older brother Michael's band Carcass, he began studying the guitar at 14, playing in local bands, and eventually attending music college at age 18.

While attending music school in 1996, Michael asked Christopher to record solos for his new melodic death metal project Arch Enemy. The Black Earth album was released in Japan in 1996, and received regular airplay on Japanese MTV. The band were invited to play Japan in 1997, and it was there that Christopher secured a deal for his Armageddon side project. The project began as a melodic death metal band, similar in style to Arch Enemy. Armageddon released their first album Crossing the Rubicon on W.A.R. records in 1997. The album featured Peter Wildoer and Martin Bengtsson, who would also go on to record Stigmata with Arch Enemy in 1998. The Stigmata album was again a success in Japan, and was the first Arch Enemy album to be released in the US, on Century Media records.

With Arch Enemy gaining ground worldwide, Amott would go on to release Burning Bridges and Burning Japan Live 1999, both in 1999, then take a break until the latter part of 2000, when Armageddon released their second album Embrace the Mystery on Toy's Factory records in Japan. This time featuring a "melodic" singer, and more of an overall power metal feel, the album was a drastic shift from the straight ahead melodic death metal of Crossing the Rubicon, and marked Christopher's desire to branch out of the "extreme metal" genre. Also in 2000, he played a guitar solo on "Suburban Me" on the album Clayman with In Flames.

In 2001, Arch Enemy were joined by singer Angela Gossow, and released Wages of Sin. After completing an extensive world tour with Arch Enemy, Amott returned to his Armageddon project, and released Three in 2002 on Toy's Factory records in Japan. This time featuring Christopher on lead vocals, the album was almost purely a power metal effort, focusing on the melodic singing and guitar work of Amott.

Arch Enemy released Anthems of Rebellion in 2003, and again embarked on a world tour. In 2005, the band entered the studio to record Doomsday Machine, but immediately after the recording, Amott left Arch Enemy. He spent the next two years teaching music in Sweden, as well as attending a university. In March 2007, he announced his return to Arch Enemy as a permanent member. He re-joined the band near the end of the songwriting process for Rise of the Tyrant.

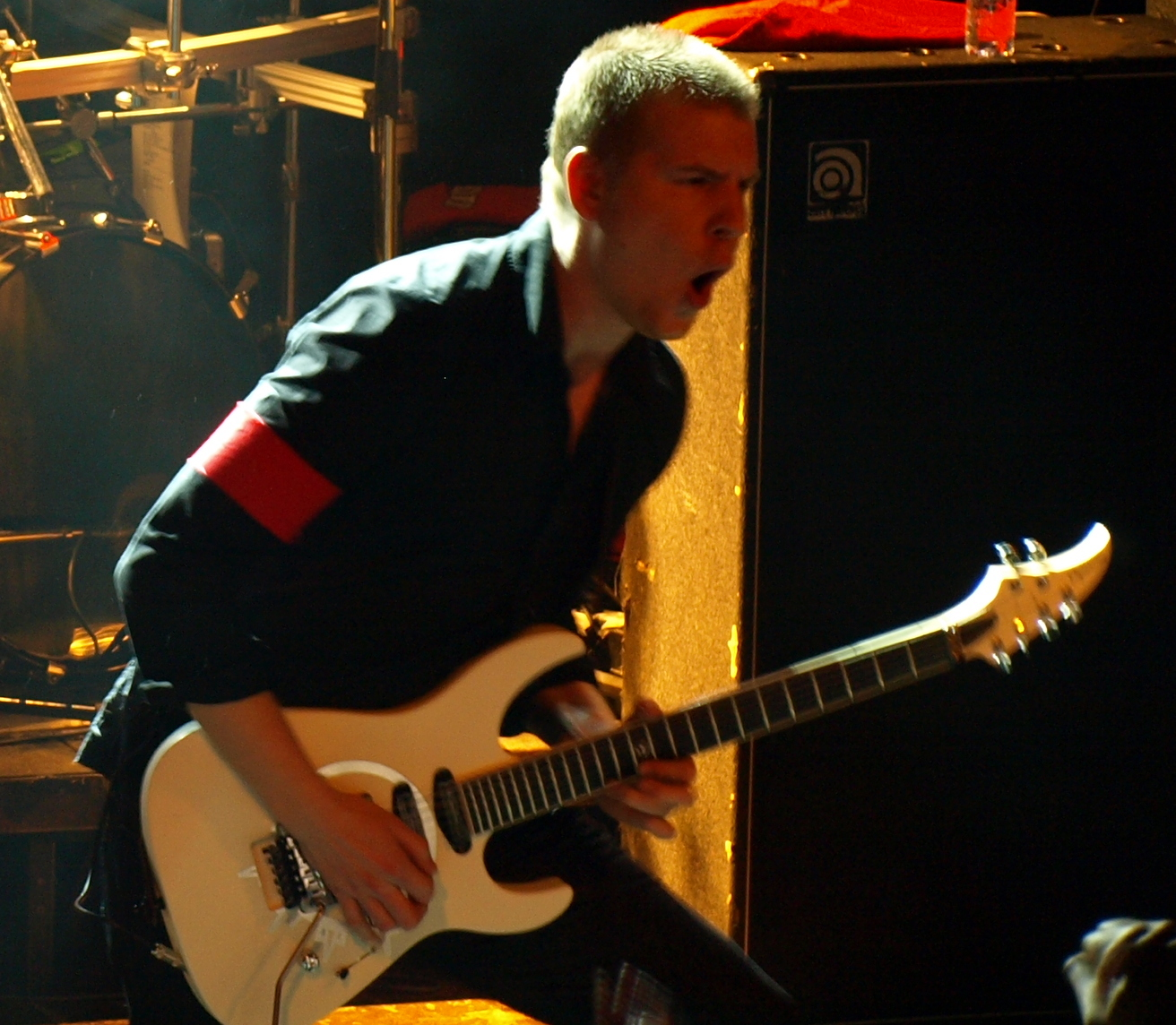
Amott performing with Arch Enemy in 2008

In an interview in January 2010, Amott said that he would be releasing a solo album early in the year entitled "Follow Your Heart".

On 5 March 2012, Amott once again quit Arch Enemy. He cited his desire to pursue his solo career further as the main reason. He was replaced with Arsis guitarist Nick Cordle. In April 2012, he moved to New York City, United States. After obtaining a green card in the beginning of 2013, he stated that he intended to record a new Armageddon record, which was planned to be released by summer 2013. Amott also collaborated with Japanese pop/metal band Babymetal, providing guitars for an alternate version of their major label debut single, "Ijime, Dame, Zettai" nicknamed the "Nemesis" version (possibly named after the Arch Enemy song of the same name).

In 2014, Amott began recording for the new Armageddon album with a new lineup consisting of himself, vocalist Matt Hallquist, guitarist Joey Concepcion, bassist Sara Claudius, and drummer Márton Veress. Their new album, entitled "Captivity & Devourment", is set to be released in January 2015 on Listenable Records. Now enlisted Meridian Dawn/ex-Nightrage vocalist Antony Hämäläinen as their replacement for the recently departed Matt Hallquist.

During Arch Enemy's North American tour in support of their album War Eternal, guitarist Nick Cordle reportedly left the band. Amott temporarily re-joined the band for the remainder of the tour, while famed guitarist Jeff Loomis (formerly of Nevermore) was announced as the official replacement and joined the band for their European tour with Kreator and subsequent events.

On 10 October 2015, as part of Japan's Loud Park Festival, Arch Enemy vocalist Alissa White-Gluz invited special guests Amott and Johan Liiva to the stage, reuniting the Burning Bridges lineup. They would go on to perform "Bury Me an Angel" and "The Immortal", before being joined by White-Gluz and Jeff Loomis to perform "Fields of Desolation" together.

While Armageddon and Arch Enemy were touring together in Mexico 2016. Amott made a guest appearance on Arch Enemy and performed two songs, "Revolution Begins" and "Blood On Your Hands".

Starting on 23 May 2016, Amott along with the original Arch Enemy lineup reunited as Project Black Earth and made a special tour in Japan. The band performed the Black Earth album in its entirety. Songs from Stigmata and Burning Bridges were also played. The tour lasted for about a week.

In 2017, Amott began touring with Dark Tranquillity, initially to help out the band with their European tour, and continued to tour with them throughout 2018 in Europe and North America. On 30 March 2020 it was announced that Amott and Johan Reinholdz had officially replaced original guitarist Niklas Sundin. Amott played on the band's 2020 album Moment, before departing the band in July 2023.

Amott released his third solo album Electric Twilight on January 30 2020. It is largely a synthwave album, strongly contrasting with the rest of his discography.

== Discography ==
=== Arch Enemy ===
==== As full member ====
- Black Earth (1996)
- Stigmata (1998)
- Burning Bridges (1999)
- Burning Japan Live 1999 (1999)
- Wages of Sin (2001)
- Burning Angel (2002)
- Anthems of Rebellion (2003)
- Dead Eyes See No Future (2004, EP)
- Doomsday Machine (2005)
- Live Apocalypse (2006, 2-disc DVD)
- Rise of the Tyrant (2007)
- Tyrants of the Rising Sun (2008)
- The Root of All Evil (2009)
- Khaos Legions (2011)

==== As guest ====
- Will to Power (2017) - Keyboards, guitar and songwriting on "Reason To Believe", songwriting on "Dreams of Retribution".
- Deceivers (2022) - Songwriting on "Poisoned Arrow".

=== Armageddon ===
- Crossing the Rubicon (1997)
- Embrace the Mystery (2000)
- Three (2002)
- Captivity & Devourment (2015)
- Crossing the Rubicon (Revisited) (2016)

=== Dark Tranquillity ===
- Moment (2020)

=== Solo ===
- Follow Your Heart (2010)
- Impulses (2012)
- Electric Twilight (2020)
