= Angela Gossow =

German metal vocalist

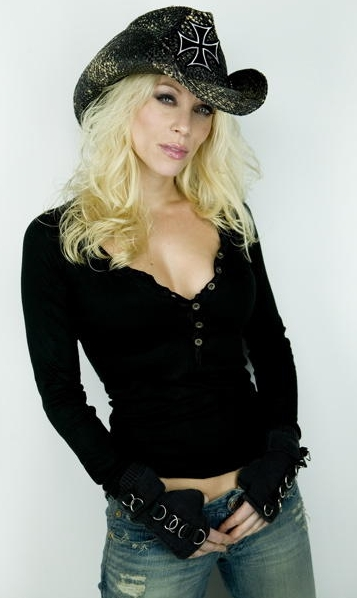
- Angela Gossow in 2008

Background information
- Born: Angela Nathalie Gossow; 5 November 1974 (age 51); Cologne, West Germany
- Genres: Melodic death metal; thrash metal; death metal
- Occupation: Singer
- Years active: 1991–2014, 2020
- Website: angelagossow.com

Angela Nathalie Gossow (born 5 November 1974) is a German vocalist, best known as the former lead singer for the Swedish melodic death metal band Arch Enemy. Her other previous bands include Asmodina and Mistress.

== Early life ==
Angela Gossow was born to Christian parents in Cologne, Germany, and had three siblings. She was 17 when her parents divorced. Further financial troubles came in when their business went bankrupt. Being anorexic and bulimic further added to her woes. It was at this time that she decided to move out of home and join the metal band Asmodina. After graduation she joined an advertising company as a trainee, specializing in marketing. She simultaneously began studying economics. In 1997, the band Asmodina split and Gossow formed another band: Mistress.

== Career ==
=== Arch Enemy ===
Gossow joined Arch Enemy in November 2000, after the removal of lead singer Johan Liiva. She had previously interviewed guitarist Michael Amott for a German webzine. While interviewing Amott, Gossow gave him a demo that she described as a "poor quality" video of a performance at a club. After firing Liiva in 2000, the band called in Gossow for an audition. Amott later said that "she wiped the floor with all the other contenders." She then proceeded to record Wages of Sin with Arch Enemy.

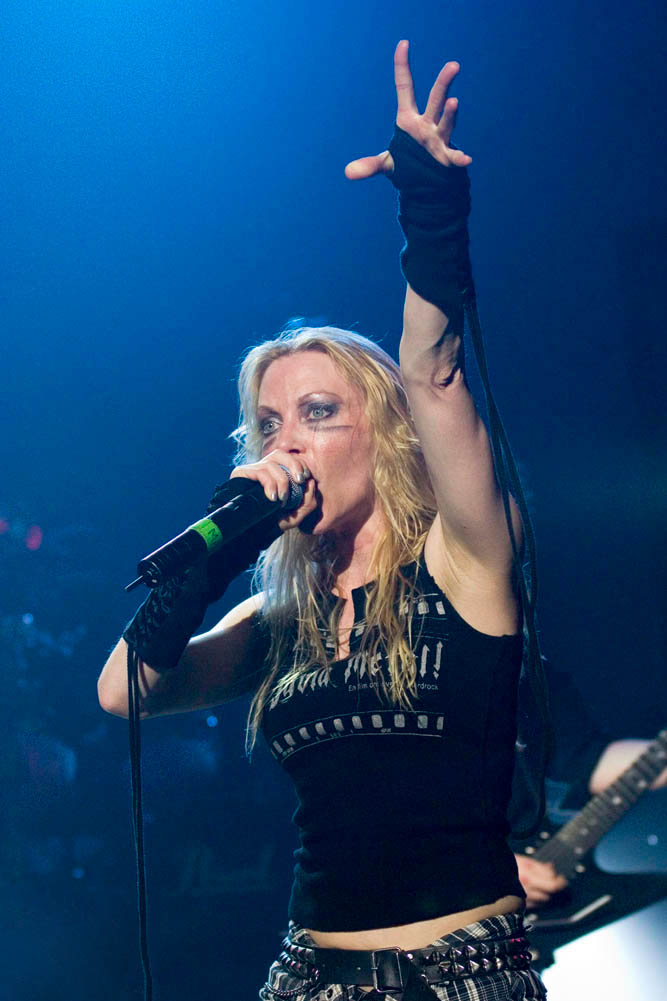
in São Paulo, Brazil, 2007

On the eve of a 2002 tour, Gossow was diagnosed with nodules, which almost stopped her from growling. However, after some vocal therapy, she was able to recover her voice and she proceeded to begin taking piano and screaming lessons from renowned coach Melissa Cross. She continues to work in close conjunction with her.

On 17 March 2014, it was announced that Gossow was stepping down as Arch Enemy vocalist to pursue other interests and spend more time with her family. Gossow recommended Alissa White-Gluz from Canadian metal band The Agonist as her replacement, and will remain business manager for the band.

=== Other work ===
In addition to managing Arch Enemy, Gossow also manages the bands Spiritual Beggars, Amaranthe and Obscura. She performed guest vocals on Amaranthe's 2020 single, "Do or Die", and was featured in the song's music video, making it Gossow's first musical performance in 8 years.

Gossow provides the voice for the recurring character Lavona Succuboso in the animated television show Metalocalypse. According to an interview with Musiikki TV at the Frostbite Festival 2009, Gossow did guest vocals on the Astarte album Demonized, on the song "Black at Heart".

Gossow features on Melissa Cross's 2nd DVD release The Zen of Screaming 2 released by Melissa Cross. Apart from being on the cover pages of many leading magazines, she was also voted the "best singer" and "shining star" at the Burrn! magazine awards in 2002. Since 2008 she has been the manager for Spiritual Beggars.

Gossow expressed interest in starting a new extreme metal project in 2018 after Arch Enemy's touring cycle for Will to Power, stating "Yes, I want to make a new extreme metal project, but this will happen after Arch Enemy and work with Alissa [White-Gluz] will be concluded and the whole world will sail in calmer waters. I suppose this will be in 2018, when we concluded the first series of tours and all the rest. I will do so when the time comes."

== Musical style and influences ==
Gossow is one of the first among a small number of women to front as a death metal vocalist. She has a mezzo-soprano vocal range, with a death growl. She uses false cord screams. Her main influences are Jeff Walker of Carcass, David Vincent of Morbid Angel, John Tardy of Obituary, and Chuck Schuldiner of Death.

== Personal life and beliefs ==
Angela Gossow has been outspoken with her views, generally reflecting them in the lyrics of her songs. She is an atheist and politically considers herself a liberal-green anarchist, but votes "to make sure the right-wing doesn't get her vote." She vapes cannabis and credits it for a significant improvement in her asthma, and has supported its legalisation. Gossow is a teetotaler and non-smoker.

== Discography ==
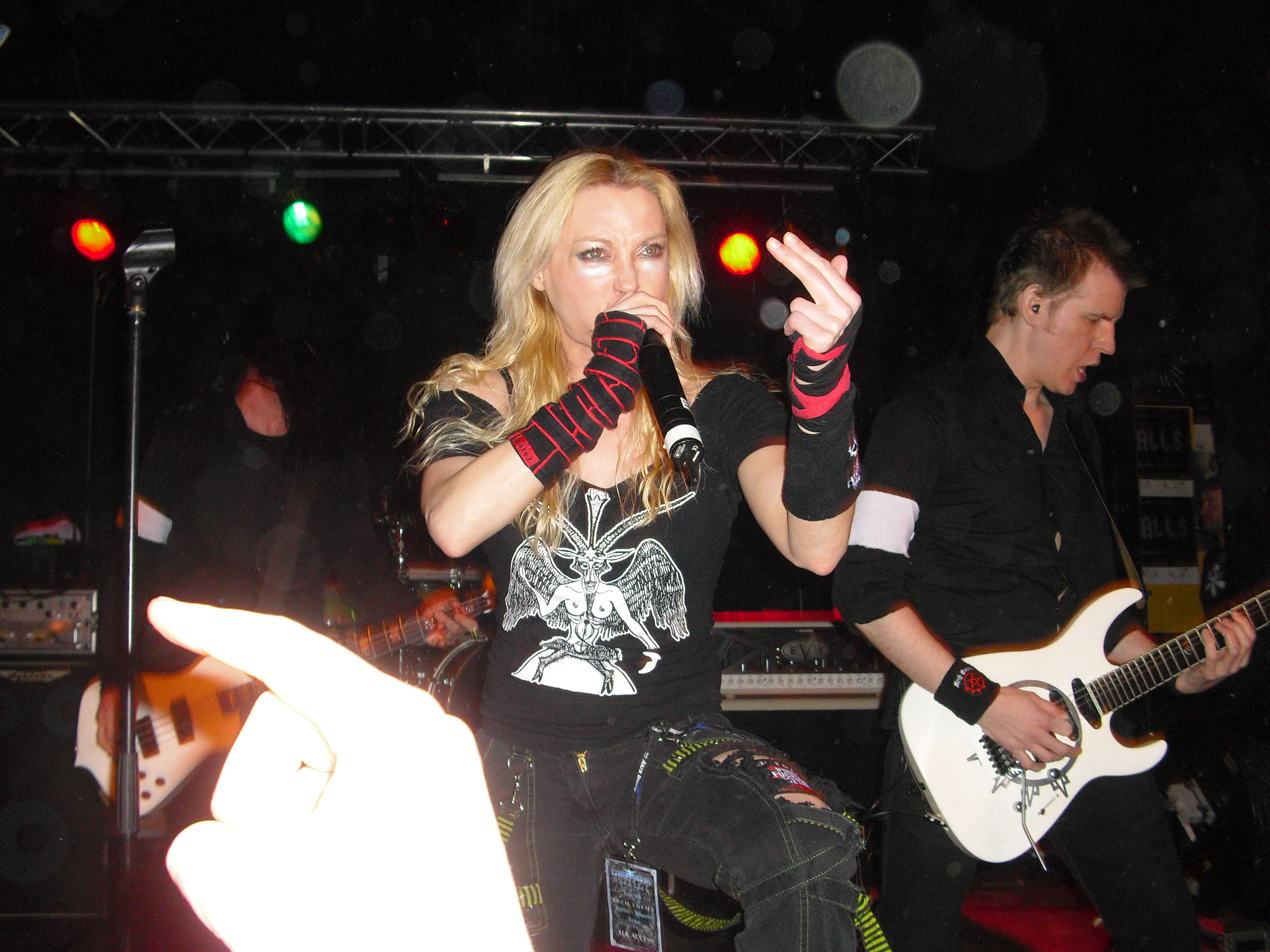
Gossow with Arch Enemy in 2010

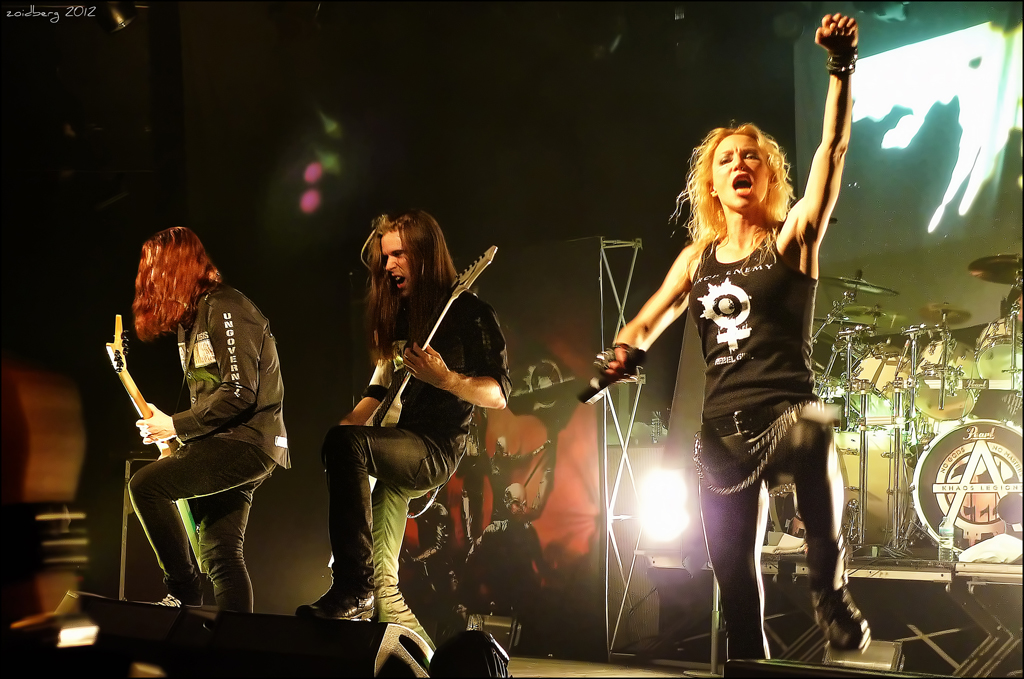
Gossow (right) in October 2012

=== With Asmodina ===
- Your Hidden Fear (Demo, 1991)
- The Story of the True Human Personality (Demo, 1994)
- Promo 1996 (Demo, 1996)
- Inferno (1997)

=== With Mistress ===
- Mistress (Demo, 1998)
- Worship the Temptress (Demo, 1999)
- Party in Hell (Demo, 2000)

=== With Arch Enemy ===
- Wages of Sin (2001)
- Burning Angel (2002, EP)
- Anthems of Rebellion (2003)
- Dead Eyes See No Future (2004, EP)
- Doomsday Machine (2005)
- Live Apocalypse (2006, 2-disc DVD)
- Revolution Begins (2007, EP)
- Rise of the Tyrant (2007)
- Tyrants of the Rising Sun (2008)
- The Root of All Evil (2009)
- Khaos Legions (2011)

=== Guest appearances ===
- Annihilator – Couple Suicide (2007)
- Astarte – Black at Heart (2007)
- Amaseffer – Midian (2008)
- Doro – Celebrate (The Night of the Warlock) (2008)
- Doro – Celebrate (2009)
- Kalisia – Cybion (2009)
- Never – Questions Within, Painted Black (Back to the Front album, 2009 Spiritual Beast)
- Rise – Pentagramnation (2009)
- Amaranthe – Do or Die (2020)

== See also ==
- Anarchism in Germany

Preceded by Johan Liiva	Vocalist for Arch Enemy; 2000–2014	Succeeded by Alissa White-Gluz
