= Metal Rules =

Heavy metal webzine

- Website type: Online music magazine
- Founded: 1995; 31 years ago
- Country of origin: Canada
- Owner: EvilG
- Founder: EvilG
- Website: metal-rules.com
- Commercial: Yes
- Current status: Active

Metal Rules, also known as Metal-Rules, is a heavy metal webzine established in 1995 by owner and editor EvilG. Based in the province of Newfoundland, Canada, the site was founded to promote "Real Metal," which is one of the world's largest and longest-running heavy metal websites. As of 2024, the site lists an international staff of 16 members, and half a dozen additional contributors from around the world, including Canada, the United States, England, Sweden, Finland, Australia, Malaysia, Estonia, and most recently, India. As of March 2007, the site was receiving between 1.2 and 1.5 million page views per month, and had 4,400 registered forum users and more than 2,000 newsletter subscribers.

The website contains a wide range of features, including news, CDs, and DVDs as well as book reviews, concert reviews, and interviews. The site has almost 16,000 CD reviews, almost 600 DVD reviews, over 2,600 interviews with musicians and metal fans, and over 2000 concert reviews. In the summer of 2011, Metal-Rules introduced a new section called The Library Of Loudness, specializing in hard rock and heavy metal book reviews. This section currently has over 800 book reviews. The site also has several Internet chat forums, with over 100,000 registered members since its inception. Other features include audio and video streaming, interactive polls, editorial pieces, cartoons, guitar samples and tabs, tour blogs, and more.

Metal Rules, alongside Metal Sludge, was cited in a New York Times article, after the death of Dimebag Darrell in 2004. Its tribute to Ronnie James Dio was featured on Brave Words & Bloody Knuckles's website. It received praise from the heavy metal world.

== Metal Rules Records ==
In 2002, the site founded Metal Rules Records. On December 30, 2002, Metal-Rules Records released their first album, Metal-Rules.com Volume I. The album is a 16-track compilation CD, featuring songs from heavy metal bands worldwide. The CD was mastered by Mark Briody of Jag Panzer. On July 24, 2004, the label released its second record, The Predator Awakens by Viperine.
