= Daniel Erlandsson =

Swedish drummer

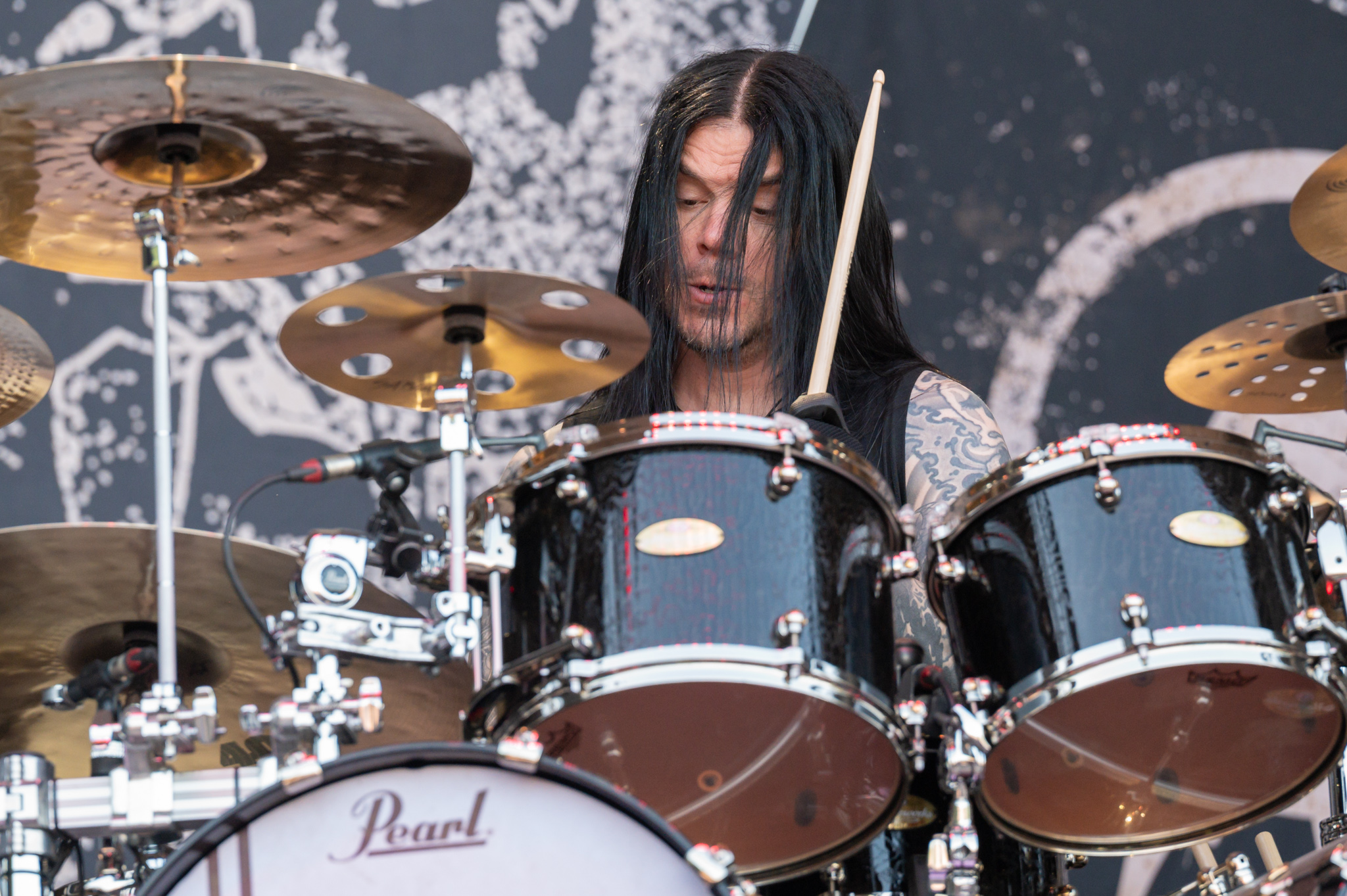
- Erlandsson performing with Arch Enemy in 2023

Background information
- Born: Daniel John Erlandsson; 22 May 1976 (age 50); Malmö, Sweden
- Genres: Melodic death metal; death metal; grindcore; thrash metal
- Occupation: Drummer
- Years active: 1990–present
- Website: archenemy.net

Daniel John Erlandsson (born 22 May 1976) is a Swedish musician, best known as the drummer in the melodic death metal band Arch Enemy and as former drummer of extreme metal bands Carcass and Brujeria.

His early work includes drumming on the In Flames album Subterranean (1995). He has also played for other bands, most notably Eucharist, Liers in Wait, Diabolique, Armageddon (featuring Christopher Amott of Arch Enemy), Revengia and The End.

Erlandsson was born in Malmö. His older brother is Adrian Erlandsson, the drummer of At the Gates, The Haunted, Brujeria, Paradise Lost and Vallenfyre and the former drummer of Cradle of Filth. They both grew up together in Sweden and started playing drums at a very young age. Daniel writes on the Arch Enemy website: "We grew up together and used to jam on a little kit in our parents basement, he started first and after some years I started too... He's been a great influence over the years, and if it wasn't for him I probably wouldn't be playing today."

He formerly played reunion shows with extreme metal band Carcass from 2007 to 2010 as their original drummer Ken Owen could not play due to complications from a brain hemorrhage he had in 1999. Both he and fellow Arch Enemy member Michael Amott left Carcass in 2012, with Erlandsson being replaced by former Aborted and current Trigger the Bloodshed drummer Daniel Wilding.

In 2012, he was hired by the band Brujeria, under the name "El Clavador".

== Equipment ==
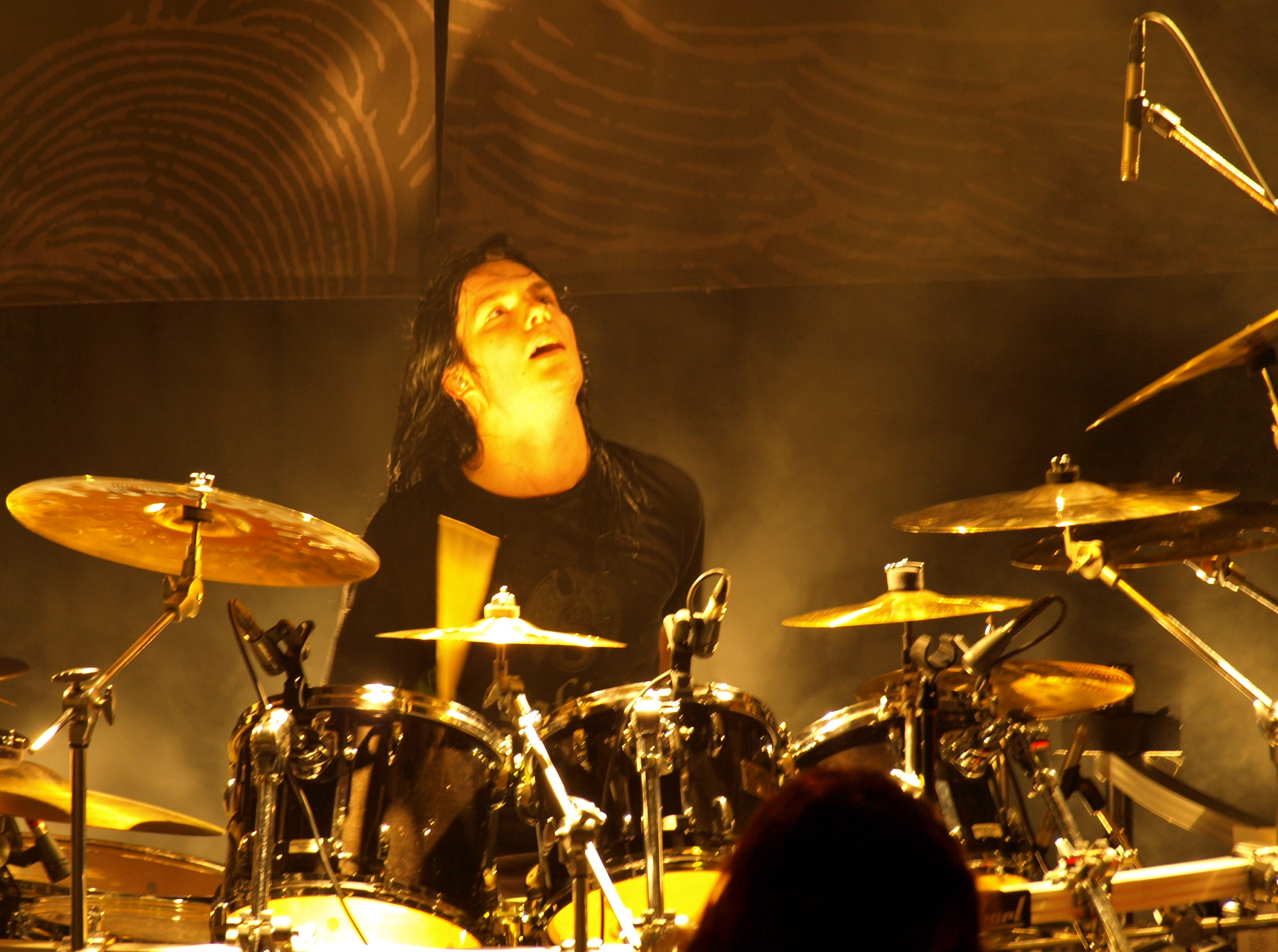
Erlandsson with Arch Enemy in 2008

Pearl Reference Pure Drums (Ivory Pearl #330)

- 22x18 bass drum (x2)
- 10x8 tom
- 12x9 tom
- 13x10 tom
- 16x16 floor tom
- 18x16 floor tom
- 20x14 gong drum
- 14x5.5 Daniel Erlandsson signature snare drum

(Source:)

Pearl ICON rack system and hardware

- DR-503 ICON rack
- DR-501 front rack
- RJ-50 mini extension bar
- PCX-200 rack clamp (x4)
- PCX-100 rack clamp (x11)
- CH-2030 boom arm (x11)
- H-2000 hi hat stand
- P-3000 bass drum pedal (x2)
- S-1030 snare drum stand
- TH-1030i tom holder (x4)
- CLH-930 closed hi hat arm
- D-2500 drum throne
