= Deceivers Asia Tour =

2024 concert tour by Arch Enemy

- Tour by Arch Enemy
- Associated album: Deceivers
- Start date: April 24, 2024
- End date: May 23, 2024
- No. of shows: 16
Arch Enemy tour chronology
European Tour (2023)	Deceivers Asia Tour (2024)	Rising from the North (2024)

Deceivers Asia Tour was a concert tour headlined by Swedish melodic death metal band Arch Enemy. The tour was announced on January 20, 2024 and general ticket sales for the shows began on various dates within the following weeks. The first show of the tour was April 24, 2024 in Seoul, South Korea and the closing night of the tour was May 23, 2024 in Jakarta, Indonesia.

== Background ==
Deceivers Asia Tour was the most extensive Asian tour in Arch Enemy's career, featuring 16 shows in 8 different countries. The band had previously performed in Indonesia and Malaysia once (in 2009 and 2012 respectively)

Deceivers Asia Tour was Arch Enemy's first tour in over eight months, following their European tour in summer 2023. This tour was also the band's first tour with new guitarist Joey Concepcion, who joined the band in December 2023 following the departure of long-time guitarist Jeff Loomis. Concepcion performed with Arch Enemy twice in 2018, but the show in Seoul on April 24, 2024 was his first show as an official member of Arch Enemy.

This was the final tour of the Deceivers album cycle, as the band's next tour (Rising from the North) would be in promotion of their next album, Blood Dynasty.

== Development ==
Arch Enemy offered VIP upgrades for the tour, allowing fans access to perks such as meeting the band, receiving exclusive merchandise and early entry to the venue. Arch Enemy's VIP upgrades were released alongside general ticket sales.

On May 10, 2024, it was announced via the band's social media profiles that their sold-out show at Mr. Fox Live House in Bangkok eleven days later was upgraded to the larger venue Hollywood Ratchada Soi 4.

== Critical reception ==
The tour received many positive reviews from critics, who commented on the vocal prowess and stage presence of frontwoman Alissa White-Gluz, as well as visual elements such as lighting.

An impressive review of the "electrifying performance" in Manila on May 15 was written by Arielle Elep (for philippineconcerts.com). Elep observed the show's audience, noting "the Filipino crowd erupted into a frenzy of headbanging and occasional mosh pits", and praised the band's setlist full of old and new tunes, commenting that "each song [was] met with thunderous applause and fervent enthusiasm".

== Tour dates ==
List of concerts, showing date, city, country, venue and support act(s)
Date	City	Country	Venue	Support act(s)
April 24, 2024	Seoul	South Korea	Musinsa Garage	—N/a
April 26, 2024	Beijing	China	Fu Lang LiveHouse	—N/a
April 28, 2024	Shanghai	China	Phase Live House	—N/a
April 30, 2024	Guangzhou	China	Space Live House	—N/a
May 2, 2024	Nanping	China	Dawuyi Music Square	—N/a
May 3, 2024	Xi'an	China	Planet Factory	—N/a
May 5, 2024	Chengdu	China	Aflame Art Center	—N/a
May 7, 2024	Nanjing	China	Daxxinggong	—N/a
May 9, 2024	Shenzhen	China	NuBond LiveHouse	—N/a
May 11, 2024	Taipei	Taiwan	Hana Live House	M.E.L.T; Eureka
May 12, 2024	Taichung	Taiwan	Legacy	M.E.L.T; Eureka
May 15, 2024	Manila	Philippines	Skydome	—N/a
May 17, 2024	Singapore	Singapore	*SCAPE The Ground Theatre	—N/a
May 19, 2024	Kuala Lumpur	Malaysia	Zepp	Amalgama; Dezember
May 21, 2024	Bangkok	Thailand	Hollywood Ratchada Soi 4^{[A]}	Amalgama; Dezember
May 23, 2024	Jakarta	Indonesia	Bali United Studio^{[B]}	Burgerkill; Noxa; Konfliktion; Straightout; Modern Guns; Ejakula La Vampira

- A This show was originally scheduled to take place at Mr. Fox Live House.
- B This show was originally scheduled to take place at Kota Peruri.

== Personnel ==
=== Arch Enemy ===
- Alissa White-Gluz – lead vocals
- Michael Amott – guitar, backing vocals
- Joey Concepcion – guitar
- Sharlee D'Angelo – bass
- Daniel Erlandsson – drums

=== Additional personnel ===
- François Ouellet – tour manager
- Kusch Kuschnerus – drum technician
- Martin Müller – light technician
