= Grindmother =

- Origin: Windsor, Ontario, Canada
- Genre: Grindcore
- Years active: 2015–2025
- Label: Independent

Grindmother was a Canadian grindcore band centered around its eponymous vocalist and her son, guitarist and producer Rayny Forster. The band became internationally known after viral videos of the elderly vocalist performing harsh grindcore vocals circulated online in 2015. They released their first and only album "Age of Destruction" on April 28th, 2016 and toured in support of the album up until early 2018. The band would perform their first 'farewell' show on December 5th, 2025 following Grindmother's diagnosis with dementia. The show was held at (a sold out) Club Soda in Montreal, and featured guest vocalists Chelsea Marrow (Visitant), Liz Selfish (Brat), and Alissa White-Gluz (Blue Medusa, ex-Arch Enemy).

The "iconic grindcore matriarch" was born August 13, 1948 (age 78) and performs under the stage name Grindmother, the persona associated with the project. Her real name is not publicly known.

The band’s name combines the word “grandmother” with grindcore, an extreme metal genre characterized by fast tempos and aggressive vocals.

While grindcore is a niche subgenre, Grindmother's popularity is significant within that community and extends to broader internet culture due to a wide array of media coverage ranging from underground to mainstream.

Media coverage frequently emphasized the contrast between her age and the intensity of the music. Alternative Press noted that she might be “one of the coolest 67-year-olds you’ll ever come across.”

OC Weekly described the performances more bluntly:

Grindmother is brutal. She’s scary. This is actually the best thing to happen to grindcore music this year.

Despite early novelty framing, critics quickly noted the musical quality of the project. Metal Injection wrote:

It would be easy to dismiss something like this as a gimmick, but the music speaks for itself…after listening I’m legitimately impressed.

== Origins ==
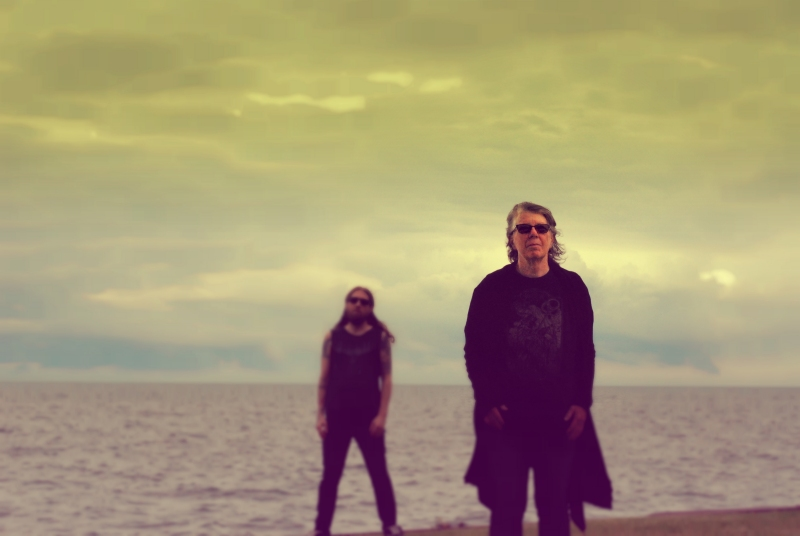
Grindmother (right) and her son, guitarist Rayny Forster (left) at the Detroit River in Windsor, Ontario in 2017.

The project began in Windsor, Ontario when guitarist Rayny Forster invited his mother to try recording vocals for a grindcore song.

The result surprised both of them. In later interviews, Grindmother recalled:

I didn’t know that sound could come out of me, but it felt good. I felt alive.

The collaboration quickly evolved into a full musical project, with Grindmother becoming the band’s namesake vocalist.

Forster wrote and produced much of the music while his mother contributed most of the lyrics. Speaking about the recording sessions she explained:

My son showed me how to sing on the record.

Outside of music, Grindmother had worked as a social worker. Media profiles often highlighted the contrast between the brutality of the music and her everyday life, noting her interests in organic gardening and meditation.

Both she and Rayny are long-time vegetarians.

Rayny has also worked as a screen printer, graphic designer, and cannabis industry specialist.

== Breakthrough and viral success (2015) ==
The band first gained international attention in 2015 with the release of the video for their debut single “Any Cost.”

The song’s lyrics criticized political leadership and were directed toward Canadian prime minister Stephen Harper.

The video spread rapidly online. One publication wrote that the clip had been “exploding over the internet.”

One particularly notable moment came when Ozzy Osbourne shared the video on social media. The post stood out because it was reportedly the only tweet on his timeline unrelated to his own music or Black Sabbath.

Forster later noted that the moment carried personal meaning because Black Sabbath is his favorite band, and he had attended several of their concerts.

== Age of Destruction (2016) ==
Cover artwork for Grindmother "Age of Destruction", created January 2016 by Rayny Forster.

The band released its debut album Age of Destruction in 2016.

The record addressed themes including war, corruption, depression, corporate greed, environmentalism, and spirituality.

=== Album Reception ===
Critics broadly agreed that the album is a legitimate and effective grindcore release rather than a novelty. Popshifter stated “this is a grindcore album and it is deadly serious and amazing,” adding it “would still deserve the attention it’s getting” regardless of context. KaaosZine described it as “a tight grindcore from start to finish” with “dark and dystopian” lyrics, while Metal Impact also emphasized the album’s strength as a cohesive and serious grindcore work.

Reviewers also highlighted the album’s musicianship and production. Metal Impact praised it as “a damn good, powerful album, with ten solid tracks,” noting “instantly memorable” riffs, “a production worthy of the genre’s finest releases,” and adding that “Rayny Forster is certainly a seasoned composer of extreme metal.” The same review also noted the album’s strong songwriting and overall execution within the genre.

Grindmother’s vocal performance was frequently singled out as a defining strength. Manic Mosh Magazine wrote that the band “has taken the metal world by storm,” highlighting a voice that “easily outdoes male shouters half her age.” Across publications, critics consistently emphasized both the intensity of the vocals and the band’s distinctive lyrical perspective as key elements that set Age of Destruction apart within grindcore.

== Touring ==
The band began performing live in 2017, playing 60 tour dates across North America and Japan.

They toured with bands including ACxDC, Cloud Rat, Escuela Grind, Seeker, Cognitive, Worm, Alterbeast, Aethere, Inferi, The Kennedy Veil, Cattle Decapitation, Aborted, Frozen Soul, Tribal Gaze, and have played one-off shows with Captured! By Robots, Biz Markie, Sherwood and Pinch, and Submachine.

Grindmother also performed at So What?! Music Festival 2017 alongside heavyweights such as Every Time I Die, Turnstile, Power Trip, Jesus Piece, After The Burial, Chon, Spite, Fit For An Autopsy and more.

During this period Rayny Forster received equipment endorsements from Jericho Guitars, Orange Amps, and Ernie Ball.

== Tour dates ==
Date	City	Venue
Aug 13 2016	Essen, Germany	Das Supertalent
Jan 26 2017	Pittsburgh, PA	Cattivo
Jan 27 2017	Brooklyn, NY	Silent Barn
Jan 28 2017	Syracuse, NY	The Warehouse
Jan 29 2017	Boston, MA	Hardcore Stadium
Feb 8 2017	Tokyo, Japan	Sound Vision Museum
Feb 24 2017	Trenton, NJ	Championship Bar
Feb 25 2017	Washington, DC	The Pinch
Feb 26 2017	Amityville, NY	Revolution
Feb 28 2017	Buffalo, NY	Mohawk Place
Mar 1 2017	Toronto, ON	Hard Luck
Mar 2 2017	Montreal, QC	Foufounes Électriques
Mar 3 2017	Ottawa, ON	House of Targ
Mar 4 2017	Pittsburgh, PA	The Smiling Moose
Mar 5 2017	Ypsilanti, MI	Crossroads
Mar 6 2017	Chicago, IL	Reggies
Mar 23 2017	Valparaiso, IN	Big Shots
Mar 24 2017	St. Louis, MO	Fubar
Mar 25 2017	Oklahoma City, OK	Thunder Alley
Mar 26 2017	Dallas, TX	So What?! Festival
Mar 28 2017	El Paso, TX	Rockhouse Bar
Mar 29 2017	Mesa, AZ	Club Red
Mar 30 2017	San Diego, CA	Brick By Brick
Mar 31 2017	Pomona, CA	PBW
Apr 1 2017	Las Vegas, NV	Eagle Aerie Hall
Apr 4 2017	Salt Lake City, UT	Metro Music Hall
Apr 5 2017	Thornton, CO	Trailside Saloon
Apr 6 2017	Springfield, MO	Lindberg's
Apr 8 2017	Murfreesboro, TN	Autograph Studio
Apr 9 2017	Cincinnati, OH	Mad Frog
Feb 10 2018	Bradley, IL	Looney Bin
Feb 11 2018	Peoria, IL	Rail II
Feb 12 2018	Kansas City, MO	Riot Room
Feb 13 2018	Omaha, NE	Lookout Lounge
Feb 14 2018	Colorado Springs, CO	Black Sheep
Feb 17 2018	Petaluma, CA	Phoenix Theater
Feb 18 2018	Santa Ana, CA	Malones
Feb 19 2018	Las Vegas, NV	The Church
Feb 20 2018	Mesa, AZ	The Underground
Feb 21 2018	El Paso, TX	Rock House Kitchen
Feb 22 2018	Austin, TX	Dirty Dog Bar
Feb 23 2018	Corpus Christi, TX	Boozerz Rock Bar
Feb 24 2018	Big Spring, TX	Desert Flower Art Bar
Feb 25 2018	Fort Worth, TX	Tomcats West
Feb 27 2018	Memphis, TN	Hi Tone Cafe
Feb 28 2018	Nashville, TN	The East Room
Mar 1 2018	St. Louis, MO	Fubar Lounge
Mar 2 2018	Barrington, IL	Penny Road Pub
Mar 3 2018	Madison, WI	The Annex
Mar 4 2018	Des Moines, IA	Vaudeville Mews
Mar 6 2018	Denver, CO	Roxy Theater
Mar 8 2018	Salt Lake City, UT	The Loading Dock
Mar 9 2018	Boise, ID	The Shredder
Mar 10 2018	Spokane, WA	The Pin
Mar 11 2018	Seattle, WA	Studio Seven
Mar 13 2018	Portland, OR	Analog Theater
Mar 14 2018	Grants Pass, OR	The Sound Lounge
Mar 15 2018	Santa Cruz, CA	Catalyst
Mar 16 2018	Sacramento, CA	Holy Diver
Dec 5 2025	Montreal, QC	Club Soda
Dec 6 2025	Toronto, ON	The Concert Hall

== Media coverage ==
The band received extensive international media coverage following the viral success of their early videos.

Television programs aired clips of their viral videos including The Maury Show, Ridiculousness, Right This Minute, Crazy Talk, Kennedy, Global News (Canada), CNN News (Indonesia), and interview pieces were done by CTV News (Canada), The Morning Show (Australia), and the Laugh Out Loud Series (UK).

Radio interviews were conducted by CBC, NPR, Metal Injection, Leslie Feist, as well as additional coverage by The Strombo Show, Nardwuar The Human Serviette, and Alan Cross. Audio clips taken from some of the radio coverage can be heard on the Grindmother song "Media Spin".

The band has also been featured in print interviews by Exclaim, Huffington Post, OC Weekly, Vice, Vice Japan, Mass Movement, Toronto Star and Windsor Star.

Over 150 additional articles have been published by notable publications including New York Post, Daily Mail, Metro, Refinery29, Ultimate Guitar, Metal Hammer, Nerdist, Consequence, Loudwire, and Metal Injection.

== Dementia diagnosis and farewell shows (2025) ==
In July 2025 the band announced that Grindmother had been diagnosed with advanced dementia and would perform two final concerts.

Broken Neck Radio reported:

Following a 7-year hiatus, Grindmother will perform two final shows this winter — a celebratory and emotional farewell to one of the most unlikely and inspiring forces in extreme music.

The Toronto Star described the situation starkly:

A tragic fact of life: Grindmother’s lead singer… has advanced dementia.

The announcement coincided with another major event in heavy metal. News of the farewell shows appeared the same day Ozzy Osbourne died, shortly after Black Sabbath’s final concert.

Forster later described the coincidence as bittersweet, noting that Ozzy Osbourne had appeared symbolically at both the beginning and end of Grindmother’s journey.

=== Messages of Support ===
Following the announcement, numerous musicians recorded video tributes wishing Grindmother well.

Participants included:

- Henry Rollins (Black Flag, Rollins Band)
- Ben Weinman (Dillinger Escape Plan)
- Gary Holt (Slayer, Exodus)
- Shane Embury (Napalm Death)
- Fernanda Lira (Crypta)
- Devin Swank (Sanguisugabogg)
- Peaches
- Nardwuar

=== Rehearsal Video Goes Viral ===
A video of Grindmother rehearsing for the shows received over one million views within its first day online and was aired by CTV News.

=== Final performances ===
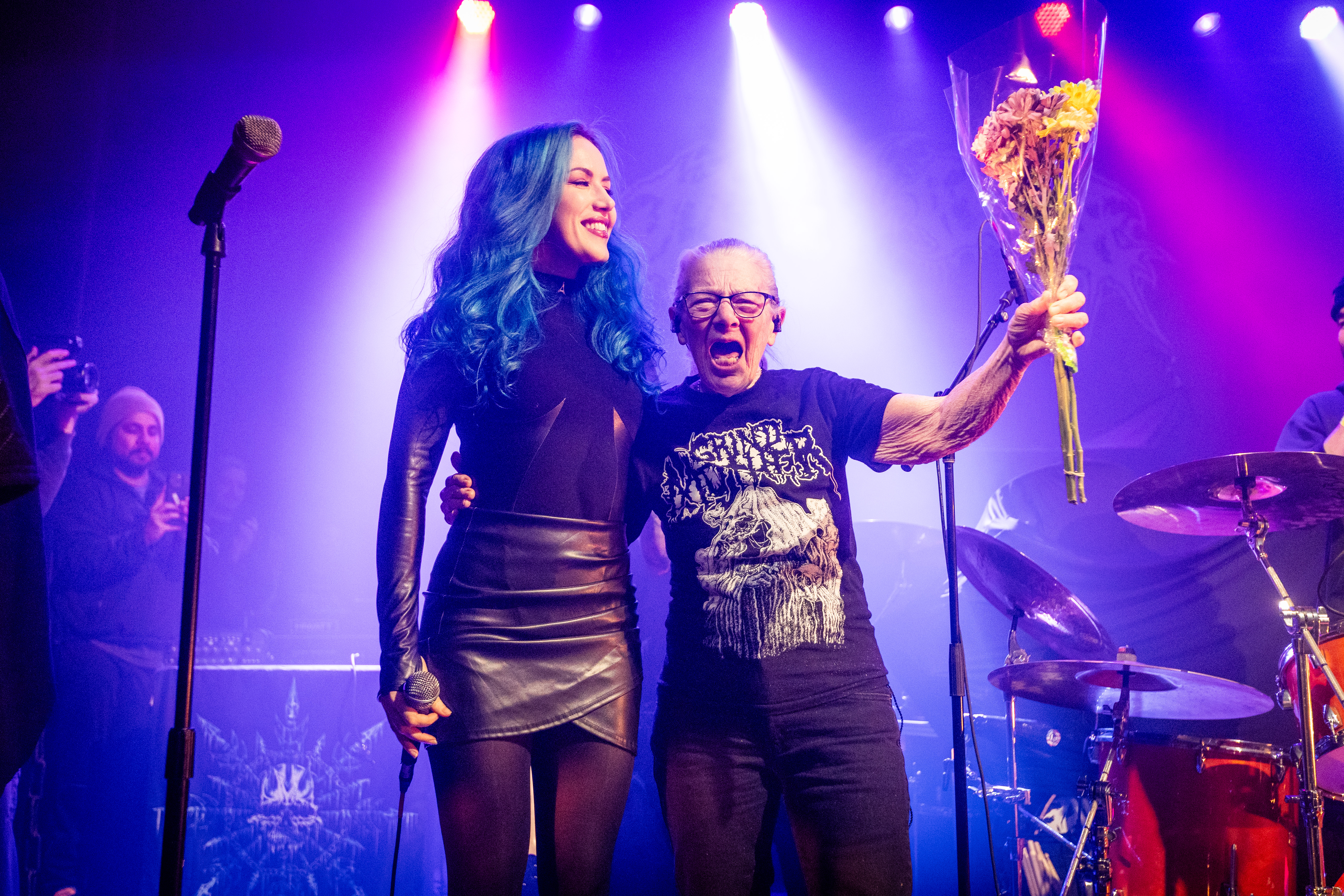
Grindmother (right) and Alissa White-Gluz (left) at Club Soda in Montreal on Dec 5, 2025. Photo by Jesse Di Meo.

The band performed its final concerts in Montreal and Toronto in December 2025 as part of the “No Fear For Tomorrow Tour,” opening for Cattle Decapitation, Aborted, Frozen Soul, and Tribal Gaze.

Both shows were sold out, with approximately:

- 1,400 attendees in Montreal
- 1,200 attendees in Toronto.

The band consisted of guest musicians Topon Das and Mathieu Vilandré of Fuck the Facts, along with Rayny Forster on bass.

Because of Grindmother’s health, guest vocalists performed most of the set. The singers were:

- Chelsea Marrow (Visitant)
- Liz Selfish (Brat)
- Alissa White-Gluz (Blue Medusa, formerly of Arch Enemy)

Grindmother appeared for the final song of each night, delivering an emotional farewell performance.

At the end of the Montreal show, White-Gluz presented her with flowers and the band took a bow as the crowd chanted “Grindmother.”

One review summarized the moment as Grindmother ending her touring career “loud, chaotic, and surrounded by friends.”

Another reviewer described the performance as a “historic moment” of “brutality and femininity.”

Two months later, in February 2026, Grindmother moved into a long-term care facility.

== Legacy and future ==
Despite the end of live performances, work on previously unfinished Grindmother recordings continues. Rayny Forster has stated that additional material recorded during the band’s active years is currently being prepared for future release.

== Discography ==
=== Studio albums ===
- Age of Destruction (2016)

=== Singles ===
- Any Cost (2015)
- Slave New World (Sepultura Cover, 2016)
- Forest (System of a Down cover, 2021)
