= As the Stages Burn! =

Video by Arch Enemy
- Released: 31 March 2017
- Recorded: 6 August 2016
- Venue: Wacken Open Air (Schleswig-Holstein, Germany)
- Genre: Melodic death metal
- Length: 137:05
- Label: Century Media
- Producer: Andy Sneap

Arch Enemy chronology
Tyrants of the Rising Sun (2008)	As the Stages Burn! (2017)

As the Stages Burn! is a DVD and CD by Swedish melodic death metal band Arch Enemy. The band recorded their live performance at Wacken Open Air in Schleswig-Holstein, Germany, on 6 August 2016, amid the tour in support of the band's ninth album War Eternal.

The running time of the concert is 1 hour and 10 minutes. The DVD also contains a short behind-the-scenes documentary about the band's experience at Wacken, some bonus tracks taken from the band's DVD War Eternal Tour: Tokyo Sacrifice and the six official music videos from War Eternal.

== Track listing ==
DVD edition
No.	Title	Lyrics	Music	Length
1.	"Khaos Overture" (live at Wacken 2016)	Angela Gossow	Michael Amott; Christopher Amott; Sharlee D'Angelo; Daniel Erlandsson	1:36
2.	"Yesterday Is Dead and Gone" (live at Wacken 2016)	Gossow	M. Amott; C. Amott; D'Angelo; Erlandsson	4:48
3.	"War Eternal" (live at Wacken 2016)	M. Amott	M. Amott; Nick Cordle	4:56
4.	"Ravenous" (live at Wacken 2016)	Gossow; M. Amott	M. Amott; C. Amott	4:20
5.	"Stolen Life" (live at Wacken 2016)	M. Amott	M. Amott	3:05
6.	"My Apocalypse" (live at Wacken 2016)	Gossow	M. Amott; C. Amott; Erlandsson	5:50
7.	"You Will Know My Name" (live at Wacken 2016)	M. Amott	M. Amott; Cordle	4:25
8.	"Bloodstained Cross" (live at Wacken 2016)	Gossow	M. Amott; C. Amott; D'Angelo; Erlandsson	5:22
9.	"Under Black Flags We March" (live at Wacken 2016)	Gossow	M. Amott; C. Amott; D'Angelo; Erlandsson	5:15
10.	"As the Pages Burn" (live at Wacken 2016)	Alissa White-Gluz	M. Amott	4:15
11.	"Dead Eyes See No Future" (live at Wacken 2016)	Gossow; M. Amott	M. Amott; C. Amott	4:47
12.	"Avalanche" (live at Wacken 2016)	White-Gluz	M. Amott; Cordle; Erlandsson	4:56
13.	"No Gods, No Masters" (live at Wacken 2016)	Gossow	M. Amott; C. Amott; D'Angelo; Erlandsson	4:35
14.	"We Will Rise" (live at Wacken 2016)	M. Amott	M. Amott; C. Amott	4:55
15.	"Nemesis" (live at Wacken 2016)	Gossow	M. Amott; C. Amott; Erlandsson	4:38
16.	"Fields of Desolation" (live at Wacken 2016)	Instrumental	M. Amott; C. Amott	2:55
17.	"Outro" (live at Wacken 2016)	Instrumental	M. Amott; C. Amott	2:02
18.	"Wacken 2016: Behind the Scenes"			6:47
19.	"Tempore Nihil Sanat" (live in Tokyo 2015)	M. Amott	M. Amott	1:02
20.	"Never Forgive, Never Forget" (live in Tokyo 2015)	M. Amott	M. Amott; Cordle	3:48
21.	"Bury Me an Angel" (live in Tokyo 2015)	M. Amott	M. Amott	4:42
22.	"Taking Back My Soul" (live in Tokyo 2015)	Gossow; M. Amott	M. Amott; C. Amott; Erlandsson	4:59
23.	"Burning Angel" (live in Tokyo 2015)	M. Amott	M. Amott; C. Amott	4:25
24.	"The Day You Died" (live in Tokyo 2015)	Gossow; M. Amott	M. Amott; Erlandsson	4:54
25.	"No More Regrets" (live in Tokyo 2015)	White-Gluz	M. Amott; Cordle	4:33
26.	"Silverwing" (live in Tokyo 2015)	M. Amott	M. Amott; C. Amott	5:31
27.	"War Eternal" (music video)	M. Amott	M. Amott; Cordle	4:17
28.	"You Will Know My Name" (music video)	M. Amott	M. Amott; Cordle	4:44
29.	"No More Regrets" (music video)	White-Gluz	M. Amott; Cordle	4:10
30.	"Stolen Life" (2015 version)	M. Amott	M. Amott	2:58
31.	"Stolen Life" (2016 version)	M. Amott	M. Amott	2:58
32.	"Time Is Black" (music video)	White-Gluz	M. Amott; Erlandsson	4:37

CD edition
No.	Title	Lyrics	Music	Length
1.	"Khaos Overture" (Live at Wacken 2016)	Angela Gossow	Michael Amott; Christopher Amott; Sharlee D'Angelo; Daniel Erlandsson	1:36
2.	"Yesterday Is Dead and Gone" (Live at Wacken 2016)	Gossow	M. Amott; C. Amott; D'Angelo; Erlandsson	4:48
3.	"War Eternal" (Live at Wacken 2016)	M. Amott	M. Amott; Nick Cordle	4:56
4.	"Ravenous" (Live at Wacken 2016)	Gossow; M. Amott	M. Amott; C. Amott	4:20
5.	"Stolen Life" (Live at Wacken 2016)	M. Amott	M. Amott	3:05
6.	"My Apocalypse" (Live at Wacken 2016)	Gossow	M. Amott; C. Amott; Erlandsson	5:50
7.	"You Will Know My Name" (Live at Wacken 2016)	M. Amott	M. Amott; Cordle	4:25
8.	"Bloodstained Cross" (Live at Wacken 2016)	Gossow	M. Amott; C. Amott; D'Angelo; Erlandsson	5:22
9.	"Under Black Flags We March" (Live at Wacken 2016)	Gossow	M. Amott; C. Amott; D'Angelo; Erlandsson	5:15
10.	"As the Pages Burn" (Live at Wacken 2016)	Alissa White-Gluz	M. Amott	4:15
11.	"Dead Eyes See No Future" (Live at Wacken 2016)	Gossow; M. Amott	M. Amott; C. Amott	4:47
12.	"Avalanche" (Live at Wacken 2016)	White-Gluz	M. Amott; Cordle; Erlandsson	4:56
13.	"No Gods, No Masters" (Live at Wacken 2016)	Gossow	M. Amott; C. Amott; D'Angelo; Erlandsson	4:35
14.	"We Will Rise" (Live at Wacken 2016)	M. Amott	M. Amott; C. Amott	4:55
15.	"Nemesis" (Live at Wacken 2016)	Gossow	M. Amott; C. Amott; Erlandsson	4:38
16.	"Fields of Desolation" (Live at Wacken 2016)	Instrumental	M. Amott; C. Amott	2:55

== Charts ==
Chart performance for As the Stages Burn!
Chart (2017)	Peak position
Austrian Albums (Ö3 Austria)	36
Belgian Albums (Ultratop Flanders)	61
Belgian Albums (Ultratop Wallonia)	46
Dutch Albums (Album Top 100)	149
Finnish Albums (Suomen virallinen lista)	48
French Albums (SNEP)	129
German Albums (Offizielle Top 100)	9
Swiss Albums (Schweizer Hitparade)	45
