= Rising from the North =

2024 concert tour by Arch Enemy and In Flames

- Tour by Arch Enemy and In Flames
- Associated album: Deceivers; Blood Dynasty; Foregone
- Start date: October 3, 2024
- End date: November 5, 2024
- No. of shows: 25
Arch Enemy tour chronology
Deceivers Asia Tour (2024)	Rising from the North (2024)	Largo Camino Al Inframundo... (2024)
In Flames tour chronology
North American Tour (2024)	Rising from the North (2024)	North American Tour (2025)

Rising from the North (also referred to as Rising from the North Tour) was a concert tour co-headlined by Swedish melodic death metal bands Arch Enemy and In Flames, with special guest Soilwork. The tour was announced on November 20, 2023 and general ticket sales for the shows began four days later. The first show of the tour was October 3, 2024 at O2 Academy Glasgow in Scotland, and the closing night of the tour was November 5, 2024 at Helsinki Ice Hall in Finland.

== Background ==
As three of the most popular and influential Swedish melodic death metal bands, Arch Enemy, In Flames and Soilwork have crossed paths many times throughout their careers, and Soilwork even have a song featuring Arch Enemy frontwoman Alissa White-Gluz ("Stålfågel", from the deluxe edition of 2019's Verkligheten). The bands have toured with each other in the past, but 'Rising from the North' is the first time all three bands embark on an extensive tour together.

With the tour announcement, In Flames frontman Anders Fridén commented, "Couldn't be more excited to announce this tour. It’s been a long time coming and we are finally back together again onstage with our friends in Arch Enemy and Soilwork. We plan to bring you an unforgettable night of melody and mayhem! This is some of Sweden’s finest – a tour you simply should not miss!"

Arch Enemy guitarist and composer Michael Amott commented, "Check this Swedish metal extravaganza across Europe in 2024! We go way back with In Flames and Soilwork to the very early days of Arch Enemy and honestly couldn't be happier to announce this run with our Swedish comrades – this tour is going to be a special one!"

== Development ==
Multiple shows of the tour sold out within weeks/months of announcement, leading the bands to relocate some shows to a larger venue. The October 8 show in Paris was originally planned to take place at L'Olympia, but on January 25, 2024 was relocated to Le Zénith. The October 27 show in Berlin was originally planned to take place at Columbiahalle, but on June 21, 2024 was relocated to Velodrom.

Due to high demand, Arch Enemy and In Flames offered VIP upgrades (purchasable via Metaltix) for the tour, allowing fans access to perks such as meeting the bands, receiving exclusive merchandise and being granted early entry to the venues. In Flames' VIP upgrades were released alongside the general ticket sale on November 24, 2023, and Arch Enemy's were made available on November 29, 2023.

By the time the tour took place, the majority of the shows were either sold out or had only a small amount of tickets remaining. Lots of VIP packages sold, and Arch Enemy documented this by creating brief documentaries of each show uploaded as Instagram Reels - the videos were taken by photographer Jens De Vos, who accompanied the band on the tour.

== Critical reception ==
The tour received largely positive reviews from critics. Reviewers praised the vocal abilities and stage presence of White-Gluz, Fridén and Strid, as well as the visual elements such as lighting and pyrotechnics.

After attending the London show on October 6, Sheri Bicheno (for Metal Planet Music) noted the energy and atmosphere that openers Soilwork created with their audience, writing "[Soilwork] are genuine about their deliverance and the vibe that they create and by the measure of the screams back to the stage, the feeling amongst their fans is very much reciprocated".

Reporters noticed how energised the crowds became during the shows - Cris Watkins (for Punk in Focus) wrote, "The crowd surfers pour into the pit, and the Apollo staff have their hands full, but the energy is infectious. The twin guitar attack from Björn Gelotte and Chris Broderick rips through the venue, pushing the crowd to their limits. They wrap their set with a triple-hit of “The Mirrors [sic] Truth”, “I Am Above”, and finally “My Sweet Shadow” a fitting climax to a monumental performance".

Critics reported enjoying the performances of new (then-unreleased) tracks from Arch Enemy's upcoming album Blood Dynasty, and Buffy (for Folk N Rock) wrote, "What made their set even more special was the live debut of “Liars & Thieves,” a track from their newly announced album, Blood Dynasty. Experiencing new material live, especially when it’s delivered with such raw power, felt like an exclusive gift to everyone in attendance".

== Tour dates ==
List of concerts, showing date, city, country and venue
Date	City	Country	Venue
October 3, 2024	Glasgow	Scotland	O2 Academy Glasgow
October 4, 2024	Manchester	England	Manchester Academy
October 5, 2024	Birmingham	England	O2 Academy Birmingham
October 6, 2024	London	England	Eventim Apollo Hammersmith
October 8, 2024	Paris	France	Zénith Paris
October 9, 2024	Esch-sur-Alzette	Luxembourg	Rockhal
October 11, 2024	Hamburg	Germany	Sporthalle
October 12, 2024	Düsseldorf	Germany	Mitsubishi Electric Halle
October 13, 2024	Den Bosch	Netherlands	Mainstage
October 15, 2024	Zurich	Switzerland	The Hall
October 16, 2024	Milan	Italy	Alcatraz
October 18, 2024	Stuttgart	Germany	Hanns-Martin-Schleyer-Halle
October 19, 2024	Frankfurt	Germany	Jahrhunderthalle
October 20, 2024	Munich	Germany	Zenith
October 22, 2024	Vienna	Austria	Gasometer
October 23, 2024	Budapest	Hungary	Barba Negra
October 25, 2024	Prague	Czech Republic	Sportovní hala Fortuna
October 26, 2024	Dresden	Germany	Messe
October 27, 2024	Berlin	Germany	Velodrom
October 29, 2024	Oslo	Norway	Spektrum
October 31, 2024^{[A]}	Malmö	Sweden	Malmö Arena
November 1, 2024^{[A]}	Gothenburg	Sweden	Scandinavium
November 2, 2024^{[A]}	Stockholm	Sweden	Hovet
November 3, 2024^{[A]}	Sundsvall	Sweden	Nordichallen
November 5, 2024	Helsinki	Finland	Ice Hall

- A These shows were headlined by In Flames – Arch Enemy joined Soilwork as the special guests.

== Personnel ==
=== Arch Enemy ===
- Alissa White-Gluz – lead vocals
- Michael Amott – guitar, backing vocals
- Joey Concepcion – guitar
- Sharlee D'Angelo – bass
- Daniel Erlandsson – drums

=== In Flames ===
- Anders Fridén – lead vocals
- Björn Gelotte – lead guitar
- Chris Broderick – rhythm guitar
- Liam Wilson – bass, backing vocals
- Tanner Wayne – drums
- Niels Nielsen – keyboards

=== Soilwork ===
- Björn "Speed" Strid – lead vocals
- Sylvain Coudret – guitars
- Simon Johansson – guitars
- Rasmus Ehrnborn – bass
- Bastian Thusgaard – drums
- Sven Karlsson – keyboards

=== Additional personnel ===
- François Ouellet – tour manager (Arch Enemy)
- Jens De Vos – photography (Arch Enemy)
- Oscar Dziedziela – photography (In Flames)
- Faye S. – photography (Soilwork)
- Kusch Kuschnerus – drum technician (Arch Enemy)
- Charles Degolla – drum technician (Soilwork)
- Andreas Baglien – sound technician (Soilwork)
- Greg Winn – guitar technician (In Flames)
- Martin Müller – light technician (Arch Enemy)
