= Blue Medusa =

Canadian/American metal band

- Genres: Metalcore; melodic death metal; extreme metal
- Years active: 2026–present
- Members: Alissa White-Gluz; Alyssa Day; Dani Sophia; Alicia Vigil; Delaney Jaster
- Website: bluemedusa.com

Blue Medusa is a Canadian/American heavy metal band formed by Canadian vocalist Alissa White-Gluz following her exit from the Swedish melodic death metal band Arch Enemy in 2025.

When constructing a lineup for the band, White-Gluz recruited guitarists Alyssa Day and Dani Sophia as permanent band members, with no permanent bassist or drummer. Originally, Blue Medusa's 2026 live performances at the festivals Louder Than Life and Aftershock, "live" members would perform bass and drums by White-Gluz's DragonForce bandmate Alicia Vigil and Delaney Jaster, respectively. As of September 2026, the band presented as a five-piece, with Vigil and Jaster as official members.

== History ==
On 15 February 2026, White-Gluz announced via her social media platforms that she had formed a then-unnamed band alongside Day and Sophia, and that music was to be released soon.

The band's name was announced publicly on 8 March 2026, coinciding with International Women's Day; White-Gluz stated in a press release that she chose to announce the band on this day to stress the importance of empowering women in the heavy music scene.

The band's debut single, "Checkmate" was released on 20 March 2026, with an accompanying video directed by Vicente Cordero (of Industrialism Films) and Alissa White-Gluz.

The second Blue Medusa single, titled "Flying Monkey", was released on 15 May 2026, alongside a music video, once again directed by Cordero and White-Gluz.

On 1 September 2026, Blue Medusa announced that their third single "Crocodile" would be released on 4 September 2026. A music video (once again directed by White-Gluz and Cordero) was premiered later that day. The video features a cameo by Beatriz Mariano (of the Portuguese band Okkultist), who also lent backing vocals to the track.

Following the release of the "Crocodile" music video, Blue Medusa made a surprise appearance at the 'Corrupted Blood' Club Show at Huxleys Neue Welt in Berlin, Germany; this show marked the band's first ever public performance and featured all songs the band has yet released, in addition to a rendition of "The Wolf You Feed", originally released by Nita Strauss on her album The Call of the Void and featuring Alissa White-Gluz.

== Musical style ==
Blue Medusa's musical style has been classified as extreme metal, with a heavy focus on "ferocity, theatrical energy and vocal firepower", as described by MetalTalk.

In an article regarding the debut single "Checkmate", Sonic Perspectives noted that the track demonstrates a "dynamic fusion of melody, heaviness, and razor-sharp precision".

In an interview with Louder Sound, White-Gluz described Blue Medusa's sound as rooted in "high-energy, fast heavy music".

== Band members ==
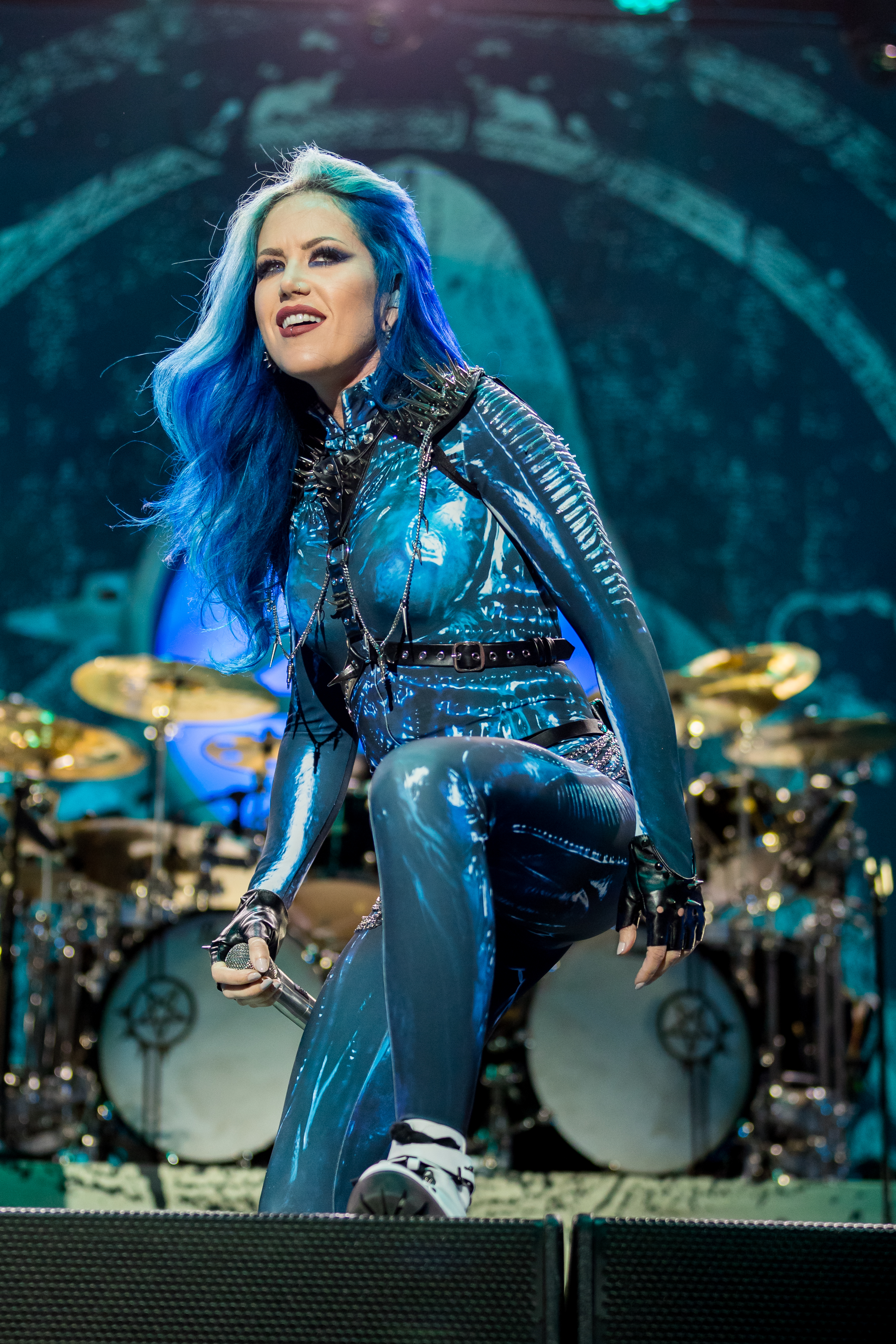
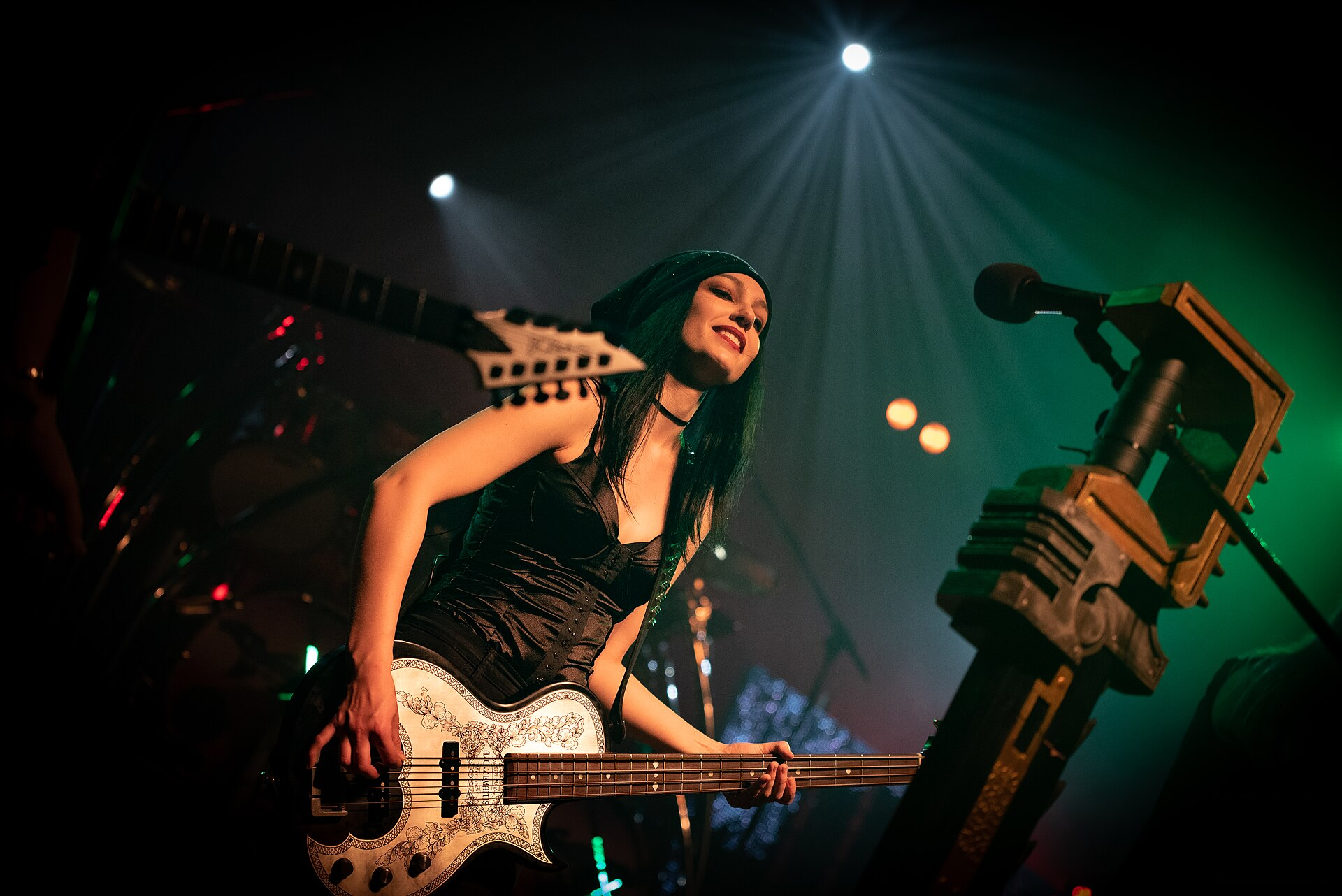
Two of the members of Blue Medusa; Alissa White-Gluz (left) and Alicia Vigil (right)

=== Current ===
- Alissa White-Gluz – lead vocals
- Alyssa Day – guitars
- Dani Sophia – guitars
- Alicia Vigil – bass
- Delaney Jaster – drums

== Discography ==
=== Singles ===
- "Checkmate" (2026)
- "Flying Monkey" (2026)
- "Crocodile" (2026)
