= Will to Power (Arch Enemy album) =

Studio album by Arch Enemy
- Released: 8 September 2017
- Recorded: 2016–2017
- Studio: Studio Mega (Varberg, Sweden); Sweetspot Satellite (Halmstad, Sweden); Sweetspot (Harplinge, Sweden); Riksmixingsverket (Stockholm, Sweden)
- Genre: Melodic death metal
- Length: 50:32
- Label: Century Media
- Producer: Michael Amott; Daniel Erlandsson

Arch Enemy chronology
| War Eternal (2014) | Will to Power (2017) | Deceivers (2022) |

Singles from Will to Power
- 1. "The World Is Yours" Released: 14 July 2017; 2. "The Eagle Flies Alone" Released: 25 August 2017; 3. "The Race" Released: 17 October 2017; 4. "Reason to Believe" Released: 7 December 2018; 5. "My Shadow and I" Released: 18 March 2022

Will to Power is the tenth studio album by Swedish melodic death metal band Arch Enemy, released on 8 September 2017 via Century Media Records. This is the first album to feature guitarist Jeff Loomis who joined the band in November 2014. It is also the first Arch Enemy album to feature a song with clean singing as lead vocals; the song, "Reason to Believe", is referred to as "their first ever, largely clean-sung power ballad."

== Reception ==
Professional ratings
Review scores
| Source | Rating |
|---|---|
| Metal Hammer | 8/10 |
| Metal Injection | 8.5/10 |
| MetalSucks | 2.5/5 stars |
| Terrorizer | 6/10 |

Ross Baker of Terrorizer gave the album a moderate rating, and wrote, "'Will To Power' doesn't see a dramatic stylistic shift from melodic death metal, but Michael Amott and company flex their muscles and experiment a bit on this tenth release."

== Accolades ==
Metal Hammer magazine ranked Will to Power at No. 40 on its list of 100 Best Albums of 2017.

At the 2017 Burrn! magazine awards, the album won Best Album and Best Artwork, and the song "The World is Yours" won Best Tune.

== Track listing ==
| No. | Title | Lyrics | Music | Length |
|---|---|---|---|---|
| 1. | "Set Flame to the Night" | instrumental | Michael Amott; Daniel Erlandsson | 1:18 |
| 2. | "The Race" | Alissa White-Gluz | Amott; Erlandsson | 3:15 |
| 3. | "Blood in the Water" | Amott | Amott; Erlandsson | 3:55 |
| 4. | "The World Is Yours" | Amott | Amott; Erlandsson | 4:53 |
| 5. | "The Eagle Flies Alone (Note: Some versions of the album use the edited version of this song, which cuts out part of the intro, making it a length of 5:00.)" | Amott | Amott | 5:15 |
| 6. | "Reason to Believe" | Amott | Amott; Christopher Amott | 4:47 |
| 7. | "Murder Scene" | White-Gluz | Amott; Erlandsson | 3:50 |
| 8. | "First Day in Hell" | White-Gluz | Amott | 4:48 |
| 9. | "Saturnine" | instrumental | Erlandsson | 1:09 |
| 10. | "Dreams of Retribution" | Amott | Amott; C. Amott; Erlandsson | 6:40 |
| 11. | "My Shadow and I" | White-Gluz | Amott | 4:05 |
| 12. | "A Fight I Must Win" | Amott; White-Gluz | Amott; Erlandsson | 6:37 |
| Total length: | | | | 50:32 |

Limited edition digipak
| No. | Title | Writer(s) | Length |
|---|---|---|---|
| 13. | "City Baby Attacked by Rats" (Charged GBH cover) | Colin Abrahall; Ross Lomas; Colin Blyth; Andrew Williams | 2:48 |
| Total length: | | | 53:20 |

Råpunk (Deluxe box set vinyl EP)
| No. | Title | Writer(s) | Length |
|---|---|---|---|
| 1. | "Warsystem" (The Shitlickers cover) | Lars Andrén | 0:54 |
| 2. | "Armed Revolution" (The Shitlickers cover) | Andrén | 0:51 |
| 3. | "Spräckta snutskallar" (The Shitlickers cover) | Andrén | 0:51 |
| 4. | "The Leader (Of the Fuckin' Assholes)" (The Shitlickers cover) | Andrén | 1:02 |
| 5. | "Nitad" (Moderat Likvidation cover) | Cliff Lundberg | 1:06 |
| 6. | "When the Innocent Die" (Anti Cimex cover) | Tomas Jonsson; Charlie Claeson; Joakim Pettersson; Mats Skånberg | 1:57 |
| 7. | "City Baby Attacked by Rats" (Charged GBH cover) | Colin Abrahall; Ross Lomas; Colin Blyth; Andrew Williams | 2:48 |
| Total length: | | | 9:29 |

Japanese edition
| No. | Title | Lyrics | Music | Length |
|---|---|---|---|---|
| 13. | "Back to Back" (Pretty Maids cover) | Ronnie Atkins | Ken Hammer; Alan Owen | 3:22 |
| 14. | "City Baby Attacked by Rats" (Charged GBH cover) | Colin Abrahall | Ross Lomas; Colin Blyth; Andrew Williams | 2:48 |
| Total length: | | | | 56:42 |

== Personnel ==
=== Arch Enemy ===
- Alissa White-Gluz – vocals, lyrics handwriting
- Michael Amott – lead & rhythm guitars, production
- Jeff Loomis – lead guitar
- Sharlee D'Angelo – bass
- Daniel Erlandsson – drums, keyboards, programming, production, guitar and bass engineering

=== Additional musicians ===
- Ulf Janson – strings arrangement (12), conducting
- Henrik Janson – strings arrangement (12), conducting
- Stockholm Session Strings – strings performance
  - Ulf Forsberg, Christian Bergqvist, Per Öman, Ulrika Jansson, Bo Söderström, Torbjörn Bernhardsson – violin
  - Tony Bauer, Riikka Repo – viola
  - Johanna Sjunnesson – cello
- Jens Johansson – keyboards (4, 9, 10)
- Christopher Amott – keyboards and clean guitars (6)

=== Technical personnel ===
- Alex Reisfar – front cover artwork
- Costin Chioreanu – booklet artwork, booklet layout
- Katja Kuhl – photography
- Tom Couture – photography
- Jens Bogren – mixing, mastering
- Johan Örnborg – drum engineering
- Tobias Strandvik – drum tech
- Rickard Bengtsson – lead guitar engineering
- Staffan Karlsson – vocal engineering and production
- Linn Fijal – string engineering

== Charts ==
| Chart (2017) | Peak position |
|---|---|
| Australian Albums (ARIA) | 26 |
| Austrian Albums (Ö3 Austria) | 6 |
| Belgian Albums (Ultratop Flanders) | 11 |
| Belgian Albums (Ultratop Wallonia) | 15 |
| Canadian Albums (Billboard) | 80 |
| Czech Albums (ČNS IFPI) | 5 |
| Dutch Albums (Album Top 100) | 11 |
| Finnish Albums (Suomen virallinen lista) | 2 |
| French Albums (SNEP) | 22 |
| German Albums (Offizielle Top 100) | 3 |
| Hungarian Albums (MAHASZ) | 13 |
| New Zealand Heatseekers Albums (RMNZ) | 10 |
| Scottish Albums (OCC) | 24 |
| Spanish Albums (PROMUSICAE) | 17 |
| Swedish Albums (Sverigetopplistan) | 11 |
| Swiss Albums (Schweizer Hitparade) | 5 |
| UK Albums (OCC) | 37 |
| UK Rock & Metal Albums (OCC) | 3 |
| US Billboard 200 | 90 |
| US Top Hard Rock Albums (Billboard) | 3 |
| US Top Rock Albums (Billboard) | 15 |
