= Blood Dynasty =

Studio album by Arch Enemy
- Released: 28 March 2025
- Recorded: 2024
- Studio: Fascination Street Studios (Örebro, Sweden); Sonic Boom Studios (Berlin, Germany)
- Genre: Melodic death metal
- Length: 42:41
- Label: Century Media
- Producer: Jens Bogren

Arch Enemy chronology
Deceivers (2022)	Blood Dynasty (2025)

Singles from Blood Dynasty
- 1. "Dream Stealer" Released: 31 July 2024; 2. "Liars & Thieves" Released: 17 October 2024; 3. "Blood Dynasty" Released: 4 December 2024; 4. "Paper Tiger" Released: 6 February 2025; 5. "A Million Suns" Released: 2 April 2025; 6. "Illuminate the Path" Released: 20 August 2025; 7. "Break the Spell" Released: 17 September 2025; 8. "March of the Miscreants" Released: 5 November 2025

Blood Dynasty is the twelfth studio album by Swedish melodic death metal band Arch Enemy. The album was released on 28 March 2025. It is Arch Enemy's first studio album to feature guitarist Joey Concepcion, following the departure of Jeff Loomis from the band in 2023, although Loomis is featured on the bonus tracks "Break the Spell" and "Moths". It is also the final album to feature vocalist Alissa White-Gluz, who departed the band on November 23, 2025.

== Promotion ==
On 31 July 2024, Arch Enemy surprise-released their standalone single "Dream Stealer" and premiered its accompanying music video at 6 p.m. CET.

The band debuted the then-unreleased track "Liars & Thieves" live on 3 October 2024, during the opening concert of the Rising from the North tour, which featured In Flames as co-headliners and Soilwork as special guests. The following day, Arch Enemy officially announced their upcoming album Blood Dynasty, scheduled for release on 28 March 2025.

On 17 October 2024, the band released "Liars & Thieves" as the album's second single. A music video composed of live footage from the first two weeks of the Rising from the North tour accompanied the release.

To support the new album, Arch Enemy launched the Largo Camino Al Inframundo... tour in Mexico on 12 November 2024. Shortly thereafter, on 25 November, the band announced the European Blood Dynasty tour, a headlining run with support from Amorphis, Eluveitie, and Gatecreeper.

On 27 November 2024, Arch Enemy revealed that the album's title track would be released as the third single. It was officially released on 4 December 2024, with its music video premiering the same day on the band's official YouTube channel at 6 p.m. CET.

Further expanding their tour plans, the band announced the North American Blood Dynasty tour on 18 December 2024. This headlining tour, featuring support from Fit for an Autopsy, Baest, and Thrown into Exile, was the band's first tour to take place after the release of Blood Dynasty.

On 3 February 2025, it was confirmed that the fourth single, "Paper Tiger", would be released on 6 February, accompanied by a new music video.

Just days after the album's release, the band announced on 31 March 2025 via social media a fifth music video, for the track "A Million Suns", which premiered on 2 April 2025.

Following some teasers shared via the band's social media platforms, the sixth music video - for the song "Illuminate the Path" - premiered on 20 August 2025, directed by long-time collaborator Patric Ullaeus.

On 15 September 2025, less than one month since the previous single, the band announced that the bonus track "Break the Spell" (which was, at the time, exclusive to physical copies of the album) would be released as a single and video two days later. Alongside the release of the track on streaming platforms, the band announced a digital-exclusive re-release of Blood Dynasty, set to feature not only "Break the Spell" and "Moths", but also a brand new track, titled "Lachrymatory". The re-release of Blood Dynasty is scheduled for 10 October 2025, coinciding with the beginning of the band's European Blood Dynasty 2025 Tour; the album also has an alternate artwork than the original release.

== Background ==
The cover artwork of Blood Dynasty was created by artist Alex Reisfar, who previously created the artworks for Arch Enemy's albums Will to Power (2017) and Deceivers (2022).

Upon announcing the album, founding member and guitarist Michael Amott stated that Blood Dynasty will surpass fans' expectations for an Arch Enemy album, saying, "This new album pushes the boundaries of what we've done before — it's everything you've come to expect from this band, and then some! We can't wait for you to hear it and feel the energy we've poured into every track. Welcome to the 'Blood Dynasty'!"

Track 9 of Blood Dynasty is a cover of the song "Vivre Libre" by the French heavy metal band Blaspheme. This is the first time in their career that Arch Enemy have released a cover as a track on the standard edition of an album rather than on the deluxe edition. As there is a cover on the main track listing, two of the bonus tracks ("Break the Spell" and "Moths") are original songs written by Arch Enemy, and the third bonus track in the Japanese edition ("Evil Dead") is a Death cover.

== Release formats ==
Blood Dynasty has been available for pre-order since the album announcement in various CD and vinyl formats, including standard editions and multiple limited edition variants with exclusive colours and packaging. Preorder bundles including the album and merchandise such as t-shirts are also available through the Arch Enemy store and Rebellion Republic.

== Track listing ==
All music is composed by Michael Amott and Daniel Erlandsson except where noted.

No.	Title	Lyrics	Music	Length
1.	"Dream Stealer"	Amott		4:30
2.	"Illuminate the Path"	Amott, Alissa White-Gluz		4:48
3.	"March of the Miscreants"	Amott		4:49
4.	"A Million Suns"	Amott	Amott	3:45
5.	"Don't Look Down"	White-Gluz		4:07
6.	"Presage"	Instrumental	Erlandsson	0:47
7.	"Blood Dynasty"	Amott		3:51
8.	"Paper Tiger"	White-Gluz		3:56
9.	"Vivre Libre" (Blaspheme cover)	Marc Fery	Pierre Holzhaeuser	4:07
10.	"The Pendulum"	Amott		3:42
11.	"Liars & Thieves"	White-Gluz		4:20
Total length:				42:41

Bonus tracks
No.	Title	Lyrics	Music	Length
12.	"Break the Spell"	Amott		4:28
13.	"Moths"	White-Gluz	Amott	4:01
Total length:				51:10

Japan-exclusive bonus track
No.	Title	Length
14.	"Evil Dead" (Death cover)	3:05
Total length:		54:15

Digital-exclusive bonus track
No.	Title	Length
14.	"Lachrymatory"	3:50
Total length:		55:00

== Personnel ==
=== Arch Enemy ===
- Alissa White-Gluz – vocals
- Michael Amott – guitars
- Joey Concepcion – guitars
- Sharlee D'Angelo – bass
- Daniel Erlandsson – drums, keyboards, sound effects

=== Additional personnel ===
- Jens Bogren – production, engineering, mixing, mastering
- Michael Amott – co-production
- Daniel Erlandsson – co-production
- Jacob Hansen – production, mixing, mastering ("Break the Spell", "Moths")
- Tony Lindgren – mastering
- Johan Martin – mixing assistance
- Jeff Loomis – guitars ("Break the Spell", "Moths")
- Raphael Liebermann – cello ("Presage")
- Alexander Khromov – engineering ("Presage")
- Francesco Ferrini – keys, orchestrations
- Alexander Backlund – drum tech, tuning
- S. C. Kuschnerus – drum tech, tuning
- Alex Reisfar – cover art
- CVSPE (André Trindade) – artwork ("Dream Stealer", "Liars & Thieves", "Blood Dynasty", "Paper Tiger" singles)
- Patric Ullaeus – photography, music video direction ("Dream Stealer")
- Jens De Vos – music video direction ("Liars & Thieves")
- Mirko Witzki – music video direction ("Blood Dynasty", "A Million Suns")
- Moritz "Mumpi" Künster – music video direction ("Paper Tiger")

== Charts ==
Chart performance for Blood Dynasty
Chart (2025)	Peak position
Austrian Albums (Ö3 Austria)	1
Belgian Albums (Ultratop Flanders)	30
Belgian Albums (Ultratop Wallonia)	18
Dutch Albums (Album Top 100)	38
Finnish Albums (Suomen virallinen lista)	11
French Albums (SNEP)	39
French Rock & Metal Albums (SNEP)	3
German Albums (Offizielle Top 100)	3
Hungarian Physical Albums (MAHASZ)	15
Japanese Albums (Oricon)	21
Japanese Rock Albums (Oricon)	5
Japanese Top Albums Sales (Billboard)	21
Scottish Albums (OCC)	22
Swedish Albums (Sverigetopplistan)	6
Swedish Hard Rock Albums (Sverigetopplistan)	1
Swiss Albums (Schweizer Hitparade)	5
UK Album Downloads (OCC)	10
UK Albums Sales (OCC)	19
UK Physical Albums (OCC)	20
UK Rock & Metal Albums (OCC)	2
