= Tribal Gaze =

American metal band

- Origin: Longview, Texas
- Genre: Death metal
- Years active: 2020–present
- Label: Nuclear Blast
- Members: McKenna Holland; Ian Kilmer; Quintin Stauts; Cesar De Los Santos; Tyler Stafford
- Past members: Zachary Denton

Tribal Gaze is an American death metal band from Longview, Texas founded in 2020.

== History ==
Formed in 2020, the band released their debut extended play, Godless Voyage, in 2021 followed by their debut album, The Nine Choirs, the following year, both via Maggot Stomp. After signing with Nuclear Blast, they released their sophomore album, Inveighing Brilliance, in 2025.

== Current ==
- McKenna Holland – vocals (2020–present)
- Ian Kilmer – guitars (2020–present)
- Quintin Stauts – drums (2020–2021), guitars (2020–present)
- Cesar De Los Santos – drums (2021–present)
- Tyler Stafford – touring bass (2025–present)

== Past ==
- Zachary Denton – bass (2020–2025; on hiatus)

== Discography ==
=== Albums ===
- The Nine Choirs (2022)
- Inveighing Brilliance (2025)

=== EPs ===
- Godless Voyage (2021)

Splits

- With Deadbody (2024)
