= Deceivers (album) =

Studio album by Arch Enemy
- Released: 12 August 2022
- Studio: Hansen Studios
- Genre: Melodic death metal
- Length: 45:09 (standard); 52:54 (special edition)
- Label: Century Media
- Producer: Jacob Hansen

Arch Enemy chronology
Will to Power (2017)	Deceivers (2022)	Blood Dynasty (2025)

Singles from Deceivers
- 1. "Deceiver, Deceiver" Released: 21 October 2021; 2. "House of Mirrors" Released: 9 December 2021; 3. "Handshake with Hell" Released: 4 February 2022; 4. "Sunset over the Empire" Released: 20 May 2022; 5. "In the Eye of the Storm" Released: 14 July 2022; 6. "The Watcher" Released: 14 August 2022; 7. "Poisoned Arrow" Released: 9 February 2023

Professional ratings
Review scores
Source	Rating
Blabbermouth.net	9/10
Distorted Sound	7/10
Kerrang!	4/5 stars
Metal Hammer	8/10
Metal Injection	9/10
Metal Storm	7/10
Sonic Perspectives	8.8/10

Deceivers is the eleventh studio album by Swedish melodic death metal band Arch Enemy. Originally scheduled for a 29 July 2022 release, the album was pushed back to 12 August 2022 for undisclosed reasons. Deceivers is Arch Enemy's first studio album since 2017's Will to Power, marking the longest gap between two of their studio albums. It is also the second and last studio album to feature guitarist Jeff Loomis before his departure from the band in 2023.

== Background and recording ==
Writing began as early as October 2018: main songwriter and guitarist Michael Amott mentioned on an interview with Loudwire that he had "a few new ideas already for new stuff". In February 2021, on "The Riffhard Podcast", lead guitarist Jeff Loomis revealed he was "doing solos for the new Arch Enemy album", though adding he did not know when it would be released.

All of the album was recorded in Europe, except for Loomis' guitar contributions: due to traveling restrictions, he was unable to join the rest of the band, so they ended up "having him do his solos in the studio in Seattle".

The song "Spreading Black Wings" is dedicated to the memory of LG Petrov.

== Promotion ==
"Deceiver, Deceiver" and "House of Mirrors", respectively released on 21 October 2021 and 9 December 2021, were the first two singles from the album, each receiving a music video: however, at that time, the album had not been yet announced, and both tracks were simply marketed as standalone singles.

The album was officially announced on 27 January 2022; the third single "Handshake with Hell" was released eight days later on 4 February 2022, along with its accompanying music video.

On 20 May 2022, the fourth single "Sunset over the Empire" was released alongside a video clip. A 7-inch vinyl single featuring the single alongside "The Judging Eyes", an instrumental remake of War Eternal's "You Will Know My Name", was commercialized in limited edition.

The band announced that the record was postponed by two weeks on 6 June 2022, the reason being "unforeseen circumstances". No further information was issued about the topic.

"In the Eye of the Storm", the fifth and single, was released on 14 July 2022 with its music video.

"The Watcher", the sixth single, was released on August 14, 2022, which was two days after the album's release.

"Poisoned Arrow", the seventh and final single, was released on February 9, 2023.

== Track listing ==
All music is composed by Michael Amott and Daniel Erlandsson except where noted.

No.	Title	Lyrics	Music	Length
1.	"Handshake with Hell"	Alissa White-Gluz		5:39
2.	"Deceiver, Deceiver"	M. Amott		3:52
3.	"In the Eye of the Storm"	M. Amott		4:09
4.	"The Watcher"	White-Gluz		4:58
5.	"Poisoned Arrow"	M. Amott	M. Amott; Erlandsson; Christopher Amott	3:51
6.	"Sunset over the Empire"	M. Amott		4:03
7.	"House of Mirrors"	White-Gluz	M. Amott; C. Amott	3:40
8.	"Spreading Black Wings"	M. Amott		4:46
9.	"Mourning Star"	Instrumental		1:37
10.	"One Last Time"	M. Amott		3:49
11.	"Exiled from Earth"	White-Gluz		4:45
Total length:				45:09

Bonus tracks
No.	Title	Writer(s)	Length
12.	"Diamond Dreamer" (Picture cover)	Picture	3:53
13.	"Into the Pit" (Fight cover)	Rob Halford	3:52
Total length:			52:54

== Personnel ==
=== Arch Enemy ===
- Alissa White-Gluz – vocals
- Michael Amott – rhythm guitar, lead guitar
- Jeff Loomis – lead guitar
- Sharlee D'Angelo – bass
- Daniel Erlandsson – drums, keyboards, sound effects

=== Additional musician ===
- Raphael Liebermann – cello (on "Poisoned Arrow")

=== Technical personnel ===
- Jacob Hansen – production, engineering (drums, vocals), mixing, mastering
- Michael Amott – co-production
- Daniel Erlandsson – co-production, guitar and bass engineering
- Aaron Smith – recording (Jeff Loomis solos)
- Ruben Kamlah – recording (cello on "Poisoned Arrow")
- Alex Reisfar – cover art
- CVSPE (André Trindade) – artwork (booklet)
- Costin Chioreanu – layout
- Patric Ullaeus – photography

== Charts ==
Chart performance for Deceivers
Chart (2022)	Peak position
Australian Albums (ARIA)	49
Austrian Albums (Ö3 Austria)	2
Belgian Albums (Ultratop Flanders)	7
Belgian Albums (Ultratop Wallonia)	13
Czech Albums (ČNS IFPI)	30
Dutch Albums (Album Top 100)	5
Finnish Albums (Suomen virallinen lista)	1
French Albums (SNEP)	14
German Albums (Offizielle Top 100)	2
Hungarian Albums (MAHASZ)	33
Italian Albums (FIMI)	85
Japanese Albums (Oricon)	17
Japanese Hot Albums (Billboard Japan)	14
Polish Albums (ZPAV)	17
Portuguese Albums (AFP)	17
Scottish Albums (Official Charts)	11
Spanish Albums (Promusicae)	11
Swedish Albums (Sverigetopplistan)	9
Swiss Albums (Schweizer Hitparade)	1
UK Albums (Official Charts)	80
UK Rock & Metal Albums (Official Charts)	1
