= War Eternal =

Studio album by Arch Enemy
- Released: 6 June 2014
- Recorded: 2013–2014
- Studio: Fascination Street Studios (Varberg, Sweden); West Coast Songs (Halmstad, Sweden); Sweetspot Satellite (Halmstad, Sweden); Riksmixingsverket (Stockholm, Sweden)
- Genre: Melodic death metal
- Length: 47:30 (standard); 111:29 (artbook)
- Label: Century Media
- Producer: Arch Enemy

Arch Enemy chronology
Khaos Legions (2011)	War Eternal (2014)	Will to Power (2017)

Singles from War Eternal
- 1. "War Eternal" Released: 20 March 2014; 2. "As the Pages Burn" Released: 28 April 2014; 3. "You Will Know My Name" Released: 26 May 2014; 4. "No More Regrets" Released: 10 June 2014; 5. "Stolen Life" Released: 15 February 2015

Professional ratings
Review scores
Source	Rating
Blabbermouth.net	9/10
Metal Hammer DE	6/7
Metal Hammer UK (print)	8/10
Metal Injection	9/10
Terrorizer	7.5/10

War Eternal is the ninth studio album by Swedish melodic death metal band Arch Enemy, which was released first in Japan on 4 June 2014 by Century Media. It is the first Arch Enemy album in 15 years since Burning Bridges to feature a new line-up; Alissa White-Gluz took over on vocals after former long-time vocalist Angela Gossow stepped down from vocal duties to be the band's business manager. Additionally, ex-Arsis guitarist Nick Cordle replaced Christopher Amott in 2012. Cordle ultimately left the band just before their European tour and was replaced by former Nevermore guitarist Jeff Loomis.

== Background and development ==
On 3 March 2014, the band revealed the album's title War Eternal and the release date.

On 17 March 2014, Angela Gossow released a statement announcing her departure from the group and welcoming her replacement, former vocalist of Canadian melodic death metal band The Agonist, Alissa White-Gluz. In the statement, she wrote that while she had enjoyed her time with the group, it was time for her to move on, be with her family and pursue other interests. Gossow did confirm that she would remain Arch Enemy's business manager, and would be "passing the torch to the super talented Alissa White-Gluz, whom I’ve known as a dear friend and a superb vocalist for many years. I always thought she deserved a chance to shine – and now she’s getting it. Just like I got that chance back in 2001."

White-Gluz also released a statement saying:

"I am very honoured and happy to announce a new chapter in my life and musical career. Wages of Sin was the first metal album I ever bought, and it was love at first listen. It is not often that you get a phone call from your favourite band asking you to join! I am thrilled to have the opportunity to work with such amazingly talented musicians whom I also consider great friends. I look forward to being able to write and perform at a whole new level now with Arch Enemy! Music is forever, metal is limitless and this is only the beginning!

== Artwork ==
The artwork for this album was created by Costin Chioreanu. Chief songwriter, guitarist and band leader Michael Amott commented about the artwork:

"I was looking for a hand-drawn feel with a unique atmosphere, something that would complement the music that we’ve been working so hard on these last couple of years. In the end my choice fell upon Romanian artist Chioreanu Costin, whose work I’ve admired for some time. Costin really grasped my vision for the artwork and layout, he’s delivered some of the coolest artwork elements we've ever had with Arch Enemy!

== Promotion ==
The first single and music video, "War Eternal", was released on 20 March 2014. The video was the first of three produced and directed by Patric Ullaeus and his Revolver Film Company. A supporting tour of over 80 dates began in May 2014. The second music video and single was "As the Pages Burn". On 27 May, they released their third music video, "You Will Know My Name". The fourth video, "No More Regrets", was released the same week as the album. A fifth music video for the track "Stolen Life" was released on 5 May 2015 which was the first to include Jeff Loomis on guitar. The track is almost identical to the album version, but it includes two extra solos recorded by Loomis.

== Accolades ==
At the 2014 Burrn! magazine awards, War Eternal won Best Album and the title track won Best Tune.

== Track listing ==
Standard Edition
No.	Title	Lyrics	Music	Length
1.	"Tempore Nihil Sanat (Prelude in F minor)" (Prelude)	Instrumental	Michael Amott	1:12
2.	"Never Forgive, Never Forget"	Amott	Amott, Nick Cordle	3:44
3.	"War Eternal"	Amott	Amott, Cordle	4:16
4.	"As the Pages Burn"	Alissa White-Gluz	Amott	4:01
5.	"No More Regrets"	White-Gluz	Amott, Cordle	4:06
6.	"You Will Know My Name"	Amott	Amott, Cordle	4:37
7.	"Graveyard of Dreams" (Interlude)	Instrumental	Daniel Erlandsson, Amott	1:10
8.	"Stolen Life"	Amott	Amott	3:00
9.	"Time Is Black"	White-Gluz	Amott, Erlandsson	5:24
10.	"On and On"	White-Gluz	Amott, Cordle	4:04
11.	"Avalanche"	White-Gluz	Amott, Cordle, Erlandsson	4:39
12.	"Down to Nothing"	Amott	Amott, Cordle	3:48
13.	"Not Long for This World" (Occlude)	Instrumental	Amott	3:29
Total length:				47:30

Digipak / Mediabook / 3×CD artbook deluxe
No.	Title	Writer(s)	Length
14.	"Shadow on the Wall" (Mike Oldfield cover)	Mike Oldfield	3:03
Total length:			50:33

Japanese edition
No.	Title	Writer(s)	Length
14.	"Breaking the Law" (Judas Priest cover)	Glenn Tipton, Rob Halford, K.K. Downing	2:20
Total length:			49:50

3xCD Artbook Deluxe ("Seeds of War" Bonus Disc)
No.	Title	Length
1.	"Never Forgive, Never Forget" (Demo 2013)	3:44
2.	"No More Regrets" (Demo 2013)	4:00
3.	"You Will Know My Name" (Demo 2013)	4:15
4.	"On and On" (Demo 2013)	4:02
5.	"As the Pages Burn" (Demo 2013)	3:50
Total length:		19:51

3×CD artbook deluxe (instrumental play-through bonus disc & guitar tabs)
No.	Title	Length
1.	"Never Forgive, Never Forget" (Instrumental Play-Through)	3:47
2.	"War Eternal" (Instrumental Play-Through)	4:18
3.	"As the Pages Burn" (Instrumental Play-Through)	4:02
4.	"No More Regrets" (Instrumental Play-Through)	4:07
5.	"You Will Know My Name" (Instrumental Play-Through)	4:39
6.	"Stolen Life" (Instrumental Play-Through)	3:00
7.	"Time Is Black" (Instrumental Play-Through)	5:26
8.	"On and On" (Instrumental Play-Through)	4:07
9.	"Avalanche" (Instrumental Play-Through)	4:40
10.	"Down to Nothing" (Instrumental Play-Through)	3:51
Total length:		41:57

== Personnel ==
=== Arch Enemy ===
- Alissa White-Gluz − vocals
- Michael Amott − guitars
- Nick Cordle − guitars, keyboards
- Sharlee D'Angelo − bass
- Daniel Erlandsson − drums, keyboards
- Jeff Loomis − lead guitar on "Stolen Life"

=== Additional musicians ===
- Per Wiberg − mellotron
- Henrik Janson − orchestration, string arrangements
- Ulf Janson − keyboards, orchestration, string arrangements
- Stockholm Session Strings − strings

=== Production and design ===
- Michael Amott − production
- Daniel Erlandsson − engineering (guitars & bass)
- Nick Cordle − engineering (guitars & bass)
- Staffan Karlsson − engineering (vocals)
- Johan Örnborg − engineering (drums)
- Linn Fijal − engineering (strings & keyboards)
- Jens Bogren − mixing, mastering
- Costin Chioreanu − artwork, layout
- Patric Ullaeus − photography
- Jens Prüter − A&R

== Charts ==
Chart (2014)	Peak position
Austrian Albums (Ö3 Austria)	13
Belgian Albums (Ultratop Flanders)	39
Belgian Albums (Ultratop Wallonia)	43
Czech Albums (ČNS IFPI)	26
Danish Albums (Hitlisten)	38
Dutch Albums (Album Top 100)	36
Finnish Albums (Suomen virallinen lista)	5
French Albums (SNEP)	56
German Albums (Offizielle Top 100)	9
Italian Albums (FIMI)	89
Scottish Albums (OCC)	87
Swedish Albums (Sverigetopplistan)	40
Swiss Albums (Schweizer Hitparade)	16
UK Albums (OCC)	85
UK Rock & Metal Albums (OCC)	7
US Billboard 200	44
US Top Album Sales (Billboard)	44
US Top Hard Rock Albums (Billboard)	5
US Top Rock Albums (Billboard)	17
US Independent Albums (Billboard)	11

== Release history ==
Region	Date	Label	Format
Japan	4 June 2014	Trooper Entertainment	CD
Europe	9 June 2014	Century Media Records	CD
US	10 June 2014	Century Media Records	CD
Australia	13 June 2014	Century Media Records	CD
Indonesia	8 March 2015	Zim Zum Entertainment	Cassette
