= Alissa White-Gluz =

Canadian singer (born 1985)

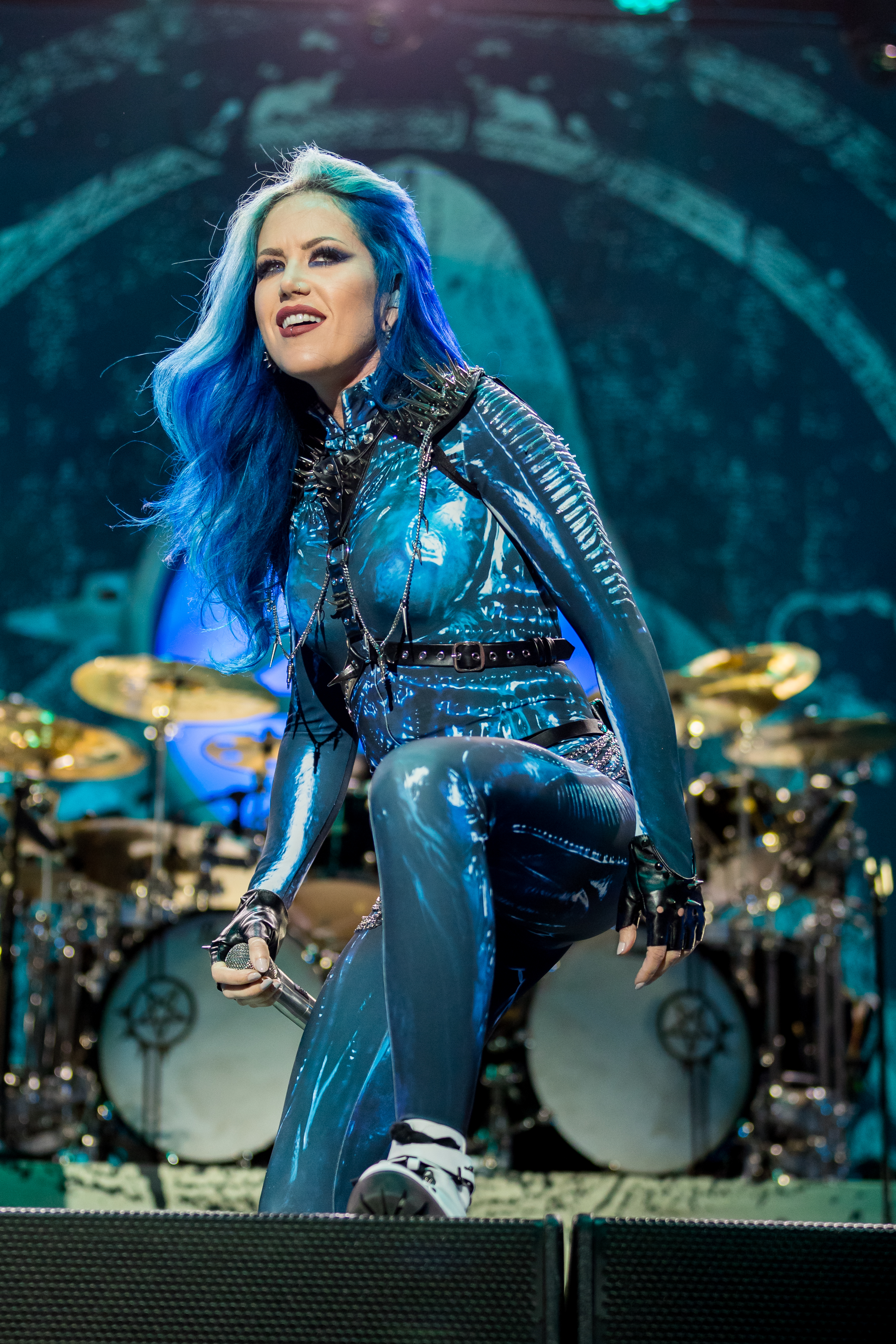
- White-Gluz performing in 2023

Background information
- Born: 31 July 1985 (age 41); Montreal, Quebec, Canada
- Genres: Melodic death metal; metalcore; power metal
- Occupations: Singer, songwriter
- Years active: 2004–present
- Member of: Blue Medusa; DragonForce
- Formerly of: Arch Enemy; The Agonist

Alissa White-Gluz (/əˈliːsə ˈɡlʌz/; born 31 July 1985), known professionally as Alissa (commonly styled in all caps), is a Canadian musician, best known as the former lead vocalist of the Swedish melodic death metal band Arch Enemy, former lead vocalist and founding member of the Canadian metalcore band The Agonist, and current vocalist of the British power metal band DragonForce and heavy metal band Blue Medusa.

Her vocal style includes both growling and clean singing. Although primarily associated with melodic death metal and metalcore, she has appeared as a guest vocalist for power metal, symphonic metal and deathcore bands, notably Kamelot, Delain, Carnifex and Powerwolf, and has performed live with Nightwish and Tarja Turunen.

== Early life ==
White-Gluz was born in Montreal, Quebec, Canada, as the second of three children. Her grandparents were Jewish prisoners in concentration camps during World War II and managed to escape. Their experiences in the camps would go on to inspire the Arch Enemy song "First Day in Hell". She is the younger sister of Jasamine White-Gluz who leads the Montreal-based band No Joy.

== Career ==
=== The Agonist (2004–2014) ===
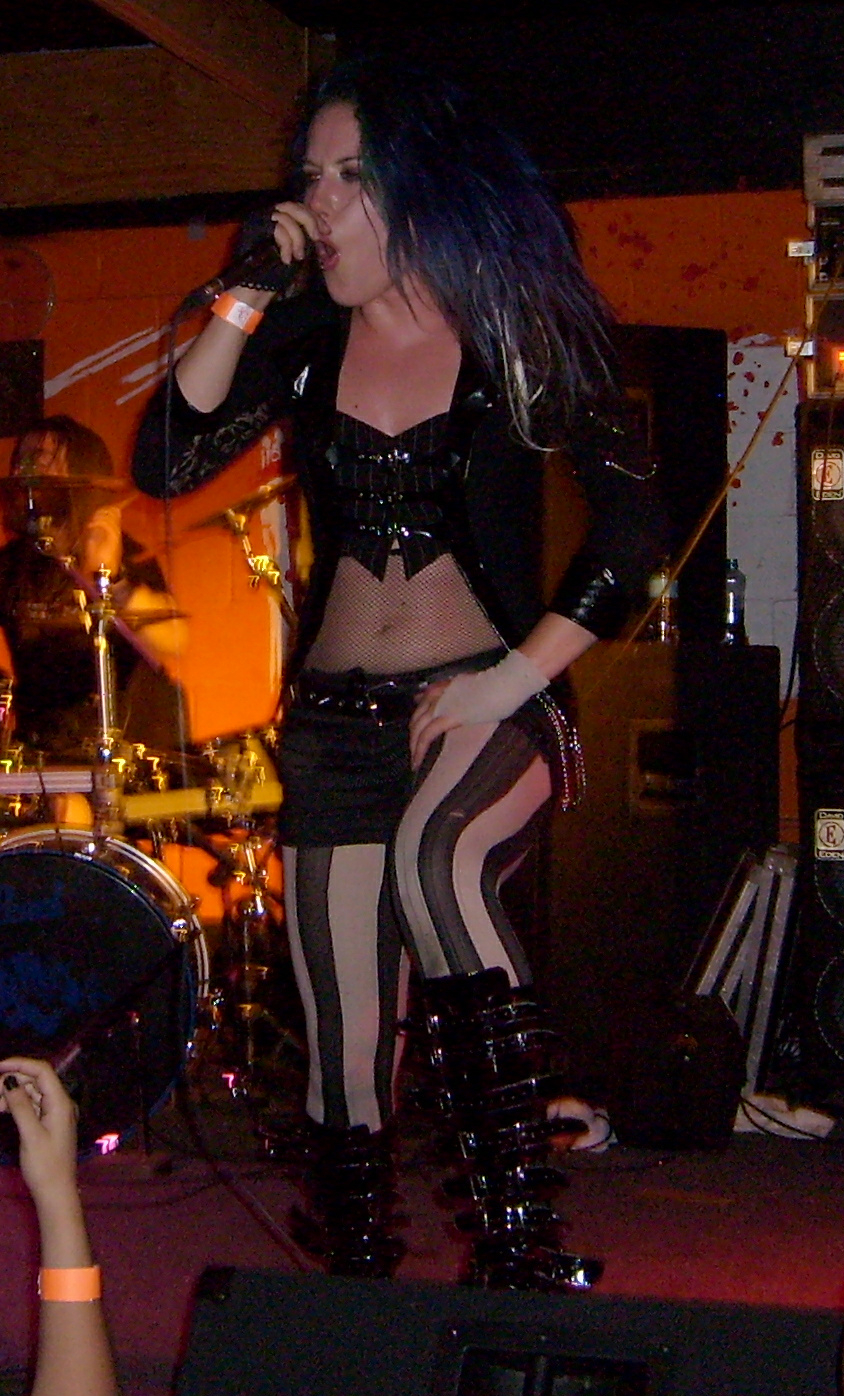
White-Gluz performing with The Agonist in 2009

In 2004, White-Gluz formed The Agonist (then known as "Tempest") with fellow band members Danny Marino and Chris Kells in Montreal. She released three albums with them as their lead vocalist. White-Gluz was kicked out of The Agonist in the spring of 2014 after she was offered the role as vocalist for Arch Enemy and proposed her interest in working in both bands at once.

=== Arch Enemy (2014–2025) ===
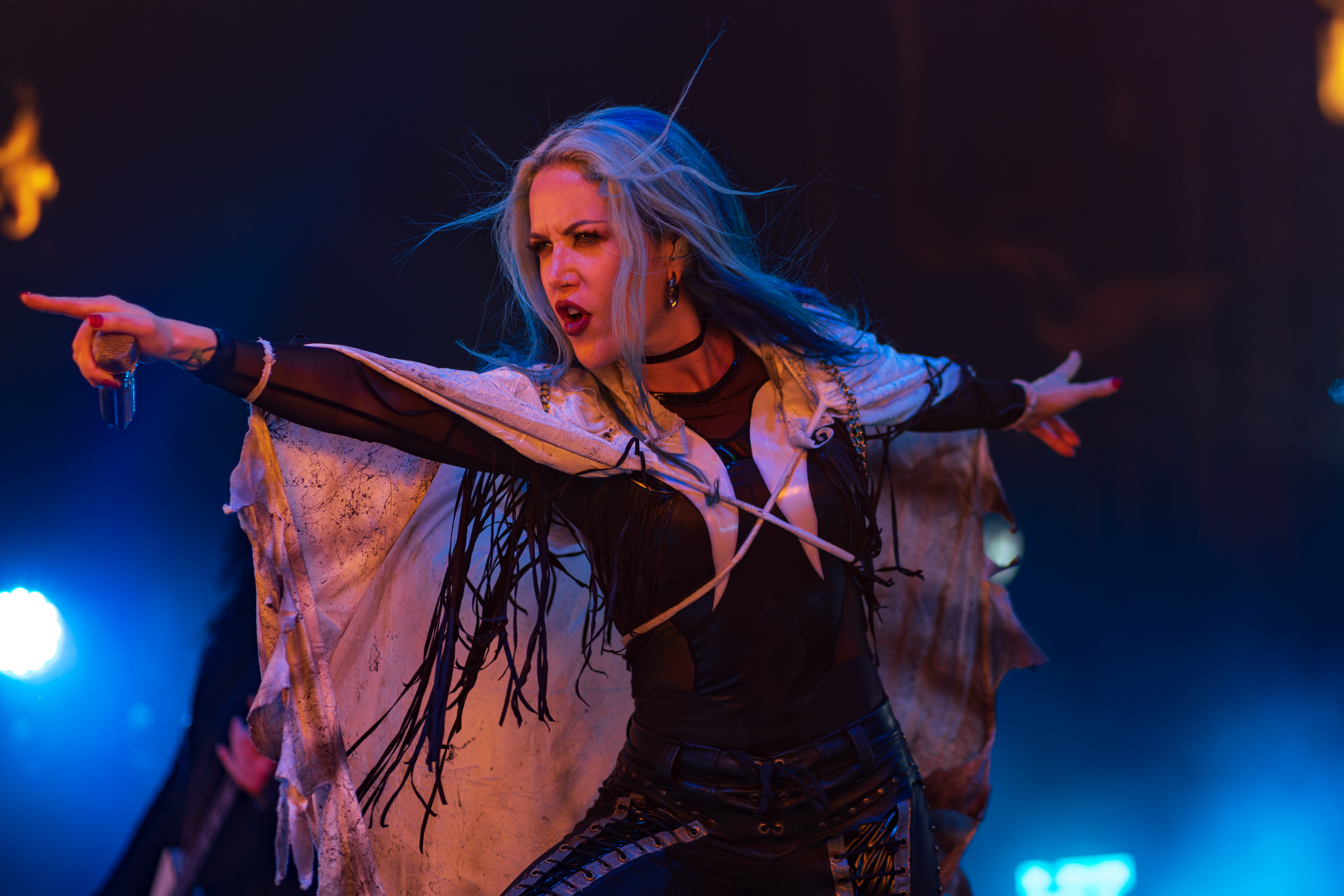
White-Gluz performing with Arch Enemy in 2022

In March 2014, Arch Enemy announced via press release that White-Gluz would be replacing their former vocalist Angela Gossow.

With Arch Enemy, she released four studio albums (War Eternal, Will to Power, Deceivers and Blood Dynasty) and two live albums (Tokyo Sacrifice and As the Stages Burn!).

On November 23, 2025, Arch Enemy announced her departure from the band, after more than a decade as the frontwoman.

=== Blue Medusa (2026–present) ===
On March 8, 2026, White-Gluz announced the formation of her new band Blue Medusa, alongside guitarists Alyssa Day and Dani Sophia.

=== DragonForce (2026–present) ===
On May 6, 2026, the British power metal band DragonForce announced that White-Gluz had joined the band as the second lead vocalist.

=== Solo career ===
White-Gluz signed a deal with Napalm Records in 2016 to release a solo album entitled Alissa. In a 2017 interview with Duke TV, she announced that her album would feature collaborations with Kamelot members, and said that the sound of the album would be "pretty different" from that of Arch Enemy.

On November 23, 2025, White-Gluz announced that she would be leaving Arch Enemy and kickstarting a solo career. That same day, she released the first single of her first upcoming solo album, titled "The Room Where She Died". White-Gluz performed, recorded, and wrote all of the vocals for the single. With this release, she also announced that the album would be released under the moniker "Alissa", stating that she wanted to "keep it simple" and "make it very clear who it is and what it is."

=== Guest vocal work ===
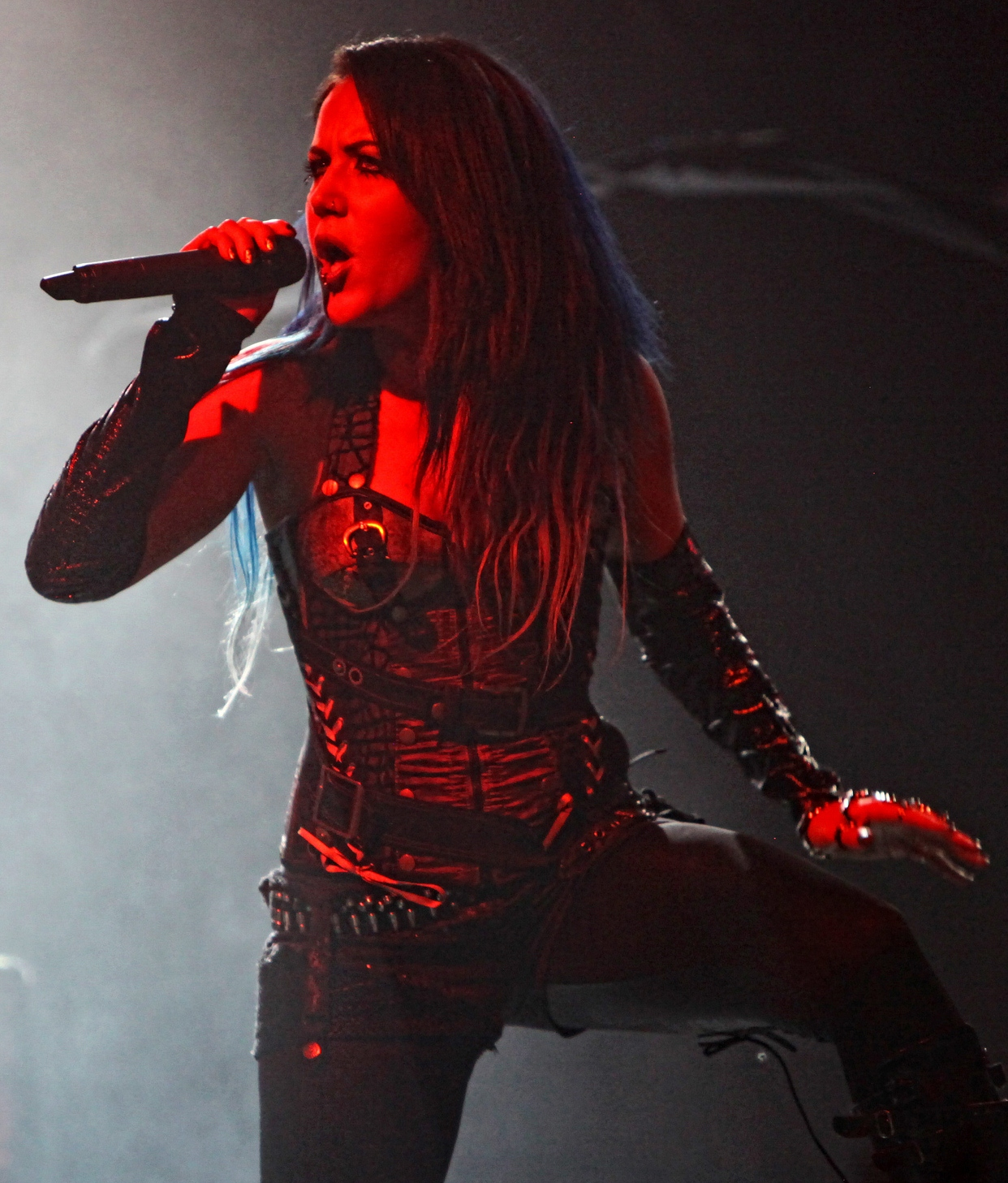
White-Gluz performing with Kamelot in 2012

White-Gluz has recorded guest vocals for Blackguard's 2008 EP Another Round, as well as for Slaves on Dope's 2012 album Over the Influence.

White-Gluz has worked with Kamelot on a number of occasions. In September and October 2012, she was a guest vocalist for Kamelot when they were the supporting act for Nightwish's North American tour. In February 2015, Kamelot announced that she would contribute guest vocals to their Haven album.

At the Denver show on 28 September 2012, White-Gluz and Elize Ryd performed the Nightwish lead vocals live on stage with minimal preparation after Anette Olzon was taken ill. White-Gluz, Ryd and Tommy Karevik later joined Nightwish (now fronted by Floor Jansen) on stage again to sing the final song of the tour, "Last Ride of the Day", in Orlando on 14 October 2012. Arch Enemy, with White-Gluz as lead vocalist, joined Nightwish as a supporting act on their 2015 European tour.

In February 2014, the Dutch symphonic metal band Delain announced that White-Gluz would be contributing guest vocals to their fourth studio album The Human Contradiction. White-Gluz made a second guest appearance with Delain in 2016 on "Hands of Gold", the opening track of their fifth studio album Moonbathers.

In 2017, White-Gluz recorded guest vocals for Doyle Wolfgang von Frankenstein's band, DOYLE. She appears on the band's second album, DOYLE II, on the track "Kiss Me As We Die", providing background vocals. White-Gluz and Doyle Wolfgang von Frankenstein have been in a relationship since 2014.

In 2018, White-Gluz recorded guest vocals for Angra's album Omni, which was released in February 2018. She appears on the third track "Black Widow's Web" alongside Brazilian singer Sandy. She also contributed to Dee Snider's album For The Love of Metal on the track "Dead Hearts Love Thy Enemy" and Kane Robert's/Alice Cooper's Beginning of the End. She provided guest vocals for Soilwork on the song "Stålfågel", which is part of their eleventh studio album Verkligheten. The album was released on 11 January 2019.

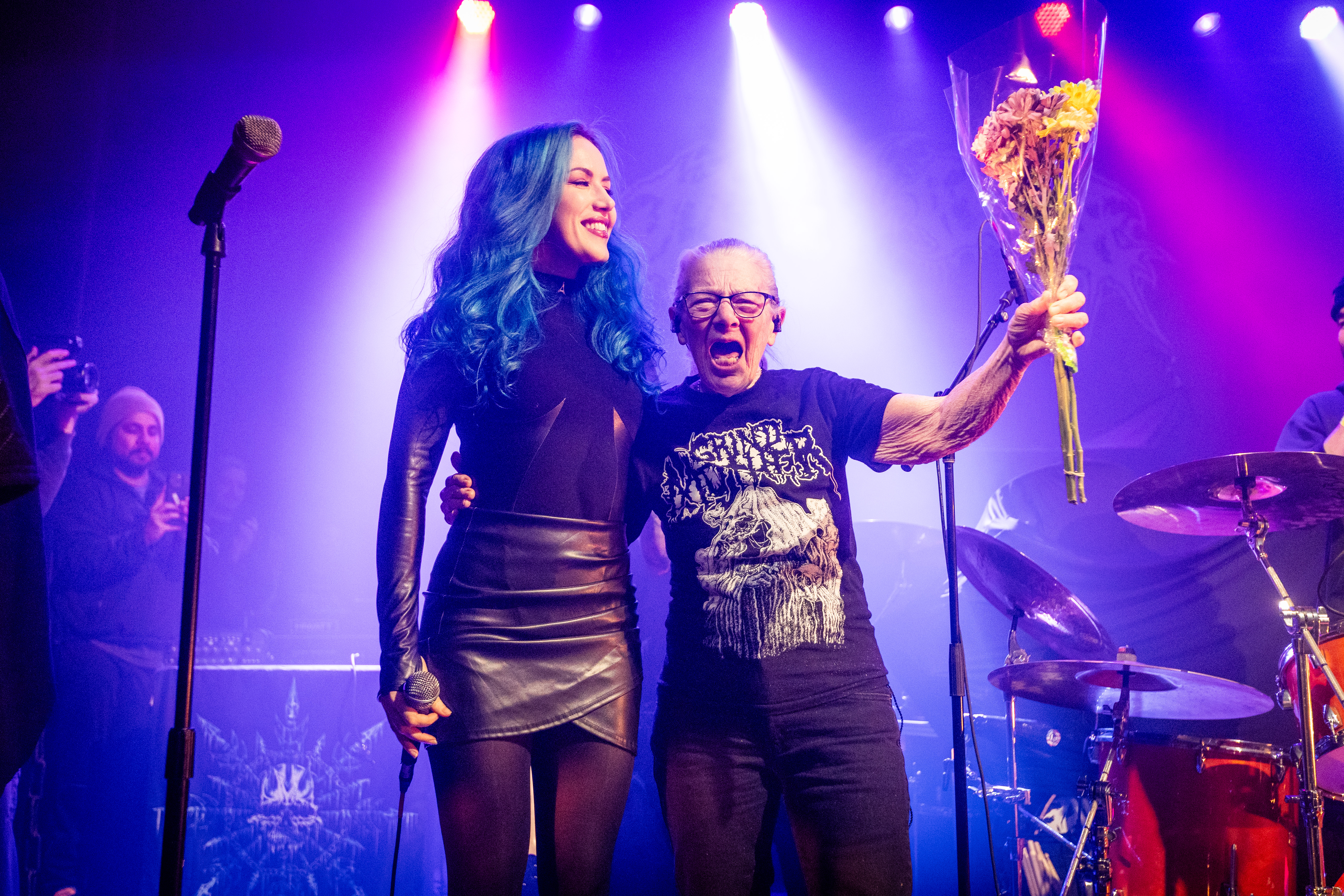
White-Gluz on stage with Grindmother during the latter's farewell show in 2025

White-Gluz recorded guest vocals for the American deathcore act, Carnifex, on the song "No Light Shall Save Us", which is on the band's seventh studio album, World War X. It was released on 2 August 2019 through Nuclear Blast Records.

In December 2025, Alissa joined Canadian grindcore band Grindmother onstage to perform three songs at the band's farewell show at Club Soda in Montreal.

In June 2026, Alissa joined Kittie onstage to perform "What I Always Wanted" at Théâtre Beanfield in Montreal.

== Other media ==
White-Gluz is appearing in visual companion content to American Murder Song as Pretty Lavinia.

In addition to her music career, White-Gluz also had a voice acting stint where she voiced the Swarm Hunters in Gears 5.

White-Gluz was an executive producer for the 2024 British documentary film I Could Never Go Vegan.

== Personal life ==
White-Gluz has been in a relationship with Doyle Wolfgang von Frankenstein since 2014, the guitarist of American horror punk band Misfits.

She was raised in a family of vegetarians, and has been a vegan since 1998. She follows a straight-edge lifestyle. She is Jewish, but identifies as an atheist and considers herself opposed to religion, though she noted that "it doesn't mean [she hates] religious people or [is] opposed to them".

=== Interests ===
White-Gluz is a fan of classical music as well as rock music. She enjoys 1990s grunge music such as Nirvana, Stone Temple Pilots, and Soundgarden. "I know a lot of people hate it but I love the simplicity, the stripped-down, honest songs and the mistakes. On Nirvana's live album for example I love hearing the out-of-tune guitars and the cracks in the voice", White-Gluz said in an interview with Metal Hammer. In an interview with Patreon, White-Gluz stated that punk rock and hardcore punk are linked to her social values.

=== Activism ===
In a 2018 interview with Metal Hammer, White-Gluz said she had been "vegan for about 18 years", but that she had engaged in animal rights activism since childhood. She received a Libby award from PETA for her work in an international campaign advocating against the hunting of Canadian seals. In 2023, she posed as a mermaid in a PETA anti-fishing ad campaign. White-Gluz appears in the documentary Punk Rock Vegan Movie by Moby which was released in February 2023.

== Discography ==
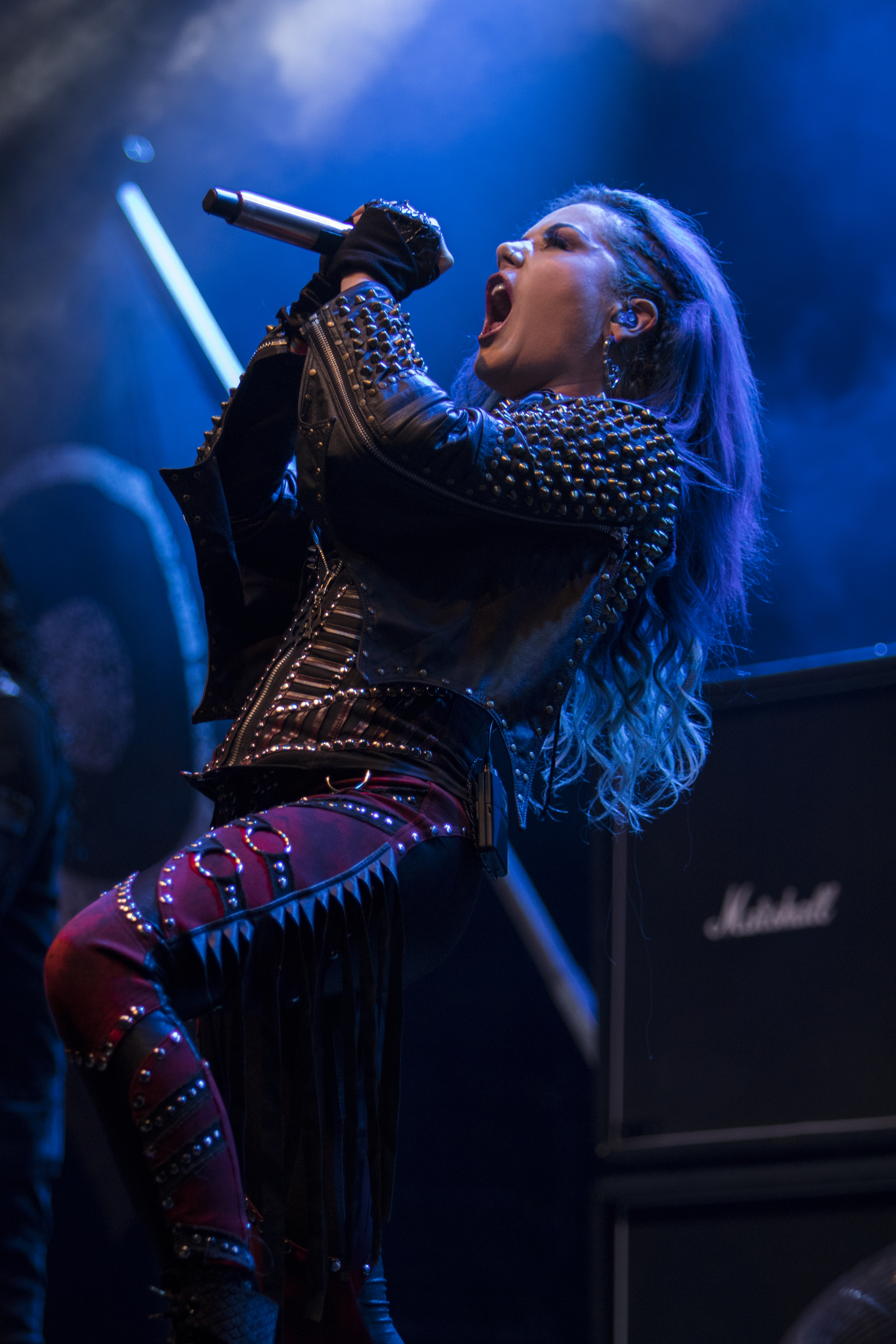
White-Gluz performing with Arch Enemy in 2019

=== The Agonist ===
- 2007 – Once Only Imagined
- 2009 – Lullabies for the Dormant Mind
- 2011 – The Escape (EP)
- 2012 – Prisoners

=== Arch Enemy ===
- 2014 – War Eternal
- 2017 – As the Stages Burn!
- 2017 – Will to Power
- 2019 – Covered in Blood
- 2022 – Deceivers
- 2025 – Blood Dynasty

=== DragonForce ===
- 2027 – DragonForce

=== Guest appearances ===
Year	Main artist	Track	Album	Label
2008	Never More Than Less	"So Beautiful"	Relentless	Le Collectif Artcore
2008	Synastry	"In Your Eyes"	Blind Eyes Bleed	Year of the Sun
2008	The Plasmarifle	"From the Trail of Ashes..."	While You Were Sleeping, The World Forever Changed In An Instant	Siege of Amida
2009	Blackguard	"The Sword"	Profugus Mortis	Sumerian
2010	Erimha	"The Legend of Ereshkigal"	Irkalla	Independent
2012	Kamelot	"Sacrimony (Angel of Afterlife)"	Silverthorn	SVP/Steamhammer
2012	Kamelot	"Prodigal Son (Part III: The Journey)	Silverthorn	SVP/Steamhammer
2014	Delain	"The Tragedy of the Commons"	The Human Contradiction	Napalm
2015	Kamelot	"Liar Liar (Wasteland Monarchy)"	Haven	Napalm
2015	Kamelot	"Revolution"	Haven	Napalm
2015	Metal Allegiance	"We Rock"	Metal Allegiance	Nuclear Blast
2016	Caliban	"The Ocean's Heart"	Gravity	Century Media
2016	And Then She Came	"Five Billion Lies"	And Then She Came	Napalm
2016	Tarja	"Demons in You"	The Shadow Self	earMUSIC
2016	Delain	"Hands of Gold"	Moonbathers	Napalm
2016	Metal Allegiance	"Life in the Fast Lane"	Fallen Heroes	Nuclear Blast
2016	Evesdroppers	"Gods Ocean"	Empty Vessel	Casual Madness
2017	Aurelio Voltaire	"Leaves in the Stream"	Heart-Shaped Wound	Projekt
2017	Doyle	"Kiss Me as We Die"	As We Die	Monsterman
2017	Delain	"Hands of Gold"	A Decade of Delain: Live at Paradiso	Napalm
2017	Delain	"The Tragedy of the Commons"	A Decade of Delain: Live at Paradiso	Napalm
2018	Angra	"Black Widow's Web"	ØMNI	Edel Music
2018	Dee Snider	"Dead Hearts (Love Thy Enemy)"	For the Love of Metal	Napalm
2019	Soilwork	"Stålfågel"	Verkligheten	Nuclear Blast
2019	Mark Morton	"The Truth is Dead"	Anesthetic	Spinefarm
2019	Carnifex	"No Light Shall Save Us"	World War X	Nuclear Blast
2019	Kane Roberts	"Beginning of the End"	The New Normal	Frontiers
2019	Babymetal	"Distortion"	Metal Galaxy	earMUSIC
2020	No Joy	"Dream Rats"	Motherhood	Joyful Noise Recordings
2020	Kamelot	"March of Mephisto"	I Am the Empire – Live from the 013	Napalm
2020	Kamelot	"Sacrimony (Angel of Afterlife)"	I Am the Empire – Live from the 013	Napalm
2020	Kamelot	"Liar Liar (Wasteland Monarchy)"	I Am the Empire – Live from the 013	Napalm
2021	Me and That Man	"Goodbye"	New Man, New Songs, Same Shit, Vol. 2	Napalm
2021	Powerwolf	"Demons Are a Girl's Best Friend"	Call of the Wild	Napalm
2021	Charlotte Wessels	"Lizzie"	Tales from Six Feet Under	Napalm
2022	Helloween	"Best Time"	Non-album track	Atomic Fire
2022	Nita Strauss	"The Wolf You Feed"	The Call of the Void	Sumerian
2023	Punk Rock Factory	"Part of Your World"	Poor Unfortunate Souls	The Sausage Factory
2024	Charlotte Wessels	"Fool's Parade"	Non-album track	Independent
2024	DragonForce	"Burning Heart"	Warp Speed Warriors	Napalm
2024	Simone Simons	"Cradle to the Grave"	Vermillion	Nuclear Blast
2024	Charlotte Wessels	"Ode to the West Wind"	The Obsession	Napalm
2024	Kat Von D	"I Am a Machine"	My Side of the Mountain	Kartel
2025	DragonForce	"Burning Heart"	Warp Speed Warriors	Napalm
2025	Savage Lands	"Ruling Queen"	Army of the Trees	Season of Mist
2025	King Ultramega	"The Day I Tried to Live"	Non-album track	Reigning Phoenix Music
2026	Cole Rolland	"Breathing"	Non-album track	Independent
2026	Epica	"Sirens - Of Blood and Water (Live at Ziggo Dome)"	Non-album track	Nuclear Blast
2026	Bear McCreary	"Our Kingdom"	The Singularity: Ekleipsis	Sparks & Shadows

=== Other appearances ===
- Karmaflow – "The Muse and the Conductor" – as The Muse (2015)
- Karmaflow – "The Muse's Lament" – as The Muse (2016)
- Karmaflow – "The Muse and the Conductor" (2016)
- American Murder Song – as Pretty Lavinia (2016)
- Metal: Hellsinger – "Stygia" (2022)
