= Arch Enemy =

Swedish melodic death metal band

- Arch Enemy at Wacken Open Air 2026.

Background information
- Origin: Halmstad, Sweden
- Genre: Melodic death metal
- Years active: 1995−present
- Labels: Century Media; Wrong Again
- Members: Michael Amott; Daniel Erlandsson; Sharlee D'Angelo; Joey Concepcion; Lauren Hart
- Past members: Johan Liiva; Christopher Amott; Martin Bengtsson; Peter Wildoer; Fredrik Åkesson; Angela Gossow; Nick Cordle; Jeff Loomis; Alissa White-Gluz
- Website: archenemy.net

Arch Enemy is a Swedish melodic death metal band, originally a supergroup from Halmstad, formed in 1995. Its members have been in bands such as Carcass, Armageddon, Carnage, Mercyful Fate, Spiritual Beggars, The Agonist, Nevermore, Eucharist, and Once Human. Carcass guitarist Michael Amott founded Arch Enemy with Johan Liiva. They were both originally from death metal band Carnage. The band has released eleven studio albums, three live albums, three video albums and four EPs. Liiva fronted the band until German vocalist Angela Gossow replaced him in 2000. Gossow left the band in March 2014 to become the group's manager. Canadian vocalist Alissa White-Gluz replaced her. White-Gluz left the band at the end of 2025. American vocalist Lauren Hart was announced as the band's new frontwoman on 19 February 2026.

== History ==
=== Early years and Black Earth (1995–1997) ===
Michael Amott and Johan Liiva formed Arch Enemy in 1995. Debut album Black Earth was recorded over nine days in Studio Fredman and released by the now defunct Wrong Again Records in 1996.

=== Stigmata, Burning Bridges, and Gossow (1998–2000) ===
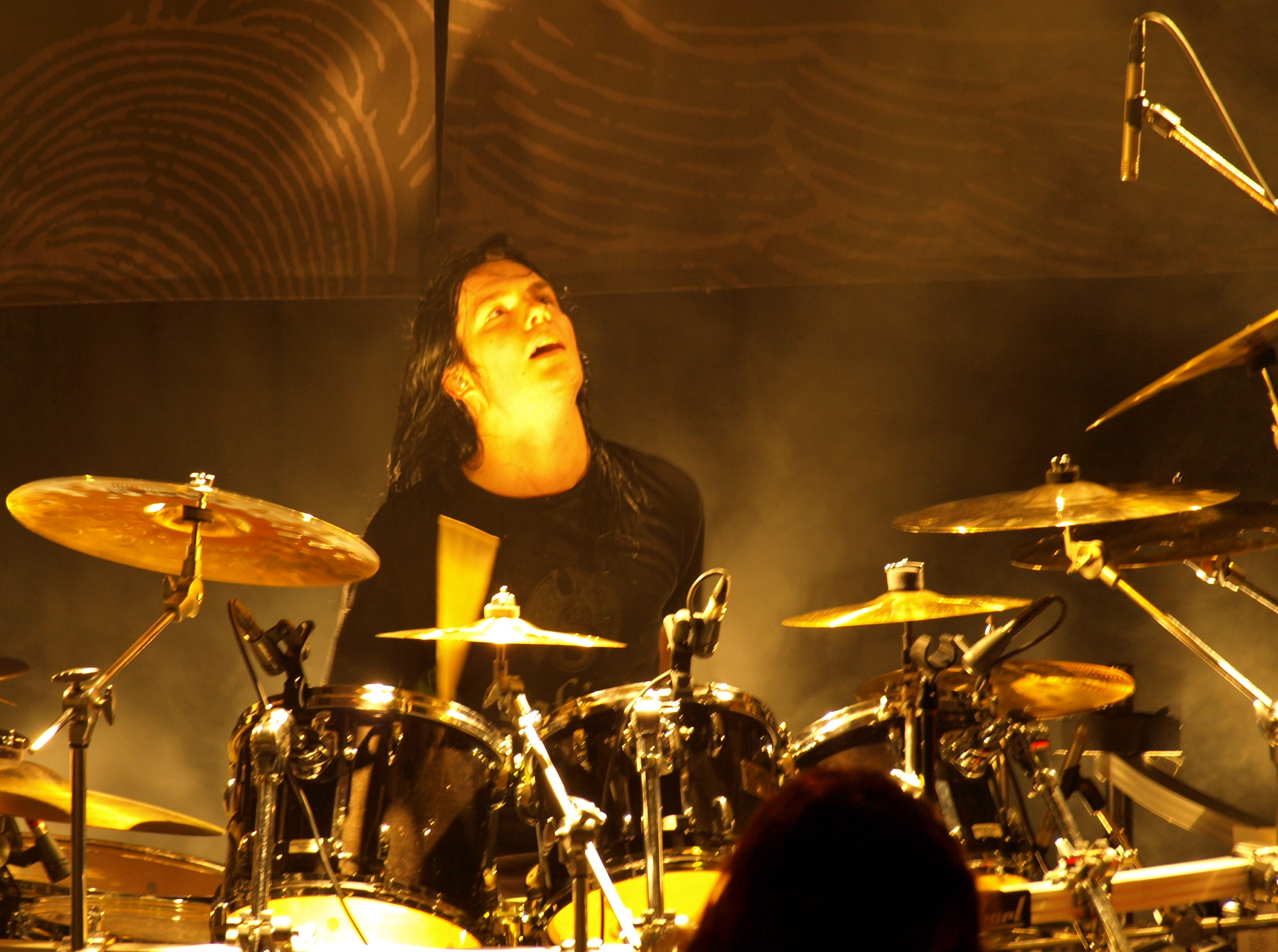
Drummer Daniel Erlandsson

After the release of Black Earth, the band switched labels and signed a contract with Century Media. In 1998, Arch Enemy released Stigmata, for which bassist Martin Bengtsson and drummer Peter Wildoer joined the band. The album gained the band a wider audience and popularity in Europe and America. This was the first Arch Enemy album to be released worldwide.

In 1999, bassist Sharlee D'Angelo (ex-King Diamond, ex-Mercyful Fate) joined Arch Enemy's bassist. Daniel Erlandsson (Eucharist, ex-Carcass) was recruited as the drummer. Burning Bridges was released, followed by the live album Burning Japan Live 1999. During the touring-cycle for Burning Bridges, D'Angelo was temporarily replaced twice, first with Dick Lövgren (Meshuggah, ex-Armageddon) and then with Roger Nilsson (ex-Spiritual Beggars, Firebird, the Quill).

In November 2000, the band fired vocalist Johan Liiva via a letter during the beginning of the Wages of Sin album sessions and was replaced with German death metal vocalist Angela Gossow, who made her debut on that album.

=== Wages of Sin and Anthems of Rebellion (2001–2004) ===
The first album with songs featuring Gossow was Wages of Sin, released in 2001. In December of the year, Arch Enemy took part in the "Japan's Beast Feast 2002" concert, playing with Slayer and Motörhead.

Anthems of Rebellion was released in 2003 and brought some innovations, such as the use of a second voice singing in harmony in such tracks as "End of the Line" and "Dehumanization". In November of the following year, the band released the EP Dead Eyes See No Future, which featured live recordings and covers of Manowar, Megadeth and Carcass songs. In June 2004, the band embarked on another Japan tour.

=== Doomsday Machine (2004–2006) ===
In June 2005, Arch Enemy finished recording their sixth album, Doomsday Machine. In July 2005, guitarist Christopher Amott left the band to focus on his personal life. He was temporarily replaced with guitarist Gus G. (ex-Ozzy Osbourne, Firewind) and then with Fredrik Åkesson (Opeth, ex-Talisman) in September 2005. The band performed at Wacken Open Air in August of 2006. Christopher returned on a permanent basis in March 2007, shortly before the band entered the studio to record their new album with producer Fredrik Nordström, who had worked with the band on their first four albums. Åkesson became Opeth's lead guitarist in May 2007.

=== Rise of the Tyrant (2007–2008) ===
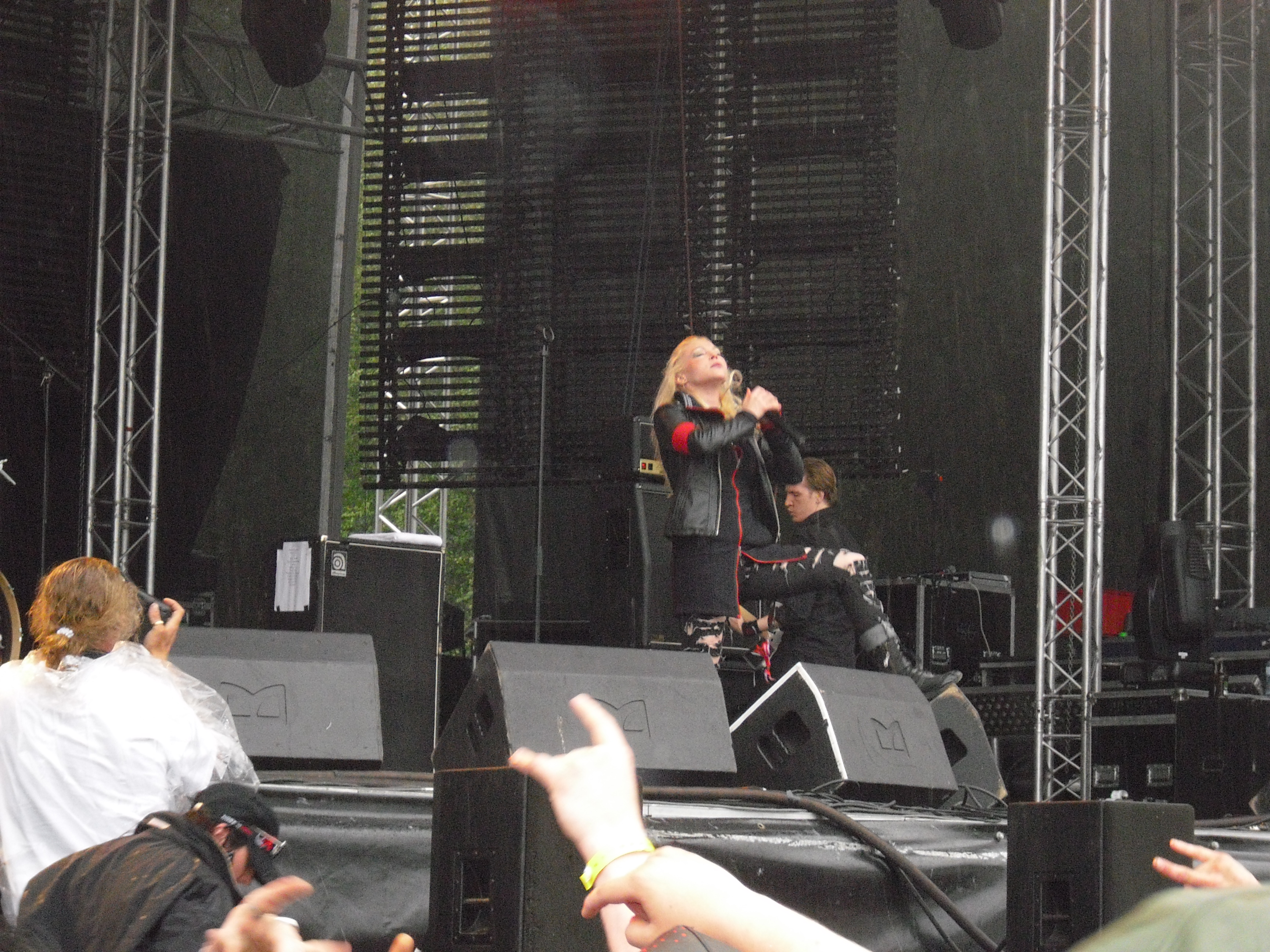
Arch Enemy performing live at Norway Rock Festival in 2009

Arch Enemy's seventh album, Rise of the Tyrant, was released on 24 September 2007 in Europe and 25 September 2007 in the United States. Rise of the Tyrant debuted at number 84 on the Billboard 200 chart. This surpassed the Doomsday Machine chart entry, making it the band's highest charting effort to date. Gossow said the album had more emotion and less double vocals, as well as less vocal processing, yielding a more "raw" presentation.

Arch Enemy played the Bloodstock Open Air Festival in August 2007, between Sabbat and In Flames. They performed on the Black Crusade tour at the end of 2007 with Machine Head, Trivium, DragonForce and Shadows Fall.

On 8 March 2008, Arch Enemy filmed a live show in Tokyo, Japan for the live DVD Tyrants of the Rising Sun. Arch Enemy co-headlined the Defenders of the Faith tour in April 2008 with Opeth, while DevilDriver and 3 Inches of Blood opened for them. They headlined the Tyranny and Bloodshred tour in May 2008 with Dark Tranquillity, Divine Heresy, and Firewind as supporting acts.

=== The Root of All Evil (2009–2010) ===
The compilation album The Root of All Evil was released on 28 September 2009 in Europe, 30 September in Japan, and 6 October in the United States. The Root of All Evil features twelve re-recorded songs spanning the band's career before Gossow joined as vocalist, with some material pre-dating D'Angelo as their bassist. In the first half of 2009, the band toured Europe and South America, and played at the annual "Dubai Desert Rock Festival" with Opeth, Chimaira, and Motörhead. Following the release of The Root of All Evil on 28 September 2009, the band embarked on an Asian and Australian tour, which included their first visit to New Zealand. The tour started at the Loud Park festival in Japan on 17 October, supplementing other acts including Megadeth, Judas Priest, Slayer, Anthrax, Rob Zombie and Children of Bodom. They toured South Korea on 25 October, headlining the Melon AX Hall in Seoul.

=== Khaos Legions and Christopher's second departure (2011–2013) ===
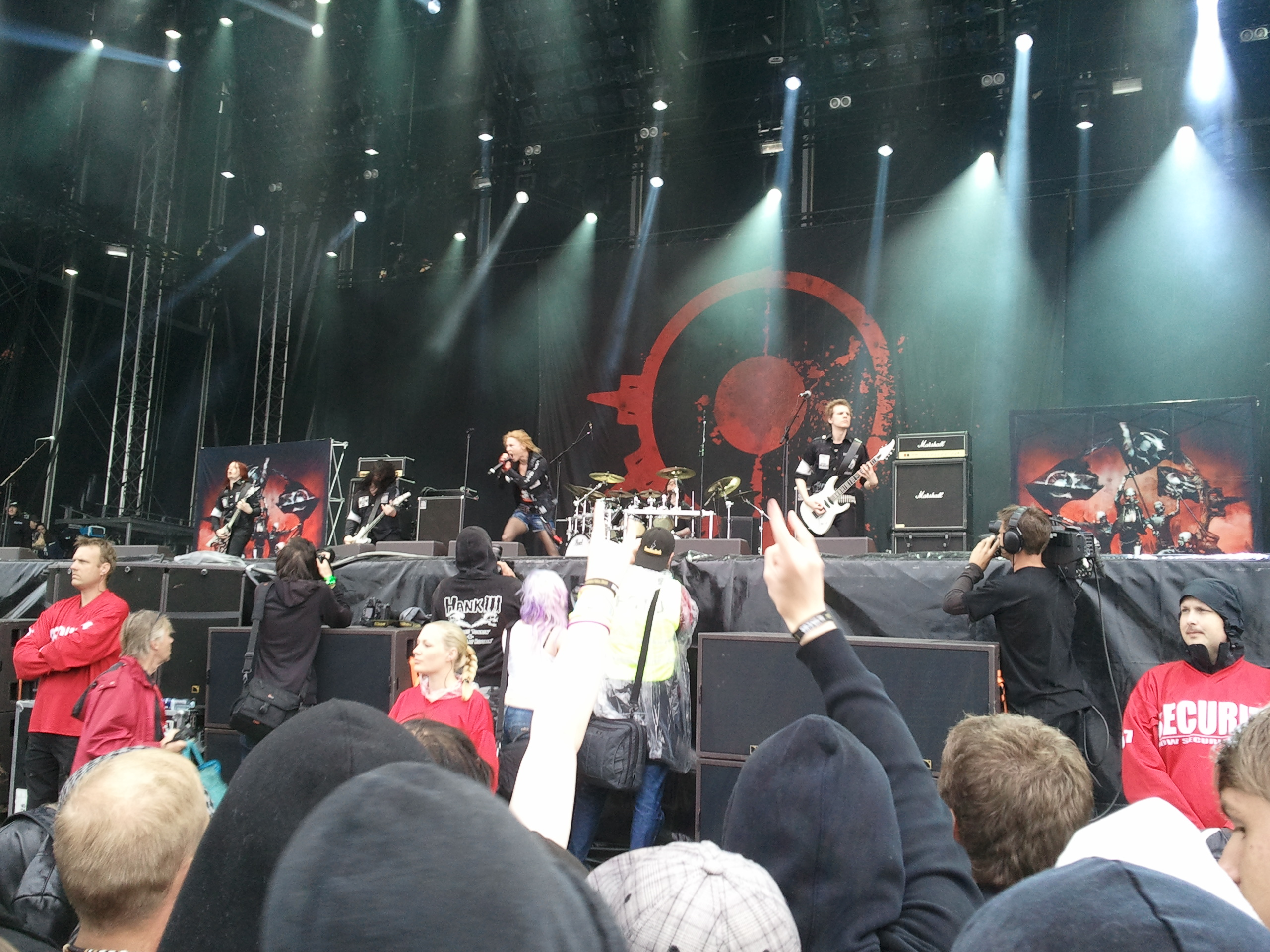
Arch Enemy performing live at Metaltown Festival 2011

According to a September 2010 interview with Angela Gossow, Arch Enemy entered the studio on 1 December to begin recording their eighth album, Khaos Legions, for a release in June 2011, according to the band's website. The first single from the album, "Yesterday is Dead and Gone", was released on the Century Media website on 31 March. The album was released on 31 May 2011. On 12 December, the band announced that they would film a show in Cologne the following day for the upcoming live DVD "World Khaos Tour".

On 3 March 2012, the band's Facebook page announced that Christopher Amott had departed the band again. He was replaced with Nick Cordle from Arsis. Arch Enemy released their third music video from Khaos Legions on 25 April 2012 for "Under Black Flags We March". Cordle appeared in the video and recorded a new guitar solo, making this his debut track with the band.

=== Gossow's departure, War Eternal and side project (2013–2017) ===
Arch Enemy performed at the Wacken Open Air music festival in August of 2013. On 3 March 2014, the band revealed their ninth album would be titled War Eternal, released in June 2014.

On 17 March 2014, Gossow released a statement announcing her departure from the group and welcoming her replacement, former vocalist of Canadian metalcore band the Agonist, Alissa White-Gluz. In the statement, she wrote that she had enjoyed her time with the group but it was time for her to move on, be with her family and pursue other interests. Gossow confirmed that she would remain Arch Enemy's business manager and would be "passing the torch to the super talented Alissa White-Gluz, whom I've known as a dear friend and a superb vocalist for many years. I always thought she deserved a chance to shine – and now she's getting it. Just like I got that chance back in 2001."

White-Gluz released a statement saying, "I am very honored and happy to announce a new chapter in my life and musical career. Wages of Sin was the first metal album I ever bought, and it was love at first listen. It is not often that you get a phone call from your favorite band asking you to join! I am thrilled to have the opportunity to work with such amazingly talented musicians whom I also consider great friends. I look forward to being able to write and perform at a whole new level now with Arch Enemy! Music is forever, metal is limitless and this is only the beginning!"

During Arch Enemy's North American tour in support of their album War Eternal, guitarist Nick Cordle left the band on 10 November 2014. He left the stage with a few songs remaining in the set during the show at San Francisco's Regency Ballroom. Christopher Amott temporarily re-joined the band for the remainder of the tour, while guitarist Jeff Loomis (formerly of Nevermore) was announced as the official replacement and joined the band for their European tour with Kreator and subsequent events.

On 22 January 2016, the founding members of Arch Enemy formed a side project named Black Earth. Consisting of former members Liiva and Christopher Amott and current members Daniel Erlandsson, Michael Amott, and Sharlee D'Angelo, the band played a sold-out Japan tour in May 2016. To celebrate the 20th anniversary of Arch Enemy and the release of their debut album, Black Earth, they only performed songs from the band's first three albums.

=== Will to Power (2016–2019) ===
On 26 August 2016, it was announced that Arch Enemy was working on their tenth studio album, which would be released in 2017. On 22 May 2017, the band revealed that the album would be titled Will to Power, to be released on 8 September 2017 by Century Media Records.

The first single, "The World Is Yours", was released on 14 July 2017, along with a music video that gained more than 1.1 million views on YouTube in the first two days.

On 2 August 2017, the band announced a co-headlining North American tour with Trivium in fall 2017 with While She Sleeps and Fit for an Autopsy as support acts.

In an October 2018 interview, Michael Amott announced that he was "writing a little bit here and there" and had "a few new ideas" for the next Arch Enemy album.

On 18 January 2019, Arch Enemy released Covered in Blood, a compilation album of songs covered over the years.

=== European tour, Deceivers, and Loomis' departure (2020–2023) ===
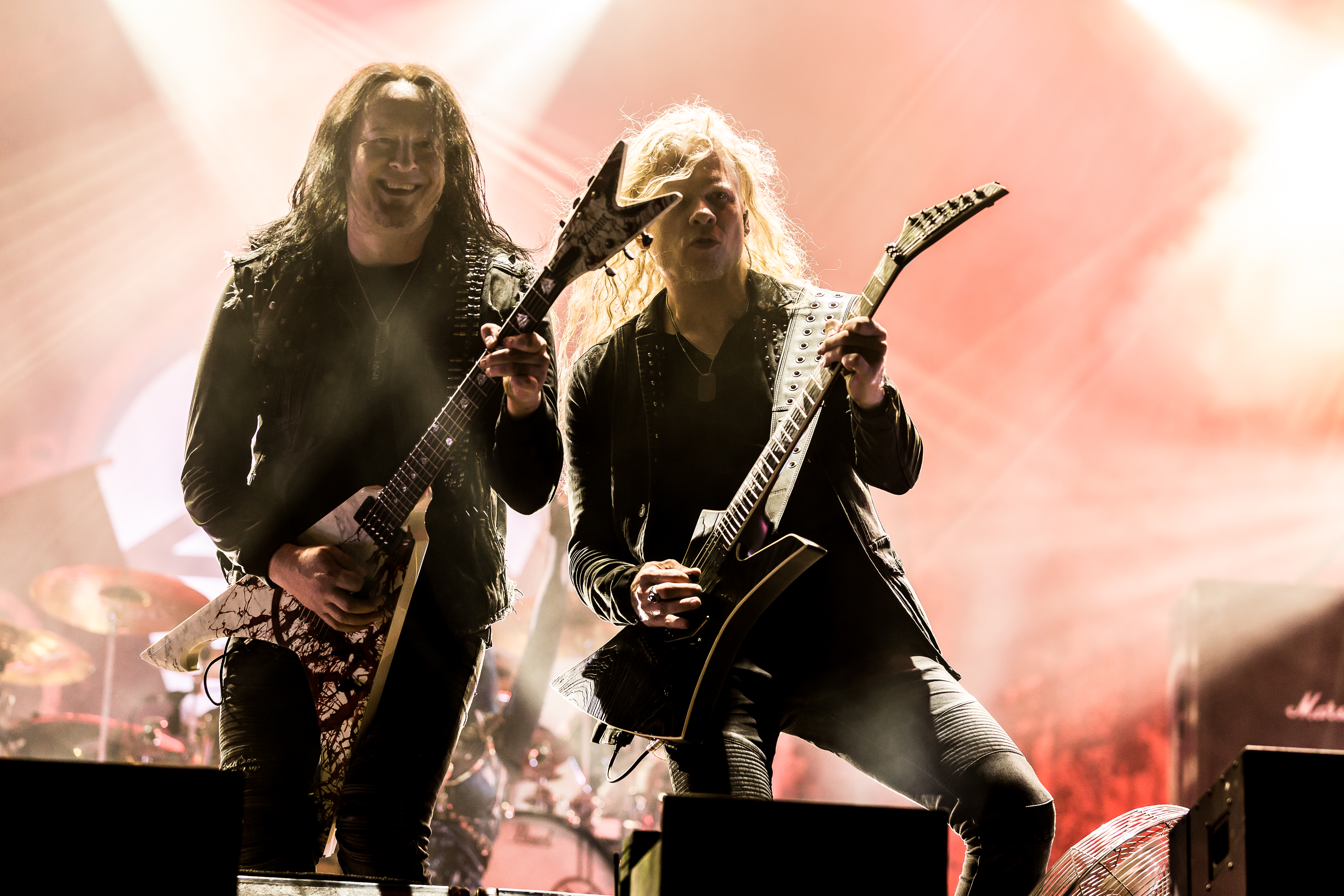
Arch Enemy performing live at Rockharz in 2023

On 30 November 2020, Arch Enemy announced their participation in the European Siege Tour 2021 with Behemoth, Carcass and Unto Others (later postponed to 2022). On 21 October 2021, Arch Enemy premiered the music video for the single "Deceiver, Deceiver". On 9 December 2021, they released a music video for another single, "House of Mirrors". On 27 January 2022, Arch Enemy announced their eleventh album, Deceivers, released on 12 August 2022 (originally announced for 29 July 2022, but later postponed). Along with the album announcement came the third single "Handshake with Hell", with yet another music video. Loudwire's listed the song as "best metal/rock song" of 2022, after "We'll Be Back" by Megadeth. On 22 April 2022, the band announced the fourth single from the album, "Sunset over the Empire", released on 20 May 2022, digitally and as a limited 7" vinyl with B-side "The Judging Eyes", an instrumental remake of "You Will Know My Name" from 2014’s War Eternal. On 11 July 2022, the fifth single was announced, "In the Eye of the Storm", out on 14 July 2022.

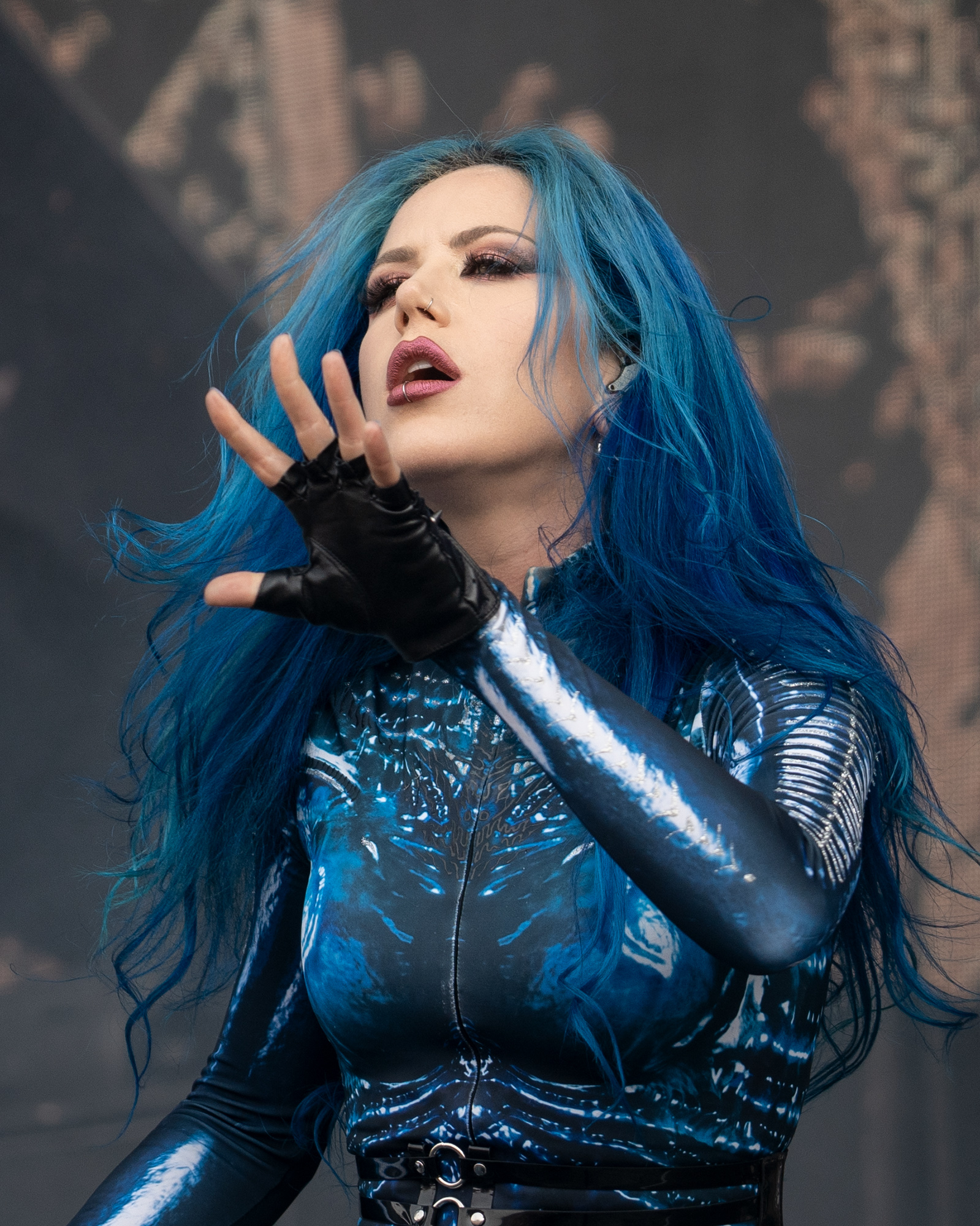
Frontwoman Alissa White-Gluz at Hellfest in 2023

The band toured throughout 2023. On 30 December 2023, Loomis left Arch Enemy on good terms to "enter a new chapter in [his] life." Joey Concepcion, who had previously filled in for Loomis for Arch Enemy's shows at Summer Breeze Open Air and Elbriot in 2018, was announced as his replacement. Concepcion's first tour with the band was the Deceivers Asia Tour, which took place in April and May 2024, and was the final tour of the Deceivers album cycle.

=== Blood Dynasty and White-Gluz's departure (2024–present) ===
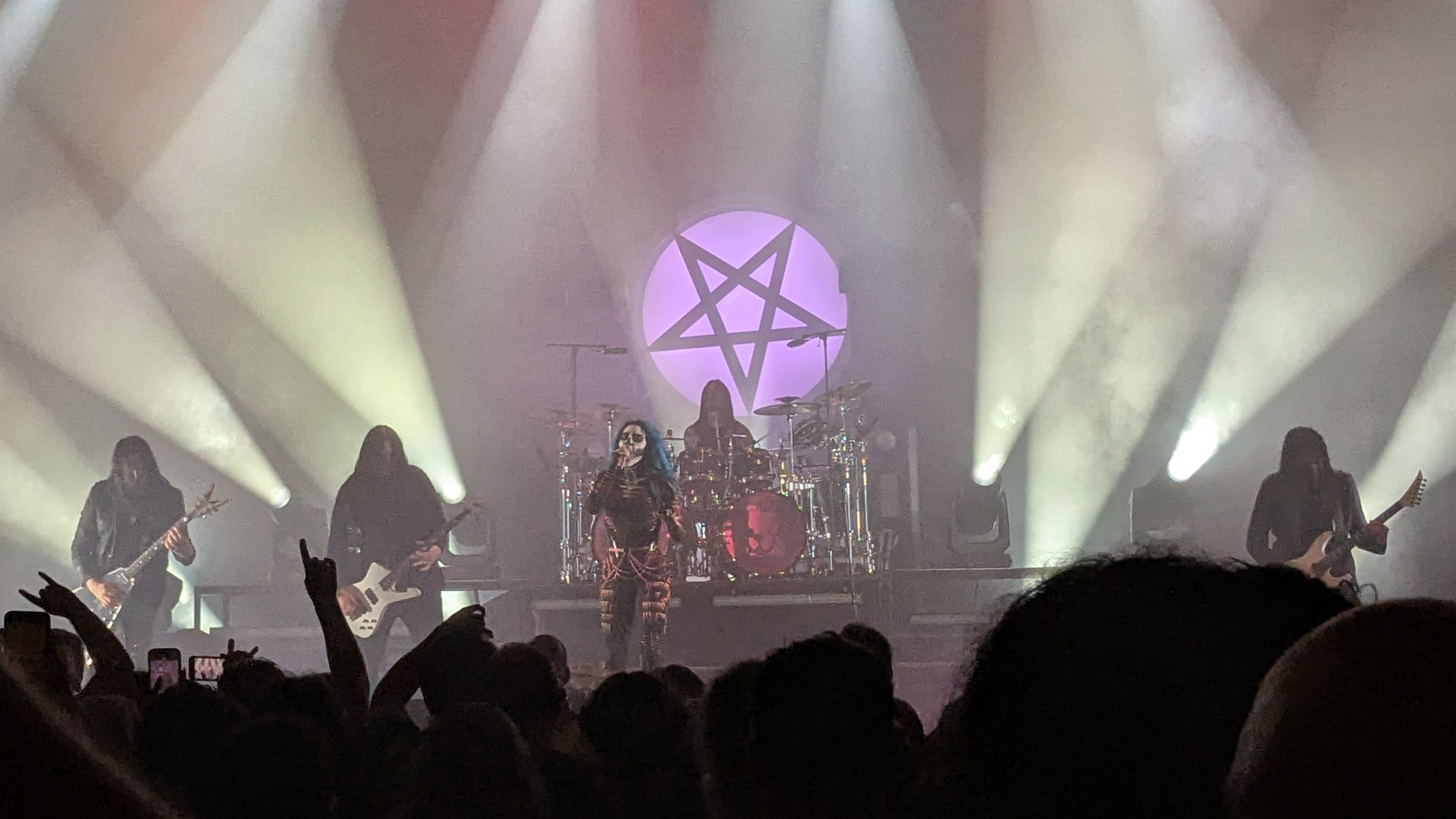
Arch Enemy performing live in Manchester in 2025

On 31 July 2024, Arch Enemy surprised fans with an unannounced single and music video for "Dream Stealer", the first new track since the Deceivers album in 2022. On 4 October 2024, the band announced that their twelfth album, Blood Dynasty, would be released on 28 March 2025. The album's second single, "Liars & Thieves", debuted on the Rising from the North tour, and was released with an official music video on 17 October. A third single, "Blood Dynasty", was announced on 27 November 2024 with a release scheduled for one week later.

One week after the Rising from the North tour, Arch Enemy embarked on their Largo Camino Al Inframundo... tour, performing 18 shows across Mexico. This was the second tour of the Blood Dynasty album cycle, and the most extensive Mexican tour of their career.

On 25 November 2024, it was announced that Arch Enemy would headline the European Blood Dynasty 2025 Tour in October and November 2025, with support acts Amorphis, Eluveitie and Gatecreeper.

On 18 December 2024, it was announced that Arch Enemy would headline the North American Blood Dynasty tour in April and May 2025, with support acts Fit for an Autopsy, Baest and Thrown into Exile. This tour included an appearance at Milwaukee Metal Fest.

On 23 November 2025, the band announced the departure of vocalist Alissa White-Gluz. On 19 February 2026, Arch Enemy released a new single, "To the Last Breath", introducing Lauren Hart, formerly of Once Human, as their new lead vocalist. They are scheduled to tour in 2026.

== Musical style ==
Arch Enemy's musical style has been classified as melodic death metal. AllMusic critic Steve Huey described the band's sound as a "blend of progressive and death metal influences." Earlier albums, such as Burning Bridges, while still classified as melodic death metal, are more centered around classic death metal. Invisible Oranges described the band's sound as "sort of a watered-down version" of Carcass's 1993 album Heartwork.

== Band members ==
Current

- Michael Amott − guitars, backing vocals (1995–present), bass (1995–1997, 1998)
- Daniel Erlandsson − drums, keyboards (1995–1997, 1998–present)
- Sharlee D'Angelo − bass (1999–present)
- Joey Concepcion − guitars, backing vocals (2023–present; substitute 2018)
- Lauren Hart − lead vocals (2026−present)

== Discography ==
- Black Earth (1996)
- Stigmata (1998)
- Burning Bridges (1999)
- Wages of Sin (2001)
- Anthems of Rebellion (2003)
- Doomsday Machine (2005)
- Rise of the Tyrant (2007)
- Khaos Legions (2011)
- War Eternal (2014)
- Will to Power (2017)
- Deceivers (2022)
- Blood Dynasty (2025)
