= Witchburner =

EP by Witchery
- Released: 29 March 1999
- Recorded: Los Angered Recordings, April 1997
- Genre: Thrash metal
- Length: 25:21
- Label: Necropolis/Rough Trade
- Producer: Witchery

Witchery chronology
Restless & Dead (1998)	Witchburner (1999)	Dead, Hot and Ready (1999)

Professional ratings
Review scores
Source	Rating
Allmusic	3.5/5 stars

Witchburner is an EP from Swedish heavy metal supergroup Witchery, released in 1999. The track listing consists of four cover songs, followed by three original songs.

== Track listing ==
1. "Fast as a Shark" (Accept) – 4:34
  - Originally released on the Restless and Wild album; written by Hoffman, Kaufmann, Dirkschneider, Baltes.
2. "I Wanna Be Somebody" (W.A.S.P.) – 3:14
  - Originally released on the W.A.S.P. album; written by Blackie Lawless
3. "Riding on the Wind" (Judas Priest) – 2:49
  - Originally released on the Screaming for Vengeance album; written by Glenn Tipton, Rob Halford, K.K. Downing
4. "Neon Knights" (Black Sabbath) – 3:53
  - Originally released on the Heaven and Hell album; music: Butler, Dio, Iommi, Ward; lyrics: Ronnie James Dio)
5. The Howling – 3:24
6. The Executioner – 3:16
7. Witchburner – 4:11

== Personnel ==
- Toxine – vocals
- Jensen – riff guitar
- Richard Corpse – solo guitars
- Sharlee D'Angelo – bass guitar
- Mique – drums
- Andy LaRocque – engineer
