= Dead Eyes See No Future =

EP by Arch Enemy
- Released: 2 November 2004
- Genre: Melodic death metal
- Length: 30:20
- Label: Century Media
- Producer: Andy Sneap

Arch Enemy chronology
| Anthems of Rebellion (2003) | Dead Eyes See No Future (2004) | Doomsday Machine (2005) |

Professional ratings
Review scores
| Source | Rating |
|---|---|
| AllMusic | 2.5/5 stars |

Dead Eyes See No Future is the second EP by Swedish melodic death metal band Arch Enemy. It was released on 2 November 2004 through Century Media Records.

The title track is taken from Arch Enemy's Anthems of Rebellion album.

"Burning Angel", "We Will Rise" and "Heart of Darkness" are live tracks from a concert at Elysée Montmartre in Paris on 27 February 2004. The studio versions of "Burning Angel" and "Heart of Darkness" can be found on Arch Enemy's Wages of Sin album. The studio version of "We Will Rise" is on the band's Anthems of Rebellion album.

"Symphony of Destruction" is a Megadeth cover, "Kill With Power" is a Manowar cover, and "Incarnated Solvent Abuse" is a Carcass cover.

The EP also features a video for "We Will Rise".

== Track listing ==
| No. | Title | Writer(s) | Length |
|---|---|---|---|
| 1. | "Dead Eyes See No Future" | Michael Amott, Christopher Amott, Angela Gossow | 4:17 |
| 2. | "Burning Angel" (Live at Elysée Montmartre in Paris, 27 February 2004) | Amott, Amott | 4:46 |
| 3. | "We Will Rise" (Live at Elysée Montmartre in Paris, 27 February 2004) | Amott, Amott | 4:15 |
| 4. | "Heart of Darkness" (Live at Elysée Montmartre in Paris, 27 February 2004) | Amott, Amott | 4:52 |
| 5. | "Symphony of Destruction" (Megadeth cover) | Dave Mustaine | 4:02 |
| 6. | "Kill With Power" (Manowar cover) | Joey DeMaio | 4:02 |
| 7. | "Incarnated Solvent Abuse" (Carcass cover) | Michael Amott, Bill Steer | 3:30 |
| 8. | "We Will Rise" (Video) | Amott, Amott | 7:07 |
| Total length: | | | 36:51 |

== Personnel ==
- Angela Gossow – Vocals
- Christopher Amott – Guitar
- Michael Amott – Guitar, Artwork
- Sharlee D'Angelo – Bass
- Daniel Erlandsson – Drums
- Per Wiberg – Keyboards
- Simon Ainge – Compilation, Enhanced CD Audio Creation
- Arch Enemy – Photography
- Rickard Bengtsson – Producer, Engineer
- George Bravo – Director
- Paul Harries – Photography
- Nick Mallinson – Assistant
- Masa Noda – Photography
- Andy Sneap – Producer, Engineer, Mixing
