= Restless & Dead =

Studio album by Witchery
- Released: 2 October 1998
- Recorded: January 1998
- Genre: Thrash metal
- Length: 35:44
- Label: Necropolis Records
- Producer: Witchery

Witchery chronology
Restless & Dead (1998)	Witchburner (1999)

Professional ratings
Review scores
Source	Rating
Allmusic	4.0/5 stars
The Metal Crypt	5/5 stars

Restless & Dead is the first album by the Swedish thrash metal band Witchery. Released in 1998 on Necropolis Records, the album features members of the band Satanic Slaughter. The title is a play on the Accept album Restless and Wild.

== Background ==
In 1997, the cult Swedish thrash metal band Satanic Slaughter split up, leaving only the vocalist Ztephan Dark. The other members of the band formed Witchery, along with Sharlee D'Angelo (Arch Enemy, Mercyful Fate) on bass guitar. Restless And Dead was their first studio album released under the Witchery name and was recorded in a week in Blue Hill Studios, Linköping, Sweden.

The album is in the style of thrash metal, though with some use of black metal and death metal aesthetics. These additions to the thrash metal template are less noticeable than in Satanic Slaughter and give the album a distinctive sound, that combination of styles being a rarity when the album was recorded.

This album introduces the distinctive Witchery "W", a sign that the band mascot Ben Wrangle shows on the front cover and also on the CD itself. The "W" is a misappropriation of the "devil horns" hand gesture invented by Ronnie James Dio while the vocalist with Black Sabbath.

== Track listing ==
All music and lyrics written by Jensen unless otherwise stated.

1. "The Reaper" - 2:19 (lyrics by Toxine)
2. "Witchery" - 3:06
3. "Midnight at the Graveyard" - 3:32 (music by Jensen/Toxine)
4. "The Hangman" - 4:00
5. "Awaiting the Exorcist" - 3:18 (music by Jensen/Corpse)
6. "All Evil"- 3:21 (music by Jensen/Corpse)
7. "The House of Raining Blood" - 3:46 (lyrics by Jensen/D'Angelo)
8. "Into Purgatory" - 4:05
9. "Born in the Night" - 5:11 (music by Jensen/Corpse)
10. "Restless and Dead" - 3:03

== Personnel ==
- Toxine - vocals
- Richard Corpse - guitar
- Mique - drums
- Jensen - guitar
- Sharlee D'Angelo - bass guitar
- Johan Larsson and Andreas Deblén - additional vocals
- Engineered by Gunnar Jangbrand and Janne Karlsson
- Mastered by Göran Finnberg at the Mastering Room
- Produced by Witchery
