= Symphony for the Devil =

Symphony for the Devil may refer to:

- Symphony for the Devil (Type O Negative album), a live DVD by Type O Negative
- Symphony for the Devil (Witchery album), a studio album by Witchery
