= Nespithe =

Studio album by Demilich
- Released: February 8, 1993
- Recorded: December 26–31, 1992, at Savonlinna, Finland
- Genres: Technical death metal; avant-garde metal
- Length: 39:03
- Label: Necropolis
- Producer: Tuomo Valtonen

Alternative cover
- 1996 European release cover

Nespithe is the only album recorded by Finnish death metal band Demilich. Originally issued by Necropolis Records in 1993, it was reissued in 1996 for the European market by Repulse Records and in 2003 by Century Media. The reissued version includes The Four Instructive Tales... of Decomposition demo and new artwork.

A remastered edition of the album was released in 2009 on both CD and vinyl by Xtreem Music. This version, unlike the previous Necropolis Records and Century Media releases, is approved by the band. The definitive reissue of the album is considered to be the 20th anniversary edition released by Svart Records.

The album title, "Nespithe", is the anagram of "The Spine", constructed by reversing order of three-letter groups from the end of the word. The track title "Erecshyrinol", meaning "No Lyrics Here" was constructed using the same algorithm.

Metal Injection said: "If you've never heard Nespithe, prepare to be transported to a psychedelic hellscape where words are belched out as poisonous clouds."

In 2016, music website No Echo included Nespithe in a feature called "1993: The Year of Death Metal Albums With Killer Groove Parts."

Professional ratings
Review scores
Source	Rating
Pitchfork	8.0/10 stars

== Track listing ==
Original track listing

- All lyrics by Antti Boman. Music by Demilich. Arranged by Demilich.
1. "When the Sun Drank the Weight of Water" – 3:43
2. "The Sixteenth Six-Tooth Son of Fourteen Four-Regional Dimensions (Still Unnamed)" – 3:29
3. "Inherited Bowel Levitation - Reduced Without Any Effort" – 3:22
4. "The Echo (Replacement)" – 4:27
5. "The Putrefying Road in the Nineteenth Extremity (...Somewhere Inside the Bowels of Endlessness...)" – 2:40
6. "(Within) The Chamber of Whispering Eyes" – 4:12
7. "And You'll Remain... (In Pieces in Nothingness)" – 3:12
8. "Erecshyrinol" – 3:17
9. "The Planet That Once Used to Absorb Flesh in Order to Achieve Divinity and Immortality (Suffocated to the Flesh That It Desired...)" – 3:17
10. "The Cry" – 3:42
11. "Raped Embalmed Beauty Sleep" – 3:42

Reissued track listing

1. "When the Sun Drank the Weight of Water"
2. "The Sixteenth Six-Tooth Son of Fourteen Four-Regional Dimensions..."
3. "Inherited Bowel Levitation - Reduced Without Any Effort"
4. "The Echo (Replacement)"
5. "The Putrefying Road in the Nineteenth Extremity (...Somewhere Inside the Bowels of Endlessness...)"
6. "(Within) The Chamber of Whispering Eyes"
7. "And You'll Remain... (In Pieces in Nothingness)"
8. "Erecshyrinol"
9. "The Planet That Once Used to Absorb Flesh in Order to Achieve Divinity and Immortality (Suffocated to the Flesh That It Desired...)"
10. "The Cry"
11. "Raped Embalmed Beauty Sleep"
12. "Introduction (Embalmed Beauty Sleep)"
13. "Two Independent Organisms → One Suppurating Deformity"
14. "And the Slimy Flying Creatures Reproduce in Your Brains"
15. "The Uncontrollable Regret of the Rotting Flesh"

== Personnel ==
Demilich

- Antti Boman - vocals, guitars
- Aki Hytönen - guitars
- Ville Koistinen - bass
- Mikko Virnes - drums

Additional personnel

- Turkka G. Rantanen - Cover art, Photography
- Tuomo Valtonen - Recording, Mixing, Engineering
- Antti Boman - Logo art
- Stilgu - Photography
- Luxi - Photography
