= Symphony for the Devil (Witchery album) =

Symphony For The Devil

Studio album by Witchery
- Released: 24 September 2001
- Recorded: Berno Studio, Sweden, February 2001
- Genre: Thrash metal
- Length: 46:49
- Label: Original release Necropolis; Reissue Music For Nations/Sony BMG
- Producer: Witchery and Berno Paulson

Witchery chronology
Dead, Hot And Ready (1999)	Symphony For The Devil (2001)	Don't Fear the Reaper (2006)

Professional ratings
Review scores
Source	Rating
Allmusic	4.5/5 stars

Symphony For The Devil is Witchery's third full-length studio album after Restless & Dead in 1998 and Dead, Hot And Ready in 1999. It was released in 2001 and has received underground acclaim from metal fanzines and webzines. The album continues in Witchery's previous style, with thrash metal riffing and solos, but with a black and death metal influence. This album has Martin Axe of Opeth on drums, after the departure of Mique. The 2001 Japan version, and 2007 reissues use alternate cover art.

== Musical influences ==
Since most of the music and lyrics on the album are written by Jensen, much of the album is similar in sound to his main band, The Haunted. This involves fast paced thrash riffing with melodic solos in most of the songs, though there is very little evidence of the Gothenburg sound in Symphony For The Devil unlike The Haunted. Jensen (guitar), Toxine (vocals) and Axe (drums) all previously played in Satanic Slaughter and Toxine, Jensen and Richard Corpse (guitar) were in Seance. Only Sharlee D'Angelo, bass guitarist with Arch Enemy, had no previous experience with the other band members.

Given each musician's other projects, the tight and attacking sound of Symphony For The Devil is unsurprising. The lyrics include topics such as black magic, death and the occult, similar to the themes in Witchery's first three albums and also those of Satanic Slaughter and Seance.

== Track listing ==
All music and lyrics written by Jensen unless otherwise stated.

1. "The Storm" - 3:34
2. "Unholy Wars" - 3:12 (music by Jensen/Corpse)
3. "Inquisition" - 3:57
4. "Omens" - 4:30
5. "Bone Mill" - 2:41
6. "None Buried Deeper..." - 3:58
7. "Wicked" - 2:59
8. "Called for by Death" - 4:58
9. "Hearse of the Pharoahs" - 5:07
10. "Shallow Grave" - 4:24 (music by Jensen/Corpse)
11. "Enshrined" * - 4:15 (music by Jensen/Corpse, lyrics by D'Angelo/Toxine)
12. "The One Within" * - 3:14 (music by Jensen/Toxine, lyrics by D'Angelo/Toxine)

Tracks marked with a * do not appear on all versions

The Japanese edition (TFCK-87249) contains the same tracks but "Enshrined" is track 6, "None Buried Deeper..." is track 7, "Wicked" is track 8, "Called For By Death" is track 9, "The One Within" is track 10, "Hearse Of The Pharoahs" is track 11 and "Shallow Grave" is track 12.

== Personnel ==
- Toxine - vocals
- Jensen - riff guitar
- Richard Corpse - solo guitar
- Sharlee D'Angelo - bass guitar
- Martin Axe - drums
