= Dead, Hot and Ready =

Studio album by Witchery
- Released: 22 October 1999
- Recorded: June and December 1998
- Studio: Blue Hill Studios, Linköping, Sweden
- Genre: Thrash metal
- Length: 33:33
- Label: Original release Necropolis; Reissue Music For Nations/Sony BMG

Witchery chronology
Restless & Dead (1998)	Dead, Hot and Ready (1999)	Symphony for the Devil (2001)

Professional ratings
Review scores
Source	Rating
Allmusic	2/5 stars

Dead, Hot and Ready is the second full-length album by the Swedish heavy metal supergroup Witchery. Released in 1999, it was the last Witchery album with Mique on drums.

The album was called "fast-paced thrash with all the glorious, fun occult references you can handle" in a 2011 review by the Metalsucks website.

== Track listing ==
All music by Jensen except where noted; all lyrics by Jensen.

1. Demonication - 2:31
2. A Paler Shade of Death - 3:11
3. The Guillotine - 2:38
4. Resurrection - 4:49 (music by Jensen/Corpse)
5. Full Moon - 3:46 (music by Jensen/D'Angelo)
6. The Devil and the Damage Done - 3:52
7. Dead, Hot and Ready - 2:43
8. The Devil's Triangle - 2:36
9. Call of the Coven - 3:47 (music by Jensen/Corpse)
10. On a Black Horse Thru Hell... - 3:40

== Personnel ==
- Toxine – vocals
- Jensen – guitars
- Richard Corpse – solos and guitars
- Sharlee D'Angelo – electric bass guitar, last guitar solo on "The Devil and the Damage Done"
- Mique – drums
