= Seance (band) =

Swedish death metal band

- Origin: Linköping, Sweden
- Genre: Death metal
- Years active: 1990–1998; 2008–present
- Labels: Black Mark, Pulverised Records
- Members: Johan Larsson; Tony Toxine Vargfrost; Tomas Hubbe Andersson; Mique Flesh
- Past members: Bino Carlsson; Richard Corpse; Patrik Jensen
- Website: Seance on Myspace

Seance is a Swedish death metal band formed in March 1990 when two Linköping bands, Orchriste and Total Death, fused. They split up after two albums in 1998. Most members were involved in the bands Satanic Slaughter and Witchery. Patrik Jensen later joined The Haunted. They reunited in early 2008 and released a 2009 album, Awakening of the Gods, through Pulverised Records.

Eduardio Rivadavia of AllMusic described Senace as "a textbook 1990's death metal band."

== Members ==
Line-up

- Johan Larsson – vocals, (1990-1998, 2008-present), bass (1995-1998, 2008-present)
- Tony Toxine Vargfrost – rhythm guitar (1990-1998, 2008-present)
- Micke Pettersson (aka Mique Flesh) – drums (1990-1998, 2008-present)
- Tomas Andersson - lead guitar (2013-present)

Former members

- Bino Carlsson – bass (1990-1995)
- Patrik Jensen – lead guitar (1990-1995)
- Rille (aka Richard Corpse) – lead guitar (1995-1998, 2008-2013)

Timeline

== Discography ==
- Levitised Spirit (Demo, 1991)
- Fornever Laid to Rest (1992)
- Saltrubbed Eyes (1993)
- Awakening of the Gods (2009)
