= Khaos Legions =

Studio album by Arch Enemy
- Released: 30 May 2011
- Recorded: December 2010 – March 2011
- Studio: Sweetspot Studio (Halmstad, Sweden); Studio Landgren 5.3 (Halmstad, Sweden)
- Genre: Melodic death metal
- Length: 54:55
- Label: Century Media
- Producer: Arch Enemy, Rickard Bengtsson

Arch Enemy chronology
The Root of All Evil (2009)	Khaos Legions (2011)	War Eternal (2014)

Singles from Khaos Legions
- 1. "Yesterday Is Dead and Gone" Released: 22 April 2011; 2. "Bloodstained Cross" Released: 25 August 2011; 3. "Under Black Flags We March" Released: 29 April 2012; 4. "Cruelty Without Beauty" Released: 25 September 2012

Professional ratings
Aggregate scores
Source	Rating
Metacritic	70/100
Review scores
Source	Rating
AllMusic	3.5/5 stars
Jukebox:Metal	5/5 stars
Metalholic	9/10
Thrash Hits	3.5/6 stars
Thrash Magazine	8.1/10

Khaos Legions is the eighth studio album by Swedish melodic death metal band Arch Enemy. It was released on May 30, 2011, by Century Media. The record marks a return to new, original material, after releasing the Tyrants of the Rising Sun - Live in Japan live CD/DVD (2008) and The Root of All Evil (2009) which consisted of a selection of re-recorded songs from the band's back catalog. It is the band's ninth album counting the compilation.

Khaos Legions debuted at number 78 on the Billboard 200, selling around 6,000 copies. This surpasses both Doomsday Machine and Rise of the Tyrant, making it the band's highest-charting effort so far.

The album's single is "Yesterday Is Dead and Gone", and music videos have been released for "Yesterday Is Dead and Gone", "Bloodstained Cross", "Under Black Flags We March" and "Cruelty Without Beauty". This would be the band's last album with founding member and guitarist Christopher Amott before he parted ways with the band for the second time in March 2012 to be replaced by former Arsis guitarist Nick Cordle. It is also the last album with singer Angela Gossow before she stepped down as vocalist in March 2014 to be succeeded by the Agonist singer Alissa White-Gluz, and Gossow switched to be the band's business manager.

== Background and development ==
The album was produced by Arch Enemy and Rickard Bengtsson, who had previously worked with the band on their 2005 album Doomsday Machine. Recording sessions took place at the Sweet Spot Studio in Sweden. The mix was done by Andy Sneap in Derbyshire, England.

Drummer Daniel Erlandsson said about the album:

We had a very inspiring and creative time writing this album. I think this is definitely evident when listening to the new songs. There's tons of variation in the material, ranging all the way from very melodic to extremely heavy.

As you can expect there's no shortage of killer riffs and intricate guitar work; the Amott brothers [Michael and Chris] have come up with some very cool yet demanding ideas!

This album has some of the fastest songs I've ever recorded, along with a bunch of heavy pounding mid-tempo songs.

As always, it's difficult to describe music in words, but rest assured — this album will be one heavy fucker!

In January 2011, UK's Bonkers Entertainment caught up with the band at their headline show at the HMV Forum in London UK on November 27, 2010. This concert was the last stop on a three-year-long touring cycle for the "Rise Of The Tyrant" and "The Root Of All Evil" albums and in the interview the members of Arch Enemy discussed the upcoming recording of the new studio album, the song writing process and touring plans for 2011. During the conversation, the band also divulged the title of the new album to be "Khaos Legions".

This is the first (and only) Arch Enemy album to have lyrics written entirely by Angela Gossow, instead of a collaborative effort between her and Michael Amott. Lyrically the album focuses on various political and social themes like religion in the song "Bloodstained Cross", animal testing in "Cruelty Without Beauty" and anarchism in the songs "No Gods, No Masters" and "Under Black Flags We March" (the black flag is an anarchist symbol). Animal testing was also criticized in the video for the song "Cruelty Without Beauty" showing video footage from animal test laboratories.

== Release and concept ==
Behind-the-scenes footage from the recording sessions for "Khaos Legions" leaked onto the internet and can be seen at the band's YouTube channel. The CD was tracked at Sweet Spot Studio in the south of Sweden with engineer Rickard Bengtsson (who produced 2005's "Doomsday Machine") and is scheduled for a May release via Century Media Records. The band's drummer Daniel Erlandsson previously stated about the new CD, "We had a very inspiring and creative time writing this album. I think this is definitely evident when listening to the new songs. There's tons of variation in the material, ranging all the way from very melodic to extremely heavy."

In the band's second studio update, bassist Sharlee D'Angelo said: "Ladies and gentlemen, the low end is firmly in place! After a long day of plowing through an absolutely massive array of bass guitars, different amps and cabs, and various other electronic gadgets, the choice finally fell on my white custom shop Ibanez Iceman run through an MXR Bass D.I.+ and an Aguilar Tonehammer into an Aguilar DB751 head and a DB810 cab, complemented by a Marshall VBC 412 cab, hidden behind a veritable forest of expensive microphones on serious looking mic stands. And the result? F**king awesome, people! Our engineer Rickard Bengtsson is an audio nerd with a rock'n'roll backbone who does not give up until he finds what he's looking for – and thank f**k for that. Cause the songs on this album really need to be presented in the best way possible. Having laid down all the bass tracks now I just can't wait for everybody to hear the album, and to play all these songs live for you all! But we're not quite there yet, next up are blistering leads from the depths of hell"

=== Artwork ===
The artwork for this album was created by Brent Elliott White, and features a photo of the band cartooned in skeletons. According to Angela Gossow, it was inspired by Eugène Delacroix's Liberty Leading the People.

== Promotion ==
Arch Enemy had confirmed several 2011 summer dates and festivals in support of their album, including newly added performances on Sonisphere Festivals in Sweden, UK and Spain.

== Track listing ==
All lyrics are written by Angela Gossow; all music is composed by Michael Amott, Christopher Amott, Daniel Erlandsson, Sharlee D'Angelo

No.	Title	Length
1.	"Khaos Overture" (instrumental)	1:31
2.	"Yesterday Is Dead and Gone"	4:22
3.	"Bloodstained Cross"	4:49
4.	"Under Black Flags We March"	4:41
5.	"No Gods, No Masters"	4:14
6.	"City of the Dead"	4:31
7.	"Through the Eyes of a Raven"	5:09
8.	"Cruelty Without Beauty"	4:59
9.	"We Are a Godless Entity" (instrumental)	1:34
10.	"Cult of Chaos"	5:11
11.	"Thorns in My Flesh"	4:55
12.	"Turn to Dust" (instrumental)	0:39
13.	"Vengeance Is Mine"	4:09
14.	"Secrets"	4:05
Total length:		54:49

Japanese edition
No.	Title	Length
15.	"The Zoo" (Scorpions cover)	4:42
16.	"Snow Bound" (acoustic)	1:41
Total length:		1:01:12

Kovered in Khaos − 2xCD mediabook edition
No.	Title	Length
1.	"Warning" (Discharge cover)	2:45
2.	"Wings of Tomorrow" (Europe cover)	3:15
3.	"The Oath" (Kiss cover)	4:14
4.	"The Book of Heavy Metal" (Dream Evil cover)	4:17
Total length:		14:31

== Personnel ==
=== Band members ===
- Angela Gossow − vocals
- Michael Amott − guitars
- Christopher Amott − guitars
- Sharlee D'Angelo − bass
- Daniel Erlandsson − drums

=== Guest ===
- Per Wiberg − keyboards
- Mikkel Sandager − backing vocals (on track 4, 7, 11)

== Charts ==
=== Album charts ===
Chart (2011)	Peak Position
Austrian Albums Chart	37
Dutch Albums Chart	75
Finnish Albums Chart	9
French Album Chart	77
German Albums Chart	15
Japan Oricon International Chart	3
Spanish Albums Chart	61
Swiss Albums Chart	41
Swedish Albums Chart	25
UK Albums Chart	107
U.S. Billboard 200	78

== Release history ==
Region	Date	Label	Format
Japan	May 18, 2011	Trooper Entertainment	CD, digital download
Europe	May 30, 2011	Century Media Records	CD, 2-CD, 2-LP vinyl, digital download
US	June 7, 2011	Century Media Records	CD, 2-CD, digital download
