= W.A.S.P. (album) =

Studio album by W.A.S.P.
- Released: August 17, 1984
- Studio: Record Plant (Los Angeles)
- Genres: Heavy metal; glam metal
- Length: 38:14
- Label: Capitol
- Producers: Blackie Lawless, Mike Varney

W.A.S.P. chronology
W.A.S.P. (1984)	The Last Command (1985)

Singles from W.A.S.P.
- 1. "I Wanna Be Somebody" Released: August 1984; 2. "School Daze" Released: November 1984; 3. "L.O.V.E. Machine" Released: 1984 (Japan)

Professional ratings
Review scores
Source	Rating
AllMusic	3/5 stars
Collector's Guide to Heavy Metal	5/10
Metal Crypt	4.25/5 stars
Rock Hard	9.0/10

W.A.S.P. is the debut studio album by the American heavy metal band W.A.S.P., released on August 17, 1984. The album has been known under three different names; the spine of the original European vinyl release had Winged Assassins printed on it, while early cassette releases of the album had the name of the album's first track, "I Wanna Be Somebody", printed in bold letters on the cover. The album is officially entitled simply W.A.S.P., which it is typically referred to as. It was recorded in two and a half weeks at the Record Plant.

In 2018, Collin Brennan of Consequence included the album in his list of "10 Hair Metal Albums That Don’t Suck".

== Overview ==
Prior to its original release, the controversial track "Animal (Fuck Like a Beast)" was deleted from the album. The Parents Music Resource Center had labeled the song as one of its "Filthy 15", songs that the group determined to be morally objectionable. Capitol Records subsequently bowed to pressure and pulled the song. The band released it as a single in the UK in 1984 on the indie label Music for Nations, and the single subsequently became a highly sought after item in North America as an import. The 1998 reissue features the originally intended track list with the song reinstated.

The song "I Wanna Be Somebody", released as the album's second single with accompanying music video, was so popular that VH1 later placed it in their list of the "Top 100 Hard Rock Songs" of all time. "L.O.V.E. Machine" dates back to Lawless' pre-W.A.S.P. band Circus Circus, who frequently played the song live but never recorded it.

Several of the album's songs have been covered by other bands. "Sleeping (In the Fire)" has been covered by Tiamat and Anders Manga; "Hellion" by Children of Bodom and In Aeternum; "L.O.V.E. Machine" by Fallen Man, Lullacry, Fozzy, and Alghazanth; "I Wanna Be Somebody" by Sentenced, Catamenia, Witchery, Avulsed, and Gates of Ishtar; and "The Torture Never Stops" by the death metal group Torture Division.

The song "Tormentor" was heard in the films The Dungeonmaster (1984) and TerrorVision (1986).

== Track listings ==
All songs written by Blackie Lawless, except where noted.

Side one
No.	Title	Writer(s)	Length
1.	"I Wanna Be Somebody"		3:43
2.	"L.O.V.E. Machine"		3:51
3.	"The Flame"	Lawless, Chris Holmes, J. Marquez	3:41
4.	"B.A.D."		3:56
5.	"School Daze"		3:35

Side two
No.	Title	Writer(s)	Length
6.	"Hellion"		3:39
7.	"Sleeping (In the Fire)"		3:55
8.	"On Your Knees"		3:48
9.	"Tormentor"	Lawless, Holmes	4:10
10.	"The Torture Never Stops"		3:56

1998 CD reissue
No.	Title	Writer(s)	Length
1.	"Animal (Fuck Like a Beast)"		3:07
2.	"I Wanna Be Somebody"		3:43
3.	"L.O.V.E. Machine"		3:51
4.	"The Flame"	Lawless, Holmes, Marquez	3:41
5.	"B.A.D."		3:56
6.	"School Daze"		3:35
7.	"Hellion"		3:39
8.	"Sleeping (In the Fire)"		3:55
9.	"On Your Knees"		3:48
10.	"Tormentor"	Lawless, Holmes	4:10
11.	"The Torture Never Stops"		3:56
12.	"Show No Mercy ( b-side Animal )"		3:48
13.	"Paint It Black ( B-side 7", School Daze )" (The Rolling Stones cover)	Mick Jagger, Keith Richards	3:27
Total length:			48:36

== Personnel ==
W.A.S.P.

- Blackie Lawless – lead vocals, bass, producer
- Chris Holmes – lead & rhythm guitars
- Randy Piper – lead & rhythm guitars, backing vocals
- Tony Richards – drums, backing vocals

Production

- Mike Varney – producer
- Duane Baron – engineer, mixing
- Stephen M. Fontano – engineer
- Jim Scott, Hanspeter Huber – assistant engineers
- David Tarling – pre-production

== Charts ==
=== Album ===
Chart (1984)	Peak position
Canada Top Albums/CDs (RPM)	56
Finnish Albums (The Official Finnish Charts)	6
Swedish Albums (Sverigetopplistan)	15
UK Albums (Official Charts)	51
US Billboard 200	74

=== Singles ===
Year	Single	Chart	Position
1984	"Animal (Fuck Like a Beast)"	UK Singles Chart	83
1984	"I Wanna Be Somebody"	Finnish Singles Chart	18
1984	"I Wanna Be Somebody"	New Zealand Singles Chart	30
1984	"I Wanna Be Somebody"	UK Singles Chart	77
1984	"School Daze"	Finnish Singles Chart	14
1984	"School Daze"	UK Singles Chart	81

== Certifications ==
Region	Certification	Certified units/sales
Canada (Music Canada)	Gold	50,000^{^}
Finland (Musiikkituottajat)	Gold	20,000
Japan (RIAJ)	Gold	100,000^{^}
United States (RIAA)	Gold	500,000^{^}
^{^} Shipments figures based on certification alone.
