= Patrik Jensen =

Swedish guitarist (born 1969)

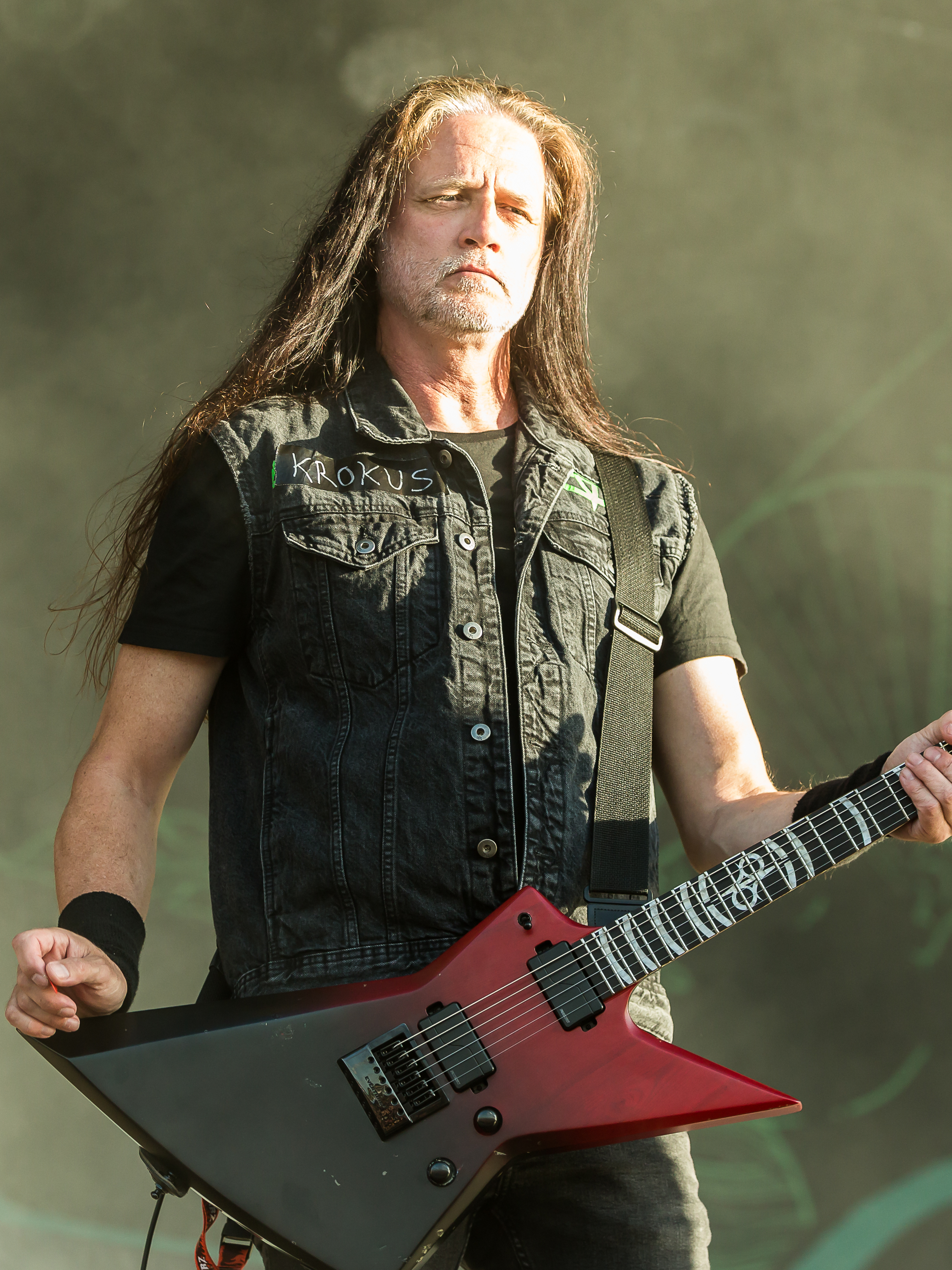
- Jensen with The Halo Effect in 2024

Background information
- Also known as: El Embrujado, Jensen
- Born: Patrik Niels Jensen; 24 November 1969 (age 56)
- Genres: Thrash metal, death metal, black metal
- Occupation: Guitarist
- Member of: The Haunted, Witchery
- Formerly of: Orchriste, Seance, Satanic Slaughter

Patrik Niels Jensen (born 24 November 1969) is a Swedish guitarist. He is a guitarist and founding member of the extreme metal bands The Haunted (1996–present) and Witchery (1997–present), and also a former guitarist for Orchriste (1987–1990), Seance (1990–1995) and Satanic Slaughter (1994–1996).

Jensen was raised in Edmonton, Canada until he was 10. He received his first guitar when he was seven years old, but started playing when he was sixteen years old – he took guitar lessons for five years thereafter. Jensen plays his signature E1.6 Jensen from Solar Guitars and uses Engl amplification and EMG pick-ups (85/81).

In 2013, Jensen played some live shows with In Flames for Niclas Engelin when Engelin was unable to play. As of 2021, Jensen serves as a part-time touring guitarist for The Halo Effect replacing Jesper Stromblad when he is unable to play due to ongoing illness. Jensen also played with Haunted bandmates in At The Gates at Wacken Open Air in 2022 following the departure of Jonas Stålhammar.

== Discography ==
=== Orchriste ===
- Necronomicon (1989)

=== Seance ===
- Levitised Spirit (1991)
- Fornever Laid to Rest (1992)
- Saltrubbed Eyes (1993) – lyrics, album cover

=== Satanic Slaughter ===
- Satanic Slaughter (1995)
- Land of the Unholy Souls (1996)

=== With The Haunted ===
- Demo '97 (1997)
- The Haunted (1998)
- Made Me Do It (2000)
- Live Rounds in Tokyo (2001)
- Caught on Tape (2002)
- One Kill Wonder (2003)
- Revolver (2004)
- The Dead Eye (2006)
- Versus (2008)
- Unseen (2011)
- Eye of the Storm (2014)
- Exit Wounds (2014)
- Strength in Numbers (2017)
- Songs of Last Resort (2025)

=== With Witchery ===
- Restless & Dead (1998)
- Witchburner EP (1999)
- Dead, Hot and Ready (1999) – mixing
- Symphony for the Devil (2001) – lyrics
- Don't Fear the Reaper (2006)
- Witchkrieg (2010) – lyrics
- In His Infernal Majesty's Service (2016)
- I Am Legion (2017)
- Nightside (2022)
