= In His Infernal Majesty's Service =

Studio album by Witchery
- Released: 25 November 2016
- Genre: Thrash metal, death metal
- Length: 37:46; 44:29 (bonus tracks)
- Label: Century Media
- Producer: Witchery

Witchery chronology
Witchkrieg (2010)	In His Infernal Majesty's Service (2016)	I Am Legion (2017)

Professional ratings
Review scores
Source	Rating
Angry Metal Guy	4/5 stars
Louder	3.5/5 stars
Broken Arrow	8.5/10 stars

In His Infernal Majesty's Service is the sixth full-length studio album by the Swedish thrash metal band Witchery and their third since signing with Century Media Records. The album was released on 25 November 2016.

This album is the first for vocalist Angus Norder and drummer Chris Barkensjö, replacing Emperor Magus Caligula and Martin Axenrot respectively.

== Track listing ==
All songs written by Patrik Jensen.

No.	Title	Length
1.	"Lavey-athan"	3:20
2.	"Zoroast"	2:34
3.	"Netherworld Emperor"	3:03
4.	"Nosferatu"	3:41
5.	"The Burning of Salem"	4:23
6.	"Gilded Fang"	2:31
7.	"Empty Tombs"	4:13
8.	"In Warm Blood"	3:48
9.	"Escape from Dunwich Valley"	4:09
10.	"Feed the Gun"	3:02
11.	"Oath Breaker"	3:02
12.	"Eye for an Eye" (Bonus Track)	3:48
13.	"Cloak and Dagger" (Bonus Track)	2:55
Total length:		37:46

The bonus tracks, "Eye for an Eye" and "Cloak and Dagger" are from the recording sessions for the previous album Witchkrieg.

== Charts ==
Chart (2016)	Peak position
US Heatseekers Albums (Billboard)	13

== Personnel ==
- Angus Norder – vocals
- Patrik Jensen – guitar
- Rille Rimfält – lead guitar
- Sharlee D'Angelo – bass
- Chris Barkensjö – drums, percussion
