= Skyline Whispers =

Studio album by The Night Flight Orchestra
- Released: 9 June 2015
- Recorded: 2014 at Nordic Sound Lab Studios, Skara, Sweden
- Genre: Classic rock, AOR, hard rock
- Length: 56:28
- Label: Coroner Records

The Night Flight Orchestra chronology
Internal Affairs (2012)	Skyline Whispers (2015)	Amber Galactic (2017)

Professional ratings
Review scores
Source	Rating
Thunder Underground	'fantastic'
Music and Festival Reviews	10/10
Nihil Verum Nisi Mors	4/5
Rocknroll Reporter	5/6
Artrock.se	9/10
Heavymetale.se	4/5
Rocknytt	10/10
Metal Wave	76/100
Dead Rhetoric	9/10

Skyline Whispers is the second studio album by Swedish rock band The Night Flight Orchestra, released on 9 June 2015 via Coroner Records.

== Track listing ==
No.	Title	Length
1.	"Sail On"	4:47
2.	"Living for the Nighttime"	6:00
3.	"Stiletto"	4:31
4.	"Owaranai Palisades"	1:13
5.	"Lady Jade"	4:13
6.	"I Ain't Old, I Ain't Young"	5:04
7.	"All the Ladies"	4:26
8.	"Spanish Ghosts"	4:54
9.	"Demon Princess"	4:54
10.	"Skyline Whispers"	2:23
11.	"Roads Less Traveled"	4:07
12.	"The Heather Reports"	9:56
Total length:		56:28

Digipak edition bonus track
No.	Title	Length
13.	"Floridian Eyes"	6:10

Japanese edition bonus track
No.	Title	Length
13.	"Floridian Eyes"	6:10
14.	"But You and I"
15.	"1998" (demo version)

== Credits ==
=== Personnel ===
The Night Flight Orchestra

- Björn "Speed" Strid – vocals
- David Andersson – guitar
- Sharlee D'Angelo – bass
- Richard Larsson – keyboards
- Jonas Källsbäck – drums
- Sebastian Forslund – congas, percussion, guitar

Production

- Bengan Andersson – engineering
- Sebastian Forslund – mixing
- Thomas "PLEC" Johansson – mastering

Notes

- Recorded at Nordic Sound Lab Studios in Skara, Sweden.
- Mastered at Panic Room Studios in Skara, Sweden.
