= Amber Galactic =

Studio album by The Night Flight Orchestra
- Released: 19 May 2017
- Recorded: 2016
- Studio: Handsome Hard Studio, Sweden
- Genre: AOR, hard rock
- Length: 50:07
- Label: Nuclear Blast

The Night Flight Orchestra chronology
Skyline Whispers (2015)	Amber Galactic (2017)	Sometimes the World Ain't Enough (2018)

Amber Galactic is the third studio album by Swedish rock band The Night Flight Orchestra, released on 19 May 2017 via Nuclear Blast. It was recorded at Handsome Hard Studios, Kävlinge, Sweden and Nordic Sound Lab, Skara, Sweden in 2016. Additional recordings were done at Studio Valborg, Studio Rymdberg, Speedstrid Studios and on a tour bus close to the Austrian border.

In March 2017 during a press conference, singer Björn Strid stated: "Amber Galactic was made during late nights and way too early mornings, when sometimes, in the corner of your eye, you can catch a glimpse of another dimension, where all the women are heartbroken space commanders in evening gowns, the champagne is always free and the drugs won't hurt you. We wanted to create more than just a listening experience, instead we want it to be an alternative reality. We hope that after listening to Amber Galactic, you'll be wide-eyed, horny and slightly drunk." Guitarist David Andersson added: "Musicianship in itself is not interesting, neither are the technical aspects of creating music. The ideas and visions behind the music are the only things really worthy of in-depth discussions. We've all reached a point where we can all pretty much play and sing whatever we want. We didn't talk much about chord changes or amplifiers during the recording sessions. But we spent a lot of time discussing Kierkegaard’s concept of anxiety, different vintages of sparkling wine, the psychoacoustic aspects of modulation, the innate superiority of women and why a pearl necklace always look better when whoever wears it has a bored expression on her face."

== Critical reception ==
Professional ratings
Review scores
Source	Rating
CounterCulture	95/100
Sentinel Daily	(favourable)
Rock Hard	8.5/10
Metal Hammer	(favourable)
Team Rock	3/5
KNAC	5/5
Metal Underground	4.5/5
Radio Metal	(favourable)
Metal.de	10/10
Power Metal	9.5/10

In May 2017, Amber Galactic was awarded album of the month by the publications Rock Hard, Rock Hard France, Sweden Rock, PowerMetal.de and United Rock Nations. Sentinel Daily called it "definite album of the year material", while Metal Hammer described its sound as "AOR and classical rock between a hail of mirror balls and swinging hooks!" Radio Metal wrote: "Prepare yourself a nice little sparkling bath, pour a glass of champagne and let yourself be embarked on a journey made of odes to intergalactic hostesses, and sing without restraint. Sometimes pleasure is no more complicated than that."

In December 2017, Amber Galactic was nominated for a Swedish Grammy Award in the category Best rock/Metal.

== Track listing ==
No.	Title	Length
1.	"Midnight Flyer"	6:07
2.	"Star of Rio"	4:34
3.	"Gemini"	4:18
4.	"Sad State of Affairs"	4:50
5.	"Jennie"	4:32
6.	"Domino"	5:01
7.	"Josephine"	4:41
8.	"Space Whisperer"	4:35
9.	"Something Mysterious"	4:10
10.	"Saturn in Velvet"	7:26
Total length:		50:07

Digipak edition bonus track
No.	Title	Length
11.	"Just Another Night (Mick Jagger Cover)"	4:53

Japanese edition bonus track
No.	Title	Length
12.	"Fly Tonight (Never Rewind)"

== Personnel ==
The Night Flight Orchestra

- Björn "Speed" Strid – vocals
- David Andersson – guitar
- Sharlee D'Angelo – bass
- Richard Larsson – keyboards, percussion
- Jonas Källsbäck – drums, percussion
- Sebastian Forslund – congas, percussion, guitar

Additional musicians

- Johanna Beijbom – backing vocals on "Star of Rio" and "Josephine"
- Martin Lindqvist – sax solo on "Just Another Night"
- Hanna Carlsson – cello

Special appearances

Giorgia Carteri, Kamila Kucharska, Lena Mischuk, Kenya Horst, Anna Berntman

== Charts ==
Chart (2017)	Peak position
Austrian Albums (Ö3 Austria)	64
Belgian Albums (Ultratop Wallonia)	165
German Albums (Offizielle Top 100)	43
Swiss Albums (Schweizer Hitparade)	54
