= Witchkrieg =

Studio album by Witchery
- Released: 21 June 2010
- Genre: Thrash metal, death metal
- Length: 34:20; 37:44 (digipack edition); 40:42 (Japan edition)
- Label: Century Media
- Producer: Witchery

Witchery chronology
Don't Fear the Reaper (2006)	Witchkrieg (2010)	In His Infernal Majesty's Service (2016)

Professional ratings
Review scores
Source	Rating
Allmusic	4/5 stars
Blabbermouth.net	8.5/10 stars

Witchkrieg is the fifth full-length studio album by the Swedish thrash metal band Witchery, released on 21 June 2010 in Europe and 29 June 2010 in North America. This album is their second on Century Media Records. Like their previous album, Don't Fear the Reaper, Witchkrieg was mixed by Tue Madsen at his Antfarm Studios. Witchkrieg showcases an impressive line-up of guest musicians such as Andy LaRocque from King Diamond, Kerry King from the thrash band Slayer, Hank Shermann of Mercyful Fate, Lee Altus and Gary Holt from Exodus and Jim Durkin from Dark Angel.

This is the first Witchery album without the long time vocalist Tony "Toxine" Kampner. His replacement is Erik "Legion" Hagstedt.

== Track listing ==
All songs written by Patrik Jensen.

No.	Title	Length
1.	"Witchkrieg" (Solo by guest Kerry King)	3:45
2.	"Wearer of Wolf's Skin"	2:27
3.	"The God Who Fell from Earth" (Solo by guest Hank Shermann)	4:39
4.	"Conqueror's Return"	3:25
5.	"The Reaver" (Solos by guests Gary Holt and Lee Altus)	3:17
6.	"From Dead to Worse" (Solo by guest Andy LaRocque)	3:34
7.	"Devil Rides Out"	4:11
8.	"One Foot in the Grave" (Solo by guest Jim Durkin)	2:58
9.	"Hellhound"	2:46
10.	"Witch Hunter"	3:28

Digipack content
No.	Title	Length
11.	"Hung, Drawn and Quartered"	3:14

Japan Version
No.	Title	Length
11.	"Cloak & Dagger"	2:56
12.	"Hung, Drawn and Quartered"	3:14

== Personnel ==
=== Witchery ===
- Erik "Legion" Hagstedt – vocals
- Patrik Jensen – guitars
- Rille Rimfält – guitars, guitar solos
- Sharlee D'Angelo – bass guitar
- Martin Axenrot – drums

=== Additional musicians ===
- Johan Larsson – additional vocals (tracks 3, 6, 7 & 8)

Guest lead guitars:

- Andy LaRocque
- Kerry King
- Hank Shermann
- Lee Altus
- Gary Holt
- Jim Durkin

== Production ==
- Mixed and mastered by Tue Madsen
