= The Night Flight Orchestra =

Swedish rock band

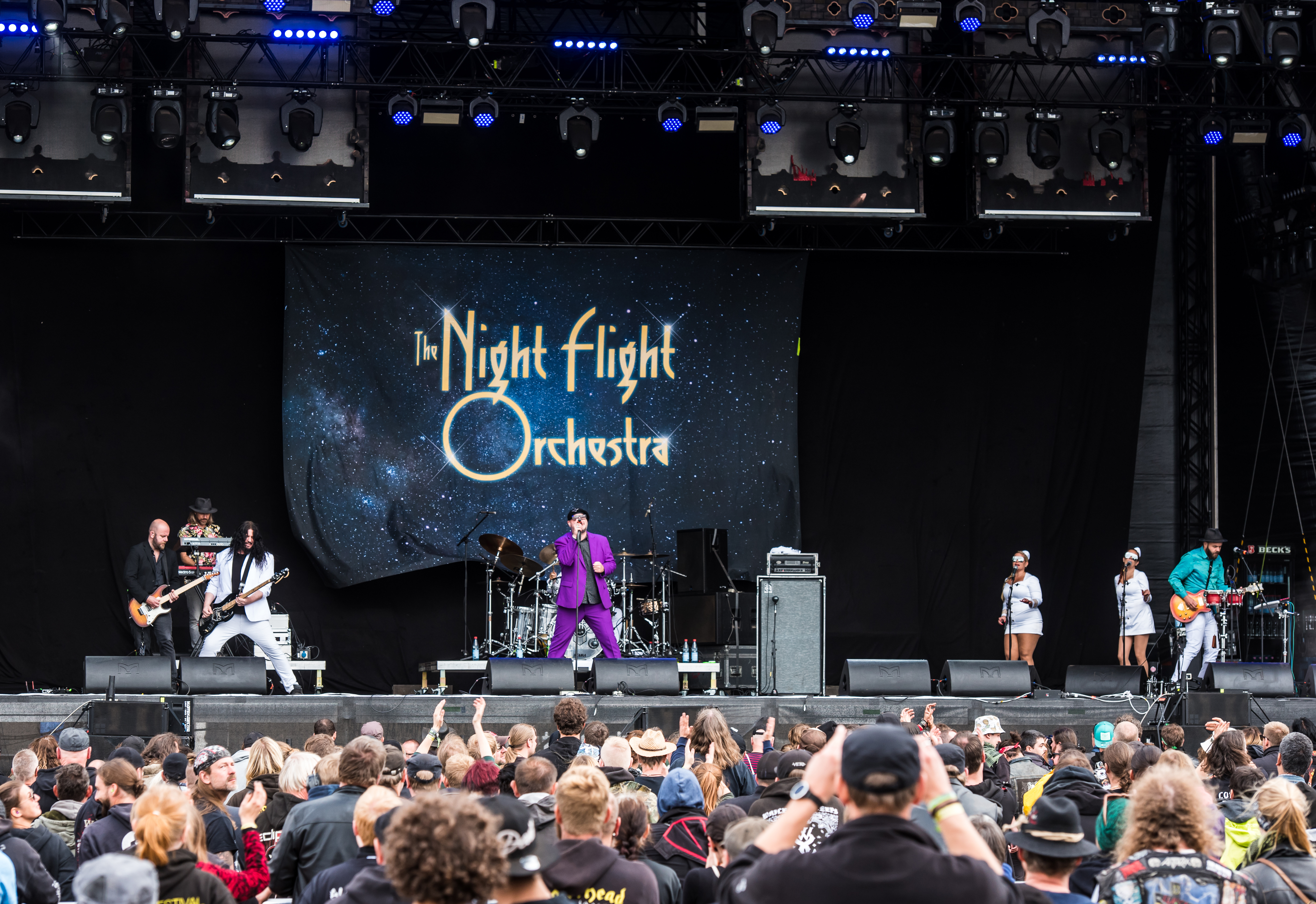
- The Night Flight Orchestra at Reload Festival 2018

Background information
- Origin: Helsingborg, Sweden
- Genres: AOR; classic rock; hard rock
- Years active: 2007−present
- Label: Nuclear Blast
- Members: Björn Strid; Sharlee D'Angelo; Jonas Källsbäck; Sebastian Forslund; Anna Brygård; John Lönnmyr; Rasmus Ehrnborn; Åsa Lundman
- Past members: David Andersson; Richard Larsson; Anna-Mia Bonde

The Night Flight Orchestra is a Swedish rock band from Helsingborg. Formed in 2007 by Björn Strid and David Andersson while they were touring in the US with their band Soilwork, they were later joined by bassist Sharlee D'Angelo (Arch Enemy, Spiritual Beggars, ex-Mercyful Fate), Richard Larsson (Von Benzo), Jonas Källsbäck (Mean Streak) and, more recently, Sebastian Forslund (Kadwatha). They have released seven studio albums.

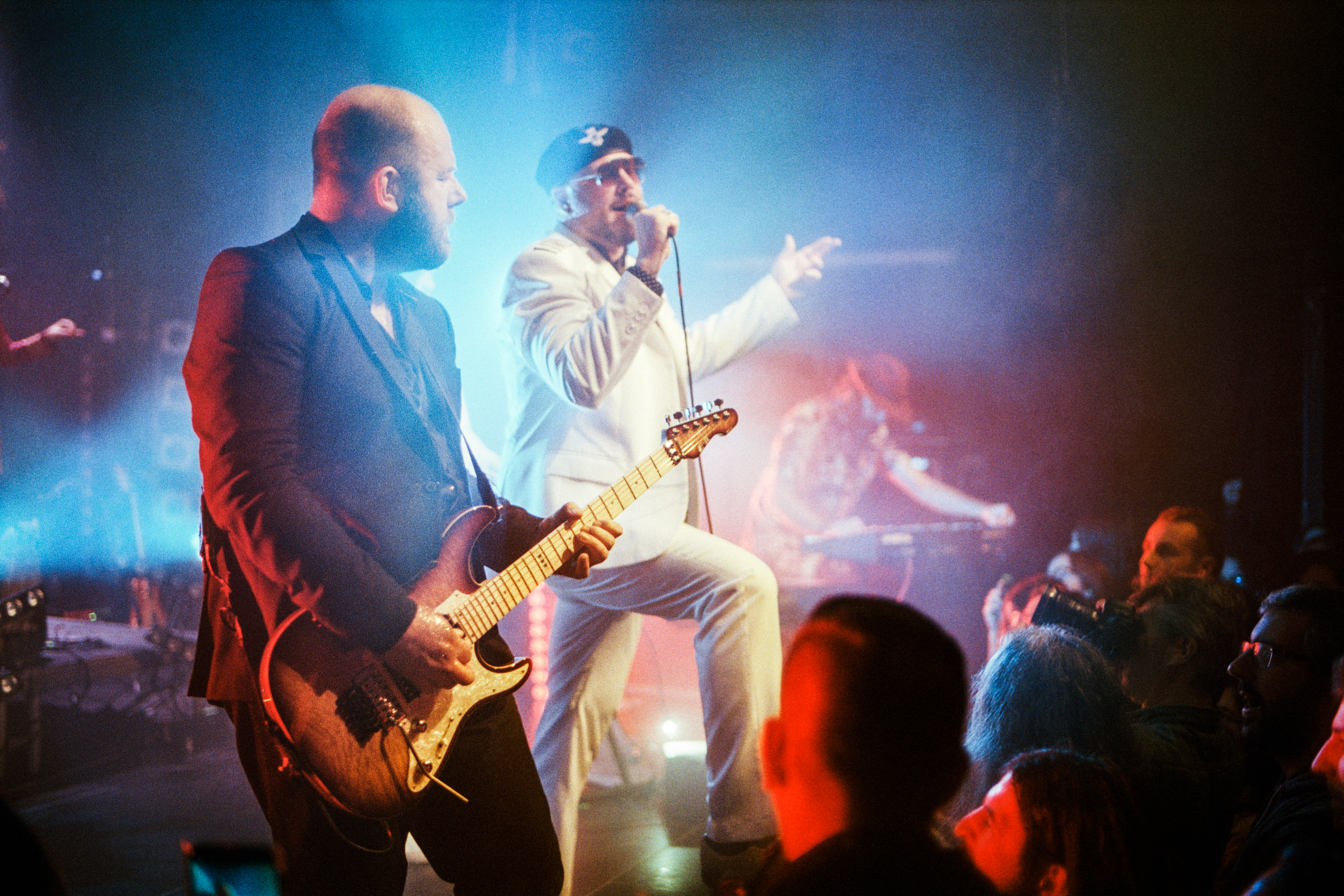
The Night Flight Orchestra on stage in Paris during the Sometimes The World Ain't Enough European tour.

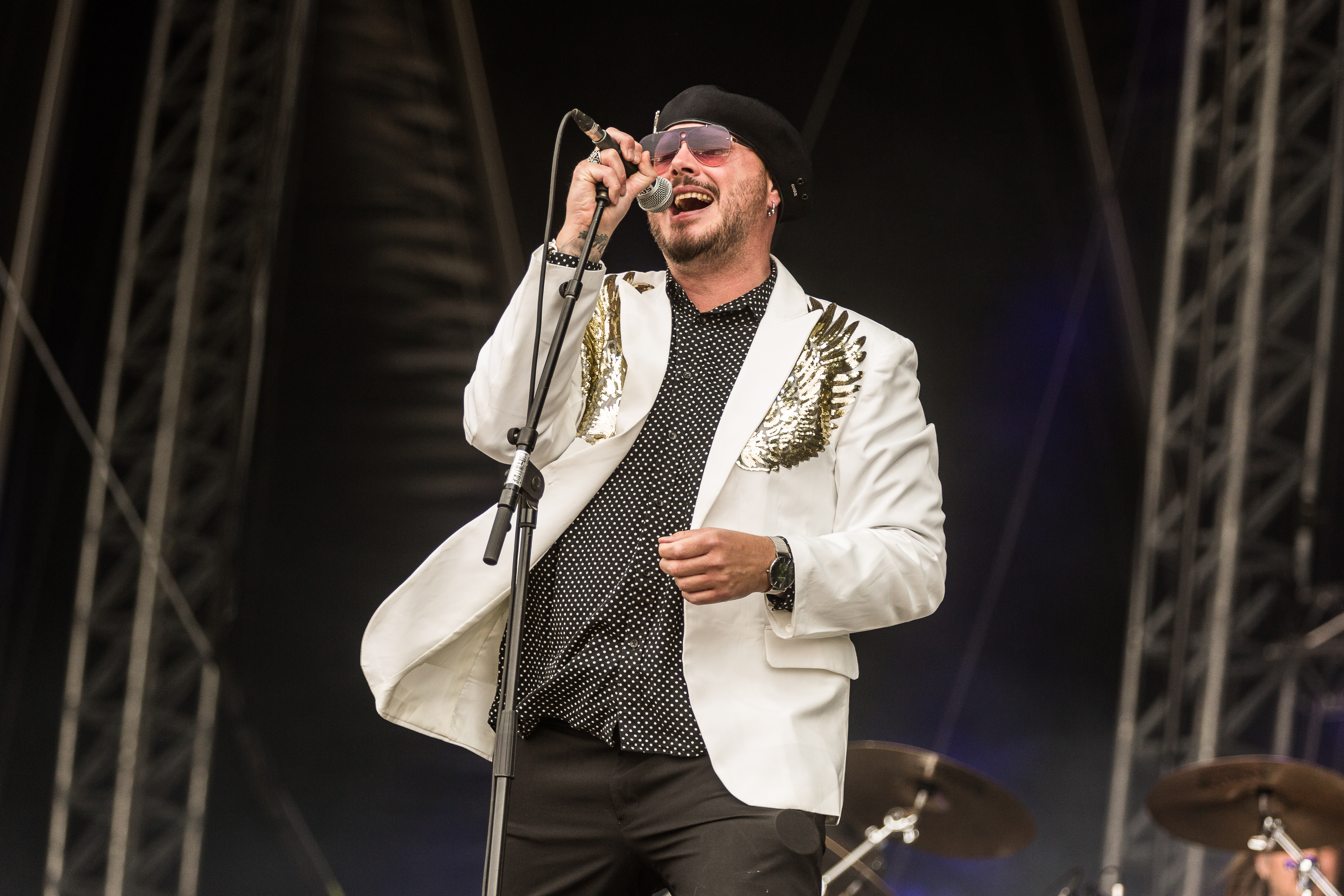
Björn Strid on stage with The Night Flight Orchestra, Rockharz Open Air 2019, Germany.

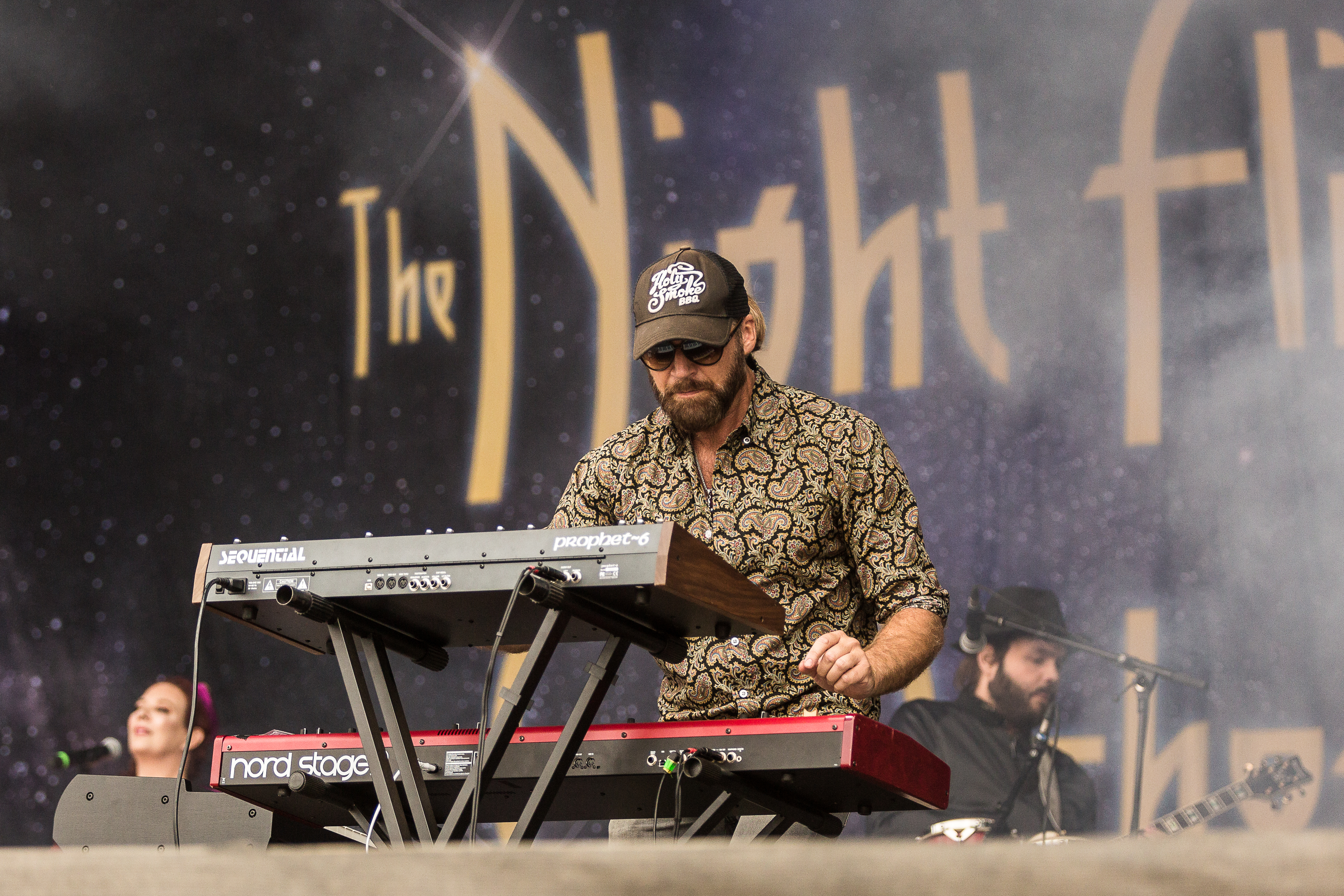
Richard Larsson on stage with The Night Flight Orchestra, Rockharz Open Air 2019, Germany.

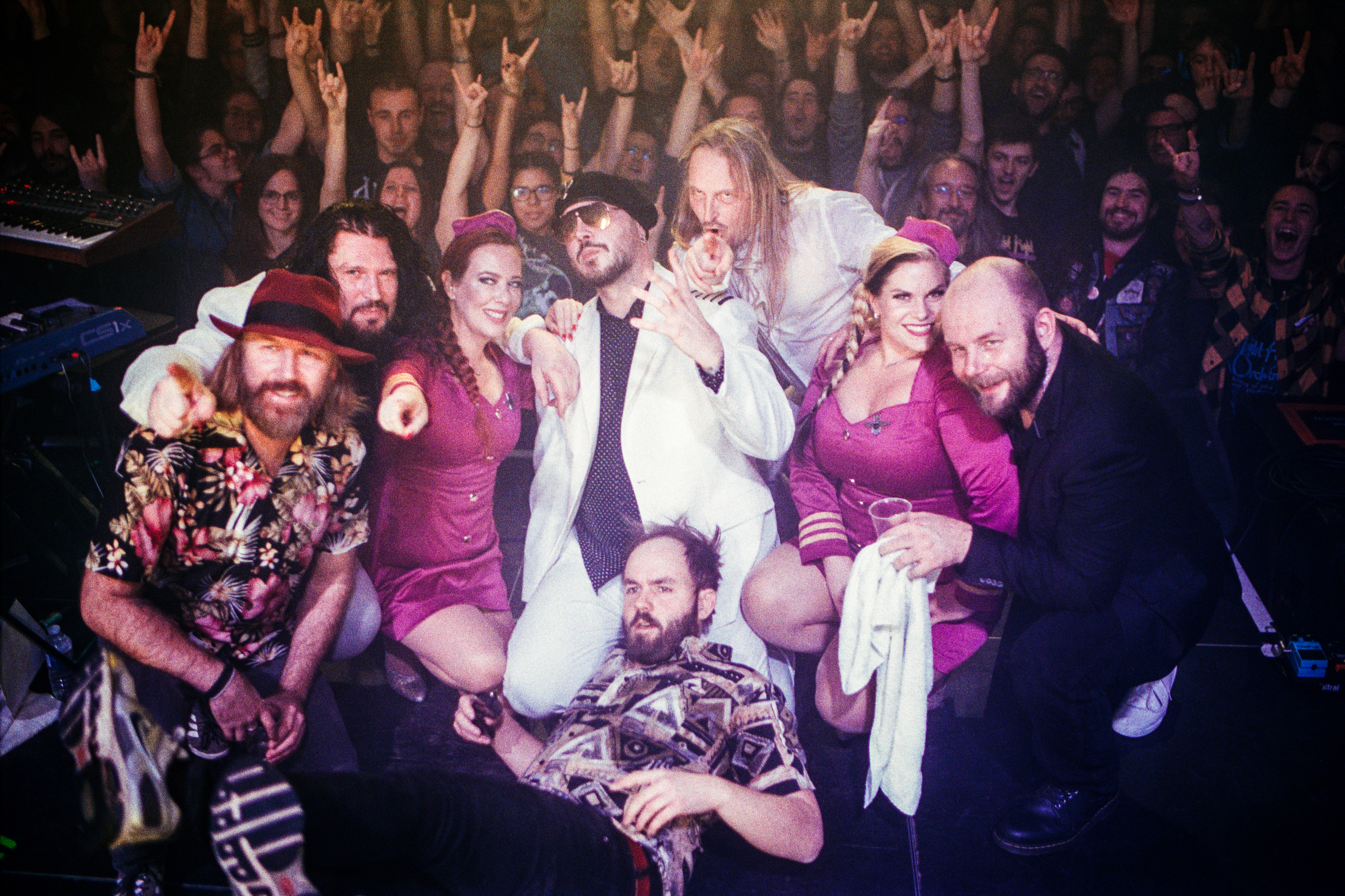
The Night Flight Orchestra in Paris during the Sometimes The World Ain't Enough tour.

== History ==
=== Internal Affairs (2012) ===
The Night Flight Orchestra started when Björn Strid (Soilwork) and David Andersson (Soilwork, Mean Streak) were on the road together in North America in 2007. Björn and David were bonding over what they considered "classic" or not, from rock n roll conspiracies to being arrested in a lobby with nothing but leather pants on. All those scenarios, fictional or real, needed a soundtrack. It didn't take long before bass player Sharlee D'Angelo (Arch Enemy, Spiritual Beggars) joined forces as well as keyboard player Richard Larsson (Von Benzo) and drummer Jonas Källsbäck (Mean Streak). Their goal was to reclaim the 70's/early 80's sense for classic melody.

They released their first album Internal Affairs on 18 June 2012 through the Italian label Coroner Records and made their live debut on 1 August 2013 at Dina-scenen in Lidköping, Sweden. Due to their busy schedules with both Soilwork and Arch Enemy, they could only manage to play live for the first time one year after the release of Internal Affairs and only did a handful of concerts between 2013 and 2014 including a show at Sweden Rock Festival in 2014.

=== Skyline Whispers (2015) ===
In January 2015, the Night Flight Orchestra announced a new album release on 9 June 2015 via Coroner Records, and the addition of Sebastian Forslund (Kadawatha) on congas, percussion and guitar. Skyline Whispers was recorded at Nordic Sound Lab Studios, Skara (Sweden), engineered by The Night Flight Orchestra and Bengan Andersson, mixed by Sebastian Forslund and mastered by Thomas Plec Johansson at Panic Room Studios, Skara (Sweden).

=== Amber Galactic (2017) ===
The band signed to Nuclear Blast Records in 2016. Their third album, Amber Galactic was released on 19 May 2017. The Night Flight Orchestra did their first European tour as a headline show in late 2017. On 15 December 2017, the Night Flight Orchestra were nominated for a Swedish Grammy Award in the category Best Rock/Metal for Amber Galactic.

=== Sometimes the World Ain't Enough (2018) ===
Less than one week after the release of Amber Galactic, singer Björn Strid stated in an interview that the Night Flight Orchestra were likely to start recording their fourth album a couple months later, during Summer 2017, to be released in Spring 2018.

On 5 April 2018, the Night Flight Orchestra announced that their new album Sometimes the World Ain't Enough was due to release on 29 June 2018. The same day, the band announced a European tour supporting the album in November and December 2018.

Like its predecessor Amber Galactic, Sometimes The World Ain't Enough has been nominated to the Swedish Grammy Awards for best rock/metal release.

=== Aeromantic (2020) and Aeromantic II (2021) ===
Intended as a saga, the band released the first part titled Aeromantic in 2020 (which was keyboardist Richard Larsson's last work with the band before departing), while the sequel was released on 3 September 2021.

On 14 September 2022 it was announced that guitarist David Andersson had died at the age of 47.

== Musical style ==
The music of The Night Flight Orchestra is mostly referred to as classic rock or AOR, or more rarely as hard rock, and seeks to emulate music from the 1970s and 1980s. With the album Sometimes the World Ain't Enough, the band added elements of disco music and funk. According to Matthias Weckmann from the German Metal Hammer magazine "the band delivers everything that one loves and loved about bands like Journey, Foreigner and Survivor". Björn Backes from the online magazine Powermetal.de compared the second studio album Skyline Whispers with British progressive rock of the 1970s and named Yes, Genesis, Kiss, Deep Purple and Rainbow as musical references.

Boris Kaiser from the German magazine Rock Hard compared the Night Flight Orchestra in his review for Sometimes the World Ain't Enough with bands like Toto, Kiss, Ghost, REO Speedwagon, Boston and Supertramp.

== Band members ==
Current

- Björn "Speed" Strid – vocals (2007–present)
- Sharlee D'Angelo – bass guitar (2007–present)
- Jonas Källsbäck – drums (2007–present)
- Sebastian Forslund – guitar, congas, percussion (2014–present)
- Anna Brygård – backing vocals (2017–present)
- John Lönnmyr – keyboards (2020–present)
- Åsa Lundman - backing vocals (2022–present)
- Rasmus Ehrnborn – guitar (2022–present)

Former

- David Andersson – guitar (2007–2022; died 2022)
- Richard Larsson – keyboards (2007–2020)
- Anna-Mia Bonde – backing vocals (2017–2022)

== Discography ==
Studio albums

- Internal Affairs (2012)
- Skyline Whispers (2015)
- Amber Galactic (2017)
- Sometimes the World Ain't Enough (2018)
- Aeromantic (2020)
- Aeromantic II (2021)
- Give Us the Moon (2025)
