= Demilich (band) =

Finnish death metal band

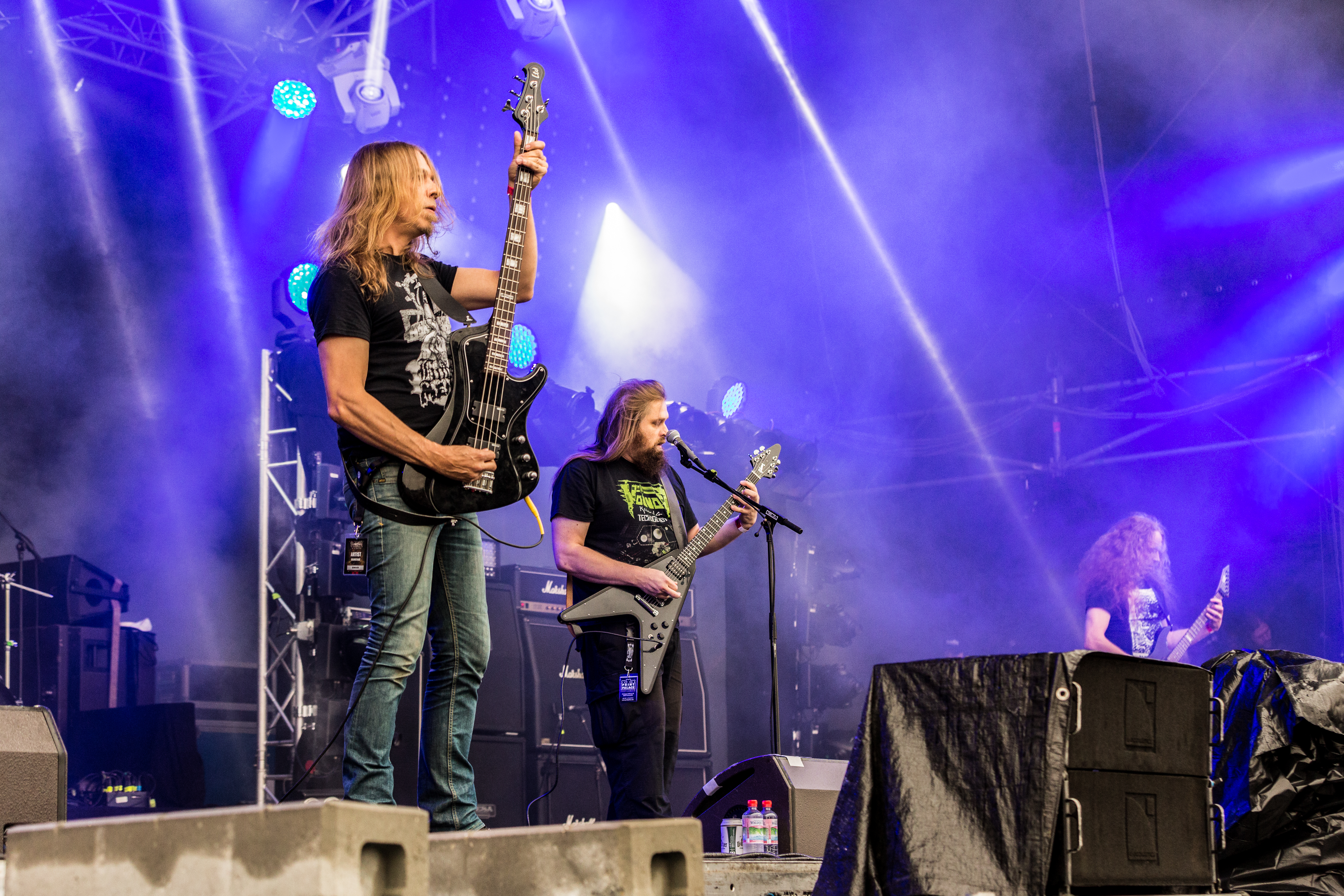
- Demilich at Party.San Metal Open Air 2017

Background information
- Origin: Kuopio, Finland
- Genres: Technical death metal, experimental metal
- Years active: 1990–1993, 2006, 2010, 2015–present
- Label: Necropolis
- Members: Antti Boman; Mikko Virnes; Aki Hytönen; Jarkko Luomajoki
- Past members: Ville Koistinen; Jussi Teräsvirta; Tommi Hoffren
- Website: www.demilich.band

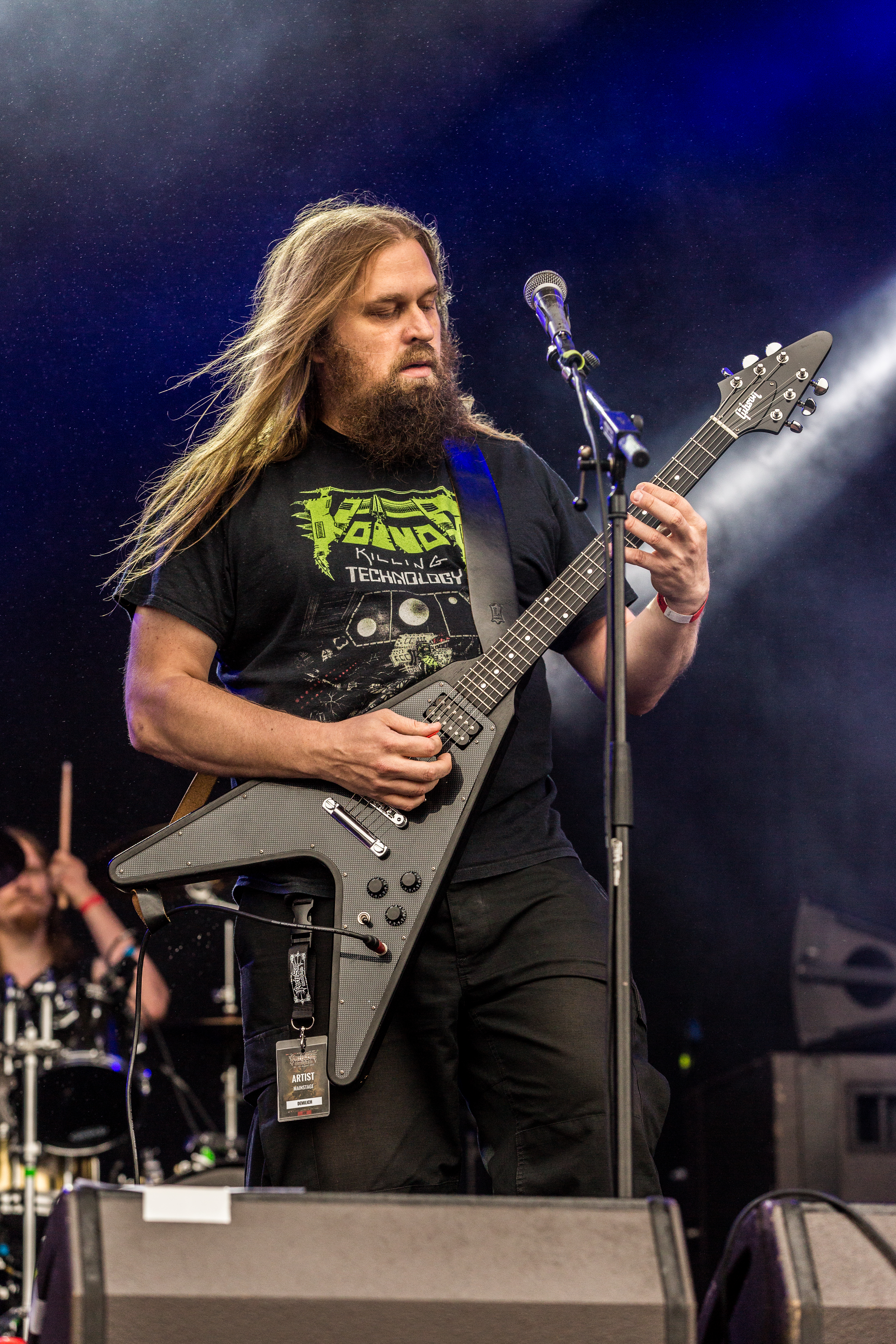
Antti Boman at Party.San 2017

Demilich is a Finnish death metal band that formed in the early 1990s and consists of vocalist/guitarist Antti Boman, guitarist Aki Hytönen, bassist Ville Koistinen, and drummer Mikko Virnes. Their debut album, Nespithe,(1993), features intricate death metal riffs with unusually low, guttural vocals in the vocal fry register. The album contains long, complicated song titles and unconventional lyrics that were written in code in the booklet.

Nespithe was featured in Terrorizer's Secret History of Death Metal, in their list of "The 40 Albums You Must Hear"; they commented: "Even trying to scream your lungs out whilst vomiting a mix of haggis, outdated goat's cheese and kebab won't do. Tested extensively by Terrorizer's scientific team, we can now safely say that no normal human is capable of reproducing the effect-free vocal madness displayed by Antti Boman on these Finns' sole, totally unique, album." Metal Injection stated that the band enjoys "legendary status" in the scene despite only releasing one album.

Demilich played what was believed to be their last show on 22 July 2006, but performed many other shows since then, including appearances at Jalometalli Metal Music Festival and Maryland Death Fest. The band was scheduled to play the Summer Massacre music festival in 2025, but the event was cancelled. The band reportedly has written new material.

== History ==
Guitarist/vocalist Antti Boman and drummer Mikko Virnes founded Demilich in 1990, creating an avant-garde, technical death metal sound in A standard tuning, with extremely low-register vocals. Demilich recorded four demo tapes (some containing re-used material from previous demos) before recording their debut, Nespithe, in 1993. The band split up shortly after the release of the album due to complications with their record label and the album's profits. Demilich remained inactive until 2005, when they reformed and began playing live shows, as well as writing new material. This material would not be released until 2014. Demilich played what was to be their last show in 2006, yet performed one-off shows in the following years.

The compilation release 20th Adversary of Emptiness contains everything Demilich have ever recorded, starting from the Regurgitation of Blood demo (1991) and rounding things off with three songs the band recorded during their brief comeback in 2006. The only Demilich full-length album, Nespithe, has been reissued several times over the years in various guises, but always using 16-bit CD masters and sometimes heavily brickwalled. For this release, the band dug up the original unmastered 24-bit studio tapes for Nespithe and best possible sources for the demo material, and had Sami Jämsén of Studio Perkele master these original unmastered mixes.

== Discography ==
=== Studio albums ===
- Nespithe (1993)

=== Demos ===
- Regurgitation of Blood (1991)
- The Four Instructive Tales... of Decomposition (1991)
- ...Somewhere Inside the Bowels of Endlessness... (1992)
- The Echo (1992)

=== Compilation albums ===
- 20th Adversary of Emptiness (2014)
- Em9t2ness of Van2s1ing / V34ish6ng 0f Emptiness (2018)
