= The Root of All Evil (album) =

Studio album of re-recorded songs by Arch Enemy
- Released: 28 September 2009
- Recorded: 2009
- Genre: Melodic death metal
- Length: 52:22
- Label: Century Media
- Producer: Arch Enemy Andy Sneap

Arch Enemy chronology
Manifesto of Arch Enemy (2009)	The Root of All Evil (2009)	Khaos Legions (2011)

Singles from The Root of All Evil
- 1. "The Beast Of Man" Released: 6 October 2009; 2. "Dark Insanity" Released: 20 October 2009

The Root of All Evil is a studio album by Swedish melodic death metal band Arch Enemy, featuring re-recorded songs from the first three albums by the band—Black Earth (tracks 1, 6, 8, 10, 11), Stigmata (tracks 2, 4, 13), and Burning Bridges (tracks 3, 5, 7, 9, 12). It was released on 28 September 2009 by Century Media Records and was made available as a jewel case CD, limited edition mediabook, digital media download and LP. The album was produced by the band themselves and mixed and mastered by Andy Sneap. All songs from this album are re-recordings, with the title track being another version of the instrumental Demoniality.

== Track listing ==
Professional ratings
Review scores
Source	Rating
AllMusic	3.5/5 stars
Collector's Guide to Heavy Metal	5/10
Metal Hammer	8/10 stars
Metal Underground	5/5 stars
SMN News	8/10 stars
Thrash Hits	2.5/6 stars

No.	Title	Lyrics	Music	Length
1.	"The Root of All Evil" (intro)		Michael Amott/Daniel Erlandsson	1:06
2.	"Beast of Man"	M. Amott	M. Amott/Christopher Amott	3:45
3.	"The Immortal"	Johan Liiva/M. Amott	M. Amott/C. Amott	3:47
4.	"Diva Satanica"	M. Amott	M. Amott/C. Amott	3:48
5.	"Demonic Science"	M. Amott	M. Amott/C. Amott	5:24
6.	"Bury Me an Angel"	M. Amott	M. Amott	4:25
7.	"Dead Inside"	M. Amott	M. Amott/C. Amott	4:24
8.	"Dark Insanity"	Liiva	M. Amott/Liiva	3:25
9.	"Pilgrim"	M. Amott	M. Amott/C. Amott	4:50
10.	"Demoniality" (instrumental)		M. Amott	1:40
11.	"Transmigration Macabre"	M. Amott	M. Amott	3:33
12.	"Silverwing"	M. Amott	M. Amott/C. Amott	4:22
13.	"Bridge of Destiny"	M. Amott	M. Amott/C. Amott	7:53
Total length:				52:22

=== Limited edition bonus tracks ===
No.	Title	Lyrics	Music	Length
14.	"Bury Me an Angel" (Live at the London Forum 2004)	M. Amott	M. Amott	4:22
15.	"The Immortal" (Live at the London Forum 2004)	Liiva/M. Amott	M. Amott/C. Amott	4:34
16.	"Bridge of Destiny" (Live at the London Forum 2004)	M. Amott	M. Amott/C. Amott	7:36
Total length:				68:54

=== Japan bonus tracks ===
The Japanese release of the album includes the above-mentioned live tracks plus an additional two tracks.

No.	Title	Writer(s)	Length
17.	"Wings of Tomorrow" (Europe cover)	Joey Tempest	3:14
18.	"Walk in the Shadows" (Queensrÿche cover)	Geoff Tate/Chris DeGarmo/Michael Wilton	3:07
Total length:			75:15

== Release dates ==
- Germany / Austria / Switzerland / Italy / Benelux: 25 September 2009
- UK / France / Greece / Denmark / Norway / Rest of Europe: 28 September 2009
- Spain / Portugal: 29 September 2009
- Finland / Sweden / Hungary / Japan: 30 September 2009
- United States: 6 October 2009

== Charts ==
Chart (2009)	Peak position
French Album Chart	133

== Credits ==
=== Band members ===
- Angela Gossow – vocals
- Michael Amott – guitar and backing vocals
- Christopher Amott – guitar
- Sharlee D'Angelo – bass
- Daniel Erlandsson – drums

=== Production ===
- Arch Enemy – production
- Andy Sneap – mixing and mastering
- Daniel Erlandsson – recording
- Rickard Bengtsson – recording
- Gustavo Sazes – artwork/layout
