= Internal Affairs (The Night Flight Orchestra album) =

Studio album by The Night Flight Orchestra
- Released: June 18, 2012
- Genre: Classic rock, AOR, hard rock
- Length: 57:30
- Label: Coroner Records

The Night Flight Orchestra chronology
Internal Affairs (2012)	Skyline Whispers (2015)

Professional ratings
Review scores
Source	Rating
Metal Temple	8/10 stars
Angry Metal Guy	favorable
Music and Festival Reviews	9/10
Rocktopia	wonderful!

Internal Affairs is the first studio album by Swedish classic rock/AOR band The Night Flight Orchestra, released on 18 June 2012 via Coroner Records.

== Track listing ==
No.	Title	Length
1.	"Siberian Queen"	6:03
2.	"California Morning"	5:37
3.	"Glowing City Madness"	3:57
4.	"West Ruth Ave"	6:42
5.	"Transatlantic Blues"	8:21
6.	"Miami 5:02"	3:49
7.	"Internal Affairs"	4:48
8.	"1998"	4:57
9.	"Stella Ain't No Dove"	4:27
10.	"Montreal Midnight Supply"	4:41
11.	"Green Hills of Glumslöv"	4:08
Total length:		57:30

Bonus tracks
No.	Title	Length
12.	"American High"	3:36 *
13.	"Song For Ingeborg"	2:44 **

- * (bonus track for US and Europe limited digipak edition and Japanese edition)
- ** (bonus track for Japanese edition.)

== Credits ==
=== Personnel ===
The Night Flight Orchestra

- Björn "Speed" Strid – vocals
- David Andersson – guitar
- Sharlee D'Angelo – bass
- Richard Larsson – keyboards
- Jonas Källsbäck – drums
