= Animal (F**k Like a Beast) =

1984 single by W.A.S.P.

Single by W.A.S.P.
- B-side: "Show No Mercy"
- Released: April 1984 (UK)
- Genre: Heavy metal, shock rock
- Label: Music for Nations
- Songwriter: Blackie Lawless
- Producer: Mike Varney

W.A.S.P. singles chronology
"Animal (F**k Like a Beast)" (1984)	"I Wanna Be Somebody" (1984)

"Live... Animal"

Single by W.A.S.P.
- A-side: "Animal (F**k Like a Beast)"; (live at Long Beach Arena, California, March 1987)
- B-side: "Hellion" (live Oct. 1984); "Mississippi Queen"
- Released: 1987 (US)
- Label: Restless Records (US)
- Songwriter: Blackie Lawless

"Live Animal (F**k Like a Beast)"

Single by W.A.S.P.
- B-side: "Animal (F**k Like a Beast)" (studio); "D.B. Blues"
- Released: 1988 (UK)
- Label: Music for Nations (UK)
- Songwriter: Blackie Lawless

"Animal (F**k Like a Beast)" is a song by American heavy metal band W.A.S.P. It was originally intended to be the opening track on their self-titled 1984 debut album, but was dropped before the album's release, although it appears as a bonus track on the 1998 reissue. Written by Blackie Lawless, the song was released as the band's first single.

In the United States, the song was first released in a live version in 1988. The studio version was available in that region only in 1998, on the reissue of W.A.S.P.'s debut album, which omitted the asterisks used to censor the title originally.

== History ==
According to a 1997 article that accompanied a reissue of W.A.S.P's debut album which features this track, the basis of the song, according to an article in Kerrang! magazine, was that Lawless had observed a photo of two lions mating in National Geographic magazine.

Recorded in early 1984, the debut single intended for the self-titled album of W.A.S.P. was close to not being released at all after being dropped from the album. Deemed too controversial, Capitol Records did not want to risk the album being banned from major retail chains.

The record company had subsequent plans to release the single only in Europe, in a black plastic bag and with a warning sticker about the explicit lyrics. Capitol backed out at the last minute and the single was shelved until the band was able to strike a one-off publishing deal with the independent label Music for Nations.

The single was finally released in April 1984, complete with the original sleeve and art depicting a codpiece and a circular saw blade.

== Live performance ==
Until 2022, W.A.S.P had not played the song live since 2006. In a 2009 interview with FVN.no, Blackie Lawless vowed to never play it again due to it being against his Christian religious beliefs and his desire to be a positive influence. However, in 2022, the band performed it at the opening concert of their 40th anniversary tour at the House of Blues Las Vegas.
