= I Wanna Be Somebody =

Single by W.A.S.P.

from the album W.A.S.P.
- B-side: "Tormentor"
- Released: 1984
- Genre: Heavy metal; glam metal
- Length: 3:42
- Label: Capitol
- Songwriter(s): Blackie Lawless
- Producer(s): Blackie Lawless, Mike Varney

W.A.S.P. singles chronology
"Animal (F**k Like a Beast)" (1984)	"I Wanna Be Somebody" (1984)	"L.O.V.E. Machine" (1984)

"I Wanna Be Somebody" is the first single from heavy metal band W.A.S.P.'s debut album W.A.S.P.

It was ranked at #84 in VH1's 100 Greatest Hard Rock Songs. The song's title is taken from an episode of Barney Miller, where Detective Ron Harris states that "God I Wanna Be Somebody" in a manner which Blackie Lawless found humorous.

== Track listing ==
7 inch single
No.	Title	Length
1.	"I Wanna Be Somebody"	3:42
2.	"Tormentor"	3:36

== Charts ==
Chart (1984)	Peak position
New Zealand (Recorded Music NZ)	30
UK Singles (OCC)	77
