= Witchery =

Swedish extreme metal band

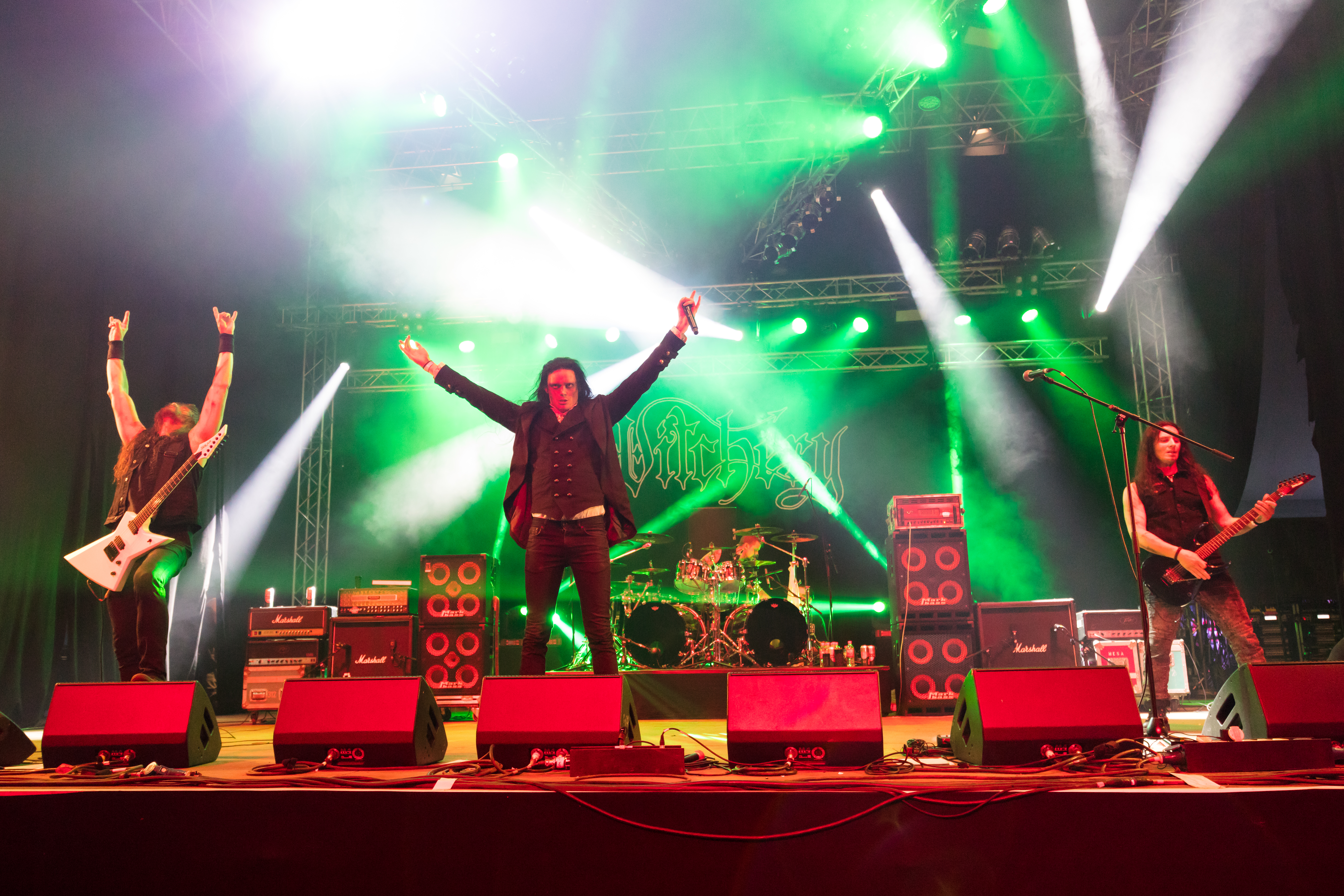
- Witchery at Wacken Open Air 2017

Background information
- Origin: Linköping, Sweden
- Genres: Thrash metal, speed metal, death metal, black metal
- Years active: 1997–present
- Label: Century Media

Witchery is a Swedish blackened thrash/speed metal band formed by former members of Satanic Slaughter in 1997. The current lineup consists of guitarists Patrik Jensen and Rickard "Rille" Rimfält, vocalist Angus Norder, drummer Chris Barkensjö, and bassist Victor Brandt.

== History ==
The band began in 1997 when Swedish cult band Satanic Slaughter split up in a way that basically only left their singer Ztephan Dark in the band. Thus the proto-version of Witchery started out with Satanic Slaughter members Patrik Jensen (Orchriste, The Haunted), Rickard "Rille" Rimfält, vocalist Toxine (Seance, Total Death), drummer Mique (Seance), and bassist Sharlee D'Angelo (Arch Enemy, Mercyful Fate) on board. In 1998 they recorded and released their debut Restless And Dead through Necropolis Records, the name of the album being a pun on Restless and Wild an album by German heavy metal icons Accept. Witchery quickly gathered a cult following with their combination of serious, technical thrash metal and all topics "dead". Their strictly tongue-in-cheek humour, often involving executions, murder, necrophilia, resurrections and other morbid topics can be spotted in song titles and album names as well as in their very own mascot – an animated skeleton called "Ben Wrangle", the name being a pun on the Swedish word "benrangel" which best translates into "skeleton".

Witchery also have their own heavy metal salute, a derivation from the original sign of the horns "Evil Eye" ward popularized by Ronnie James Dio called "The W". For properly "doing the W" only the ring finger and thumb of the performing hand touch. Rumour has it that the salute came into being as somebody in the band tried to do the metal salute with a cigarette between his fingers. This "W" is not to be confused with the Shocker.

Later that year, Witchery released the Witchburner minialbum. The EP featured three originals and four cover songs bearing witness to the individual musicians' influences, among them Accept, W.A.S.P and Judas Priest. The track "Witchburner" being the first ever recording of the band and like the other two original tracks "The Executioner" and "The Howling" only available on this EP so far. In 1999, Witchery embarked on a U.S. tour with Emperor and Borknagar. Their second full-length album Dead, Hot and Ready was unleashed soon thereafter, a six-week European tour following in 2000. Symphony For The Devil, the band's 2001 release, was recorded at Berno Studio (Amon Amarth, Dark Funeral) in Malmö, Sweden with new drummer, Martin "Axe" Axenrot (Bloodbath, Opeth). Witchery returned to tour North America later that year with The Haunted. Returning to Berno Studios in 2004, the band recorded Don't Fear The Reaper, this time entrusting mixing duties to Tue Madsen and his Antfarm Studios (The Haunted, Heaven Shall Burn, Himsa). After recording the album, the band signed a worldwide record deal with Century Media.

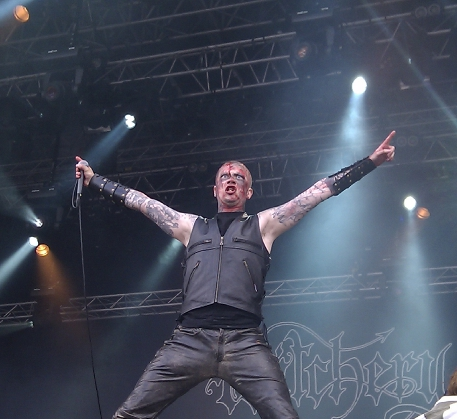
Legion from Witchery during Metaltown 2010 festival

In April 2010, black metal singer Legion (Erik Hagsted, ex-Marduk, ex-Devian) joined the band to replace Toxine who had to drop out because of schedule issues. According to the press release the split happened by mutual agreement. The new album entitled "Witchkrieg" (a play on the word Blitzkrieg) was released in June 2010. On 19 June 2010, the band played at the annual Metaltown festival in Gothenburg

Their sixth studio album, In His Infernal Majesty's Service, was released on 25 November on Century Media Records. It was followed by I am Legion in 2017.

== Band members ==
=== Current members ===
- Patrik Jensen – guitars (1997–present)
- Richard Corpse (Richard Rimfält) – guitars (1997–present)
- Angus Norder – vocals (2016–present)
- Chris Barkensjö – drums (2016–present)
- Victor Brandt – bass (2022–present; touring 2017)

=== Former members ===
- Sharlee D'Angelo – bass (1997–2022)
- Toxine (Tony Kampner) – vocals (1997–2010)
- Mique (Micke Pettersson) – drums (1997–1999)
- Martin Axenrot – drums (1999–2016)
- Legion (Erik Hagstedt) – vocals (2010–2011)
- Emperor Magus Caligula – vocals (2011–2016)

== Discography ==
=== Studio albums ===
- Restless & Dead (1998)
- Dead, Hot and Ready (1999)
- Symphony for the Devil (2001)
- Don't Fear the Reaper (2006)
- Witchkrieg (2010)
- In His Infernal Majesty's Service (2016)
- I Am Legion (2017)
- Nightside (2022)

=== EPs ===
- Witchburner – Necropolis (1999)
