= Satanic Slaughter =

Swedish black metal band

Background information
- Also known as: Evil Cunt
- Origin: Linköping, Sweden
- Genres: Black metal, death metal
- Years active: 1985–2006
- Labels: Necropolis Records; Black Sun Records
- Website: Official website (archived)

Satanic Slaughter was a Swedish black metal band.

== History ==
Having performed as Evil Cunt, the group adopted the name Satanic Slaughter in 1985. The group went through several guitarists and other lineup changes in its early years, before releasing its first demo, One Night in Hell, in 1988. The group split late in 1989 due to lead guitarist Ztephan "Dark" Karlsson's imprisonment for assault. In 1992, the group reformed with former members of Seance, and began playing in November 1994.

This lineup recorded its first album in 1996, which Necropolis Records issued. A second album followed on the same label the next year. In 1997, this incarnation of the group disbanded, and all members except Dark reunited as Witchery. Following this, Dark reformed the band with new members.

Further lineup changes occurred between 1997 and the release of their next LP, 2000's Afterlife Kingdom, which was followed by touring in Europe with Ragnarok. In the wake of Witchery's success, Necropolis reissued Satanic Slaughter and Land of the Unholy Souls on one disc as The Early Years: Dawn of Darkness in 2001. The group released Banished to the Underworld in 2002, toured Europe with Lord Belial and Corporation 187. In 2004, the group returned to Europe to tour with Misericordia and Avenger.

After a short hiatus, the group reassembled with new members, and announced new plans in March 2006. These were cut short when Dark, the only remaining original member of the group, died of heart failure in April 2006.

== Members ==
Lineup as of 2006

- Ztephan Dark – guitar (1985–2006, died 19 April) (Morbidity, Morgue)
- Stefan Johansson – guitar (1999–) (The Grand Trick, Dismal, Morgue)
- Simon Axenrot – bass (2003–)
- Fredrik Nilsson – drums (2006–) (Spetälsk, Misericordia)

Former members

Vocals:

- Toxine (Tony Kampner) (Witchery, Seance) (1987/1994-1997)
- Andreas Deblèn (Höst, Deranged, Morgue, Spiteful) (1995–2006)

Guitar:

- Mikki Fixx (1985)
- Jörgen Sjöström (1985)
- Patrik Strandberg (1985)
- Jonas Hagberg (1987–1989)
- Janne Karlsson (1989)
- Patrik Jensen (Witchery, The Haunted, Brujeria, Seance, Orchriste) (1994–1997)
- Richard Corpse (Witchery, Seance, Morgue)
- Kecke Ljungberg (Morgue) (1997–1999)

Bass:

- Ron B. Goat (1985–1987)
- Patrik "Kulman" (1987–1989)
- Peter Blomberg (Belsebub) (1989)
- Filip Carlsson (Corporation 187, Höst, Thornclad, Spiteful, Demons to Prefer) (1997–2003)

Drums:

- Pontus Sjösten, (Denata) (1985)
- Peter Svedenhammar (1985–1987)
- Robert Falstedt (1987–1989)
- Evert Karlsson (1989)
- Gerry Malmström (1989)
- Mique (Witchery, Seance, Freevil) (1987/1994-1997)
- Robert Eng (Corporation 187, Höst) (1997–1998)
- Martin Axenrot (Nephenzy Chaos Order, Nifelheim, Morgue, Triumphator, Witchery, Bloodbath, Opeth) (1998–2006)

== Discography ==
- One Night in Hell demo (1988)
- Satanic Slaughter (Necropolis Records, 1995)
- Land of the Unholy Souls (Necropolis Records, 1996)
- Afterlife Kingdom (Loud 'N Proud, 2000)
- The Early Years: Dawn of Darkness (Necropolis Records, 2001)
- Banished to the Underworld (Black Sun Records, 2002)
