= Sharlee D'Angelo =

Swedish bassist (born 1973)

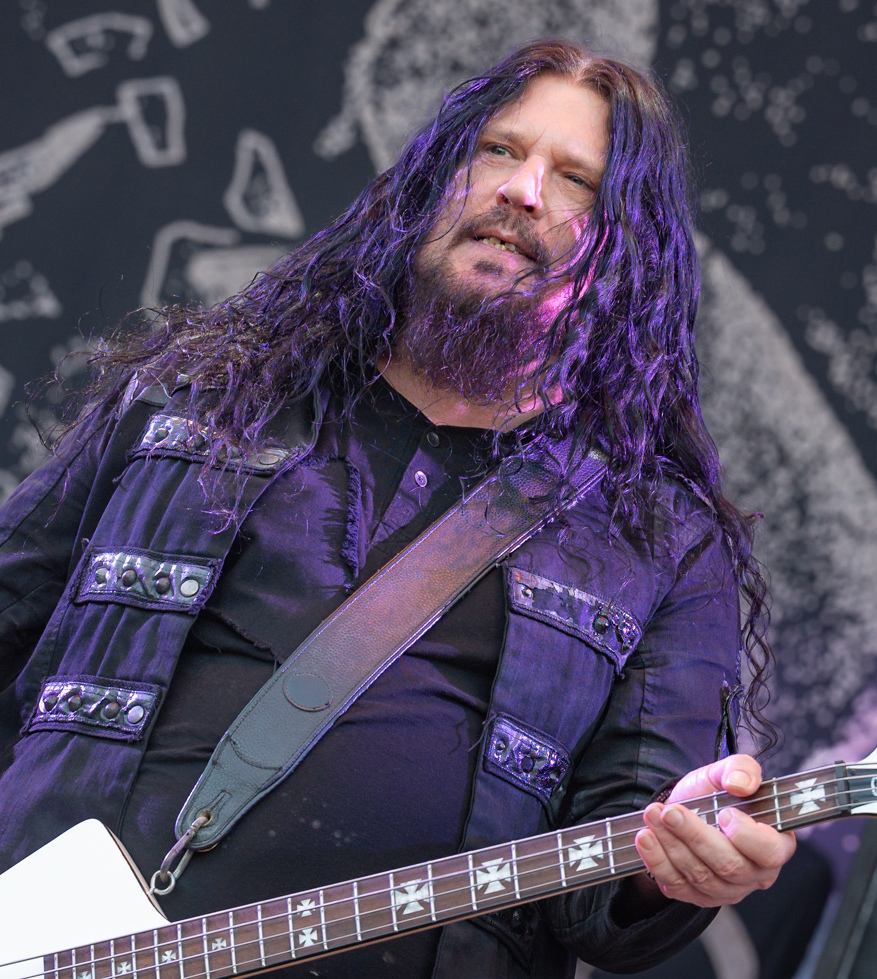
- D'Angelo with Arch Enemy in 2023

Background information
- Born: Charles Petter Andreason; 27 April 1973 (age 53)
- Genres: Melodic death metal, death metal, black metal, heavy metal, hard rock
- Occupation: Bassist
- Years active: 1989–present
- Member of: Arch Enemy, The Night Flight Orchestra, Spiritual Beggars
- Formerly of: Witchery, King Diamond, Mercyful Fate, Dismember
- Website: archenemy.net

Sharlee D'Angelo (born Charles Petter Andreason, 27 April 1973) is a Swedish musician. He is the bassist for the melodic death metal band Arch Enemy, as well as the classic rock/AOR band the Night Flight Orchestra and the stoner metal band Spiritual Beggars.

D'Angelo has also been in various bands in the past, either as a studio session player or a full member. These include Arch Enemy, Mercyful Fate, Dismember, King Diamond and Witchery.

== Equipment ==
He plays with Dunlop picks and primarily used Rickenbacker bass guitars in his early career, before switching to playing and endorsing Ibanez Iceman bass guitars in 2005. Ibanez now produces the Sharlee D'Angelo signature bass guitar, called the SDB2, which is tuned to D'Angelo's preferred C standard (Low to High – C, F, B♭, E♭).

== Influences ==
D'Angelo has cited a number of bass players as early influences, including Roger Glover, Glenn Hughes, Steve Dawson, Peter Baltes, and John Entwistle.

== Discography ==
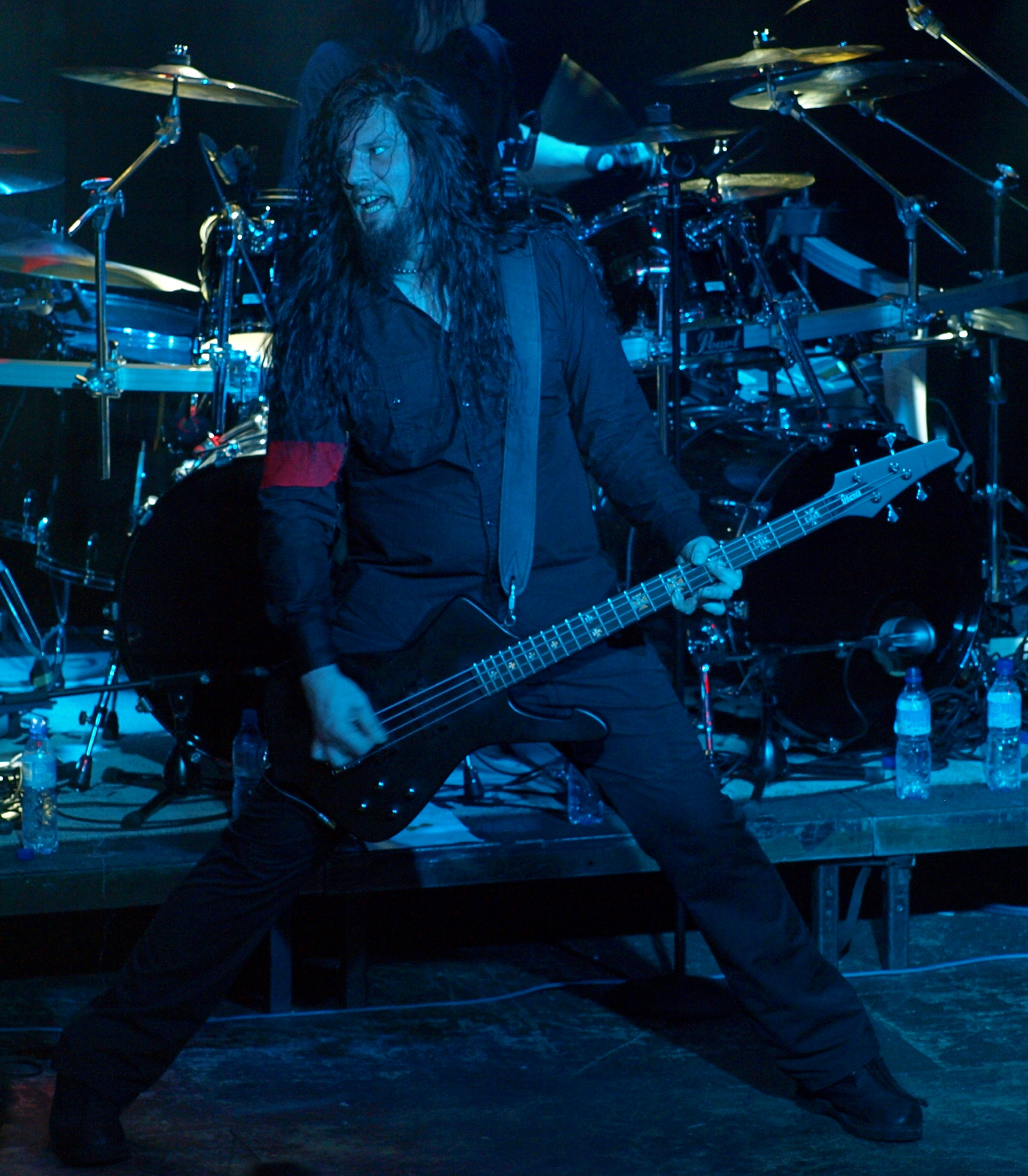
D'Angelo with Arch Enemy in 2008

=== With Mercyful Fate ===
- 1994 – Time
- 1996 – Into the Unknown
- 1998 – Dead Again
- 1999 – 9

=== With Facelift ===
- 1997 – State of the Art

=== With IllWill ===
- 1998 – Evilution

=== With Witchery ===
- 1998 – Restless & Dead
- 1999 – Dead, Hot and Ready
- 2001 – Symphony for the Devil
- 2006 – Don't Fear the Reaper
- 2010 – Witchkrieg
- 2016 – In His Infernal Majesty's Service
- 2017 – I Am Legion

=== With Sinergy ===
- 1999 – Beware the Heavens

=== With Arch Enemy ===
- 1999 – Burning Bridges
- 2000 – Burning Japan Live 1999
- 2001 – Wages of Sin
- 2003 – Anthems of Rebellion
- 2005 – Doomsday Machine
- 2006 – Live Apocalypse
- 2007 – Rise of the Tyrant
- 2008 – Tyrants of the Rising Sun
- 2009 – The Root of All Evil
- 2011 – Khaos Legions
- 2014 – War Eternal
- 2017 – Will to Power
- 2019 – Covered in Blood
- 2022 – Deceivers
- 2025 – Blood Dynasty

=== With Dismember ===
- 2000 – Hate Campaign

=== With Spiritual Beggars ===
- 2005 – Demons
- 2010 – Return to Zero
- 2013 – Earth Blues
- 2016 – Sunrise to Sundown

=== With the Night Flight Orchestra ===
- 2012 – Internal Affairs
- 2015 – Skyline Whispers
- 2017 – Amber Galactic
- 2018 – Sometimes the World Ain't Enough
- 2020 – Aeromantic
- 2021 – Aeromantic II
