= Necropolis Records =

Record label

Necropolis Records (located in Fremont, California) was a record label founded by Paul Thind in 1993, mainly providing an American home for extreme black metal.

The label's roster included artists such as Archgoat, The Black, Incantation, Satanic Slaughter, Witchery, Rotten Sound, Babylon Whores, Dissection, Dawn, Tartaros, Vondur, Impaled and Demilich. The label folded in 2003.
