= List of Soilwork band members =

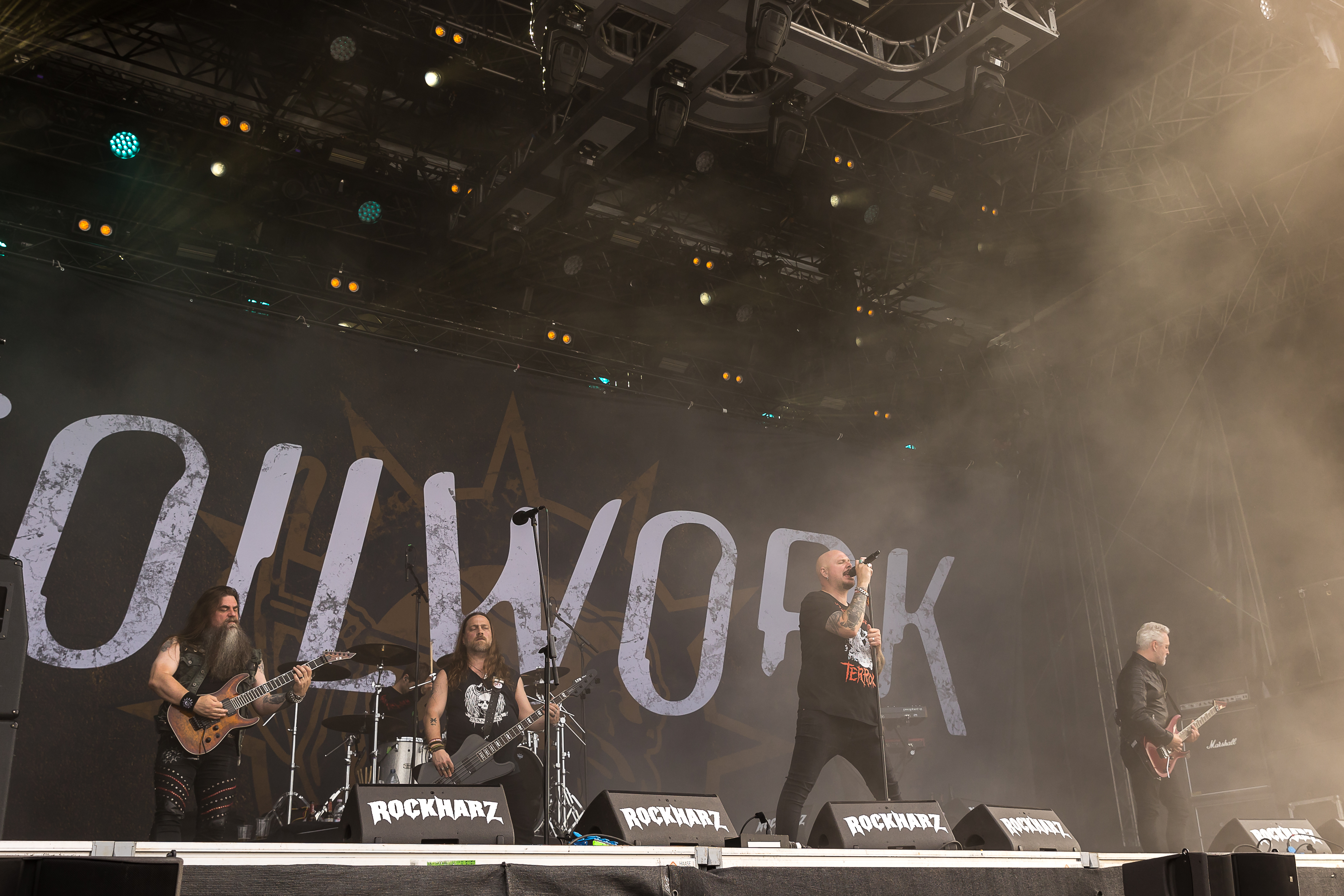
Soilwork performing live in 2024.

Soilwork are a Swedish melodic death metal band from Helsingborg. Formed in 1995, the group originally consisted of vocalist Björn "Speed" Strid, guitarists Peter Wichers and Ludvig Svartz, bassist Carl-Gustav Döös, and drummer Jimmy Persson. The sole constant member is Strid, who is joined in the current lineup by keyboardist Sven Karlsson (since 2001), guitarist Sylvain Coudret (since 2008), drummer Bastian Thusgaard (since 2016), bassist Rasmus Ehrnborn (since 2022) and guitarist Simon Johansson (since 2023).

== History ==
Soilwork formed in late 1995, originally under the name Inferior Breed. The band's initial lineup featured vocalist Björn "Speed" Strid, guitarists Peter Wichers and Ludvig Svartz, bassist Carl-Gustav Döös, and drummer Jimmy Persson, although Döös left before the band had recorded. After releasing their first demo In Dreams We Fall into the Eternal Lake, the band were joined by new bassist Ola Flink and their first keyboardist Carlos Holmberg for the recording of their debut album, Steelbath Suicide. Svartz and Persson were subsequently replaced by Ola Frenning and Henry Ranta, respectively, for the recording of 1999's The Chainheart Machine and 2001's A Predator's Portrait. Just before the recording of the band's fourth album Natural Born Chaos in late 2001, Holmberg was replaced by Sven Karlsson.

In June 2003, shortly after the release of Figure Number Five, Ranta left Soilwork to "dedicate more time to his personal life". He was replaced for the rest of the year by Richard Evensand, who toured with the group until leaving in January 2004 to join Chimaira. He was replaced the next month by Dirk Verbeuren, initially on a temporary basis, before he became a full-time member in December 2005. The new lineup released Stabbing the Drama in early 2005, before Wichers left that December, claiming that he was "worn out from all the touring". The guitarist was replaced for a string of European festival appearances in spring and summer 2006 by Daniel Antonsson, and later for shows in the UK in September by Andreas Holma. A third guitarist was trialled during shows in the US towards the end of the year, before Antonsson took over permanently in time for the recording of Sworn to a Great Divide in early 2007. Also in the summer, Peter Wildoer had been forced to substitute for Verbeuren for a few shows.

In February 2008, the band announced they had parted ways with Frenning, claiming that he "resisted the demands of the road and found it difficult to come to terms with the amount of touring scheduled". For shows following the lineup change, Frenning was temporarily replaced by David Andersson followed by Sylvain Coudret. That September, the band announced the return of Peter Wichers, who took his place in the lineup back from Antonsson, with Coudret taking Frenning's place on a permanent basis at the same time. The new lineup released The Panic Broadcast in 2010, before Wichers left for a second time in June 2012 due to "creative differences". He was replaced by David Andersson, who had filled in for Wichers during a string of shows in the spring of 2011 (which eventually led to his departure).

With new guitarist Andersson, Soilwork released The Living Infinite in 2013 and Beyond the Infinite in 2014, before announcing the departure of Flink after 18 years in June 2015. He was replaced for the tour in promotion of The Ride Majestic by Markus Wibom. The following July, Verbeuren also left Soilwork to take over as Megadeth's drummer, with Bastian Thusgaard taking over in a touring capacity. He became a permanent member in April 2017. In January 2017, Taylor Nordberg took over from Wibom on bass, who had left late the previous year to focus on "other commitments". The band's 11th album Verkligheten followed in 2019, before Rasmus Ehrnborn joined as their first full-time bassist since 2015 in January 2022. Ehrnborn debuted on Övergivenheten, which was released in August 2022.

In September 2022, David Andersson died aged 47. The following March, Soilwork announced their return with new guitarist Simon Johansson, who had filled in for Andersson at shows since 2019.

== Members ==
=== Current ===
Image	Name	Years active	Instruments	Release contributions
	Björn "Speed" Strid	1995–present	lead vocals	all Soilwork releases
	Sven Karlsson	2001–present	keyboards	all Soilwork releases from Natural Born Chaos (2002) onwards, except The Early Chapters (2004)
	Sylvain Coudret	2008–present (touring 2008)	guitars; bass (studio 2015–2016)	all Soilwork releases from The Panic Broadcast (2010) onwards
	Bastian Thusgaard	2017–present (touring 2016–17)	drums; percussion	all Soilwork releases from Verkligheten (2019) onwards
	Rasmus Ehrnborn	2021–present (touring 2019–21)	bass; backing vocals	Övergivenheten (2022)
	Simon Johansson	2023–present (touring 2019–23)	guitars	none to date

=== Former ===
Image	Name	Years active	Instruments	Release contributions
	Peter Wichers	1995–2005; 2008–2012	guitars; bass (studio, 1997–1998)	all Soilwork releases from In Dreams We Fall into the Eternal Lake (1997) to Stabbing the Drama (2005); The Panic Broadcast (2010)
	Ludvig Svartz	1995–1998	guitars	In Dreams We Fall into the Eternal Lake (1997); Steelbath Suicide (1998)
	Jimmy "Judas" Persson	1995–1998	drums	In Dreams We Fall into the Eternal Lake (1997); Steelbath Suicide (1998)
	Carl-Gustav Döös	1995–1997	bass	none
	Ola Flink	1997–2015	bass; backing vocals	all Soilwork releases from Steelbath Suicide (1998) to Live in the Heart of Helsinki (2015)
	Carlos Holmberg	1997–2001	keyboards	Steelbath Suicide (1998); The Chainheart Machine (1999); A Predator's Portrait (2001)
	Ola Frenning	1998–2008	guitars	all Soilwork releases from The Chainheart Machine (1999) to Sworn to a Great Divide (2007)
	Henry Ranta	1998–2003	drums	all Soilwork releases from The Chainheart Machine (1999) to The Early Chapters (2004)
	Richard Evensand	2003–2004	drums	none
	Dirk Verbeuren	2005–2016 (touring 2004–2005)	drums	all Soilwork releases from Stabbing the Drama (2005) to The Ride Majestic (2015)
	Daniel Antonsson	2007–2008 (touring 2006)	guitars	Sworn to a Great Divide (2007)
	David Andersson	2012–2022 (touring 2008, 2011; died 2022)	guitars; bass (studio, 2015–2018); piano	all Soilwork releases from The Living Infinite (2013) to Övergivenheten (2022)
	Markus Wibom	2015–2017	bass	none

=== Touring ===
Image	Name	Years active	Instruments	Details
	Peter Wildoer	2006	drums	Wildoer filled in for Dirk Verbeuren at three shows in the summer of 2006 due to "increased flight costs".
	Andreas Holma	2006	guitars	Holma performed a string of shows in the UK while the band was auditioning for Peter Wichers' replacement.
	Morten Løwe Sørensen	2008	drums	Sørensen filled in for Dirk Verbeuren at two shows in Estonia and Latvia in February 2008 due to "visa issues".
	Taylor Nordberg	2017–2019	bass; backing vocals	Nordberg replaced Wilbom as touring bassist, and contributed backing vocals to Verkligheten (2019)

== Lineups ==
Period	Members	Releases
1995–1997 (as Inferior Breed until 1996)	Björn "Speed" Strid — vocals; Peter Wichers — guitars; Ludvig Svartz — guitars; Jimmy Persson — drums; Carl-Gustav Döös — bass	none
1997	Björn "Speed" Strid — vocals; Peter Wichers — guitars, bass; Ludvig Svartz — guitars; Jimmy Persson — drums	In Dreams We Fall into the Eternal Lake (1997)
1997–1998	Björn "Speed" Strid — vocals; Peter Wichers — guitars; Ludvig Svartz — guitars; Jimmy Persson — drums; Ola Flink — bass; Carlos Holmberg — keyboards	Steelbath Suicide (1998)
Late 1998–late 2001	Björn "Speed" Strid — vocals; Peter Wichers — guitars; Ola Flink — bass; Carlos Holmberg — keyboards; Ola Frenning — guitars; Henry Ranta — drums	The Chainheart Machine (1999); A Predator's Portrait (2001); The Early Chapters (2004)
Late 2001–June 2003	Björn "Speed" Strid — vocals; Peter Wichers — guitars; Ola Flink — bass; Ola Frenning — guitars; Henry Ranta — drums; Sven Karlsson — keyboards	Natural Born Chaos (2002); Figure Number Five (2003)
June 2003–January 2004	Björn "Speed" Strid — vocals; Peter Wichers — guitars; Ola Flink — bass; Ola Frenning — guitars; Sven Karlsson — keyboards; Richard Evensand — drums	none
February 2004–December 2005	Björn "Speed" Strid — vocals; Peter Wichers — guitars; Ola Flink — bass; Ola Frenning — guitars; Sven Karlsson — keyboards; Dirk Verbeuren — drums	Stabbing the Drama (2005)
March–August 2006	Björn "Speed" Strid — vocals; Ola Flink — bass; Ola Frenning — guitars; Sven Karlsson — keyboards; Dirk Verbeuren — drums; Daniel Antonsson — guitars (touring)	none
September 2006	Björn "Speed" Strid — vocals; Ola Flink — bass; Ola Frenning — guitars; Sven Karlsson — keyboards; Dirk Verbeuren — drums; Andreas Holma — guitars (touring)	none
October–November 2006	Björn "Speed" Strid — vocals; Ola Flink — bass; Ola Frenning — guitars; Sven Karlsson — keyboards; Dirk Verbeuren — drums; Unknown musician — guitars (touring)	none
Early 2007–February 2008	Björn "Speed" Strid — vocals; Ola Flink — bass; Ola Frenning — guitars; Sven Karlsson — keyboards; Dirk Verbeuren — drums; Daniel Antonsson — guitars	Sworn to a Great Divide (2007)
February–April 2008	Björn "Speed" Strid — vocals; Ola Flink — bass; Sven Karlsson — keyboards; Dirk Verbeuren — drums; Daniel Antonsson — guitars; David Andersson — guitars (touring)	none
May–August 2008	Björn "Speed" Strid — vocals; Ola Flink — bass; Sven Karlsson — keyboards; Dirk Verbeuren — drums; Daniel Antonsson — guitars; Sylvain Coudret — guitars (touring)	none
September 2008–June 2012	Björn "Speed" Strid — vocals; Ola Flink — bass; Sven Karlsson — keyboards; Dirk Verbeuren — drums; Sylvain Coudret — guitars; Peter Wichers — guitars	The Panic Broadcast (2010)
June 2012–June 2015	Björn "Speed" Strid — vocals; Ola Flink — bass; Sven Karlsson — keyboards; Dirk Verbeuren — drums; Sylvain Coudret — guitars; David Andersson — guitars	The Living Infinite (2013); Beyond the Infinite (2014); Live in the Heart of Helsinki (2015)
June 2015–July 2016	Björn "Speed" Strid — vocals; Sven Karlsson — keyboards; Dirk Verbeuren — drums; Sylvain Coudret — guitars, bass; David Andersson — guitars, bass; Markus Wibom — bass (touring)	The Ride Majestic (2015)
July 2016–January 2017	Björn "Speed" Strid — vocals; Sven Karlsson — keyboards; Sylvain Coudret — guitars; David Andersson — guitars, bass; Markus Wibom — bass (touring); Bastian Thusgaard — drums, percussion	none
January 2017–mid 2019	Björn "Speed" Strid — vocals; Sven Karlsson — keyboards; Sylvain Coudret — guitars; David Andersson — guitars, bass, piano; Bastian Thusgaard — drums, percussion; Taylor Nordberg — bass, backing vocals (touring)	Verkligheten (2019); Underworld (2019)
mid 2019–September 2022	Björn "Speed" Strid — lead vocals; Sven Karlsson — keyboards; Sylvain Coudret — guitars; David Andersson — guitars; Bastian Thusgaard — drums, percussion; Rasmus Ehrnborn — bass, backing vocals	A Whisp of the Atlantic (2020); Övergivenheten (2022)
March 2023–present	Björn "Speed" Strid — lead vocals; Sven Karlsson — keyboards; Sylvain Coudret — guitars; Bastian Thusgaard — drums, percussion; Rasmus Ehrnborn — bass, backing vocals; Simon Johanssen — guitars	none to date
