= Soilwork discography =

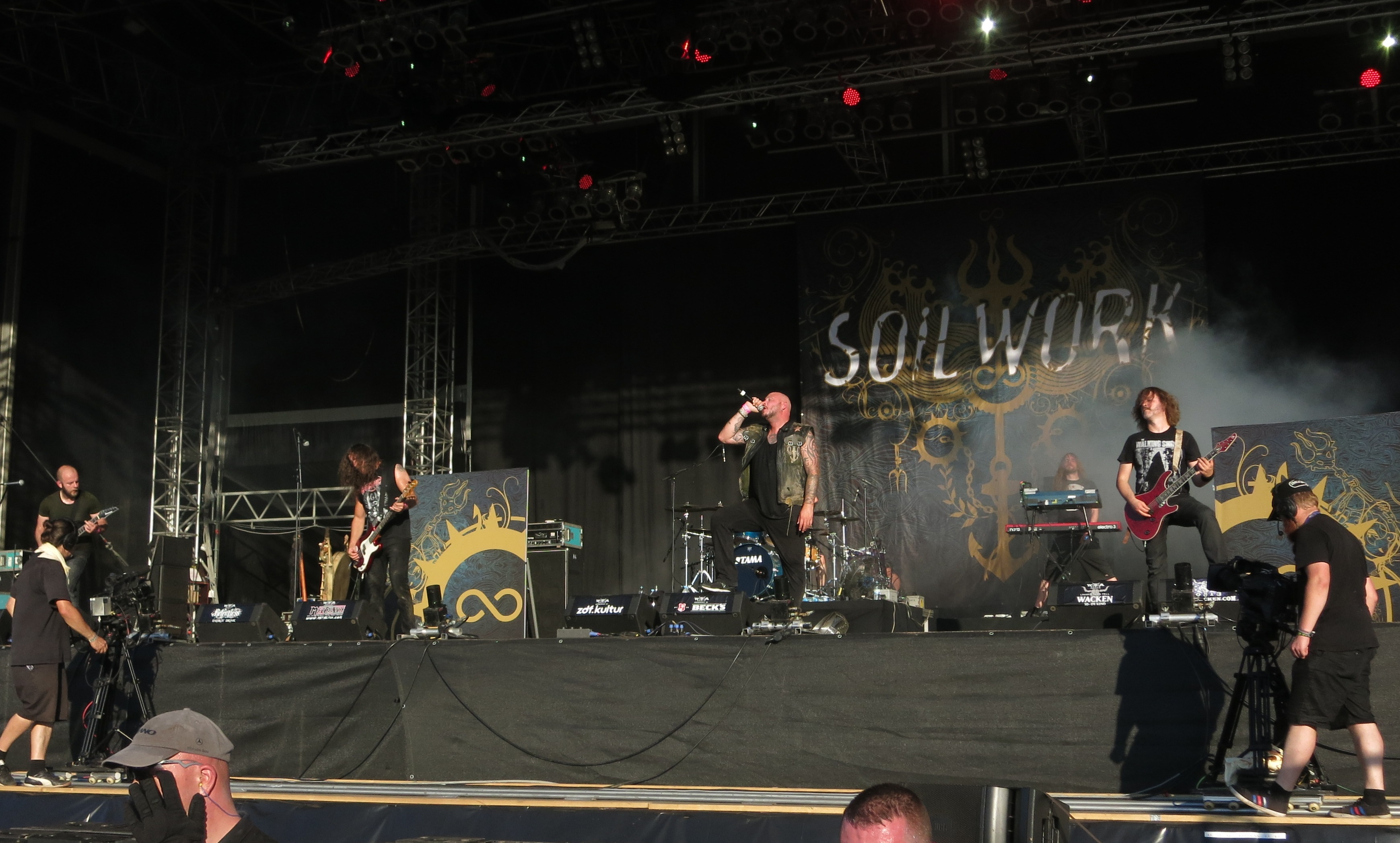
- Studio albums: 12
- EPs: 4
- Live albums: 1
- Compilation albums: 2
- Singles: 16
- Music videos: 23

The discography of Soilwork, a Swedish melodic death metal band, consists of twelve studio albums, one live album, two compilation albums, four extended plays, sixteen singles and 23 music videos.

== Albums ==
=== Studio albums ===
List of studio albums, with selected chart positions
Title	Album details	Peak chart positions							
Title	Album details	SWE	AUT	FIN	FRA	GER	JPN	SWI	US
Steelbath Suicide	Released: 20 May 1998; Label: Listenable	—	—	—	—	—	—	—	—
The Chainheart Machine	Released: 8 February 2000; Label: Century Media	—	—	—	—	—	—	—	—
A Predator's Portrait	Released: 20 February 2001; Label: Nuclear Blast	—	—	—	—	—	78	—	—
Natural Born Chaos	Released: 2 April 2002; Label: Nuclear Blast	—	—	—	—	—	59	—	—
Figure Number Five	Released: 6 May 2003; Label: Nuclear Blast	59	—	23	125	52	43	—	—
Stabbing the Drama	Released: 8 March 2005; Label: Nuclear Blast	14	63	19	143	52	41	—	191
Sworn to a Great Divide	Released: 23 October 2007; Label: Nuclear Blast	25	57	19	136	37	45	74	148
The Panic Broadcast	Released: 13 July 2010; Label: Nuclear Blast	29	47	14	141	24	42	60	88
The Living Infinite	Released: 5 March 2013; Label: Nuclear Blast	19	22	10	128	17	61	36	60
The Ride Majestic	Released: 28 August 2015; Label: Nuclear Blast	22	37	12	107	30	63	49	103
Verkligheten	Released: 11 January 2019; Label: Nuclear Blast	—	19	35	—	10	86	25	—
Övergivenheten	Released: 19 August 2022; Label: Nuclear Blast	29	35	15	—	15	66	20	—
"—" denotes a recording that did not chart or was not released in that territory.

=== Live albums ===
List of live albums, with selected details
Title	Album details
Live in the Heart of Helsinki	Released: 20 February 2015; Label: Nuclear Blast; Formats: Blu-ray, DVD, 2CD

=== Compilation albums ===
List of compilation albums, with selected details and chart positions
Title	Album details	Peak chart positions			
Title	Album details	AUT	GER	JPN	SWI
The Sledgehammer Files: The Best of Soilwork 1998–2008	Released: 20 July 2010; Label: Avalon Marquee; Formats: CD, DL	—	—	188	—
Death Resonance	Released: 19 August 2016; Label: Nuclear Blast; Formats: CD, 2LP	74	54	—	62

== Extended plays ==
List of extended plays
Title	EP details
The Early Chapters	Released: 9 March 2004; Label: Listenable; Formats: CD, DL
Beyond the Infinite	Released: 24 September 2014; Label: Victor Entertainment; Formats: CD, DL
Underworld	Released: 14 June 2019; Label: Nuclear Blast (NB 4696–6); Formats: MP3
A Whisp of the Atlantic	Released: 12 December 2020; Label: Nuclear Blast; Formats: CD, LP, DL

== Singles ==
List of singles, with selected chart positions, showing year released and album name
Title	Year	Peak chart positions	Album
Title	Year	FIN	Album
"Departure Plan"^{[A]}	2003	—	Figure Number Five
"Rejection Role"^{[A]}	2003	—	Figure Number Five
"Light the Torch"	2003	—	Figure Number Five
"Stabbing the Drama"	2005	7	Stabbing the Drama
"Exile"^{[B]}	2007	—	Sworn to a Great Divide
"The Pittsburgh Syndrome"^{[B]}	2007	—	Sworn to a Great Divide
"Let This River Flow"	2010	—	The Panic Broadcast
"Spectrum of Eternity"	2013	—	The Living Infinite
"This Momentary Bliss"	2013	—	The Living Infinite
"Rise Above the Sentiment"	2013	—	The Living Infinite
"Long Live the Misanthrope"	2013	—	The Living Infinite
"The Ride Majestic"	2015	—	The Ride Majestic
"Övergivenheten"	2022	—	Övergivenheten
"Nous Sommes La Guerre"	2022	—	Övergivenheten
"Dreams of Nowhere"	2022	—	Övergivenheten
"Spirit Of No Return"	2024	—	Non-album single
"—" denotes a recording that did not chart or was not released in that territory.

== Music videos ==
List of music videos, showing year released and director
Title	Year	Director(s)
"As We Speak"	2002	—N/a
"Rejection Role"	2003	—N/a
"Light the Torch"	2004	—N/a
"Nerve"	2005	Ralf Strathman
"Stabbing the Drama"	2005	—N/a
"Exile"	2007	Daniel Larsson
"20 More Miles"	2009	Olle Carlsson
"Deliverance Is Mine"	2010	Ivan Colic
"Let This River Flow"	2010	—N/a
"Rise Above the Sentiment"	2013	Sune Eskelinen, Niclas Lindahl
"Spectrum of Eternity"	2013	—N/a
"Death in General"	2015	—N/a
"Full Moon Shoals"	2018	—N/a
"Stålfågel"	2018	—N/a
"Feverish"	2019	—N/a
"Death Diviner"	2020	—N/a
"The Nothingness and the Devil"	2020	—N/a
"Desperado"	2020	—N/a
"A Whisp of the Atlantic"	2020	—N/a
"Övergivenheten"	2022	—N/a
"Nous Sommes La Guerre"	2022	—N/a
"Dreams of Nowhere"	2022	—N/a
"Spirit Of No Return"	2024	—N/a

== Notes ==
- A "Departure Plan" and "Rejection Role" were released together as a double A-side single in Germany.
- B "Exile" and "The Pittsburgh Syndrome" were released together as a double A-side single in Germany.
