= Death Resonance =

Compilation album by Soilwork
- Released: 19 August 2016
- Recorded: 2004−2016
- Studio: Various: Fascination Street Studios (Örebro, Sweden); Black-Out in the Red Room (Landskrona, Sweden); Not Quite Studio (Helsingborg, Sweden); DevLab (Vancouver, Canada); Dug-Out Productions (Uppsala, Sweden)
- Genre: Melodic death metal
- Length: 60:34
- Label: Nuclear Blast
- Producer: Jens Bogren; David Castillo; Johan Örnborg; Linus Corneliusson; Donal Fitsberg; Peter Wichers; Devin Townsend; Daniel Bergstrand; Örjan Örnkloo; Ola Frenning; Klas Ideberg; Peter Wildoer

Soilwork chronology
| The Ride Majestic (2015) | Death Resonance (2016) | Verkligheten (2019) |

Death Resonance is the second compilation album by Swedish melodic death metal band Soilwork, released on 19 August 2016 via Nuclear Blast. The album contains two new songs as well as thirteen remastered versions of B-sides previously unreleased worldwide, including all tracks in Beyond the Infinite EP and bonus tracks in Stabbing the Drama, Sworn to a Great Divide, The Panic Broadcast and The Ride Majestic. The album is the final Soilwork record to credit Dirk Verbeuren on drums.

== Background ==
Frontman Björn "Speed" Strid commented on Death Resonance:

The cover for Death Resonance is made by Mircea Eftemie and in many ways he managed to capture what we went through while recording The Ride Majestic: the sorrow, the close encounter with death, the aftermath and also the existential cogitation that came with it. It links those albums together, even though Death Resonance contains unreleased material from 2005 and forward. The cover almost seems like a link between life and death and not only captures where the band is right now, but also where we've been and what lies ahead."

== Track listing ==
| No. | Title | Lyrics | Music | Length |
|---|---|---|---|---|
| 1. | "Helsinki" | Björn "Speed" Strid | Strid; David Andersson | 4:01 |
| 2. | "Death Resonance" | Strid | Strid | 4:18 |
| 3. | "The End Begins Below the Surface" (from Japanese edition of The Ride Majestic) | Dirk Verbeuren | Verbeuren | 3:12 |
| 4. | "My Nerves, Your Everyday Tool" (from Beyond the Infinite EP) | Strid | Strid | 4:17 |
| 5. | "These Absent Eyes" (from Beyond the Infinite EP) | Andersson | Verbeuren | 3:38 |
| 6. | "Resisting the Current" (from Beyond the Infinite EP) | Andersson | Andersson | 4:28 |
| 7. | "When Sound Collides" (from Beyond the Infinite EP) | Jens Borman | Andersson | 4:32 |
| 8. | "Forever Lost in Vain" (from Beyond the Infinite EP) | Andersson | Strid | 4:39 |
| 9. | "Sweet Demise" (from Limited edition of The Panic Broadcast) | Strid | Peter Wichers; Verbeuren | 4:00 |
| 10. | "Sadistic Lullaby 2010" (re-recorded version; from Japanese edition of The Panic Broadcast) | Strid | Wichers; Ludvig Svartz | 2:56 |
| 11. | "Overclocked" (remastered; from Limited Box edition of Sworn to a Great Divide) | Strid | Ola Frenning; Ola Flink | 3:40 |
| 12. | "Martyr" (remastered; from Limited digipak edition of Sworn to a Great Divide) | Strid | Strid | 3:59 |
| 13. | "Sovereign" (remastered; from Japanese and Limited Box edition of Sworn to a Great Divide) | Strid | Sven Karlsson | 4:24 |
| 14. | "Wherever Thorns May Grow" (remastered; from Limited digipak edition of Stabbing the Drama) | Strid | Strid; Wichers | 4:09 |
| 15. | "Killed by Ignition" (remastered; from Japanese edition of Stabbing the Drama) | Strid | Wichers; Frenning | 4:21 |
| Total length: | | | | 60:34 |

== Personnel ==
Soilwork (new tracks)

- Björn "Speed" Strid – vocals
- Sylvain Coudret – guitars, bass
- David Andersson – guitars, bass
- Sven Karlsson – keyboards
- Dirk Verbeuren – drums

Soilwork (B-sides)

- Björn "Speed" Strid – vocals
- Sylvain Coudret – guitars (tracks 3–10), bass (track 3)
- David Andersson – guitars (tracks 3–8), bass (track 3)
- Peter Wichers – guitars (tracks 9, 10, 14, 15)
- Ola Frenning – guitars (tracks 11–15)
- Daniel Antonsson – guitars (tracks 11–13)
- Ola Flink – bass (tracks 4–15)
- Sven Karlsson – keyboards
- Dirk Verbeuren – drums

Production

- David Castillo – producer (tracks 1–3), engineering (tracks 1–3), mixing (tracks 1–3)
- Jens Bogren – producer (tracks 4–8), mixing (tracks 3, 9, 10), engineering (tracks 9, 10)
- Johan Örnborg – producer assistance (tracks 4–8), mixing (tracks 4–8)
- Linus Corneliusson – producer assistance (tracks 4–8)
- Donal Fitsberg – producer assistance (tracks 4–8)
- Peter Wichers – producer (tracks 9–10), engineering (tracks 9–10)
- Daniel Bergstrand – producer (tracks 10, 14, 15), re-mixing (tracks 14, 15)
- Devin Townsend – producer (vocals, tracks 11–13)
- Ola Frenning – producer (tracks 11–13)
- Klas Ideberg – producer (tracks 11–13)
- Peter Wildoer – producer (tracks 11–13)
- Sebastian Forslund – re-mixing (tracks 11–13)
- Örjan Örnkloo – producer (tracks 14, 15)
- Thomas "PLEC" Johansson – mastering
- Mircea Gabriel Eftemie – artwork, layout
