= Nuclear Blast All-Stars: Out of the Dark =

Out of the Dark

Compilation album by Nuclear Blast All-Stars
- Released: September 21, 2007 (Germany) September 27, 2007 (United States)
- Genre: Melodic death metal Extreme metal Thrash metal
- Label: Nuclear Blast
- Producer: Peter Wichers

Nuclear Blast All-Stars chronology
Into the Light (2007)	Out of the Dark (2007)

Out of the Dark is a two disc compilation album from Nuclear Blast Records to commemorate their 20 years as a record label. Produced by Peter Wichers, who is also the only songwriter on the album, it features a variable collection of "All Stars" much in the same vein as Roadrunner United. The album includes 11 different singers, with Wichers playing bass and guitar, and drums by Dirk Verbeuren and Henry Ranta. It also includes a second disc which includes 10 songs from thrash metal, death metal and black metal bands signed to Nuclear Blast. While its "twin" album Into the Light focuses more on the power metal side of the label, Out of the Dark is rather devoted to the genre of melodic death metal.

== Track listing ==
=== Disc 1 ===
All music is composed by Peter Wichers from Soilwork

No.	Title	Lyrics	Length
1.	"Dysfunctional Hours" (with Anders Fridén of In Flames)	Anders Fridén	04:23
2.	"Schizo" (feat. Peter Tägtgren of Hypocrisy and Pain)	Peter Tägtgren	03:32
3.	"Devotion" (feat. Jari Mäenpää of Wintersun)	Jukka Koskinen	03:40
4.	"The Overshadowing" (feat. Christian Älvestam formerly of Scar Symmetry)	Henrik Ohlsson	03:43
5.	"Paper Trail" (feat. John Bush formerly of Anthrax)	John Bush	04:19
6.	"The Dawn of All" (feat. Björn "Speed" Strid of Soilwork)	Björn Strid	04:10
7.	"Cold Is My Vengeance" (feat. Maurizio Iacono of Kataklysm)	Maurizio Iacono	03:46
8.	"My Name Is Fate" (feat. Mark Osegueda of Death Angel)	Mark Osgueda	04:02
9.	"The Gilded Dagger" (feat. Richard Sjunnesson and Roland Johansson; both formerly of Sonic Syndicate)	Richard Sjunnesson	04:30
10.	"Closer to the Edge" (feat. Guillaume Bideau of Mnemic)	Guillaume Bideau	04:36
Total length:			40:48

=== Disc 2 ===
1. Dimmu Borgir – The Heretic Hammer (US Bonus "In Sorte Diaboli") (04:38)
2. Immortal – Tyrants (06:18)
3. Nile – As He Creates, So He Destroys (04:38)
4. Exodus – Purge the World (Japan Bonus "Shovel Headed Kill Machine") (04:02)
5. Anthrax - Ghost (01:56)
6. Meshuggah – Futile Bread Machine (Campfire Version) (Taken from "The True Human Design" EP) (03:30)
7. Chimaira - Kingdom of Heartache (Japan Bonus "Resurrection") (04:09)
8. All Shall Perish – Prisoner of War (04:44)
9. Agnostic Front – All is Not Forgotten (01:55)
10. Threat Signal – Counterbalance (05:39)

Total length: 41:22

=== Nuclear Blast America Version ===
- Track 1 on disc 2 is Dimmu Borgir - "The Ancestral Fever" (European Bonus "In Sorte Diaboli") (05:51)
- Track 5 on disc 2 is Bleed the Sky - "The Martyr" (05:51)
- Track 7 on disc 2 is EPICA - "Replica" (Fear Factory cover) (04:10)

== Personnel ==
- Peter Wichers - bass, guitars, keyboards
- Henry Ranta - drums (1, 2, 5, 6, 8)
- Dirk Verbeuren - drums (3, 4, 7, 9, 10)
- Mattias Nilsson - shakers, tambourine (5)
