= Panic Broadcast =

Panic Broadcast may refer to:

- The War of the Worlds (radio drama)
- The Panic Broadcast, a 2010 album by Soilwork
