= The Early Chapters =

EP by Soilwork
- Released: 20 January 2004
- Genre: Melodic death metal
- Length: 24:35
- Label: Listenable
- Producer: Daniel Bergstrand

Soilwork chronology
Figure Number Five (2003)	The Early Chapters (2004)	Stabbing the Drama (2005)

The Early Chapters is the first EP by Swedish melodic death metal band Soilwork. It was released by Listenable Records on 20 January 2004. It features two cover songs of the bands Deep Purple and Mercyful Fate, the original demo recording of "Shadow Child," the bonus track from their second album, plus a live song which was a bonus track from their first album, Burn and Disintegrated Skies are Japanese bonus tracks on their first album, Egypt was a bonus track on some versions of The Chainheart Machine.

It was given a rating of one and a half stars by AllMusic.

== Track listing ==
No.	Title	Length
1.	"Burn" (Deep Purple cover)	5:44
2.	"Disintegrated Skies"	3:59
3.	"Egypt" (Mercyful Fate cover)	5:22
4.	"Shadow Child" (demo version)	4:50
5.	"The Aardvark Trail" (live)	4:40

== Credits ==
- Björn "Speed" Strid − vocals
- Peter Wichers − guitars
- Ola Frenning − guitars
- Ola Flink − bass
- Sven Karlsson − keyboards
- Henry Ranta − drums
