= Act of Denial =

Death metal supergroup

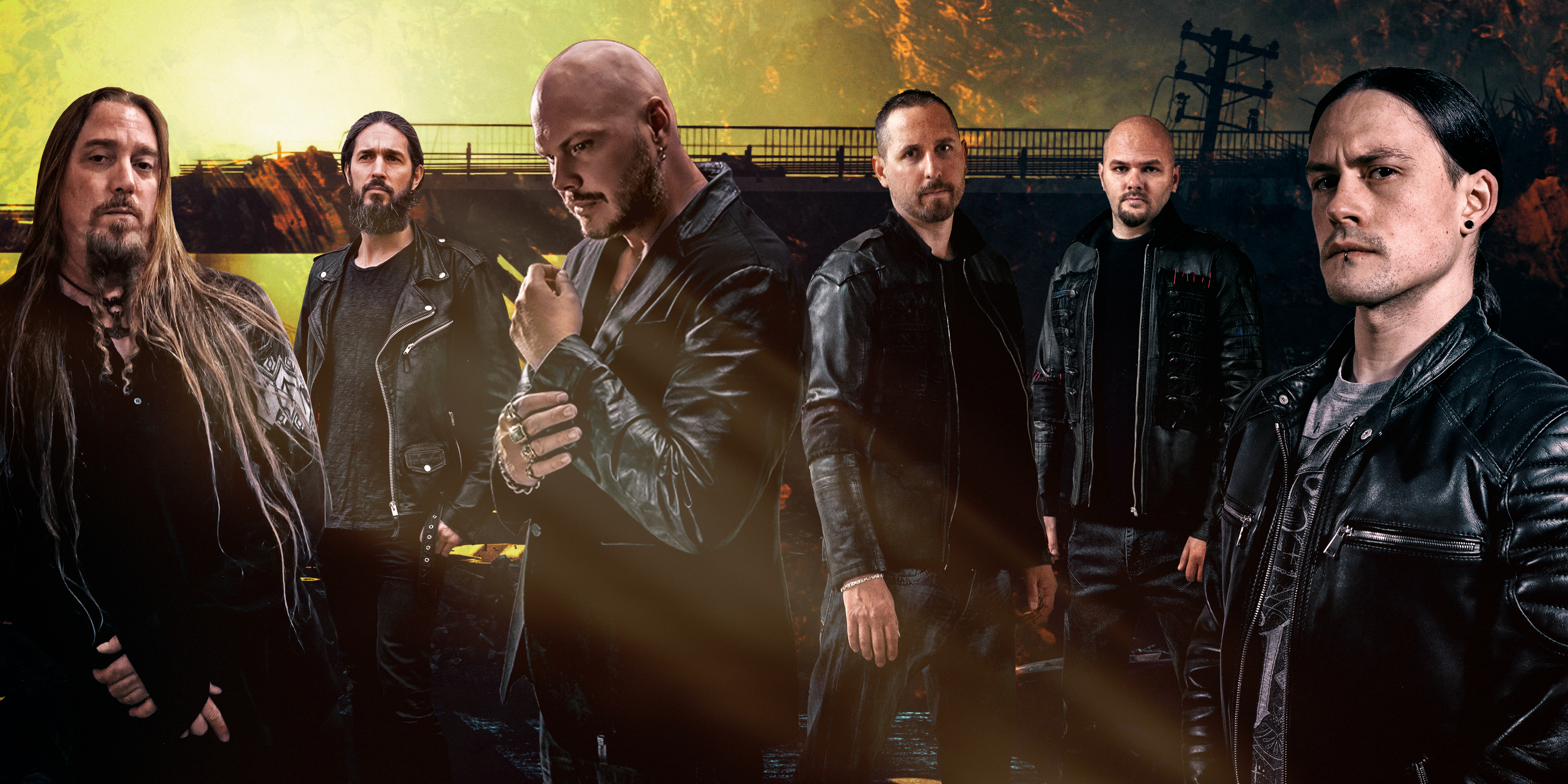
- Act of Denial in 2020

Background information
- Origin: Croatia, Sweden, Austria, United States
- Genres: Melodic death metal
- Years active: 2020–present
- Labels: Golden Robot, Crusader
- Members: Björn Strid; Voi Cox; Luger; Steve Di Giorgio; Kerim "Krimh" Lechner; John Lönnmyr

Act of Denial is an international melodic death metal supergroup formed in 2020. Its members are vocalist Björn Strid (Soilwork), guitarist, songwriter, and producer Voi Cox (Koziak, Victim), lyricist and guitarist Luger (Benighted, Koziak), bassist Steve Di Giorgio (Death, Testament), drummer Kerim Lechner (Septicflesh), and keyboardist John Lönnmyr (The Night Flight Orchestra).

The band's debut album, Negative, was released on August 13, 2021, preceded by five singles: "Puzzle Heart", "Controlled", "Down That Line", "Slave" and "Your Dark Desires". The album features guest appearances from Ron "Bumblefoot" Thal (Guns N' Roses, Sons of Apollo), Mattias IA Eklundh (Freak Kitchen), Bobby Koelble (Death) and Peter Wichers (Soilwork, Warrel Dane).

In March 2022, Act of Denial announced they had begun working on their second studio album. The album's first single, "Unbury the Hatchet," was released to streaming services on February 4, 2024.

== Discography ==
=== Albums ===
- Negative (2021)

=== Singles ===
- "Puzzle Heart" (2020)
- "Controlled" (2020)
- "Down That Line" (2020)
- "Slave" (2021)
- "Your Dark Desires" (2021)
- "Unbury the Hatchet" (2024)
