= Bent Sea =

Grindcore band

- Origin: International (Wilrijk, Belgium / Los Angeles, US)
- Genres: Grindcore
- Years active: 2011–present
- Members: Dirk Verbeuren; Sven de Caluwe; Shane Embury
- Past members: Devin Townsend

Bent Sea is a Belgian/UK grindcore band formed in January 2011 by drummer Dirk Verbeuren (Megadeth, Soilwork, Scarve). After writing and recording a number of songs, Verbeuren (guitar, drums) enlisted vocalist Sven de Caluwe of Belgian death metal band Aborted (vocals) and multi-instrumentalist Devin Townsend (bass) for the Townsend-produced debut EP Noistalgia which was released as a digital download on November 11, 2011, and later on cassette format by Tankcrimes.

In 2012, bass player Shane Embury (Napalm Death, Brujeria, Venomous Concept, Lock Up) replaced Townsend. The trio recorded a batch of new songs written and produced by Verbeuren. The first of these recordings, "Partners In Grind" appeared on Double Penetration, a free digital split single with Swedish death metal act Torture Division. Animalist/Usurpress, a split EP with Swedish death/crust act Usurpress saw the light of day in early 2014 on CD via SelfMadeGod Records and on 10 inch vinyl via Doomentia Records. Ascend/Descend, a split EP entitled with Cleveland grindcore band To Dust was released in July 2016 on 12 inch vinyl by Give Praise Records.

Guitarist Sylvain Coudret (Soilwork, Scarve) recorded guest leads on the songs "Dead Meat" (Noistalgia), "Fashion Victims" (Animalist), "To The Extreme" and "Gluttonous Death" (Ascend).

== Members ==
- Dirk Verbeuren – guitar, drums (2011–present)
- Sven de Caluwé – vocals (2011–present)
- Shane Embury – bass (2012–present)

=== Former members ===
- Devin Townsend – bass (2011–2012)

== Discography ==
- Noistalgia (digital EP/cassette) (November 11, 2011)
- Double Penetration (digital split single with Torture Division) (July 12, 2013)
- Animalist (split LP/CD with Usurpress) (January 6, 2014)
- Ascend (split LP with To Dust) (July 20. 2016)
- Partners in Grind (single) (April 2, 2020)
- Instagrind (single) (May 1, 2020)
