= Beyond the Infinite (EP) =

EP by Soilwork
- Released: 24 September 2014
- Recorded: August–September 2012
- Studio: Fascination Street Recordings, Örebro, Sweden
- Genre: Melodic death metal, alternative metal
- Length: 21:44
- Label: Victor Entertainment
- Producer: Jens Bogren, Soilwork

Soilwork chronology
The Living Infinite (2013)	Beyond the Infinite (2014)	Live in the Heart of Helsinki (2015)

Beyond the Infinite is the second EP by Swedish melodic death metal band Soilwork. It was released by Victor Entertainment on 24 September 2014. It contains five unreleased tracks from The Living Infinite sessions and was mixed and mastered at Fascination Street by Johan Örnborg. This release is for Asia only and no plans have been made to release the EP in current form outside of Asia. The tracks have since been included in the 2016 compilation album Death Resonance.

== Track listing ==
No.	Title	Lyrics	Music	Length
1.	"My Nerves, Your Everyday Tool"	Björn Strid	Strid	4:17
2.	"These Absent Eyes"	David Andersson	Dirk Verbeuren	3:40
3.	"Resisting the Current"	Andersson	Andersson	4:28
4.	"When Sound Collides"	Jens Broman	Andersson	4:33
5.	"Forever Lost in Vain"	Andersson	Strid	4:46
Total length:				21:44

== Credits ==
Writing, performance and production credits are adapted from the album liner notes.

=== Personnel ===
Soilwork

- Björn Strid – vocals
- David Andersson – guitar
- Sylvain Coudret – guitar
- Ola Flink – bass
- Sven Karlsson – keyboards
- Dirk Verbeuren – drums

Production

- Soilwork – production
- Jens Bogren – production
- Johan Örnborg – production assistance, mixing, mastering
- Linus Corneliusson and Donal Fitsberg – production assistance

Artwork and design

- Mircea Gabriel Eftemie (Mnemic, eftemie.com) – album cover
- Hannah Verbeuren (hannahvphotography.com) – photography

=== Studios ===
- Fascination Street Recordings, Örebro, Sweden – recording, mixing, mastering
