= Verkligheten =

- Digital and vinyl edition cover

Studio album by Soilwork
- Released: 11 January 2019
- Recorded: April–August 2018
- Studio: The Panic Room (Skövde, Sweden); Nordic Sound Lab (Skara, Sweden); Moon Unit Studio (Helsinki, Finland); Björngrottan Vocal Studios (Trollbäcken, Sweden)
- Genre: Melodic death metal
- Length: 50:17
- Label: Nuclear Blast
- Producer: Thomas "PLEC" Johansson

Soilwork chronology
Death Resonance (2016)	Verkligheten (2019)	Övergivenheten (2022)

Alternative cover
- Digipak edition cover

Singles from Verkligheten
- 1. "Arrival" Released: 12 October 2018; 2. "Full Moon Shoals" Released: 26 October 2018; 3. "Stålfågel" Released: 21 December 2018

Professional ratings
Review scores
Source	Rating
Metal Hammer (GER)	5.5/7 stars

Verkligheten (English: The Reality) is the eleventh studio album by Swedish melodic death metal band Soilwork, released on 11 January 2019 via Nuclear Blast. It is the first album to feature drummer Bastian Thusgaard as the replacement of longtime member Dirk Verbeuren. The album's release also marks the longest gap between Soilwork studio albums to date, with their previous album, The Ride Majestic, having been released nearly three and a half years earlier.

Loudwire named it one of the 50 best metal albums of 2019.

== Background and recording ==
In a February 2017 interview with KaaosTV, frontman Björn "Speed" Strid revealed that the band would "slowly get into writing mode" for the follow-up to The Ride Majestic during the summer and enter the studio later that year. On 20 April 2017, the band officially announced Bastian Thusgaard as the permanent replacement to Dirk Verbeuren, who had departed from the band to join Megadeth in July 2016. The band also added that Thusgaard would be involved in the writing process of the new album.

On 4 April 2018, the band officially entered Nordic Sound Lab Studios in Skara, Sweden and the Panic Room in Skövde, Sweden with producer Thomas "PLEC" Johansson to begin recording their new album. The recording of the album was finished as of September 2018, scheduled for a tentative early 2019 release.

Strid commented on the new album:

The recording sessions for this album have been different from anything we've done before. Everyone's been very involved in the whole process, and we've allowed ourselves to experiment more and take more chances sonically. Our drummer Bastian Thusgaard, who hasn't recorded with us previously, brought another dimension to our sound, and he made the rest of us step up our game as well. And working with producer Thomas "PLEC" Johansson (The Panic Room) has been a real pleasure. Even though we've been through a lot over the past years, we feel more like a unit than we've done for a long time. On this new album we have gone back to classic heavy metal basics but with a twist of our own legacy of sound, with soaring melancholic melodies at a sometimes-furious tempo and great diversity. People will recognize the vibe that we've had on the latest two albums, but we feel that we've taken our sound even further, with more energy, darker elements but uplifting structure.

== Release ==
On 4 October 2018, the band posted an official teaser video for "Arrival", the first single of the new album. On 12 October 2018, the band revealed the title, tracklist and artwork of their new album Verkligheten, which would be released on 11 January 2019 via Nuclear Blast. A visualizer clip of "Arrival" was also available for streaming on the same day. On 26 October 2018, the band released the music video for the song "Full Moon Shoals". An animated music video directed by Elia Cristofoli for the song "Stålfågel" was released on 21 December 2018. The music video for the song "Witan" was available for streaming on 11 January 2019.

== Track listing ==
All tracks are written by David Andersson, except where noted.

No.	Title	Lyrics	Music	Length
1.	"Verkligheten" (instrumental)			1:44
2.	"Arrival"	Björn "Speed" Strid		3:47
3.	"Bleeder Despoiler"			3:36
4.	"Full Moon Shoals"	Strid	Strid	4:46
5.	"The Nurturing Glance"			5:24
6.	"When the Universe Spoke"			5:22
7.	"Stålfågel"			4:25
8.	"The Wolves Are Back in Town"			3:24
9.	"Witan"	Strid	Strid	3:48
10.	"The Ageless Whisper"	Strid		5:01
11.	"Needles and Kin" (featuring Tomi Joutsen)		Strid	4:57
12.	"You Aquiver" (featuring Dave Sheldon)	Strid	Strid	4:03
Total length:				50:17

Underworld – Limited digipak, vinyl and Japanese edition bonus EP
No.	Title	Lyrics	Music	Length
1.	"Summerburned and Winterblown"			4:15
2.	"In This Master's Tale"	Strid	Strid	5:03
3.	"The Undying Eye"			4:33
4.	"Needles and Kin" (original version)		Strid	4:59
Total length:				18:50

iTunes edition
No.	Title	Length
7.	"Stålfågel" (featuring Alissa White-Gluz)	4:25

== Personnel ==
Soilwork

- Björn "Speed" Strid – vocals
- Sylvain Coudret – guitars
- David Andersson – guitars, bass, piano
- Sven Karlsson – keyboards
- Bastian Thusgaard – drums, percussion

Additional musicians

- Alissa White-Gluz – vocals (track 7, in iTunes edition)
- Tomi Joutsen – vocals (track 11)
- Dave Sheldon – vocals (track 12)
- Taylor Nordberg – backing vocals (tracks 1–12, tracks 1, 3, 4 in bonus EP)
- Åsa-Hanna Carlsson – cello (tracks 2, 3, 4, 6, 10, 11)

Production and design

- Thomas "PLEC" Johansson – production, recording, mixing, mastering
- Björn "Speed" Strid – production (vocals), recording (vocals)
- Jan Rechberger – recording (Joutsen's vocals)
- Viktor Brunö – mixing (assistant), mastering (assistant)
- Valnoir – cover art, layout, artwork (additional), logo
- Tobias Green – design
- Therés Stephansdotter Björk – photography

== Charts ==
Chart (2019)	Peak position
Austrian Albums (Ö3 Austria)	19
Belgian Albums (Ultratop Flanders)	187
Belgian Albums (Ultratop Wallonia)	120
Finnish Albums (Suomen virallinen lista)	35
German Albums (Offizielle Top 100)	10
Japanese Albums (Oricon)	86
Swiss Albums (Schweizer Hitparade)	25
UK Independent Albums (OCC)	15
UK Rock & Metal Albums (OCC)	5
