= The Living Infinite =

Studio album by Soilwork
- Released: 27 February 2013
- Genre: Melodic death metal
- Length: 84:19
- Label: Nuclear Blast
- Producer: Jens Bogren, Soilwork

Soilwork chronology
The Sledgehammer Files: The Best of Soilwork 1998-2008 (2010)	The Living Infinite (2013)	Beyond the Infinite (2014)

The Living Infinite is the ninth studio album by Swedish melodic death metal band Soilwork, released on 27 February 2013 in Asia, 1 March 2013 in Europe, on 4 March 2013 in the UK and on 5 March 2013 in the US. It is the band's first double album. It is also the first Soilwork release to feature guitarist David Andersson; founding guitarist Peter Wichers left Soilwork for the second time in 2012, making this the second album to not feature him. This also marks the band's last album with longtime bassist Ola Flink who parted ways with the band right before the recording of the next album The Ride Majestic.

== Reception ==
=== Critical reception ===
Professional ratings
Aggregate scores
Source	Rating
Metacritic	84/100
Review scores
Source	Rating
About.com	4/5 stars
AllMusic	4/5 stars
Blabbermouth	9.5/10
Decibel	6/10 stars
Exclaim!	9/10
Metal Forces	9/10
Metal Hammer	favorable
Metal Storm	favorable
Sputnikmusic	4.3/5

The album received high acclaim. Trey Spencer of Sputnikmusic gave the album a "Superb" rating of 4.3/5, praising the album's heavier sound, dynamic songwriting and melodic, progressive content. Calling it Soilwork's "strongest, most consistent album to date", he stated that the band "have simultaneously stepped back to their past while maintaining their current sound, but they have also diversified their formula more than ever before – and they did so without a single filler track." However, writing for Decibel Magazine, Adrien Begrand stated that "the primary flaw of The Living Infinite is its lack of variety, the cookie-cutter nature of the songwriting wearing thin after the halfway point".

=== Commercial performance ===
In the United States, the album debuted at No. 60 on the Billboard 200, and No. 20 on the Top Rock Albums, selling 7,800 copies in its first week. The album has sold 26,000 copies in the US as of August 2015.

== Track listing ==
All lyrics are written by Björn Strid, except where noted.

Disc 1
No.	Title	Lyrics	Music	Length
1.	"Spectrum of Eternity"		Strid; David Andersson	4:01
2.	"Memories Confined"		Sven Karlsson	3:25
3.	"This Momentary Bliss"		Strid; Andersson	3:45
4.	"Tongue"		Andersson	4:17
5.	"The Living Infinite I"		Strid	3:50
6.	"Let the First Wave Rise"	Andersson	Andersson	2:52
7.	"Vesta"		Strid	4:18
8.	"Realm of the Wasted"		Sylvain Coudret	4:29
9.	"The Windswept Mercy"		Strid	4:14
10.	"Whispers and Lights"		Andersson	5:09
Total length:				40:20

Disc 2
No.	Title	Lyrics	Music	Length
1.	"Entering Aeons" (instrumental)		Andersson	2:34
2.	"Long Live the Misanthrope"		Andersson	5:26
3.	"Drowning with Silence"		Andersson	4:28
4.	"Antidotes in Passing"		Andersson	4:15
5.	"Leech"		Coudret	4:20
6.	"The Living Infinite II"		Strid	5:39
7.	"Loyal Shadow" (instrumental)		Coudret	2:34
8.	"Rise Above the Sentiment"		Strid	4:03
9.	"Parasite Blues"		Strid; Andersson	5:16
10.	"Owls Predict, Oracles Stand Guard"	Ola Flink	Karlsson	5:24
Total length:				43:59

== Credits ==
Writing, performance and production credits are adapted from the album liner notes.

=== Personnel ===
Soilwork

- Björn Strid – vocals
- Sylvain Coudret – guitars
- David Andersson – guitars
- Ola Flink – bass
- Sven Karlsson – keyboards
- Dirk Verbeuren – drums

Guest musicians

- Justin Sullivan – vocals on "The Windswept Mercy"

Additional musicians

- Hanna Carlsson – cello on "Spectrum of Eternity", "The Living Infinite II"; piano on "Spectrum of Eternity"

Production

- Soilwork – production
- Jens Bogren – production, mixing, mastering
- Johan Örnborg – production assistance
- Linus Corneliusson – production assistance

Artwork and design

- Mircea Gabriel Eftemie (Mnemic, eftemie.com) – album cover
- Hannah Verbeuren (hannahvphotography.com) – photography

=== Studios ===
- Fascination Street – mixing, mastering

== Charts ==
Chart	Peak position
Austrian Albums (Ö3 Austria)	22
Belgian Albums (Ultratop Flanders)	115
Belgian Albums (Ultratop Wallonia)	97
Finnish Albums (Suomen virallinen lista)	10
French Albums (SNEP)	128
German Albums (Offizielle Top 100)	17
Japanese Albums (Oricon)	61
Swedish Albums (Sverigetopplistan)	19
Swiss Albums (Schweizer Hitparade)	36
UK Albums (OCC)	188
UK Independent Albums (OCC)	30
UK Rock & Metal Albums (OCC)	9
US Billboard 200	60
US Independent Albums (Billboard)	11
US Top Hard Rock Albums (Billboard)	2
US Top Rock Albums (Billboard)	20
