= Sworn to a Great Divide =

- Cover art by Seth Siro Anton

Studio album by Soilwork
- Released: 19 October 2007
- Recorded: 3 February – 26 May 2007 at Not Quite Studios, Helsingborg, Sweden (except vocals)
- Genre: Melodic death metal, alternative metal, metalcore
- Length: 41:57
- Label: Nuclear Blast
- Producer: Peter Wildoer, Klas Ideberg & Soilwork

Soilwork chronology
Stabbing the Drama (2005)	Sworn to a Great Divide (2007)	The Panic Broadcast (2010)

Professional ratings
Review scores
Source	Rating
AllMusic	3.5/5 stars
Stylus	(B−)

Sworn to a Great Divide is the seventh studio album by Swedish melodic death metal band Soilwork. The album was released on 19 October 2007 for Europe and on 23 October 2007 for the US, both through Nuclear Blast. Everything aside from vocals was recorded at Not Quite Studios in Helsingborg. This is the only album to include Daniel Antonsson on guitar who replaced founding member Peter Wichers after his late 2005 departure. It is also the last album to feature long-time guitarist Ola Frenning who left Soilwork in February 2008.

Sworn to a Great Divide was Soilwork's biggest commercial success at the time of its release, selling approximately 5,000 copies in its first week in the U.S., charting at No. 148, and reaching No. 2 on the Top Heatseekers. The album in its entirety was put on Soilwork's MySpace on 10 October 2007.

Due to other commitments, Devin Townsend only produced the vocal tracks. The remaining production duties were in the hands of Ola Frenning and Peter Wildoer. While speculation led many fans to believe this would be a sequel to the intense Natural Born Chaos, Sworn to a Great Divide instead continued the band's more commercial progression, further deviating from the bands melodic death metal roots.

== Promotion ==
"Exile" would become the album's single released on 3 October 2007. A music video was made for the song and shot in Gothenburg. The song was also made available to download for use in Guitar Hero II on Xbox 360 on 15 October 2007. The album's title track would also find significant airplay on heavy metal satellite radio following its release.

== Reception ==
Sworn to a Great Divide has been treated to largely positive reviews. AllMusic's Thom Jurek noted that despite upset expectations of a stylistic sequel to Natural Born Chaos, the album has "absolutely nothing to complain about." Jurek praised vocalist Björn Strid as well as the album's layered and melodic style. He concluded by calling it "well done, carefully executed, and aggressive enough to satisfy fans, while offering some new textures, spaces, and compositional elements to add depth and dimension to an ever-evolving sound."

The album received perhaps a more extreme review from Stylus which considers Soilwork's style a heavier incarnation of Nirvana and modern emo groups. It also speculates the song title "20 More Miles" as a possible "marketing move." Yet, in the same hand, the review considers Soilwork to "sound slightly 'more metal' than before." Sworn to a Great Divide is also praised for its catchy hooks, guitar harmonies, and Strid's outstanding singing abilities. It ends by stating, "That this falls under metal, as does Slayer and Sunn O))), is a credit to the music's breadth and resiliency."

== Track listing ==
All lyrics are written by Björn "Speed" Strid.

No.	Title	Music	Length
1.	"Sworn to a Great Divide"	Ola Frenning; Daniel Antonsson	3:33
2.	"Exile"	Strid; Frenning	3:49
3.	"Breeding Thorns"	Frenning	3:55
4.	"Your Beloved Scapegoat"	Frenning	3:58
5.	"The Pittsburgh Syndrome"	Strid; Antonsson	2:46
6.	"I, Vermin"	Frenning	3:38
7.	"Light Discovering Darkness"	Frenning	3:50
8.	"As the Sleeper Awakes"	Strid; Antonsson	4:18
9.	"Silent Bullet"	Frenning	3:26
10.	"Sick Heart River"	Karlsson	4:12
11.	"20 More Miles"	Strid; Antonsson	4:38

Japanese edition CD+DVD bonus tracks
No.	Title	Music	Length
12.	"Martyr" (also in limited CD+DVD digipak edition)	Strid	4:17
13.	"Sovereign"	Karlsson	4:24

Limited Box edition bonus CD
No.	Title	Music	Length
12.	"Overclocked"	Frenning; Ola Flink	3:41
13.	"Sovereign"	Karlsson	4:24

Limited edition bonus DVD
No.	Title	Album	Length
1.	"Studio Report – Not Quite Studio"
2.	"The DevLab"
3.	"Exile" (video clip)
4.	"Follow the Hollow" (live at Z7 in Pratteln, Switzerland)	Natural Born Chaos
5.	"Rejection Role" (live at Z7 in Pratteln, Switzerland)	Figure Number Five
6.	"One with the Flies" (live at Z7 in Pratteln, Switzerland)	Stabbing the Drama
7.	"Bastard Chain" (live at Z7 in Pratteln, Switzerland)	A Predator's Portrait
8.	"Nerve" (live at Z7 in Pratteln, Switzerland)	Stabbing the Drama
9.	"Stalemate" (live at Z7 in Pratteln, Switzerland)	Stabbing the Drama
10.	"Millionflame" (live at Z7 in Pratteln, Switzerland)	The Chainheart Machine
11.	"As We Speak" (live at Z7 in Pratteln, Switzerland)	Natural Born Chaos

== Release history ==
Country	Date
Europe	19 October 2007
United States	23 October 2007

== Chart positions ==
Chart (2007)	Peak position
Finnish album charts	19
Swedish album charts	25
German album charts	37
Austrian album charts	57
Swiss album charts	74
French album charts	136
U.S. Billboard 200	148

== Personnel ==
Soilwork

- Björn "Speed" Strid − vocals
- Sven Karlsson − keyboards, sampling
- Daniel Antonsson − lead and rhythm guitar
- Ola Frenning − lead and rhythm guitar
- Dirk Verbeuren − drums
- Ola Flink − bass guitar

Guest

- Per Aldeheim – arrangements on "Light Discovers Darkness"
