= The Sledgehammer Files: The Best of Soilwork 1998–2008 =

Compilation album by Soilwork
- Released: 20 July 2010
- Recorded: 1998–2008
- Genre: Melodic death metal, alternative metal
- Label: Avalon Marquee Records

Soilwork chronology
The Panic Broadcast (2010)	The Sledgehammer Files: The Best of Soilwork 1998–2008 (2010)	The Living Infinite (2013)

The Sledgehammer Files: The Best of Soilwork 1998–2008 is the first compilation album by Swedish melodic death metal band Soilwork, released in 2010 on Avalon Marquee Records.

== Track listing ==
1. Sadistic Lullabye [remastered] – 2:55
2. Steelbath Suicide [remastered] – 2:55
3. The Chainheart Machine [remastered] – 4:02
4. Bulletbeast [remastered] – 4:38
5. Generation Speedkill [remastered] – 4:28
6. Bastard Chain – 4:03
7. Needlefeast – 4:07
8. Grand Failure Anthem – 5:21
9. Follow the Hollow – 4:03
10. As We Speak – 3:41
11. Black Star Deceiver – 4:42
12. Rejection Role – 3:35
13. Figure Number Five – 3:10
14. Light the Torch – 3:39
15. Stabbing the Drama – 4:34
16. One with the Flies – 4:01
17. Nerve – 3:39
18. Sworn to a Great Divide – 3:31
19. Exile [Orchestral Mix] – 3:45

== Personnel ==
Soilwork

- Björn "Speed" Strid – vocals
- Ola Flink – bass
- Peter Wichers – guitars (tracks 1–17)
- Daniel Antonsson – guitars (tracks 18–19)
- Ludvig Svartz – guitars (tracks 1–2)
- Ola Frenning – guitars (tracks 3–19)
- Carlos Del Olmo Holmberg – keyboards (tracks 1–8)
- Sven Karlsson – keyboards (tracks 9–19)
- Jimmy Persson – drums (tracks 1–2)
- Henry Ranta – drums (tracks 3–14)
- Dirk Verbeuren – drums (tracks 15–19)
