= Övergivenheten =

Studio album by Soilwork
- Released: 19 August 2022
- Recorded: January – December 2021
- Studio: Nordic Sound Lab (Skara, Sweden)
- Genre: Melodic death metal
- Length: 65:19
- Label: Nuclear Blast
- Producer: Thomas "PLEC" Johansson

Soilwork chronology
Verkligheten (2019)	Övergivenheten (2022)

Singles from Övergivenheten
- 1. "Övergivenheten" Released: 13 May 2022; 2. "Nous Sommes La Guerre" Released: 17 June 2022; 3. "Dreams of Nowhere" Released: 15 July 2022

Professional ratings
Review scores
Source	Rating
AngryMetalGuy	2.5/5 stars
Distorted Sound	8/10
Metal Injection	7.5/10
Sputnikmusic	3.6/5 stars

Övergivenheten (English: The Abandonment) is the twelfth studio album by Swedish melodic death metal band Soilwork, released on 19 August 2022 via Nuclear Blast. It marks the first album with new bassist Rasmus Ehrnborn who joined as a touring member for the previous album Verkligheten cycle and became a permanent member in 2022, also making this album the first recorded as a six-piece since 2013's The Living Infinite. This was the last album to feature guitarist David Andersson who died on 14 September 2022.

== Track listing ==
All tracks are written by David Andersson, except where noted.

Övergivenheten track listing
No.	Title	Lyrics	Music	Guitar solo	Length
1.	"Övergivenheten"	Strid; Andersson	Björn "Speed" Strid	Andersson	5:46
2.	"Nous sommes la guerre" ("We Are the War")			Andersson	6:53
3.	"Electric Again"			Andersson	4:23
4.	"Valleys of Gloam"	Strid	Strid	Andersson	4:11
5.	"Is It in Your Darkness"	Strid	Strid		4:05
6.	"Vultures"		Sven Karlsson	Andersson	5:48
7.	"Morgongåva / Stormfågel" (“Morning Gift/Stormbird”, instrumental)				1:33
8.	"Death, I Hear You Calling"			Andersson	4:41
9.	"This Godless Universe"				4:42
10.	"Dreams of Nowhere"	Strid	Strid		4:29
11.	"The Everlasting Flame" (instrumental)		Strid		1:07
12.	"Golgata" (featuring Dave Sheldon)			Andersson	4:59
13.	"Harvest Spine" (featuring Dave Sheldon)	Strid	Strid	Sylvain Coudret	5:10
14.	"On the Wings of a Goddess Through Flaming Sheets of Rain"			Andersson	7:32
Total length:					65:19

== Personnel ==
Soilwork

- Björn "Speed" Strid – vocals
- Sylvain Coudret – guitars
- David Andersson – guitars
- Sven Karlsson – keyboards
- Bastian Thusgaard – drums
- Rasmus Ehrnborn – bass

Additional musicians

- Rachel Hall – violin, cello
- Johan Randén – acoustic guitar, banjo
- Hanna Carlsson – cello
- Morgan Schrantz – voice
- Nils Karlsén – voice on track 14
- Daniel Fäldt – kaval

== Charts ==
Chart performance for Övergivenheten
Chart (2022)	Peak position
Australian Hitseekers Albums (ARIA)	6
Austrian Albums (Ö3 Austria)	35
Belgian Albums (Ultratop Flanders)	123
Belgian Albums (Ultratop Wallonia)	115
Finnish Albums (Suomen virallinen lista)	15
German Albums (Offizielle Top 100)	15
Japanese Albums (Oricon)	66
Japanese Hot Albums (Billboard Japan)	87
Scottish Albums (OCC)	86
Swedish Albums (Sverigetopplistan)	29
Swiss Albums (Schweizer Hitparade)	20
UK Album Downloads (OCC)	69
UK Independent Albums (OCC)	20
UK Rock & Metal Albums (OCC)	7
