= Mannah =

Mannah is a surname of Arabic origin, which means "giver". It may refer to:

- Jon Mannah (1989–2013), Australian rugby league player
- Martyns Mannah (born 1975), Nigerian politician
- Tim Mannah (born 1988), Australian rugby league player

== See also ==
- Manna (disambiguation)
