= A Predator's Portrait =

Studio album by Soilwork
- Released: 19 February 2001
- Recorded: September–October 2000
- Studios: Studio Fredman and DHS-Studios
- Genre: Melodic death metal
- Length: 45:43
- Label: Nuclear Blast
- Producers: Fredrik Nordström, Soilwork

Soilwork chronology
The Chainheart Machine (1999)	A Predator's Portrait (2001)	Natural Born Chaos (2002)

Professional ratings
Review scores
Source	Rating
AllMusic	link

A Predator's Portrait is the third studio album by Swedish melodic death metal band Soilwork. It was released on 19 February 2001, and was reissued on 15 October 2013 in the U.S. and 18 October 2013 in Europe. This is the last album to feature Carlos Del Olmo Holmberg on keyboards. According to Nielsen Soundscan, the album sold 6326 copies in the US as of 2002.

This is the first album where Björn "Speed" Strid started utilizing clean vocals mixed with his traditional screaming style and the first Soilwork release to be on Nuclear Blast. The album was recorded at the same studio and at the same time that Opeth recorded their album Blackwater Park.

"Shadowchild" is a rerecording from their reissue of The Chainheart Machine.

== Track listing ==
All music is composed by Soilwork.

No.	Title	Lyrics	Music	Length
1.	"Bastard Chain"	Björn "Speed" Strid	Peter Wichers; Ola Frenning	4:02
2.	"Like the Average Stalker"	Strid; Wichers; Jens Broman; Henry Ranta	Strid; Wichers; Frenning	4:30
3.	"Needlefeast"	Strid; Wichers; Broman; Ranta	Wichers	4:06
4.	"Neurotica Rampage"	Strid; Wichers; Broman; Ranta	Wichers; Frenning	4:43
5.	"The Analyst"	Strid	Wichers; Frenning	4:42
6.	"Grand Failure Anthem"	Strid	Wichers; Frenning	5:20
7.	"Structure Divine"	Strid	Wichers; Frenning	4:06
8.	"Shadowchild"	Strid; Wichers; Broman; Ranta	Strid; Wichers; Carlos Del Olmo Holmberg	4:38
9.	"Final Fatal Force"	Strid	Wichers; Frenning	4:59
10.	"A Predator's Portrait"	Strid	Wichers; Frenning	4:31

Japanese edition & 2003 re-issue bonus track
No.	Title	Lyrics	Music	Length
11.	"Asylum Dance"	Strid	Wichers; Frenning	4:16

2013 re-issue bonus tracks
No.	Title	Lyrics	Music	Length
11.	"Asylum Dance"	Strid	Wichers; Frenning	4:16
12.	"Like the Average Stalker" (Live from the "2013 North American Infinity Tour")			4:43
13.	"Final Fatal Force" (Live from the "2013 North American Infinity Tour")			5:20

== Personnel ==
=== Soilwork ===
- Björn "Speed" Strid − vocals
- Peter Wichers − lead guitar
- Ola Frenning − rhythm guitar
- Ola Flink − bass
- Carlos Del Olmo Holmberg − keyboards
- Henry Ranta − drums

=== Guests ===
- Mattias Eklundh − guitar solo on "Needlefeast"
- Jens Broman – co-writing
- Eskil Simonsson − samples on "Grand Failure Anthem"
- Mikael Åkerfeldt − co-vocals on "A Predator's Portrait"

=== Additional Personnel on the Deluxe Edition Bonus Tracks ===
- Sven Karlsson – keyboards
- Dirk Verbeuren – drums
- Sylvain Coudret – guitars
- David Andersson – guitars

=== Production ===
- Mixed at Studio Fredman
- Drums recorded in DHS-Studios
- Mastered at The Mastering Room
- Carlos Del Olmo Holmberg − artwork
