= Figure Number Five =

Studio album by Soilwork
- Released: 22 April 2003
- Recorded: Guitars & Keyboards – Queenstreet Recording (December 2002 – January 2003) Drums – Dug-Out Productions (January 2003) Vocals & Bass – Studio Fredman (January – February 2003)
- Genres: Melodic death metal, alternative metal
- Length: 40:52
- Label: Nuclear Blast
- Producer: Soilwork

Soilwork chronology
Natural Born Chaos (2002)	Figure Number Five (2003)	The Early Chapters (2004)

Professional ratings
Review scores
Source	Rating
AllMusic	4/5 stars
Alternative Press	3/5
Rock Hard	9.5/10

Figure Number Five is the fifth studio album by Swedish melodic death metal band Soilwork. The record was released on 22 April 2003 through Nuclear Blast label. On this release, the band introduces more elements of alternative metal into their melodic death metal style. This would be the last album with Henry Ranta on drums before he left the band after its release.

A few different editions of this album existed upon release. The normal release with eleven tracks, as well as a limited edition release with a second CD including their 1997 demo In Dreams We Fall into the Eternal Lake plus two songs from the Steelbath Suicide demo session. The limited vinyl version of the album features two discs - this album and Natural Born Chaos, black and the other a white-colored vinyl. The Japanese version of the album includes one bonus track, entitled "Bursting Out".

== Background ==
This album marked keyboardist Sven Karlsson's first attempts at songwriting for the band. While it is not necessarily interconnected with the keyboardist songwriting, this album features more use of the keyboard and lighter melodies. The album is considered a more commercial sound by most fans of Swedish death metal, but it arguably gives the music a broader appeal. However, vocalist Björn Strid has said the album has good melodies but lacks in intensity and could have been better composed; many fans and critics considered the album "rushed".

Music videos were made for the songs "Rejection Role" and "Light the Torch". The music video for "Rejection Role" showed the band playing in a club and being constantly pestered and booed by the members of In Flames, with interspersed footage of other incidents between the two bands. In Flames's video for "Trigger" showed the situation vice versa, In Flames playing and Soilwork as the bullies. The colour is also reversed in each video: blue for In Flames, red for Soilwork. Both videos also had the other band riding in a pickup truck to and from the club. While some believed the tension between the two bands to be real, in reality the groups are close friends and devised the idea of a dual-video concept as a joke.

This was the last album to feature Henry Ranta on drums.

== Reception ==
In 2005, Figure Number Five was ranked number 398 in Rock Hard magazine's book The 500 Greatest Rock & Metal Albums of All Time.

== Track listing ==
All lyrics are written by Björn "Speed" Strid.

No.	Title	Music	Length
1.	"Rejection Role"	Peter Wichers	3:35
2.	"Overload"	Karlsson	3:44
3.	"Figure Number Five"	Wichers	3:12
4.	"Strangler"	Wichers	3:48
5.	"Light the Torch"	Karlsson	3:41
6.	"Departure Plan"	Karlsson	4:24
7.	"Cranking the Sirens"	Karlsson; Patrik Jerksten	3:26
8.	"Brickwalker"	Karlsson	3:45
9.	"The Mindmaker"	Wichers	3:32
10.	"Distortion Sleep"	Karlsson	3:46
11.	"Downfall 24"	Wichers	3:55

Japanese edition bonus track
No.	Title	Music	Length
12.	"Bursting Out"	Karlsson	3:33

Limited edition bonus CD
No.	Title	Lyrics	Music	Album(s)	Length
1.	"Bound to Illusions"	Wichers	Wichers	In Dreams We Fall into the Eternal Lake demo (1997)	2:49
2.	"My Need"	Wichers	Wichers; Jimmy Persson	In Dreams We Fall into the Eternal Lake demo (1997)	2:55
3.	"In a Close Encounter"	Wichers	Wichers; Persson; Matthias Nilsson	In Dreams We Fall into the Eternal Lake demo (1997)	3:02
4.	"Skin after Skin"	Strid	Wichers; Persson	In Dreams We Fall into the Eternal Lake demo (1997)	3:23
5.	"Wake Up Call" (original version of "Demon in Veins")	Strid; Wichers	Wichers	Steelbath Suicide demo session	3:45
6.	"Steelbath Suicide"	Strid	Strid; Wichers; Ludvig Svartz	Steelbath Suicide demo session	2:56

== Charts ==
Chart (2003)	Peak position	Certification	Sales/ shipments
German Albums Chart	52		

== Personnel ==
=== Band members ===
- Björn "Speed" Strid − Vocals
- Peter Wichers − Guitars
- Ola Frenning − Guitars
- Ola Flink − Bass guitar
- Sven Karlsson − Keyboards
- Henry Ranta − Drums

=== Guest musicians ===
- Jens Broman − Guest vocals on "Figure Number Five"
- Richard Larsson − Tambourine on "Brickwalker"
- Bryan Kaschak – Guitar on "Cranking the Sirens"

== Release history ==
Country	Date
Europe	22 April 2003
Canada	5 May 2003
United States	5 May 2003
