= Stabbing the Drama =

2005 studio album by Soilwork

Studio album by Soilwork
- Released: 8 March 2005
- Recorded: September–October 2004 (Fascination Street Recordings & Dug Out Studios)
- Genre: Melodic death metal, alternative metal, metalcore
- Length: 42:41
- Label: Nuclear Blast
- Producer: Jens Bogren, Daniel Bergstrand

Soilwork chronology
The Early Chapters (2004)	Stabbing the Drama (2005)	Sworn to a Great Divide (2007)

Professional ratings
Review scores
Source	Rating
AllMusic	4/5 stars

Stabbing the Drama is the sixth studio album by Swedish melodic death metal band Soilwork. The record was released on 8 March 2005, via Nuclear Blast label.

For a time this was the last to feature long-time guitarist Peter Wichers, who left the band after the subsequent tour until rejoining in 2008.

Style-wise, this could be considered a more diverse album than the previous record, Figure Number Five, taking elements of the past and present, and potential future. Most of the songwriting is done by guitarist Peter Wichers, and the central musical theme contains a simpler sound than heard on prior albums, with a reduction of harmonic guitar leads and a more metalcore-centric approach, such as usage of stop-start rhythm guitar work and breakdowns. This is also the first album to feature new drummer Dirk Verbeuren, who brings a more technical approach to the band's drumming compared to the previous two albums.

Some pressings of the CD have the times for tracks three and four reversed, with parts of track three still at the start of track four. Various pressings of the CD also mislabeled the final track, "If Possible", to the 12th Bonus Track "Wherever Thorns May Grow" which is only featured on the US and European limited digipak edition, respective the Japanese and Korean pressings. 1,000 copies were made in a limited collectors metal case in the shape of the Soilworker's logo.

Threat Signal did a cover version of the song "Stabbing the Drama" along with Speed, Live.

Some copies of Stabbing the Drama were mastered using HDCD. Although it is unmarked, playing the album in a CD player able to decode HDCD will give superior sound quality.

== Track listing ==
All lyrics are written by Björn "Speed" Strid.

No.	Title	Music	Length
1.	"Stabbing the Drama"	Peter Wichers	4:34
2.	"One with the Flies"	Wichers	4:00
3.	"Weapon of Vanity"	Wichers	4:02
4.	"The Crestfallen"	Sven Karlsson	3:46
5.	"Nerve"	Wichers	3:38
6.	"Stalemate"	Wichers	3:28
7.	"Distance"	Wichers	4:29
8.	"Observation Slave"	Wichers	4:09
9.	"Fate in Motion"	Ola Frenning	3:21
10.	"Blind Eye Halo"	Wichers	2:24
11.	"If Possible"	Karlsson	4:50

Japanese and Korean edition bonus tracks
No.	Title	Music	Length
12.	"Wherever Thorns May Grow" (also in limited digipak edition)	Strid; Wichers	4:08
13.	"Killed by Ignition"	Wichers; Frenning	4:18

== Charts ==
Chart (2005)	Peak position
German Albums Chart	52

== Personnel ==
- Björn Strid − vocals
- Peter Wichers − guitars
- Ola Frenning − guitars
- Ola Flink − bass
- Sven Karlsson − keyboards
- Dirk Verbeuren − drums
