= Natural Born Chaos =

Studio album by Soilwork
- Released: 25 March 2002
- Recorded: October 2001 – February 2002
- Studio: Studio Fredman
- Genre: Melodic death metal, alternative metal
- Length: 41:57
- Label: Nuclear Blast
- Producer: Devin Townsend & Fredrik Nordström (Co-Produced)

Soilwork chronology
A Predator's Portrait (2001)	Natural Born Chaos (2002)	Figure Number Five (2003)

Professional ratings
Review scores
Source	Rating
AllMusic	3/5 stars

Natural Born Chaos is the fourth studio album by Swedish melodic death metal band Soilwork. According to Nielsen Soundscan, the album sold 2267 copies in the US as of 2002.

The album comes in a limited vinyl version and features two lps with this album and Figure Number Five in white and the other black. The album was voted the number one album by BW and BK magazine in 2002. A video was also made for "As We Speak".

This is the first album with current keyboardist Sven Karlsson.

This is also the first release from the band to include elements such as alternative metal, a style that would become more evident in the band's following release, Figure Number Five.

== Track listing ==
All lyrics are written by Björn "Speed" Strid, except "Soilworker's Song of the Damned" written by Strid and Jens Broman

No.	Title	Music	Length
1.	"Follow the Hollow"	Peter Wichers	4:02
2.	"As We Speak"	Wichers	3:43
3.	"The Flameout"	Wichers; Ola Frenning; Henry Ranta	4:18
4.	"Natural Born Chaos"	Wichers	4:08
5.	"Mindfields"	Frenning	3:29
6.	"The Bringer"	Wichers	4:43
7.	"Black Star Deceiver"	Wichers	4:42
8.	"Mercury Shadow"	Wichers	3:49
9.	"No More Angels"	Frenning	4:01
10.	"Soilworker's Song of the Damned"	Wichers; Karlsson	5:02

Japanese edition bonus track
No.	Title	Music	Length
11.	"Kvicksilver" (Swedish version of "Mercury Shadow")	Wichers	3:48

== Personnel ==
=== Soilwork ===
- Björn "Speed" Strid − vocals
- Peter Wichers − guitar
- Ola Frenning − guitar
- Ola Flink − bass
- Sven Karlsson − keyboards
- Henry Ranta − drums

=== Guests ===
- Mattias Eklundh − guitar solo on "No More Angels"
- Devin Townsend − co-vocals on "Black Star Deceiver" and "Soilworker's Song of the Damned"
