= The Chainheart Machine =

Studio album by Soilwork
- Released: 25 September 1999
- Recorded: February 1999
- Studio: Studio Fredman
- Genre: Melodic death metal
- Length: 43:34
- Label: Listenable; Century Media
- Producer: Fredrik Nordström & Soilwork

Soilwork chronology
Steelbath Suicide (1998)	The Chainheart Machine (1999)	A Predator's Portrait (2001)

Professional ratings
Review scores
Source	Rating
AllMusic	4.5/5 stars

The Chainheart Machine is the second studio album by Swedish melodic death metal band Soilwork. It is the first Soilwork release to feature guitarist Ola Frenning and drummer Henry Ranta.

There is an instrumental hidden track on "Room No 99" as the song ends at 5:00 followed by silence until the 7:00 minute mark where the hidden track begins. The hidden track transitions perfectly into the opening title track.

== Track listing ==
No.	Title	Lyrics	Music	Length
1.	"The Chainheart Machine"	Björn "Speed" Strid; Peter Wichers	Strid; Wichers; Ola Frenning	4:01
2.	"Bulletbeast"	Strid; Wichers	Wichers; Frenning	4:37
3.	"Millionflame"	Strid	Wichers; Frenning; Carlos Del Olmo Holmberg	4:20
4.	"Generation Speedkill (Nice Day for a Public Suicide)"	Strid; Jens Broman	Strid; Frenning	4:27
5.	"Neon Rebels"	Strid	Frenning	3:23
6.	"Possessing the Angels"	Strid	Strid; Wichers; Frenning	3:55
7.	"Spirits of the Future Sun"	Strid	Wichers; Frenning	6:00
8.	"Machinegun Majesty"	Strid	Strid; Wichers; Frenning	5:05
9.	"Room No 99"	Strid	Wichers; Frenning	7:40

1999 Japanese edition bonus track
No.	Title	Lyrics	Music	Length
10.	"Shadowchild"	Strid; Wichers; Broman; Ranta	Strid; Wichers; Del Olmo Holmberg	4:50

2000 Japanese edition bonus tracks
No.	Title	Lyrics	Music	Length
10.	"Shadowchild"	Strid; Wichers; Broman; Ranta	Strid; Wichers; Del Olmo Holmberg	4:50
11.	"Egypt" (Mercyful Fate cover)	King Diamond	Diamond	5:22
12.	"Sadistic Lullabye" (live at Tilburg '99)			3:17

2009 re-issue bonus tracks
No.	Title	Length
10.	"Machinegun Majesty" (live at Tilburg '99)	5:23
11.	"Neon Rebels" (live at Tilburg '99)	4:05

2010 Japanese re-issue bonus tracks
No.	Title	Lyrics	Music	Length
10.	"Machinegun Majesty" (live at Tilburg '99)			5:23
11.	"Neon Rebels" (live at Tilburg '99)			4:05
12.	"Shadowchild"	Strid; Wichers; Broman; Ranta	Strid; Wichers; Del Olmo Holmberg	4:50
13.	"Egypt" (Mercyful Fate cover)	Diamond	Diamond	5:22

== Credits ==
=== Soilwork ===
- Bjorn "Speed" Strid − vocals
- Peter Wichers − guitar
- Ola Frenning − guitar
- Ola Flink − bass
- Carlos Del Olmo Holmberg − keyboards
- Henry Ranta − drums

=== Guests ===
- Mattias Eklundh − guitar solo on "Machinegun Majesty"
- Mattias Nilsson – 2009 remastering

== Release history ==
Date	Version
24 May 2000	Japan CD
2008	Re-issue
