= Peter Wichers =

Swedish guitarist and producer

- Also known as: Vicious
- Born: 8 February 1979 (age 47); Ängelholm, Sweden
- Origin: Helsingborg, Sweden
- Genres: Melodic death metal
- Occupations: Musician, songwriter, record producer
- Instrument: Guitar
- Labels: Listenable, Century Media, Nuclear Blast
- Formerly of: Soilwork
- Website: soilwork.org

Peter Wichers (born 8 February 1979) is a Swedish guitarist, songwriter and record producer best known as one of the founding members of melodic death metal band Soilwork. From 1995 until late 2005, when he announced his departure from the band, and again from 2008 until 2012 he was the lead guitarist and songwriter, especially on their Stabbing the Drama album.

== Rejoining ==
18 September 2008, it was announced that Wichers had rejoined Soilwork in his previous role. Having joined the band again, Wichers accompanied Soilwork on their European tour in late 2008 and the American tour in early 2009. Once the tour was finished, the band wrote and recorded The Panic Broadcast album. On 25 June 2012 it was announced that Wichers left the band for the second time, due to creative differences. Peter's official statement posted on the band's Facebook page is as follows:

I want to thank everyone who has supported Soilwork over the years. It has been a wild and fun ride, but it's time for me to explore different options in my career. I will cherish all the amazing moments I have gathered from my time with Soilwork, and I would not be where I am today without the help from you Fans, my family and Soilwork. Thank you!

— Peter Wichers

After leaving Soilwork, he filled in for Adam Dutkiewicz when he was injured on Killswitch Engage's European tour. Later he collaborated with singers from across the melodic death metal genre including Anders Fridén, former bandmate Björn "Speed" Strid and John Bush (Armored Saint and ex Anthrax vocalist) to make an album much in the same style as Roadrunner United, entitled Nuclear Blast All-Stars. He also co-wrote Warrel Dane's solo record Praises to the War Machine.

== Personal life ==
After his first split from Soilwork, Wichers moved from Los Angeles to Nashville, Tennessee where he worked as a producer and songwriter. Wichers currently lives in North Carolina with his wife, Sara Wichers (who is from North Carolina) with the couple's son. Wichers met Sara in Spain while touring for Soilwork. Wichers works for Jackson Guitars since 2015.

== Discography ==
Soilwork

- In Dreams We Fall into the Eternal Lake (1997 demo)
- Steelbath Suicide (1998)
- The Chainheart Machine (2000)
- A Predator's Portrait (2001)
- Natural Born Chaos (2002)
- Figure Number Five (2003)
- The Early Chapters (2003 EP)
- Stabbing the Drama (2005)
- The Panic Broadcast (2010)

Warrel Dane

- Praises to the War Machine (2008)

Contributions

- Nuclear Blast All-Stars: Out of the Dark (2007)

== Producer ==
- All That Remains - The Fall of Ideals (2006) (guitar production/engineer)
- Nuclear Blast All-Stars: Out of the Dark (2006) (guitar, bass, producer/engineer)
- Samadhi - Incandescence (2007)
- Warrel Dane - Praises to the War Machine (2008) (guitar, bass, producer/engineer)
- Mannah - Untitled (2008) (producer/engineer)
- Nevermore - The Obsidian Conspiracy (2010) (producer/engineer)
- Remain - Untitled (2010) (producer/engineer, mix)
- Soilwork - The Panic Broadcast (2010) (producer/engineer)
- Darkest Hour - The Human Romance (2011)
- James LaBrie - Impermanent Resonance (2013) (Co-Producer / Additional songwriting - guitars)
