= Steelbath Suicide =

Studio album by Soilwork
- Released: 20 May 1998
- Recorded: 1997
- Studio: Studio Fredman, Sweden
- Genre: Melodic death metal
- Length: 36:08
- Label: Listenable; Century Media (2000)
- Producer: Fredrik Nordström, Soilwork

Soilwork chronology
| Steelbath Suicide (1998) | The Chainheart Machine (1999) |

Alternative cover
- Century Media's alternate release cover (2000)

Professional ratings
Review scores
| Source | Rating |
|---|---|
| AllMusic | 4/5 stars |

Steelbath Suicide is the debut studio album by Swedish melodic death metal band Soilwork. It was released on 20 May 1998 through Listenable and Century Media labels. It is the only album to feature guitarist Ludvig Svartz and drummer Jimmy Persson.

The original release has two Japanese bonus tracks, "Disintegrated Skies" and "Burn", a Deep Purple cover. Century Media re-released the album in 2000 with different cover art and a live track of "Sadistic Lullabye".

This album is a firm example of the band's immediate roots in Swedish melodic death metal. The song "Demon in Veins", is a revised version of "Wake Up Call" off their demo; the lyrics changed are in the chorus.

== Track listing ==
| No. | Title | Lyrics | Music | Length |
|---|---|---|---|---|
| 1. | "Entering the Angel Diabolique" (instrumental) | | Peter Wichers; Ludvig Svartz | 2:25 |
| 2. | "Sadistic Lullabye" | Björn "Speed" Strid | Wichers; Strid; Svartz | 2:55 |
| 3. | "My Need" | Wichers | Wichers; Strid; Jimmy Persson | 3:42 |
| 4. | "Skin After Skin" | Strid | Wichers; Strid; Persson | 3:27 |
| 5. | "Wings of Domain" | Strid | Wichers | 3:19 |
| 6. | "Steelbath Suicide" | Strid | Wichers; Strid; Svartz | 2:54 |
| 7. | "In a Close Encounter" | Wichers | Wichers | 2:52 |
| 8. | "Centro de predominio" (instrumental) | | Wichers | 2:06 |
| 9. | "Razorlives" | Strid | Wichers | 4:24 |
| 10. | "Demon in Veins" | Wichers; Strid | Wichers | 3:43 |
| 11. | "The Aardvark Trail" | Strid | Wichers; Strid; Svartz | 4:17 |

2000 re-issue bonus track
| No. | Title | Length |
|---|---|---|
| 12. | "Sadistic Lullabye" (live at Tilburg 99) | 2:49 |

Japanese edition bonus tracks
| No. | Title | Lyrics | Music | Length |
|---|---|---|---|---|
| 12. | "Disintegrated Skies" | Strid | Wichers | 3:59 |
| 13. | "Burn" (Deep Purple cover) | David Coverdale | Coverdale; Ritchie Blackmore; Jon Lord; Ian Paice | 5:44 |

2008 re-issue bonus tracks
| No. | Title | Length |
|---|---|---|
| 12. | "Sadistic Lullabye" (live at Tilburg 99) | 3:16 |
| 13. | "The Aardvark Trail" (live at Tilburg 99) | 4:56 |

== Credits ==
- Björn "Speed" Strid – vocals
- Peter Wichers – guitar
- Ludvig Svartz – guitar
- Carlos Del Olmo Holmberg – keyboards, synthesizer, programming
- Ola Flink – bass
- Jimmy Persson – drums

== Release history ==
| Region | Date | Version |
|---|---|---|
| Europe | 20 May 1998 | Original |
| Europe | 2000 | Re-issue |
| Europe | 2008 | Re-issue |
