= Dirk Verbeuren =

Belgian drummer

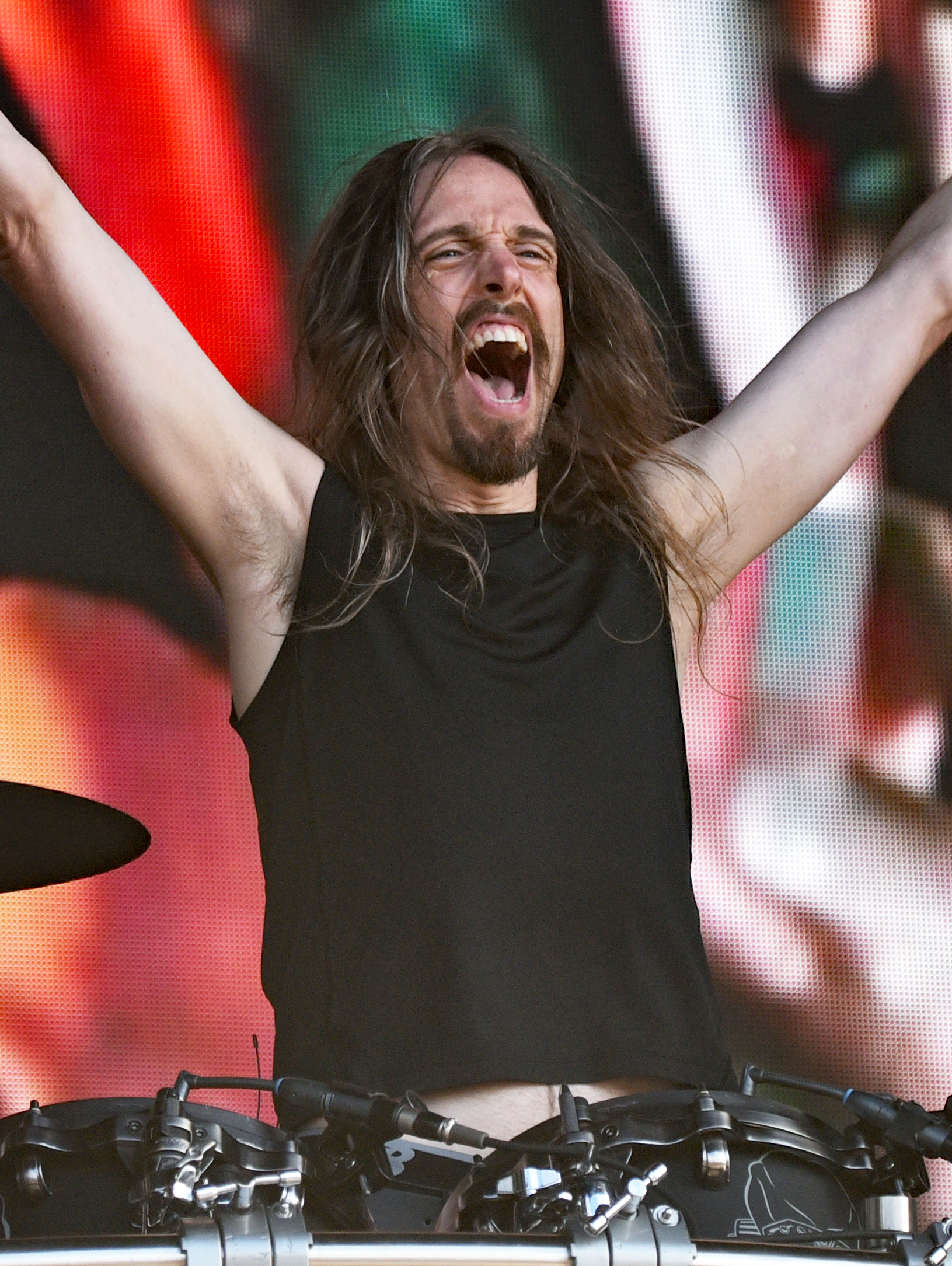
- Verbeuren in 2023

Background information
- Born: 8 January 1975 (age 51); Antwerp, Belgium
- Genres: Heavy metal, extreme metal
- Occupation: Musician
- Instruments: Drums
- Years active: 1990–present
- Member of: Megadeth, Scarve, Bent Sea, Powermad, Brave the Cold, The Project Hate MCMXCIX, Cadaver, Cobra the Impaler, Pulse of Nebulae, Geoda, Freya, Abyssal Vortex, Blood from the Soul, Kill Division
- Formerly of: Soilwork, Aborted, Phazm, Anatomy of I, One-Way Mirror
- Website: dirkverbeuren.com

Dirk Verbeuren (born 8 January 1975) is a Belgian drummer, best known as the current drummer of American thrash metal band Megadeth, and formerly the drummer for the Swedish melodic death metal band Soilwork.

== Early life ==
Verbeuren was born in Wilrijk, a district of Antwerp. He cites Dave Lombardo and Mick Harris as earliest influences on his drumming. Other influences include Gavin Harrison, Sean Reinert, Gene Hoglan, Tomas Haake, Steve Flynn, Pete Sandoval, Morgan Ågren, Tony Laureano and Chad Smith. As well as being a metal musician and listener, Verbeuren is also a fan of hip hop music. In an interview, he mentioned The Beastie Boys, Run-DMC, and Public Enemy as his favourite hip hop groups in his teen years.

== Career ==
Verbeuren has been either a session drummer or full-time member for many bands such as Satyricon, Sybreed, Hassan Iqbal, and Articulus. He joined Soilwork in 2004 and recorded Stabbing the Drama (2005), Sworn to a Great Divide (2007), The Panic Broadcast (2010), The Living Infinite (2013), and The Ride Majestic (2015) with the band. In 2016, Verbeuren left Soilwork to join Megadeth as a full-time member. With Megadeth, Verbeuren recorded The Sick, the Dying... and the Dead! (2022), and Megadeth (2026).

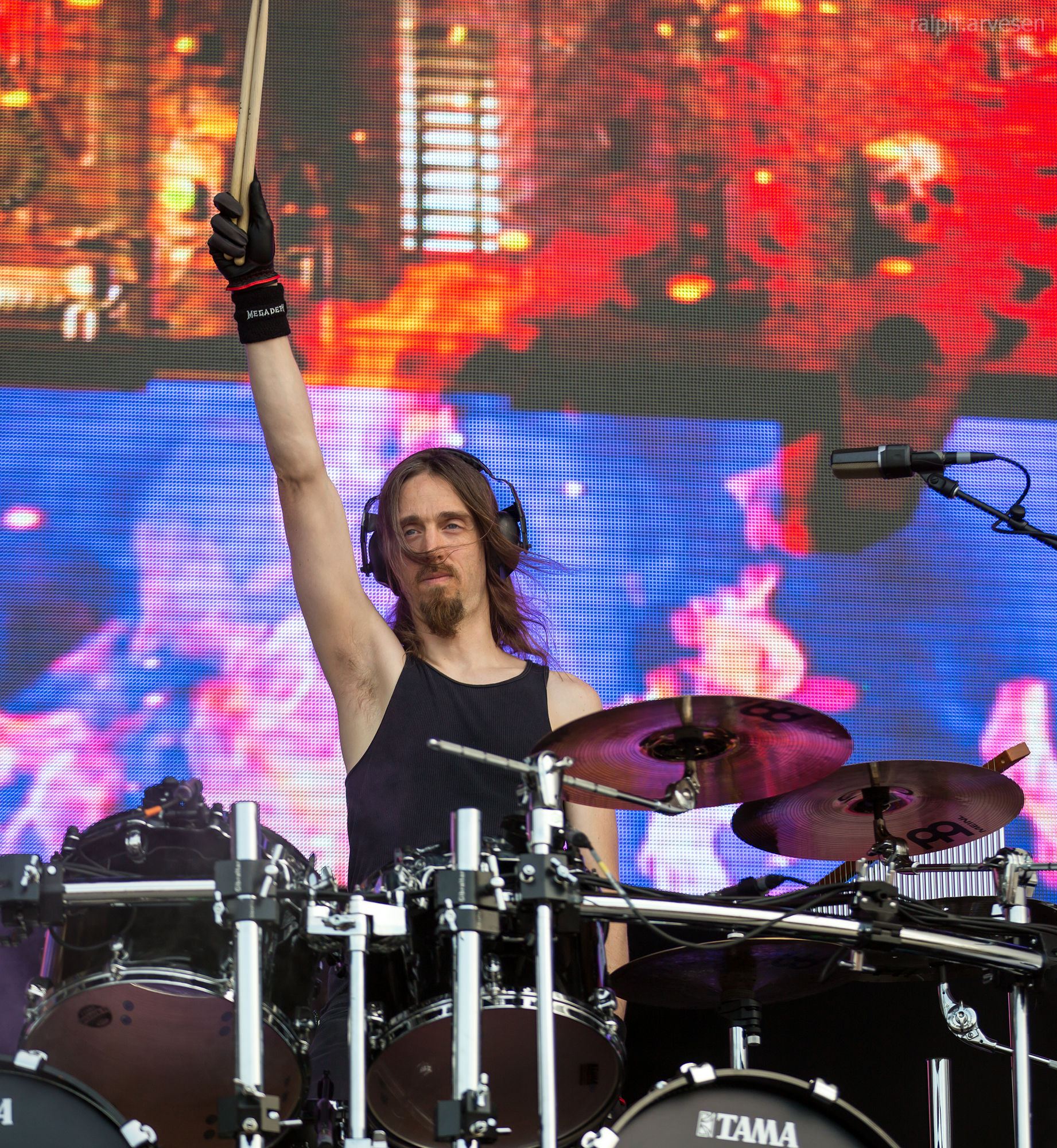
Verbeuren performing with Megadeth in 2016

Verbeuren is endorsed by Tama Drums and sticks, Meinl cymbals, Evans Drumheads, Toontrack software, dB drumshoes and Alien Ears in-ear monitors. He recorded four elaborate MIDI drum packs for Toontrack: Library of the Extreme: Blasts and Fills, Death & Thrash, Fill Insanity and Metal Beats and contributed MIDI tracks to The Metal Foundry SDX and Metal! EZX.

== Personal life ==
Verbeuren is vegan.
