= The Ride Majestic =

Studio album by Soilwork
- Released: 28 August 2015
- Recorded: February–June 2015
- Genre: Melodic death metal
- Length: 49:52
- Label: Nuclear Blast
- Producer: David Castillo, Soilwork

Soilwork chronology
Live in the Heart of Helsinki (2015)	The Ride Majestic (2015)	Death Resonance (2016)

Professional ratings
Review scores
Source	Rating
About.com	3.5/5 stars
Blabbermouth.net	9/10
Exclaim!	7/10
Metalsucks	4.5/5 stars
New Noise	5/5 stars
Revolver	4/5

The Ride Majestic is the tenth studio album by Swedish melodic death metal band Soilwork. It was released on 28 August 2015 and is the first album to not feature longtime bassist Ola Flink who left before the recording of the album and also the last album to feature longtime drummer Dirk Verbeuren, who left the band in July 2016 to join Megadeth.

== Background ==
On 5 December 2014, Soilwork frontman Björn Strid confirmed that work had begun on a new album when he posted a picture on Facebook of him listening to new demos. Strid also stated that Soilwork are sounding "better than ever". It was also confirmed that Soilwork has teamed up with Chuck Billy's Breaking Bands LLC management company for the album.

On 8 July, the band released the title track as the album's first single. On 13 August, the album teaser was released. On 20 August, the band released "Enemies in Fidelity" as a promotional single.

== Track listing ==
No.	Title	Lyrics	Music	Length
1.	"The Ride Majestic"	Björn Strid	Strid	4:09
2.	"Alight in the Aftermath"	David Andersson	Sylvain Coudret	3:47
3.	"Death in General"	Strid	Strid; Andersson	4:59
4.	"Enemies in Fidelity"	Strid	Strid	4:16
5.	"Petrichor by Sulphur"	Andersson	Andersson	5:11
6.	"The Phantom"	Strid	Andersson	3:57
7.	"The Ride Majestic (Aspire Angelic)"	Strid; Andersson	Andersson	4:46
8.	"Whirl of Pain"	Strid; Andersson	Andersson	5:01
9.	"All Along Echoing Paths"	Strid	Strid	4:21
10.	"Shining Lights"	Strid	Coudret	3:43
11.	"Father and Son, Watching the World Go Down"	Strid	Andersson	5:40
Total length:				49:52

Limited digipak and Japanese edition bonus tracks
No.	Title	Lyrics	Music	Length
12.	"Of Hollow Dreams"	Miguel Holmberg	Strid	4:08
Total length:				54:00

Limited digipak bonus track
No.	Title	Lyrics	Music	Length
13.	"Ghosts and Thunder"	Strid	Strid	5:17
Total length:				59:17

Japanese edition bonus track
No.	Title	Lyrics	Music	Length
13.	"The End Begins Below the Surface"	Dirk Verbeuren	Verbeuren	3:17
Total length:				57:17

== Credits ==
Writing, performance and production credits are adapted from the album's liner notes.

=== Personnel ===
==== Soilwork ====
- Björn Strid – vocals
- Sylvain Coudret – guitars, bass
- David Andersson – guitars, bass
- Sven Karlsson – keyboards
- Dirk Verbeuren – drums
- Markus Wibom – bass (credited, but did not perform)

==== Guest musicians ====
- Pascal Poulsen (Odium) – vocals on "The Phantom"
- Nathan James Biggs (Sonic Syndicate) – vocals on "Father and Son, Watching the World Go Down"

==== Additional musicians ====
- Hanna Carlsson – cello on "The Ride Majestic", "Enemies in Fidelity" and "The Phantom"; piano on "The Ride Majestic"

==== Production ====
- David Castillo – production, recording, mixing (tracks 12–13)
- Soilwork – production
- Björn Strid – vocal production and recording
- Linus Corneliusson – additional recording, mix assistance, additional editing
- Rickard Gustafsson – drum tech
- Per Burström – drum tech
- Jens Bogren – mixing (tracks 1–11), mastering
- Tony Lindgren – mastering assistance

==== Artwork and design ====
- Róbert Borbás (theartofgrindesign.com) – cover art
- Hannah Verbeuren (hannahvphotography.com) – photography
- Mircea Gabriel Eftemie (eftemie.com) – layout, additional art
- Carlos Holmberg – Soilwork logo
- Tobias Green – Soilwork emblem a.k.a. The Sledgehammer Massiah

=== Studios ===
- Fascination Street Studios 1, Stockholm, Sweden – recording
- Black-out in the Red Room, Landskrona, Sweden – vocals recording
- Fascination Street Studios 2, Örebro, Sweden – mixing, mastering

== Charts ==
Chart	Peak position
Australian Albums (ARIA)	60
Austrian Albums (Ö3 Austria)	37
Belgian Albums (Ultratop Flanders)	91
Belgian Albums (Ultratop Wallonia)	112
Finnish Albums (Suomen virallinen lista)	12
French Albums (SNEP)	107
German Albums (Offizielle Top 100)	30
Swedish Albums (Sverigetopplistan)	22
Swiss Albums (Schweizer Hitparade)	49
UK Independent Albums (OCC)	26
UK Rock & Metal Albums (OCC)	20
US Billboard 200	103
US Independent Albums (Billboard)	8
US Top Hard Rock Albums (Billboard)	6
US Top Rock Albums (Billboard)	16
