= The Panic Broadcast =

Studio album by Soilwork
- Released: 2 July 2010
- Recorded: January–March 2010 in Mooresville & Asheville
- Genre: Melodic death metal, metalcore
- Length: 47:46
- Label: Nuclear Blast
- Producer: Peter Wichers

Soilwork chronology
Sworn to a Great Divide (2007)	The Panic Broadcast (2010)	The Sledgehammer Files: The Best of Soilwork 1998-2008 (2010)

The Panic Broadcast is the eighth studio album by Swedish melodic death metal band Soilwork, released 2 July in Europe and 13 July in North America, 2010. The album marks the return of long-time Soilwork guitarist and founder Peter Wichers, who also took on the role as the album's producer, though Wichers would leave Soilwork in 2012. The album also features the debut of guitarist Sylvain Coudret who replaced longtime guitarist Ola Frenning in 2008. Mixing was done by Jens Bogren. According to Nielsen SoundScan, The Panic Broadcast sold around 5,257 copies in its first week of sales in the United States. The album debuted at #88 on the Billboard 200 chart, making it their highest-charting album in their entire career at the time.

== Album ==
Musically, this album found the band moving back more to their speed-laden, melodic death metal roots, though the already present alternative and metalcore sound still remains. In an interview with SuicideGirls.com, Wichers spoke about what direction the band might take musically with its next album. "We talked about maybe taking a little bit of a different approach for the next record," he said. "Having me and Sylvain back in the band, I think that we're probably going to try to do stuff that might be a little more technical. We want to keep the element of the catchy chorus but at the same time maybe have bit more guitar solos than on Sworn to a Great Divide and also let Dirk [Verbeuren, drums] get more space on the record for drumming. That was one of the things I think that 'Sworn to a Great Divide' was lacking a little bit. It's a good record but I think that with such talented musicians the next album definitely needs to have more performance." Peter Wichers also stated that this album will have more blues elements that previous albums and even said that one of the riffs for 'The Thrill' was inspired by a bluegrass riff.

Lead vocalist Björn Strid confirmed 18 February 2010 that the drums for the album had already been recorded. He also confirmed the names of six tracks: "The Thrill", "Late for the Kill, Early for the Slaughter", "The Akuma Afterglow", "Let This River Flow", "Where Angels Fear to Tread" and "Two Lives Worth of Reckoning". The complete track listing was revealed on 8 April.

On 17 May 2010, the band released "Two Lives Worth of Reckoning" on their MySpace.

== Track listing ==
All lyrics are written by Björn "Speed" Strid.

The Panic Broadcast
No.	Title	Music	Length
1.	"Late for the Kill, Early for the Slaughter"	Peter Wichers	4:09
2.	"Two Lives Worth of Reckoning"	Wichers	4:56
3.	"The Thrill"	Wichers	4:33
4.	"Deliverance Is Mine"	Wichers; Sylvain Coudret; Dirk Verbeuren	3:50
5.	"Night Comes Clean"	Wichers	5:12
6.	"King of the Threshold"	Wichers; Coudret	4:57
7.	"Let This River Flow"	Wichers	5:20
8.	"Epitome"	Wichers; Coudret	4:44
9.	"The Akuma Afterglow"	Wichers	4:29
10.	"Enter Dog of Pavlov"	Wichers; Coudret	5:36

Limited Digipak edition bonus track
No.	Title	Music	Length
11.	"Sweet Demise"	Wichers; Verbeuren	4:09

Limited Box edition bonus tracks
No.	Title	Music	Length
11.	"Sweet Demise"	Wichers; Verbeuren	4:09
12.	"Distance (Drop's Electrip Enhancement)"	Wichers	5:16

Japanese edition bonus track
No.	Title	Music	Length
11.	"Sadistic Lullaby" (re-recorded version)	Strid; Wichers; Svartz	2:58

Japanese limited edition bonus tracks
No.	Title	Music	Length
11.	"Sadistic Lullaby" (re-recorded version)	Strid; Wichers; Svartz	2:58
12.	"The Crestfallen (Drop's Syber Revision)"	Karlsson	4:38

Limited edition bonus DVD
No.	Title	Length
1.	"Studio Footage - The Making of The Panic Broadcast"	19:11
2.	"Late for the Kill, Early for the Slaughter" (drums clip)	3:56

== Personnel ==
Soilwork

- Björn "Speed" Strid – vocals
- Peter Wichers – guitars
- Ola Flink – bass
- Sven Karlsson – keyboards
- Dirk Verbeuren – drums
- Sylvain Coudret – guitars

Technical personnel

- Peter Wichers – production, engineering
- Jens Bogren – mixing

== Reception ==
Professional ratings
Review scores
Source	Rating
Allmusic	4/5 stars
Rock Sound	8/10 stars

The NewReview gave the album a 4.0 out of 5 and stated "Soilwork is the kind of band so ahead of the curve they have the keys to the asphalt paving machine. The Panic Broadcast is another in a long line of Soilwork albums crammed full of metal goodness and makes you sorry you fell for cheap, trendy trash."

=== Charts ===
Chart (2010)	Peak position	Certification	Sales/ shipments
Finnish Albums Chart	14		
German Albums Chart	24		
Swedish Albums Chart	29		
Japanese Albums Chart	42		
Greek Albums Chart	44		
Austrian Albums Chart	47		
Swiss Albums Chart	60		
Billboard 200	88		5,257
French Albums Chart	141		
