= Björn Strid =

Swedish singer

Björn "Speed" Strid
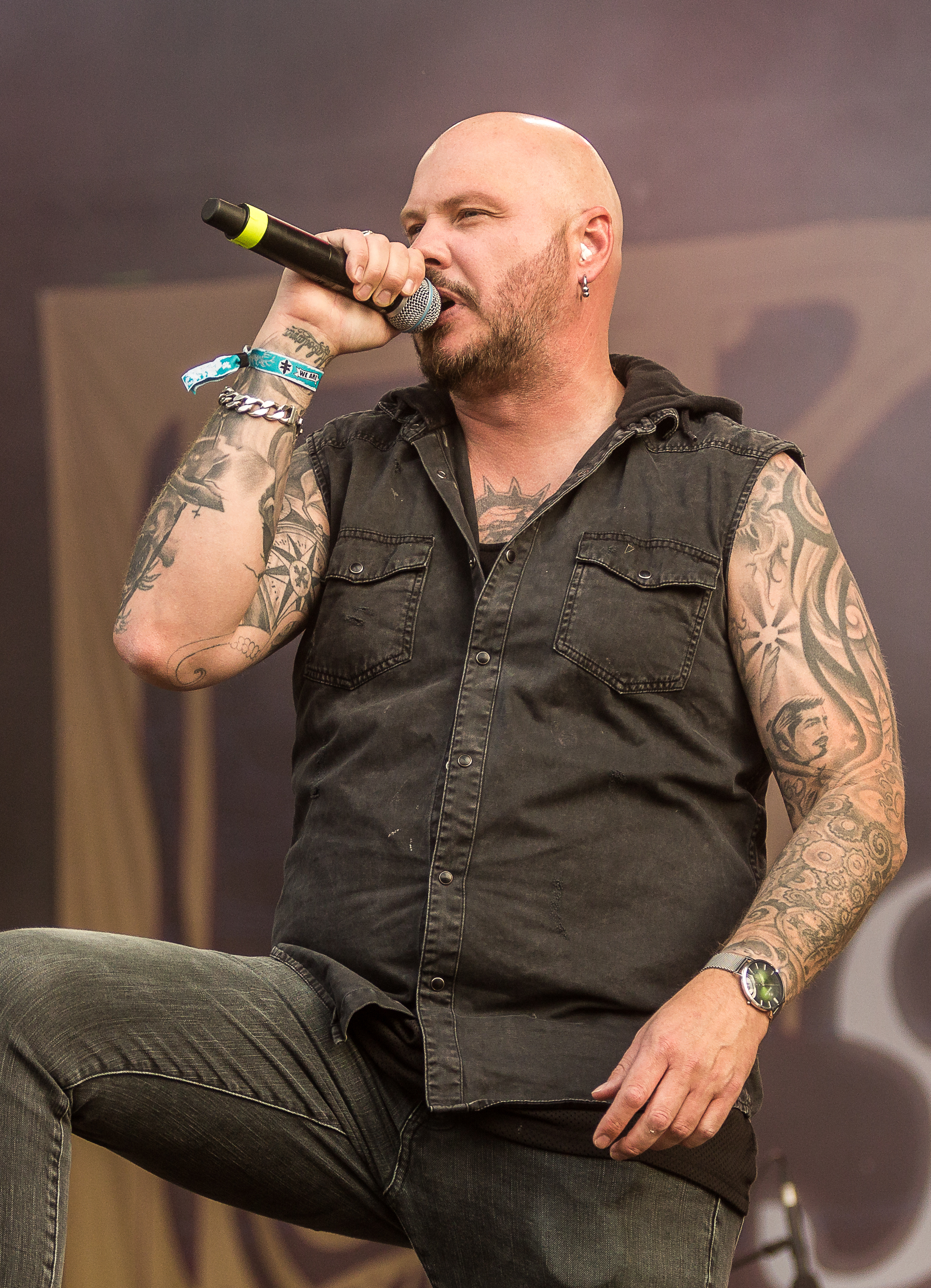
- Strid with Soilwork in 2019

Background information
- Born: Björn Ove Ingemar Strid; 10 September 1978 (age 47); Glumslöv, Sweden
- Genres: Melodic death metal; alternative metal; rock
- Occupations: Singer; songwriter
- Years active: 1995–present
- Member of: Soilwork; The Night Flight Orchestra; Terror 2000; Act of Denial; Nemesis Alpha
- Formerly of: Darkane; Coldseed

Björn Ove Ingemar "Speed" Strid (born 10 September 1978) is a Swedish singer best known as the frontman of the melodic death metal band Soilwork and the classic rock band The Night Flight Orchestra. He has also performed with Disarmonia Mundi, Terror 2000, Coldseed, and Act of Denial, among others.

In 2023, Jake Richardson of Loudwire included him in his list of the "10 Best Clean Singers in Metalcore".

== Early life ==
Strid was born in Helsingborg. He gained the nickname "Speed" from fellow students as a result of the "extreme music" he was known to enjoy.

== Career ==
Strid co-founded the melodic death metal band Soilwork in 1995 under the name Inferior Breed which was later changed to Soilwork once the fledgling band's sound began to take shape. He is the only original member still in the band. Most of Soilwork's lyrics are written by Strid himself.

Strid has also provided vocals for Darkane on their demo recording prior to Lawrence Mackrory joining the band before their debut album. He made a guest appearance on the Destruction track "The Alliance of Hellhoundz" alongside numerous other prominent metal singers, as well as appearing on Zero Tolerance's "Prime Time Mind Surgery", Phoenix-based metal band Howitzer's "245", and Danish band Mercenary's "Redefine Me" from their album The Hours That Remain. He has also recently provided guest vocals for the Seattle-based band Demon Hunter on the track "Collapsing" from their album The World Is a Thorn which was released in March 2010, and also performed on power metal band Kamelot's Poetry for the Poisoned on the track "The Great Pandemonium". He also performed guest vocals on the track "Puppets 2: The Rain" by American metalcore band Motionless in White. In February 2013, Strid began a collaboration with the Russian metal band The Polygon that released the debut EP Stained Anger in 2014. He also performed the choruses on The Moor's single "The Castaway" which was released in July 2014. He also provided vocals on Earthside's song "Crater" from their debut album A Dream in Static. Strid is also featured on Silent Descent's track "Vortex" from their 2017 album Turn to Grey.

== Vocal style and influences ==
Strid utilizes a varied vocal style, being able to quickly alternate between more guttural growls and higher screams and clean, harmonious vocals, and has gone on record as saying that Killing Machine (known as Hell Bent for Leather in the US) by Judas Priest is his favorite album, but more recently has cited Iron Maiden's The Number of the Beast as his favourite.

== Discography ==
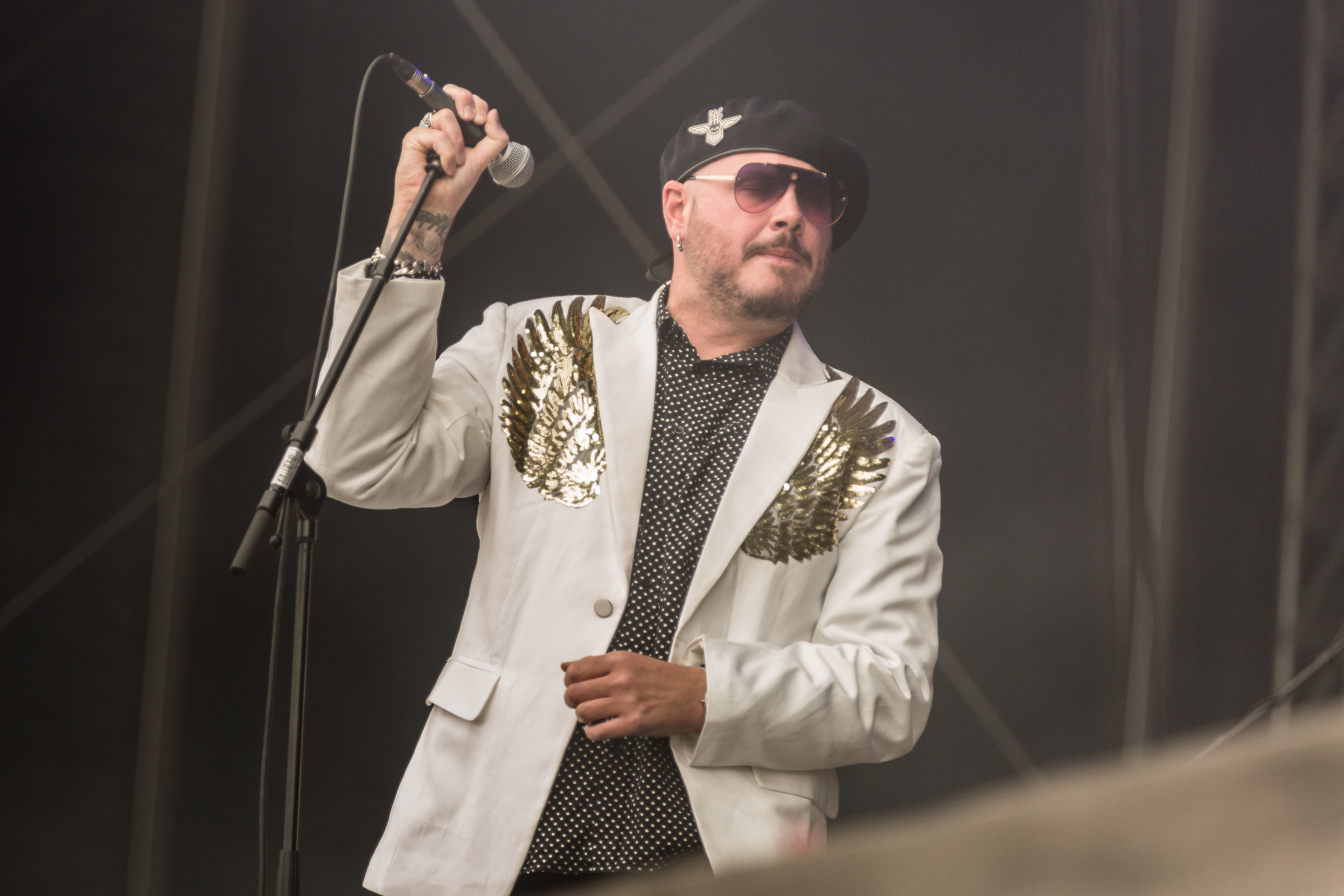
Strid with The Night Flight Orchestra at Rockharz Open Air 2019 in Germany

=== Soilwork ===
- Steelbath Suicide (1998)
- The Chainheart Machine (2000)
- A Predator's Portrait (2001)
- Natural Born Chaos (2002)
- Figure Number Five (2003)
- Stabbing the Drama (2005)
- Sworn to a Great Divide (2007)
- The Panic Broadcast (2010)
- The Living Infinite (2013)
- The Ride Majestic (2015)
- Death Resonance (2016)
- Verkligheten (2019)
- Övergivenheten (2022)

=== Terror 2000 ===
- Slaughterhouse Supremacy (2000)
- Faster Disaster (2002)
- Terror for Sale (2005)

=== Disarmonia Mundi ===
- Fragments of D-Generation (2004) (guest musician)
- Mind Tricks (2006) (guest musician)
- The Isolation Game (2009) (guest musician)
- Cold Inferno (2015) (guest musician)
- The Dormant Stranger (2025) (guest musician)

=== Coldseed ===
- Completion Makes the Tragedy (2006)

=== The Night Flight Orchestra ===
- Internal Affairs (2012)
- Skyline Whispers (2015)
- Amber Galactic (2017)
- Sometimes the World Ain't Enough (2018)
- Aeromantic (2020)
- Aeromantic II (2021)
- Give Us the Moon (2025)

=== Nemesis Alpha ===
- Eternal Machines (2019)

=== Act of Denial ===
- Negative (2021)

=== Tarja ===
- Dead Promises (2019)
