= Soilwork =

Swedish melodic death metal band

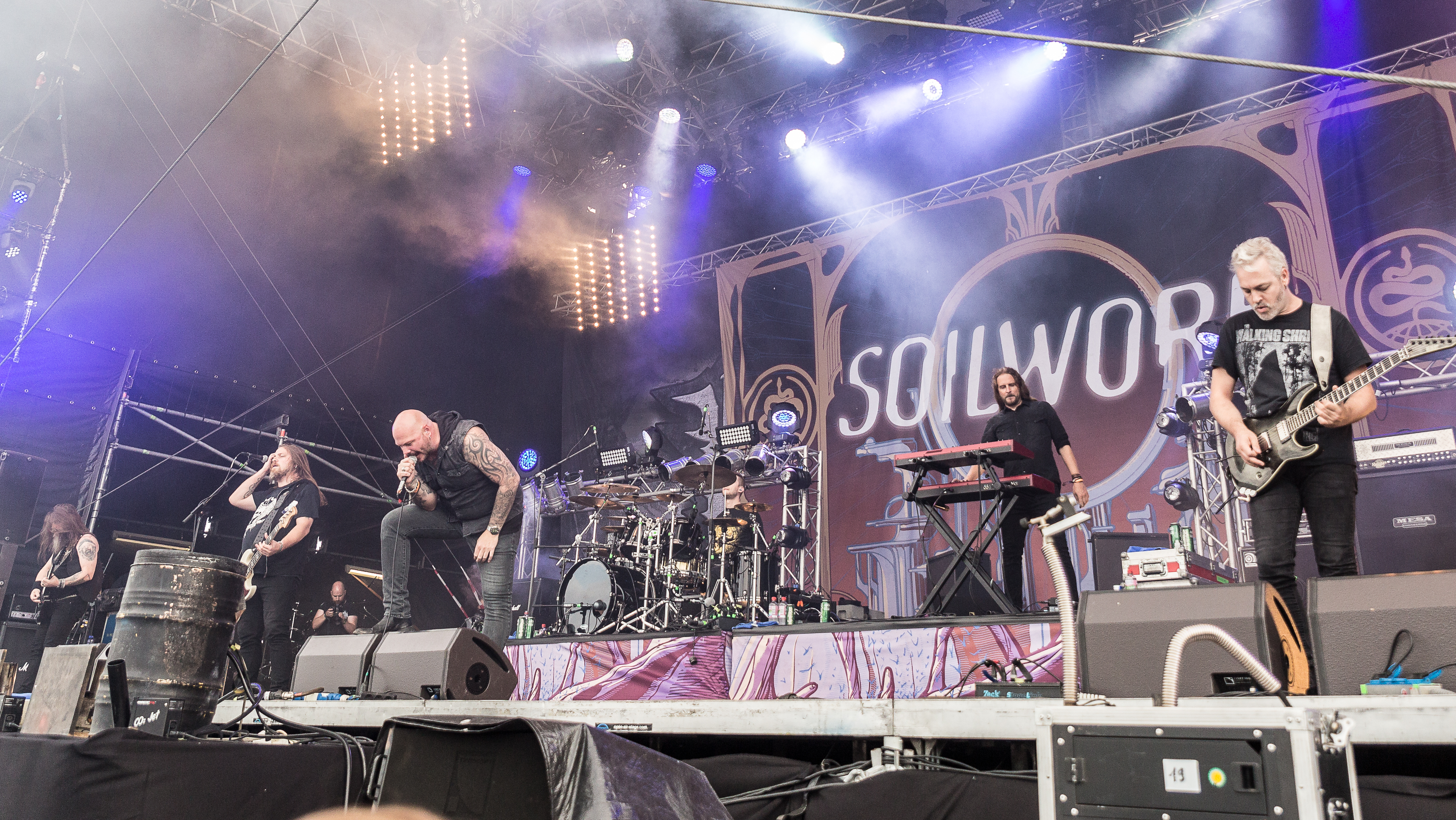
- Soilwork performing in 2019

Background information
- Also known as: Inferior Breed (1995–1996)
- Origin: Helsingborg, Sweden
- Genres: Melodic death metal; alternative metal
- Years active: 1995–present
- Labels: Listenable, Century Media, Nuclear Blast
- Members: Björn Strid; Sven Karlsson; Sylvain Coudret; Bastian Thusgaard; Rasmus Ehrnborn; Simon Johansson
- Past members: List of Soilwork band members
- Website: www.soilwork.org

Soilwork is a Swedish melodic death metal band from Helsingborg. They have released twelve studio albums. It was formed in late 1995 by Björn Strid and Peter Wichers as Inferior Breed. In late 1996, they changed their name to Soilwork, which means "working from the ground up".

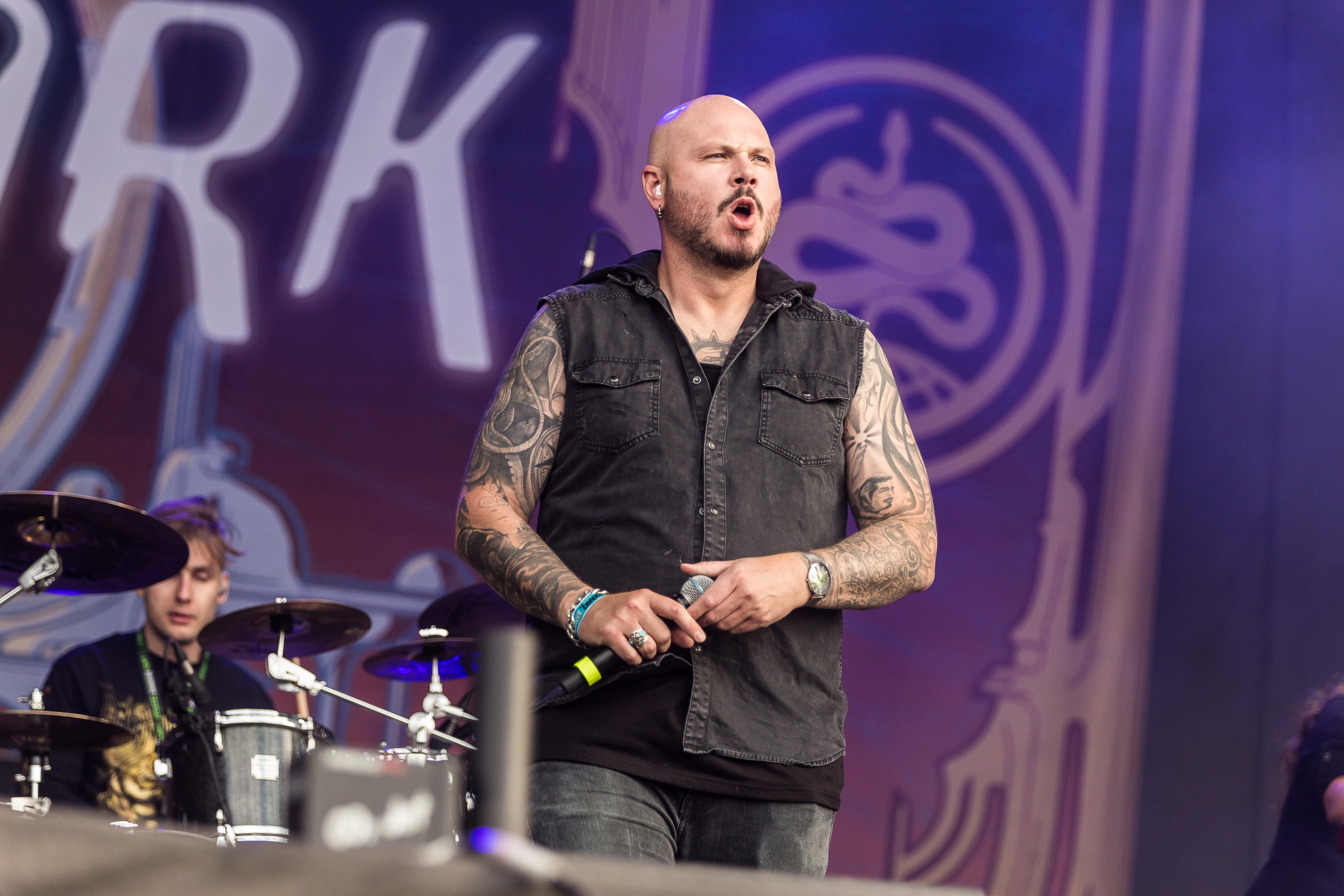
Singer Björn Strid

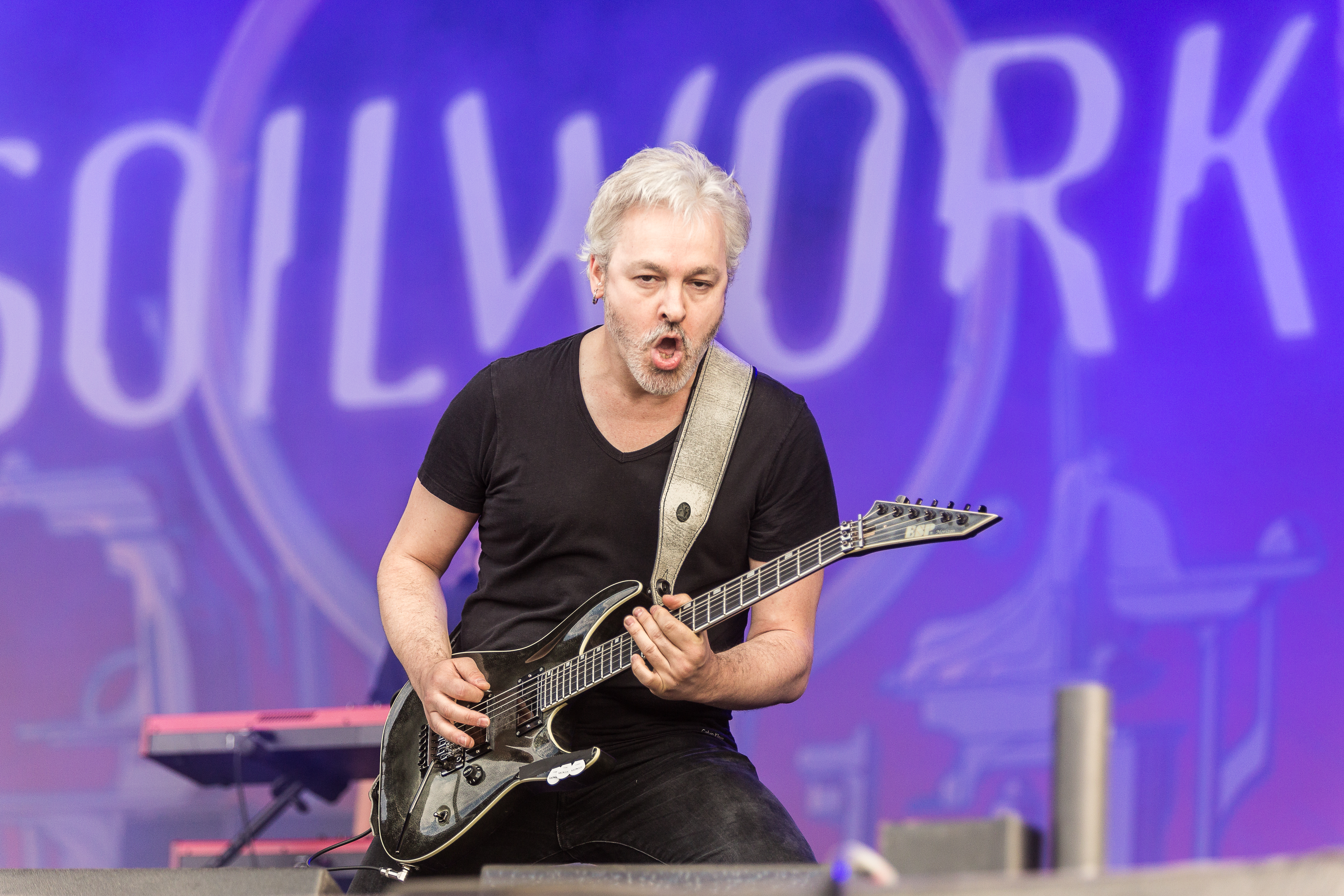
Guitarist Sylvain Coudret

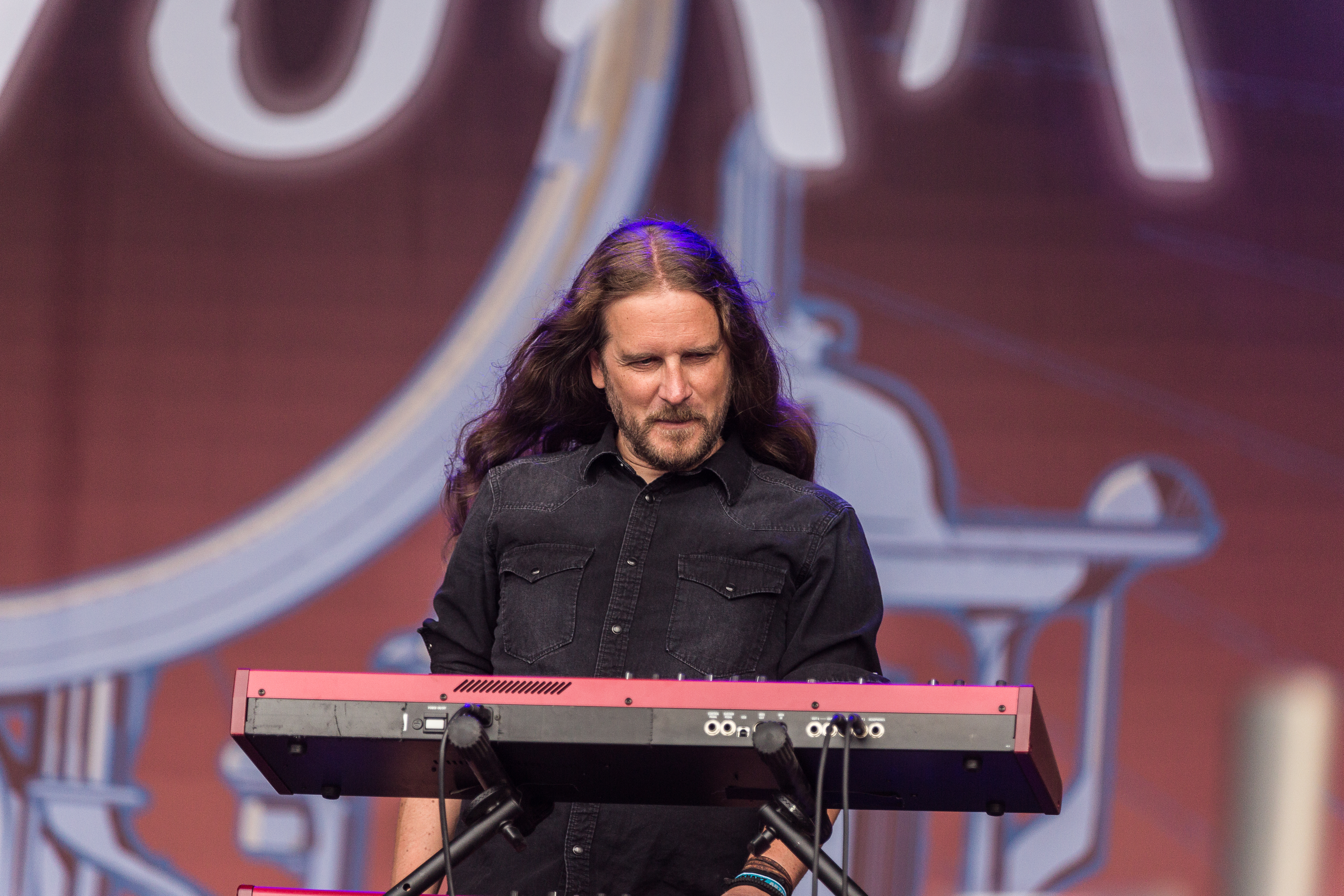
Keyboardist Sven Karlsson

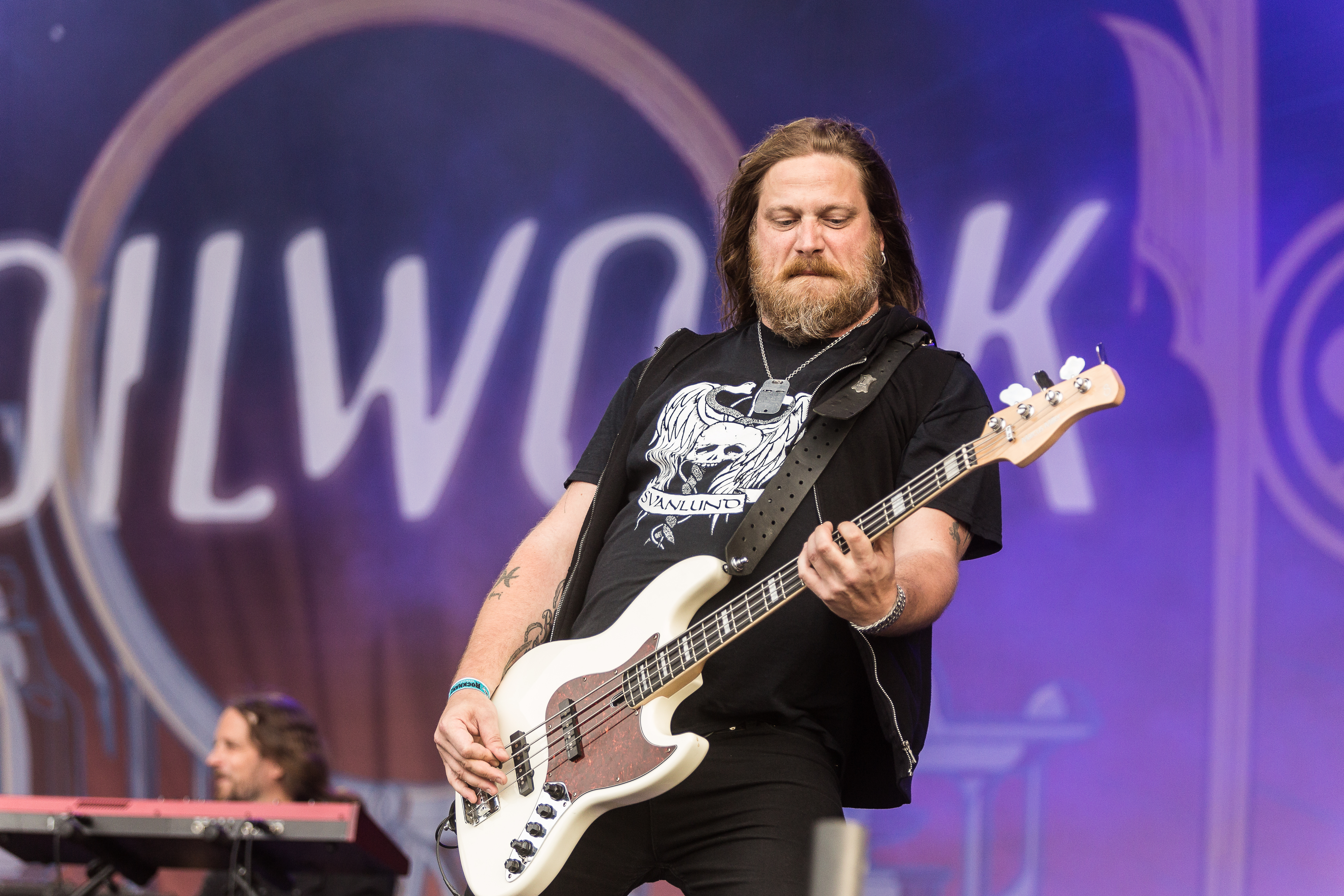
Bassist Rasmus Ehrnborn

== History ==
=== Early years (1995–2000) ===
The band was formed in late 1995, as Inferior Breed. Their sound was influenced by bands such as Pantera, Meshuggah, and Carcass. After changing their name to Soilwork in late 1996, they developed a more melodic sound. Soilwork started work on the demo In Dreams We Fall into the Eternal Lake. Before recording, bassist Carl-Gustav Döös left the group, leaving guitarist Peter Wichers to handle the bass tracks on the demo. Soilwork met Michael Amott of Arch Enemy, who owned a record store in Helsingborg and was given a copy of their demo. This led to the band signing with Listenable Records. The band underwent significant changes, which included the arrival of guitarist David Andersson.

In 1998, Soilwork added keyboardist Carlos Holmberg and bassist Ola Flink. The band recorded and released their debut album, Steelbath Suicide, in May of that year. Soon after, guitarist Ludvig Svartz and drummer Jimmy Persson left, citing "different musical opinions". Persson (now guitar and vocals in Faithful Darkness) was replaced with Henry Ranta, while Svartz was replaced with Peter Wichers' uncle, Ola Frenning. The band toured Europe in support of the album, sharing the stage with bands such as Darkane, Naglfar, and Krisiun.

In 1999, Soilwork recorded their second full-length album, The Chainheart Machine, released later that same year. The album received critical acclaim and led to a recording contract with Nuclear Blast, allowing the band to tour with Defleshed, Cannibal Corpse, and Dark Tranquillity.

=== Rise to popularity (2000–2006) ===
In 2000, after much touring, Soilwork returned to the studio to record their third full-length album, A Predator's Portrait. The release was well received and brought Soilwork to the forefront of the melodic death metal scene, alongside label mates In Flames. The band performed at Wacken Open Air that year and toured with Annihilator and Nevermore.

Following up on their success, Soilwork entered the studio in late 2001 to record the follow-up to A Predator's Portrait with Devin Townsend and Fredrik Nordström. Natural Born Chaos was released in early 2002, to much acclaim. Soilwork toured Europe to support the album and, for the first time, throughout the United States—first with Hypocrisy, Scar Culture, Chimaira, Unearth, and Killswitch Engage during the summer, and then alongside label mates In Flames during the fall. After touring, they began writing and recording their fifth album.

In December 2002, Soilwork began recording their fifth album. After recording, the band toured European with Children of Bodom and Shadows Fall throughout April and May. That month, Figure Number Five was released. In early June, drummer Henry Ranta left the band to focus on his personal life and was replaced a week later with Richard Evensand. The band embarked on another North American tour with In Flames, Chimaira, and Unearth. In September, Soilwork toured Japan with Children of Bodom. Days after a mini-tour through Japan, Soilwork toured Australia briefly. Later that year, they toured North America with Chimaira, As I Lay Dying and Bleeding Through. After the tour, Richard Evensand left the band to replace drummer Andols Herrick in Chimaira. Soilwork announced his temporary replacement as Dirk Verbeuren of Scarve. Verbeuren later became a full-time member. In early 2004, singer Björn "Speed" Strid recorded tracks with Italian melodic death metal band Disarmonia Mundi. During April, the band announced that it had extended its contract with Nuclear Blast Records. That month, the band toured Australia alongside Anthrax, Embodiment 12:14, and Killswitch Engage. In mid-2004, Soilwork toured Japan for a second time alongside Dark Tranquillity.

Soilwork entered Dug Out Studios on 14 September 2004, to begin recording their sixth full-length album, Stabbing the Drama. A week later, the band switched venues and recorded at Fascination Street Studios. Stabbing the Drama was released in early March 2005. The album entered the Finnish charts at number 19 and the Swedish charts at number 14. The band began to experience minor commercial success in the United States. Stabbing the Drama reached No. 12 and No. 21 on the Billboard Heatseeker and Independent album charts, respectively. The band participated in the 2005 Ozzfest, performing on the second stage. In November, the band toured the United States with Fear Factory. In late 2005, guitarist Peter Wichers left the band due to tour exhaustion and personal issues. The month, Strid announced a second album with Disarmonia Mundi. In May 2006, Daniel Antonsson was announced as Peter Wichers's replacement. Soilwork spent the summer appearing at festivals throughout Europe. In September, they toured the UK and Turkey. The band canceled the Turkish dates due to terrorist attacks and bombings against tourists there. In October, the band toured North America with Darkest Hour, Mnemic, and Threat Signal.

=== Transitional period and continued popularity (2007–2015) ===
In early March 2007, Soilwork began recording their seventh album, Sworn to a Great Divide. Late in June, Ola Frenning announced that the album was complete. Soilwork toured in the fall alongside Caliban, Sonic Syndicate, and Dark Tranquillity on the 'Eastpak Antidote' tour. The album was released on 19 October 2007, through Nuclear Blast. The album sounded closer to thrash than previous works, though still incorporating signature synth elements. The band took part in an American tour with co-headliners Lamb of God and Killswitch Engage, as well as DevilDriver. The tour began on 28 November 2007, at the Tsongas Arena in Lowell, Massachusetts, and concluded at the Santa Ana Star Center in Rio Rancho, New Mexico, on 17 December 2007. Dubbed The Clash of the Titans Tour 2007, the tour made a stop at the Nokia Live Theatre in Grand Prairie, TX, on 8 December 2007, to perform for the entire Dallas/Fort Worth metroplex. On 12 February 2008, an official statement was posted on Soilwork's website announcing that Ola Frenning and the band had parted ways. His replacement was Sylvain Coudret. In another statement on 18 September 2008, it was revealed that guitarist Daniel Antonsson would be replaced with the return of former guitarist and founding member Peter Wichers, and that Sylvain Coudret of Scarve, who had been performing session work as the second guitarist during the 2008 Summer festivals, became the band's permanent guitarist.

The band returned to the studio in early 2010 to write and record their eighth album, with Strid announcing in a MySpace bulletin on 22 January 2010, that the new album would be titled The Panic Broadcast. On 30 June 2010, The Sledgehammer Files: The Best of Soilwork 1998–2008 greatest hits compilation album was released, followed shortly by the band's new album, The Panic Broadcast, on 2 July in Europe and 13 July in North America.

On 26 June 2012, Soilwork announced that Peter Wichers had left the band for the second time. Following his departure, Wichers was replaced by David Andersson.

During a 2011 tour, Strid began considering the band's next album as a double album. He sought to challenge himself, opting to release a double album rather than a single one after Wichers' departure. He also aimed to demonstrate that the band could still produce a great album without one of their main composers. By the end of the year, Strid had written two songs and began collaborating with the band in March 2012. Soilwork announced they would begin recording on 23 August 2012.

The album, titled The Living Infinite, was released on 27 February 2013, in Asia, 1 March in Europe, 4 March in the UK, and 5 March in North America.

On 24 September 2014, Soilwork released an EP, Beyond the Infinite, exclusively in Asia. The EP features 5 unreleased tracks from the band's The Living Infinite album sessions.

On 5 December 2014, Soilwork frontman Strid confirmed that work had begun on a new album when he posted a picture on Facebook of himself listening to new demos. Strid also stated that Soilwork were sounding "better than ever". It was also confirmed that Soilwork had teamed up with Testament frontman Chuck Billy's Breaking Bands LLC management company for the album.

In June 2015, Soilwork announced that longtime bassist Ola Flink had parted ways with the band and would be replaced by new bassist Markus Wibom.

Soilwork supported Soulfly on their 2015 We Sold Our Souls to Metal Tour. Decapitated and Shattered Sun also joined the tour, which was scheduled for a 27-concert trek beginning on 30 September and concluding in Albuquerque, NM on 30 October. Then, Soilwork went on a European tour as headliners with HateSphere and French band T.A.N.K.

=== Departure of Dirk Verbeuren, death of David Andersson and more albums (2016–present) ===
On 15 July 2016, it was announced that longtime drummer Dirk Verbeuren had left the band to join Megadeth.

On 19 August 2016, Soilwork released a compilation album, Death Resonance, which featured a number of B-sides and rarities from five of their previous albums in addition to two new songs.

On 11 January 2019, Soilwork released Verkligheten, their first album with new drummer Bastian Thusgaard, and their first album in nearly four years. On 14 June 2019, the band officially released the Underworld EP, which consists of bonus tracks previously available only on physical editions of the band's recent Verkligheten album.

On 4 December 2020, Soilwork released an EP, A Whisp of the Atlantic, which is composed of songs the band recorded and released from late 2019 to mid 2020, along with the ambitious 16-minute title piece that opens the EP.

Soilwork announced in early 2022 that bassist Rasmus Ehrnborn had officially joined the band and contributed to the band's twelfth studio album, Övergivenheten, which was released on 19 August 2022.

On 14 September 2022, it was announced that guitarist and songwriter David Andersson, who had been with the band for 10 years, had died at the age of 47. Touring guitarist Simon Johansson, who had been performing with the band since 2019, was made a permanent member on 13 March 2023.

Soilwork is currently working on a new album, which is expected to be released in 2026.

== Band members ==
Current

- Björn "Speed" Strid – vocals (1995–present)
- Sven Karlsson – keyboards (2001–present)
- Sylvain Coudret – guitars (2008–present)
- Bastian Thusgaard – drums (2016–present)
- Rasmus Ehrnborn – bass (2022–present; touring 2019–2022)
- Simon Johansson – guitars (2023–present; touring 2019–2023)

== Discography ==
Studio albums

- Steelbath Suicide (1998)
- The Chainheart Machine (1999)
- A Predator's Portrait (2001)
- Natural Born Chaos (2002)
- Figure Number Five (2003)
- Stabbing the Drama (2005)
- Sworn to a Great Divide (2007)
- The Panic Broadcast (2010)
- The Living Infinite (2013)
- The Ride Majestic (2015)
- Verkligheten (2019)
- Övergivenheten (2022)
