= In Flames discography =

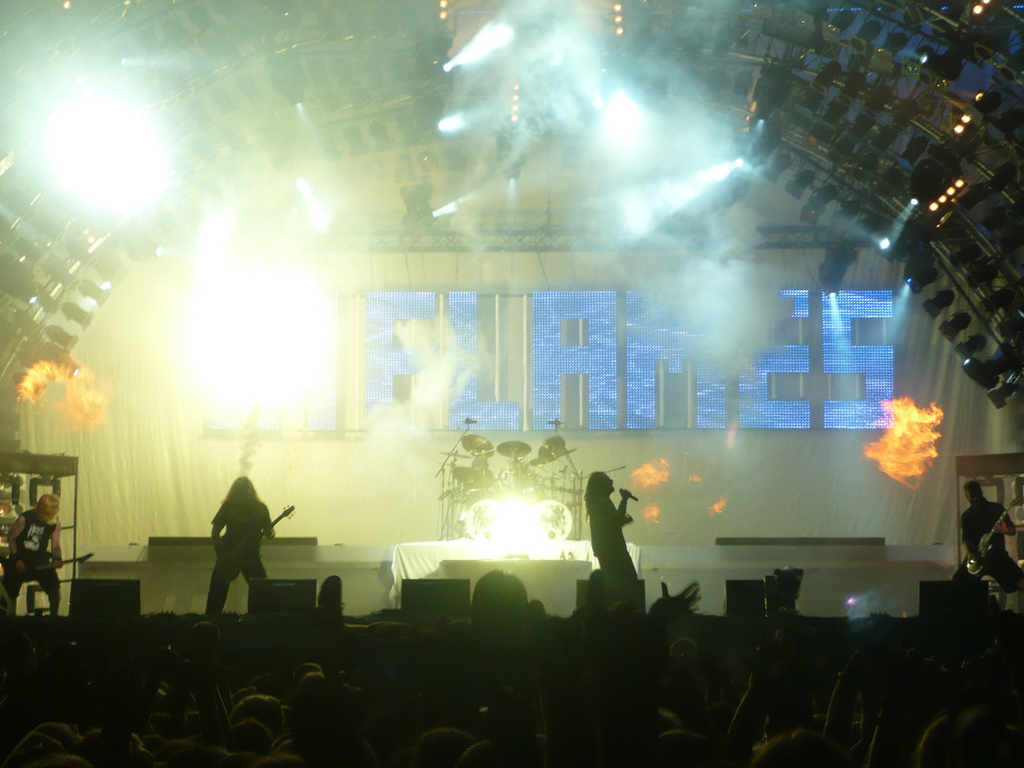
- In Flames performing at Wacken Open Air in 2007
- Studio albums: 14
- Extended plays: 8
- Live albums: 2
- Singles: 31
- Video albums: 2
- Music videos: 46

The discography of In Flames, a Swedish heavy metal band formed in the early 1990s, consists of fourteen studio albums, two live albums, eight extended plays, thirty-one singles, two video albums, and forty-six music videos. Signed with Wrong Again Records, In Flames released their full-length debut, Lunar Strain (1994), followed by the EP Subterranean (1995). After signing to Nuclear Blast, they released The Jester Race (1996). The following year, they issued their second EP, Black-Ash Inheritance, and the full-length album Whoracle. The band's fourth studio album, Colony (1999), reached the top 30 in Sweden and Finland. Clayman followed in the same vein the next year, reaching the top 20 in the same countries. The tour to promote it was released as The Tokyo Showdown (2001) live album, which also charted in Sweden and Finland, breaking the top 40. Reroute to Remain (2002) peaked at number 5 on the Swedish and Finnish charts, and number 10 on the Billboard Independent Albums chart. The album was accompanied by the band's first single, "Cloud Connected", which failed to chart.

In 2003, In Flames released Trigger, an EP that features the title track backed with a remix, a cover of Genesis' "Land of Confusion", and two music videos. It was followed by Soundtrack to Your Escape in 2004, which peaked at number 3 in Sweden, and number 7 on the Billboard Independent Albums chart. The album produced a single for "The Quiet Place", which followed the success of the album and reached number 2 in their home country. Used & Abused: In Live We Trust (2005), was the band's debut video album, and their first release to top the Swedish chart. Following the same blueprint, Come Clarity (2006) topped the Finnish and Swedish charts, and reached number 2 on the Billboard Top Independent Albums, number 6 in Germany, as well as the top 30 in three additional European countries. The album was backed by the single "Come Clarity", which was released in a limited edition that reached number 52 in their home country. Before they released their ninth studio album, In Flames issued the single "The Mirror's Truth", which peaked at number 5 in Finland. Their ninth studio album, A Sense of Purpose (2008), topped the Swedish and Billboard Independent Albums charts, and reached top 10 in Austria, Finland, and Germany. In Flames were featured on Pendulum's 2010 album Immersion, on a song called "Self vs Self". In Flames signed with Century Media after completing their recording contract with Nuclear Blast in 2011. Sounds of a Playground Fading was then issued as the band's tenth studio album, peaking at number 1 in Germany. It debuted and peaked at number 27 on the Billboard 200, becoming their highest-charting album in the United States, with a single, "Where the Dead Ships Dwell", reaching number 35 on the Billboard Mainstream Rock chart. As of 2011, In Flames have sold over 2.5 million albums worldwide.

== Albums ==
=== Studio albums ===
List of studio albums, with selected chart positions
Title	Album details	Peak chart positions										Sales	Certifications
Title	Album details	SWE	AUT	FIN	FRA	GER	JPN	NOR	SWI	UK	US	Sales	Certifications
Lunar Strain	Released: 1 April 1994; Label: Wrong Again; Formats: CD, LP, DL	—	—	—	—	—	—	—	—	—	—		
The Jester Race	Released: 20 February 1996; Label: Nuclear Blast; Formats: CD, CS, LP, DL	—	—	—	—	—	—	—	—	—	—	US: 11,317+	
Whoracle	Released: 27 October 1997; Label: Nuclear Blast; Formats: CD, CS, LP, DL	—	—	33	—	78	75	—	—	—	—		
Colony	Released: 31 May 1999; Label: Nuclear Blast; Formats: CD, CS, LP, DL	34	—	27	—	69	35	—	—	—	—	US: 22,810+	
Clayman	Released: 3 July 2000; Label: Nuclear Blast; Formats: CD, CS, LP, DL	17	48	20	—	16	36	—	26	—	—	US: 39,787+	
Reroute to Remain	Released: 2 September 2002; Label: Nuclear Blast; Formats: CD, CS, LP, DL	5	67	5	81	23	23	—	—	—	—	US: 59,010+	
Soundtrack to Your Escape	Released: 29 March 2004; Label: Nuclear Blast; Formats: CD, CS, LP, DL	3	25	13	82	28	29	36	—	132	145	US: 100,000+	
Come Clarity	Released: 3 February 2006; Label: Nuclear Blast; Formats: CD, LP, DL	1	16	1	89	6	17	27	30	67	58	US: 150,000+	
A Sense of Purpose	Released: 4 April 2008; Label: Nuclear Blast; Formats: CD, LP, DL	1	6	3	64	6	14	15	29	54	28	US: 20,000 (1st week); SWE: 20,000+; WW: 275,000+	SWE: Gold
Sounds of a Playground Fading	Released: 21 June 2011; Label: Century Media; Formats: CD, LP, DL	2	6	4	47	1	24	10	12	74	27	US: 14,000 (1st week); SWE: 20,000+	SWE: Gold
Siren Charms	Released: 9 September 2014; Label: Sony; Formats: CD, LP, DL	1	7	1	87	7	23	6	9	52	26	US: 9,000 (1st week)	
Battles	Released: 11 November 2016; Label: Eleven Seven, Nuclear Blast; Formats: CD, LP, DL	2	8	3	101	7	46	13	13	75	60		
I, the Mask	Released: 1 March 2019; Label: Eleven Seven, Nuclear Blast; Formats: CD, LP, DL	1	1	4	53	2	60	9	3	66	121		
Foregone	Released: 10 February 2023; Label: Nuclear Blast; Formats: CD, CS, LP, DL	1	1	4	63	1	21	10	1	79	110		
— denotes a recording that did not chart or was not released in that territory.

=== Live albums ===
List of live albums, with selected chart positions
Title	Album details	Peak chart positions		
Title	Album details	SWE	FIN	JPN
The Tokyo Showdown	Released: 6 August 2001; Label: Nuclear Blast; Formats: CD, LP	43	31	88
Sounds from the Heart of Gothenburg	Released: 23 September 2016; Label: Nuclear Blast; Formats: CD, LP	44	—	—

== Extended plays ==
List of extended plays albums, with selected chart positions
Title	EP details	Peak chart positions
Title	EP details	JPN
Subterranean	Released: 15 June 1995; Label: Wrong Again; Format: CD, 12"	—
Black-Ash Inheritance	Released: 15 August 1997; Label: Nuclear Blast; Formats: Shaped CD	—
Trigger	Released: 10 June 2003; Label: Nuclear Blast; Formats: CD, 10"	133
Come Clarity – EP	Released: 13 December 2006; Label: Black Lodge; Formats: 7"	—
8 Songs	Released: 7 June 2011; Label: Century Media; Formats: CD	—
Down, Wicked & No Good	Released: 17 November 2017; Label: Nuclear Blast; Formats: CD, digital download	—
Clayman 2020	Released: 24 July 2020; Label: Nuclear Blast; Formats: CD, digital download	—
Hell Is Overcrowded and Heaven's Full of Sinners	Released: 11 January 2023; Label: Nuclear Blast; Formats: CD	—

== Singles ==
List of singles, with selected chart positions, showing year released and album name
Title	Year	Peak chart positions							Album
Title	Year	SWE	AUT	FIN	GER	US Sales	US Act. Rock	US Main. Rock	Album
"Cloud Connected"	2002	—	—	—	—	—	—	—	Reroute to Remain
"The Quiet Place"	2004	2	—	16	91	—	—	—	Soundtrack to Your Escape
"Take This Life" (Note: "Take This Life" and "Leeches" were released together as a double A-side single in Germany.)	2006	—	—	—	—	—	—	—	Come Clarity
"Leeches"	2006	—	—	—	—	—	—	—	Come Clarity
"Come Clarity"	2006	52	—	—	—	—	—	—	Come Clarity
"The Mirror's Truth"	2008	14	51	5	72	—	—	—	A Sense of Purpose
"Alias"	2008	—	—	—	—	—	—	—	A Sense of Purpose
"Delight and Angers"	2009	—	—	—	—	—	—	—	A Sense of Purpose
"Deliver Us"	2011	—	—	—	—	—	—	—	Sounds of a Playground Fading
"Where the Dead Ships Dwell"	2011	—	—	—	—	17	33	35	Sounds of a Playground Fading
"Ropes"	2013	—	—	—	—	—	—	—	Sounds of a Playground Fading
"Rusted Nail"	2014	—	—	—	—	—	—	—	Siren Charms
"Through Oblivion"	2014	—	—	—	—	—	—	—	Siren Charms
"Paralyzed"	2015	—	—	—	—	—	—	—	Siren Charms
"The End"	2016	—	—	—	—	—	—	—	Battles
"The Truth"	2016	—	—	—	—	—	—	17	Battles
"Through My Eyes"	2016	—	—	—	—	—	—	—	Battles
"Save Me"	2016	—	—	—	—	—	—	—	Battles
"Here Until Forever"	2017	—	—	—	—	—	—	26	Battles
"I Am Above"	2018	—	—	—	—	—	—	—	I, the Mask
"This Is Our House"	2018	—	—	—	—	—	—	—	I, the Mask
"I, the Mask"	2019	—	—	—	—	—	—	—	I, the Mask
"Burn"	2019	—	—	—	—	—	—	—	I, the Mask
"Call My Name"	2019	—	—	—	—	—	—	—	I, the Mask
"Follow Me"	2019	—	—	—	—	—	—	—	I, the Mask
"Not Alone"	2020	—	—	—	—	—	—	—	I, the Mask
"State of Slow Decay"	2022	—	—	—	—	—	—	—	Foregone
"The Great Deceiver"	2022	—	—	—	—	—	—	—	Foregone
"Foregone, Pt. 1"	2022	—	—	—	—	—	—	—	Foregone
"Foregone, Pt. 2"	2022	—	—	—	—	—	—	—	Foregone
"Meet Your Maker"	2023	—	—	—	—	—	—	—	Foregone
"These Scars Won't Define Us" (Machine Head featuring In Flames, Lacuna Coil & Unearth)	2024	—	—	—	—	—	—	—	Non-album singles
"—" denotes a recording that did not chart or was not released in that territory.

== Videos ==
=== Video albums ===
List of video albums, with selected chart positions
Title	Album details	Peak chart positions				
Title	Album details	SWE DVD	FIN DVD	GER	JPN	US Video
Used & Abused: In Live We Trust	Released: 25 July 2005; Label: Nuclear Blast; Formats: DVD, CD	1	1	56	129	30
Sounds from the Heart of Gothenburg	Released: 23 September 2016; Label: Nuclear Blast; Formats: Blu-ray, DVD, CD	– (Note: Sounds from the Heart of Gothenburg peaked at number 44 on the Swedish Albums Chart.)	—	17	—	—

=== Music videos ===
List of music videos, showing year released and director
Title	Year	Director(s)
"Artifacts of the Black Rain"	1996	—N/a
"Jotun"	1997	—N/a
"Food for the Gods"	1997	—N/a
"Ordinary Story"	1999	Tamara Jordan
"Pinball Map"	2000	Artoon Animation
"Only for the Weak"	2000	Roger Johansson
"Cloud Connected"	2002	Roger Johansson
"Trigger"	2003	Roger Johansson
"System"	2003	Patric Ullaeus
"The Quiet Place"	2004	Patric Ullaeus
"Touch of Red"	2004	Patric Ullaeus
"Watch Them Feed"	2005	Ronald Matthes
"Borders and Shading"	2005	Patric Ullaeus
"Evil in a Closet"	2005	Patric Ullaeus
"Episode 666"	2005	Patric Ullaeus
"Dial 595-Escape"	2005	Patric Ullaeus
"F(r)iend"	2005	Patric Ullaeus
"My Sweet Shadow"	2005	Patric Ullaeus
"Like You Better Dead"	2005	Thomas Tjäder
"Take This Life"	2006	Patric Ullaeus
"Come Clarity"	2006	Lex Halaby
"The Mirror's Truth"	2008	Popcore
"Alias"	2008	Patric Ullaeus
"Delight and Angers"	2009	Patric Ullaeus
"Deliver Us"	2011	Patric Ullaeus
"Where the Dead Ships Dwell"	2011	Patric Ullaeus
"Ropes"	2013	Erik Engstrand
"Sounds of a Playground Fading"	2013	Patric Ullaeus
"Rusted Nail"	2014	Patric Ullaeus
"Through Oblivion"	2014	Patric Ullaeus
"Everything's Gone"	2014	Niclas Sandberg, Jonas Eklöf, Ludvig Orvegård
"Paralyzed"	2015	Patric Ullaeus
"The End"	2016	Patric Ullaeus
"The Truth"	2016	Patric Ullaeus
"Here Until Forever"	2017	Luis Tellez
"Save Me"	2017	Patric Ullaeus
"I Am Above"	2018	Patric Ullaeus
"Call My Name"	2019	Blaine Moir, J. Spencer
"Pinball Map" (re-recorded)	2020	Chad Sikora
"Only for the Weak" (re-recorded)	2020	Patric Ullaeus
"Stay with Me"	2020	Patric Ullaeus
"State of Slow Decay"	2022	Patric Ullaeus
"The Great Deceiver"	2022	Patric Ullaeus
"Foregone, Pt. 1"	2022	Oleg Rooz
"Foregone, Pt. 2"	2022	Vicente Cordero
"Meet Your Maker"	2023	Patric Ullaeus
"In the Dark"	2024	Oscar Dziedziela
