= Sounds from the Heart of Gothenburg =

Live album by In Flames
- Released: 23 September 2016
- Recorded: 8 November 2014
- Venue: Scandinavium in Gothenburg, Sweden
- Genre: Alternative metal, melodic death metal
- Length: 41:39 (CD 1); 47:32 (CD 2)
- Label: Nuclear Blast

In Flames chronology
| Siren Charms (2014) | Sounds from the Heart of Gothenburg (2016) | Battles (2016) |

Sounds from the Heart of Gothenburg is the second live album by Swedish heavy metal band In Flames. It was filmed on 8 November 2014 in front of a sold-out venue of 10,000 fans, right inside the Scandinavium in the band's hometown Gothenburg, Sweden. The concert was directed by Patric Ullaeus. It is the last release to feature long time drummer Daniel Svensson who left the band in 2015.

== Background ==
Commenting on the release, guitarist Björn Gelotte said "This DVD is for everyone who [has] been [sic] following our career; we have songs from the early years, the middle years and the new era".

== Reception ==
Adam Rees of Classic Rock magazine gave the album a positive review, calling it "another accomplished landmark for this enduring band", and rating it 3 and a half stars.

== Track listing ==
CD 1
| No. | Title | Length |
|---|---|---|
| 1. | "In Plain View" | 5:47 |
| 2. | "Everything's Gone" | 3:31 |
| 3. | "Fear Is the Weakness" | 3:49 |
| 4. | "Trigger" | 4:28 |
| 5. | "Resin" | 3:36 |
| 6. | "Where the Dead Ships Dwell" | 4:26 |
| 7. | "With Eyes Wide Open" | 4:04 |
| 8. | "Paralyzed" | 4:21 |
| 9. | "Through Oblivion" | 3:42 |
| 10. | "Ropes" | 3:55 |
| Total length: | | 41:39 |

CD 2
| No. | Title | Length |
|---|---|---|
| 1. | "Delight and Angers" | 4:05 |
| 2. | "Cloud Connected" | 5:09 |
| 3. | "Only for the Weak" | 5:06 |
| 4. | "The Chosen Pessimist" | 7:56 |
| 5. | "The Quiet Place" | 3:34 |
| 6. | "When the World Explodes" | 4:55 |
| 7. | "Rusted Nail" | 4:45 |
| 8. | "The Mirror's Truth" | 3:14 |
| 9. | "Deliver Us" | 4:34 |
| 10. | "Take This Life" | 4:14 |
| Total length: | | 47:32 |

== Personnel ==
In Flames

- Anders Fridén – vocals
- Björn Gelotte – guitars
- Niclas Engelin – guitars
- Peter Iwers – bass
- Daniel Svensson – drums
