= The Tokyo Showdown =

Live album by In Flames
- Released: 4 September 2001
- Recorded: November 2000; Tokyo, Japan
- Genre: Melodic death metal
- Length: 60:33
- Label: Nuclear Blast
- Producer: Anders Fridén; In Flames

In Flames chronology
Clayman (2000)	The Tokyo Showdown (2001)	Reroute to Remain (2002)

Professional ratings
Review scores
Source	Rating
AllMusic	link
Kerrang!	4/5 stars

The Tokyo Showdown is the first live album by Swedish heavy metal band In Flames. It was recorded during their Japanese tour in 2000 at their show in Tokyo. During their performance of "Scorn" they incorporated the opening riffs of Slayer's "Raining Blood".

The album title was inspired by the action film Showdown in Little Tokyo.

== Track listing ==
No.	Title	Length
1.	"Bullet Ride" (from Clayman, 2000)	4:41
2.	"Embody the Invisible" (from Colony, 1999)	3:42
3.	"Jotun" (from Whoracle, 1997)	3:33
4.	"Food for the Gods" (from Whoracle, 1997)	4:24
5.	"Moonshield" (from The Jester Race, 1996)	4:25
6.	"Clayman" (from Clayman, 2000)	3:36
7.	"Swim" (from Clayman, 2000)	3:21
8.	"Behind Space" (from Lunar Strain, 1994)	3:52
9.	"Only for the Weak" (from Clayman, 2000)	4:31
10.	"Gyroscope" (from Whoracle, 1997)	3:25
11.	"Scorn" (from Colony, 1999)	3:50
12.	"Ordinary Story" (from Colony, 1999)	4:15
13.	"Pinball Map" (from Clayman, 2000)	4:33
14.	"Colony" (from Colony, 1999)	4:47
15.	"Episode 666" (from Whoracle, 1997)	3:37

=== Bonus disc ===
On the LP version and on the two-CD version released by Scarecrow Records (under license by Nuclear Blast) there is a bonus disc with additional tracks.

No.	Title	Length
1.	"Clad in Shadows '99"	2:24
2.	"Strong and Smart"	2:33
3.	"Man Made God"	4:11
4.	"Behind Space" (live)	3:37
5.	"Goliaths Disarm Their Davids"	4:55

== Personnel ==
- Anders Fridén – vocals
- Björn Gelotte – guitars
- Jesper Strömblad – guitars
- Peter Iwers – bass
- Daniel Svensson – drums
- Mixed and produced by In Flames at Studio Fredman during the spring of 2001
- Mastered by Göran Finnberg at The Mastering Room
- Artwork and design by Niklas Sundin and Cabin Fever Media
- Masayuki Noda – photography
