= Where the Dead Ships Dwell =

Single by In Flames

from the album Sounds of a Playground Fading
- Released: 15 November 2011
- Recorded: 11 October 2010 – January 25, 2011
- Studio: IF Studios, Gothenburg, Sweden
- Genre: Alternative metal
- Length: 4:27
- Label: Century Media
- Songwriter(s): Anders Fridén, Björn Gelotte
- Producer(s): Roberto Laghi, Anders Fridén

In Flames singles chronology
"Deliver Us" (2011)	"Where the Dead Ships Dwell" (2011)	"Ropes" (2013)

"Where the Dead Ships Dwell" is a song by Swedish heavy metal band In Flames. It was released as the second single from the band's tenth studio album, Sounds of a Playground Fading. The song is one of the band's most successful singles in the US, peaking at no. 33 on the Billboard Active Rock chart.

== Music video ==
The song's music video was directed by Patric Ullaeus.

The video features several shots of grainy footage and is centered on a woman who wonders around a forest, a ship yard, and a rock pit. There are also shots of a figure dressed in all black, someone dressed as the Jester Head, and an old man with a rapidly moving eye.

== Track listing ==
CD single

No.	Title	Length
1.	"Where the Dead Ships Dwell"	4:27
2.	"Where the Dead Ships Dwell (Radio Edit)"	3:15
3.	"Where the Dead Ships Dwell (Casper Remix)"	4:05
4.	"Where the Dead Ships Dwell (The Qemists Remix)"	5:15
5.	"Where the Dead Ships Dwell (Kristof Bathory – Dawn of Ashes Remix)"	4:44
Total length:		22:17

Promo single

No.	Title	Length
1.	"Where the Dead Ships Dwell (Radio Edit)"	3:15
2.	"Where the Dead Ships Dwell (Instrumental)"	4:25
Total length:		7:40

== Charts ==
Chart (2011–2012)	Peak position
US Active Rock (Billboard)	33
US Mainstream Rock (Billboard)	35
US Hot Singles Sales (Billboard)	17
US Dance Singles Sales (Billboard)	4

== Personnel ==
In Flames

- Anders Fridén – vocals
- Björn Gelotte – guitars
- Peter Iwers – bass
- Daniel Svensson – drums

Additional

- Örjan Örnkloo – keyboards
