= Used & Abused: In Live We Trust =

Video album by In Flames
- Released: 18 June 2005
- Recorded: 7 September, 27 December 2004
- Genre: Melodic death metal, alternative metal
- Label: Nuclear Blast
- Producer: Patric Ullaeus

In Flames chronology
| Soundtrack to Your Escape (2004) | Used & Abused: In Live We Trust (2005) | Come Clarity (2006) |

Used & Abused: In Live We Trust is the first DVD release by Swedish heavy metal band In Flames, released on 18 June 2005. It was also released in a limited edition two-CD / two-DVD boxset. It was given a rating of nine by Chronicles of Chaos.

== DVD disc one ==
=== Live at Sticky Fingers – 7 September 2004 (90 minutes) ===
1. "F(r)iend" (Soundtrack to Your Escape)
2. "The Quiet Place" (Soundtrack to Your Escape)
3. "Dead Alone" (Soundtrack to Your Escape)
4. "Touch of Red" (Soundtrack to Your Escape)
5. "Like You Better Dead" (Soundtrack to Your Escape)
6. "My Sweet Shadow" (Soundtrack to Your Escape)
7. "Evil in a Closet" (Soundtrack to Your Escape)
8. "In Search for I" (Soundtrack to Your Escape)
9. "Borders and Shading" (Soundtrack to Your Escape)
10. "Superhero of the Computer Rage" (Soundtrack to Your Escape)
11. "Dial 595–Escape" (Soundtrack to Your Escape)
12. "Bottled" (Soundtrack to Your Escape)
13. "Behind Space" (Lunar Strain)
14. "Artifacts of the Black Rain" (The Jester Race)
15. "Moonshield" (The Jester Race)
16. "Food for the Gods" (Whoracle)
17. "Jotun" (Whoracle)
18. "Embody the Invisible" (Colony)
19. "Colony" (Colony)
20. "Pinball Map" (Clayman)
21. "Only for the Weak" (Clayman)
22. "Trigger" (Reroute to Remain)
23. "Cloud Connected" (Reroute to Remain)

=== Live at Hammersmith, London – 27 December 2004 (40 minutes) ===
1. "Pinball Map" (Clayman)
2. "System" (Reroute to Remain)
3. "Fuckin' Hostile (Pantera Cover) / Behind Space" (Lunar Strain)
4. "Cloud Connected" (Reroute to Remain)
5. "In Search for I" (Soundtrack to Your Escape)
6. "The Quiet Place" (Soundtrack to Your Escape)
7. "Trigger" (Reroute to Remain)
8. "Touch of Red" (Soundtrack to Your Escape)
9. "My Sweet Shadow" (Soundtrack to Your Escape)

=== Soundtrack Tour 2004 - Live ===
1. "Only for the Weak" (Clayman)
2. "Clayman" (Clayman)

=== Hidden Bonus Video ===
1. "Episode 666" (Whoracle) Live at Sticky Fingers: To see this video you need to skip to the next chapter while watching "Clayman" from "Soundtrack Tour 2004". Alternately, jump to title 4, chapter 1.

== DVD Disc two ==
=== Live in Madrid ===
1. "System" (Reroute to Remain)

=== Live in Australia/Japan ===
1. "Dial 595 - Escape" (Soundtrack to Your Escape)

=== Soundcheck in London ===
1. "Dial 595 - Escape" (Soundtrack to Your Escape)

=== Soundcheck in London ===
1. "Touch of Red" (Soundtrack to Your Escape)

=== Promotional Videos ===
1. "F(r)iend" (Soundtrack to Your Escape)
2. "My Sweet Shadow" (Soundtrack to Your Escape)
3. "Touch of Red" (Soundtrack to Your Escape)
4. "The Quiet Place" (Soundtrack to Your Escape)

=== Jester TV – Universal Access (50 minutes) ===
- About In Flames
- Interviews with band members
- About the Metallica show in Madrid
- Behind "The Quiet Place" video shoot
- Behind the "Touch of Red" video shoot
- Other videos: "F(r)iend", "Evil in a Closet"
- About the start of the "Soundtrack" tour 2004
- Summer festival
- "Like You Better Dead" at Metaltown
- About the Japanese Tour
- About the Australian Tour
- L.A. – Roxy
- About the Hammersmith concert
- About the Judas Priest Tour
- 666 at Scandinavium
- Backstage tour
- About the Sticky Fingers concert

=== Hidden bonus video ===
1. "Borders and Shading": To see this video you need to skip to the next chapter while watching "Dial 595 - Escape" from "Videos: Live in Australia/Japan". Alternately, jump to title 8, chapter 1.

=== Unused footage ===
During the Hammersmith performance In Flames also performed: "Clayman," "Only For The Weak," and "Episode 666" which are not included on the DVD.

== DVD disc three/CD disc one (Live at Hammersmith) ==
1. Pinball Map (4:29)
2. System (3:45)
3. Behind Space (3:30)
4. Cloud Connected (4:41)
5. In Search for I (3:33)
6. The Quiet Place (3:47)
7. Trigger (4:40)
8. Touch of Red (3:20)
9. My Sweet Shadow (4:34)

== DVD disc four/CD disc two (Live at Sticky Fingers) ==
1. F(r)iend (3:26)
2. Dead Alone (3:17)
3. Like You Better Dead (3:38)
4. Evil in a Closet (3:51)
5. Borders And Shading (4:06)
6. Superhero of the Computer Rage (4:02)
7. Dial 595-Escape (3:32)
8. Bottled (3:09)
9. Artifacts of the Black Rain (3:08)
10. Moonshield (4:27)
11. Food for the Gods (4:09)
12. Jotun (3:36)
13. Colony (4:28)
14. Only for the Weak (4:52)
