= The Quiet Place =

Single by In Flames

from the album Soundtrack to Your Escape
- Released: 1 March 2004
- Genre: Alternative metal
- Length: 3:45 (album version); 3:23 (edit)
- Label: Nuclear Blast
- Songwriter(s): Anders Fridén; Björn Gelotte; Jesper Strömblad
- Producer(s): Daniel Bergstrand

In Flames singles chronology
"Trigger" (2003)	"The Quiet Place" (2004)	"Take This Life/Leeches" (2006)

"The Quiet Place" is a song by Swedish heavy metal band In Flames. It was released in 2004, as the first single from their album Soundtrack to Your Escape. It is the third single overall in the band's career. The single is the band's most successful in their home country of Sweden, peaking at no. 2 on the Swedish Singles chart.

The remix of "My Sweet Shadow" was done by Örjan Örnkloo. The song "Värmlandsvisan" is a cover of the Swedish folk song "Dear Old Stockholm".

== Track listing ==
No.	Title	Length
1.	"The Quiet Place"	3:23
2.	"My Sweet Shadow" (Remix)	4:46
3.	"Värmlandsvisan" (Live)	1:45

Enhanced CD bonus tracks
No.	Title	Length
4.	"The Quiet Place" (Music Video)	3:23
5.	"Studio Recording Session"	4:12
6.	"Screensaver"

Alternate version
No.	Title	Length
1.	"The Quiet Place"	3:45
2.	"Borders and Shading"	4:22
3.	"Touch of Red"	4:13

== Music video ==
The song "The Quiet Place" also featured a video, directed by Patric Ullaeus. Featuring Ullaeus' camera angles and saturated colors, the video features a story of lead singer Anders Fridén going to see a movie, falling asleep in the theater and, as the band members put it, "waking up in his own head".

== Charts ==
Chart (2004)	Peak position
Finland (The Official Finnish Charts)	16
Germany (Official German Charts)	91
Sweden (Sverigetopplistan)	2

== Personnel ==
In Flames

- Anders Fridén – vocals
- Björn Gelotte – guitars
- Jesper Strömblad – guitars
- Peter Iwers – bass
- Daniel Svensson – drums
