= The Mirror's Truth =

Single by In Flames

from the album A Sense of Purpose
- Released: 7 March 2008
- Recorded: 2007
- Genre: Alternative metal
- Length: 13:46
- Label: Nuclear Blast
- Songwriter(s): Anders Fridén; Björn Gelotte; Jesper Strömblad

In Flames singles chronology
"Come Clarity" (2006)	"The Mirror's Truth" (2008)	"Alias" (2008)

"The Mirror's Truth" is a song by Swedish heavy metal band In Flames from their ninth album, A Sense of Purpose. It was released as a single/EP on 7 March 2008.

The disc contains the title track and three songs that did not appear on the album, of which two are previously unreleased. The cover artwork was created by Alex Pardee, who had designed the artwork for the whole A Sense of Purpose album. The music video was shot in an abandoned power plant in Scharins, Skellefteå, Sweden, and debuted on Myspace on 18 February 2008.

"The Mirror's Truth" is one of the songs chosen for the Madden NFL 09 video game soundtrack. It is also featured in another video game, MX vs. ATV Reflex. The same version of "Abnegation" appeared on Viva La Bands, Volume 2.

== Track listing ==
No.	Title	Length
1.	"The Mirror's Truth"	3:02
2.	"Eraser"	3:22
3.	"Tilt"	3:49
4.	"Abnegation"	3:43

== Charts ==
Chart (2008)	Peak position
Austria (Ö3 Austria Top 40)	51
Finland (The Official Finnish Charts)	5
Germany (Official German Charts)	72
Sweden (Sverigetopplistan)	14

== Personnel ==
- Anders Fridén – vocals
- Björn Gelotte – guitars
- Jesper Strömblad – guitars
- Peter Iwers – bass
- Daniel Svensson – drums
