= Used and Abused =

Used and Abused may refer to:

- Used & Abused: In Live We Trust, 2005 DVD by In Flames
- Used and Abused (album), 2008 studio album by Danger Radio
