= Come Clarity =

Studio album by In Flames
- Released: 3 February 2006
- Genre: Melodic death metal; alternative metal; metalcore
- Length: 48:06
- Label: Ferret; Nuclear Blast; Toy's Factory
- Producer: Anders Fridén; Björn Gelotte; Jesper Strömblad

In Flames chronology
Soundtrack to Your Escape (2004)	Come Clarity (2006)	A Sense of Purpose (2008)

Singles from Come Clarity
- 1. "Take This Life / Leeches" Released: February 2006; 2. "Come Clarity" Released: 18 August 2006

Professional ratings
Review scores
Source	Rating
AllMusic	4/5 stars
Drowned in Sound	8/10
Pitchfork Media	7.3/10
PopMatters	8/10
Punknews.org	3.5/5 stars

Come Clarity is the eighth studio album by Swedish heavy metal band In Flames, released in February 2006. It was originally going to be called Crawl Through Knives but was changed during development.

The album features the artwork of Derek Hess, who is popular among metal bands and has produced artwork for Converge and Sepultura amongst others.

The songs "Take This Life" and "Come Clarity" feature accompanying music videos. "Take This Life" is also a playable track in the video game Guitar Hero III: Legends of Rock.

== Musical style ==
Stylistically the album borrows from the band's earlier, heavier roots, with elements of the later style still present. It features the return of the guitar harmonies and solos of the band, and can be described as a combination of their older and newer sound.

The song "Dead End" is the fourth In Flames song to feature female vocals (the others are "Everlost, Pt. 2" from Lunar Strain, "Whoracle" from Whoracle, and "Metaphor" from Reroute to Remain).

== Sales and awards ==
The album debuted at number 1 in Sweden and number 58 on the American Billboard 200; it sold almost 25,000 copies in the US in its first week and 50,000 in its first month. Since its release, the album has sold more than 110,000 copies in the United States and over 400,000 copies worldwide.

The album won the award for "Best Hard Rock Album" at the 2007 Swedish Grammis, over other nominated albums such as The Haunted's The Dead Eye and HammerFall's Threshold.

Come Clarity was named the best Swedish album of the past decade by readers of Swedish newspaper Aftonbladet.

== Track listing ==
All tracks are written by Anders Fridén, Björn Gelotte, and Jesper Strömblad.

No.	Title	Length
1.	"Take This Life"	3:35
2.	"Leeches"	2:55
3.	"Reflect the Storm"	4:16
4.	"Dead End" (feat. Lisa Miskovsky)	3:22
5.	"Scream"	3:12
6.	"Come Clarity"	4:15
7.	"Vacuum"	3:39
8.	"Pacing Death's Trail"	3:00
9.	"Crawl Through Knives"	4:02
10.	"Versus Terminus" (Titled "End of Things" on EU plexi special edition. SE track list from Discogs)	3:18
11.	"Our Infinite Struggle"	3:46
12.	"Vanishing Light"	3:14
13.	"Your Bedtime Story Is Scaring Everyone"	5:25
Total length:		48:06

== Release history ==
Come Clarity was intended for release during summer or early fall 2005, but was delayed.

Alongside the standard version, a special plexiglass box, limited to 1,000 copies, was also released. It features the album split onto two discs and includes a certificate picture on a foil, as well as a DVD. The DVD features the band playing the album in its entirety, except for the final track of the album. However, the audio is not actually live, and is actually a studio recording played over the video. The DVD also features a photo gallery of the recording sessions of Come Clarity.

Region	Date	Format	Catalog	Label
Germany	2006	CD, Album	NB 1309-2	Nuclear Blast
Germany	2006	Limited Box, 3xCD + DVD	NB 1643–2, NB 1644–2, NB 1645–2, NB 1637-5	Nuclear Blast
United States	7 February 2006	CD, Album	F062	Ferret Music
Ukraine	2006	CD, Album	MR 1848-2	Moon Records
Russia	2006	CD, Album	IROND CD 06-1121	Irond
Russia	2006	CD, Album, Dig + DVD	IROND CD 06-1121 DL	Irond
United States	2006	CD, Album, Dig + DVD	F962	Ferret Music
Germany	2006	CD, Album, Dig + DVD-V, Dig	NB 1309–0, NB 1637-5	Nuclear Blast
United States	2006	CD, Album, Promo	F062-2ADV	Ferret Music
Germany	2006	CD, Album, Promo	NB 1613-2	Nuclear Blast
Germany	2006	LP, Album, Cle	NB 1309–1, 27361 13091	Nuclear Blast
Germany	2010	CD, Album, RE	FSR 007	FS Records (2), Tonpool

== Personnel ==
The drums, vocals, keyboards and programming were recorded at Dug Out Studio in Uppsala, and guitars and bass were recorded at The Room in Gothenburg. The album was mixed and mastered at Tonteknik Recording in Umeå, Sweden.

In Flames

- Anders Fridén – vocals
- Björn Gelotte – guitar
- Jesper Strömblad – guitar
- Peter Iwers – bass
- Daniel Svensson – drums

Additional musicians

- Örjan Örnkloo – keyboards and programming
- Uppsala Poker HC Crew – additional vocals on "Scream"
- Lisa Miskovsky – additional vocals on "Dead End"

Production

- Eskil Lövstrom – mixing
- Pelle Henricsson – mixing and mastering
- Magnus Lander – tracking
- Patric Ullaeus – photography
- Derek Hess – artwork

== Charts ==
=== Weekly charts ===
Chart (2006)	Peak position
Austrian Albums (Ö3 Austria)	16
Belgian Albums (Ultratop Flanders)	78
Finnish Albums (Suomen virallinen lista)	1
French Albums (SNEP)	89
German Albums (Offizielle Top 100)	6
Hungarian Albums (MAHASZ)	12
Italian Albums (FIMI)	82
Japanese Albums (Oricon)	17
Norwegian Albums (VG-lista)	27
Scottish Albums (OCC)	57
Spanish Albums (Promusicae)	88
Swedish Albums (Sverigetopplistan)	1
Swiss Albums (Schweizer Hitparade)	30
UK Albums (OCC)	67
US Billboard 200	58
US Top Rock Albums (Billboard)	16

=== Year-end charts ===
Chart (2006)	Position
Swedish Albums (Sverigetopplistan)	66
