= Sounds of a Playground Fading =

Studio album by In Flames
- Released: 15 June 2011 (see release dates)
- Recorded: 11 October 2010 – 25 January 2011
- Studios: IF Studios, Gothenburg, Sweden
- Genre: Alternative metal
- Length: 53:58
- Labels: Century Media, Razzia
- Producers: Roberto Laghi, Anders Fridén

In Flames chronology
| A Sense of Purpose (2008) | Sounds of a Playground Fading (2011) | Siren Charms (2014) |

Singles from Sounds of a Playground Fading
- 1. "Deliver Us" Released: 7 May 2011; 2. "Where the Dead Ships Dwell" Released: 14 November 2011; 3. "Ropes" Released: 5 February 2013

Professional ratings
Aggregate scores
| Source | Rating |
|---|---|
| Metacritic | 68/100 |
Review scores
| Source | Rating |
| AllMusic | 3.5/5 stars |
| Kerrang! | 4/5 stars |
| Metal Hammer | 6/7 stars |
| Metal Storm | 6/10 stars |
| Sputnikmusic | 3/5 stars |
| Earshot.at | 5.5/7 stars |

Sounds of a Playground Fading is the tenth studio album by Swedish heavy metal band In Flames, released on 15 June 2011. It is the first album recorded by In Flames without founding guitarist Jesper Strömblad, who left the band in February 2010, making it also the only In Flames release not to have two guitarists. The album was reissued in 2014, featuring five additional tracks.

== Background ==
According to Anders, this album features increasingly wide vocal registers and reduced growls. In addition, some of the album's songs "pretty much go against the hard rock formula."

The entire album was written by Björn Gelotte. The guitar solos, unlike most other albums, were able to be pre-planned out and worked much better according to the in-studio report.

== Release and promotion ==
The band revealed the cover art, track listing and first single, "Deliver Us", on their official Facebook page in April and May 2011. Then on 3 June 2011, aol.com streamed the entire album on their music network. In Flames performed the album on their European tour with support from Noctiferia, as part of the "Defenders of the Faith III" tour, with bands Trivium, Rise to Remain, Ghost and Insense, and with Trivium in their North American Tour.

Four music videos were filmed including the lead single "Deliver Us" and "Where the Dead Ships Dwell" both released in 2011 while "Ropes" and "Sounds of a Playground Fading" were also filmed but not released until 2013.

The track "Deliver Us" was featured in the soundtrack to the 2013 video game Saints Row IV.

== Reception ==
Sounds of a Playground Fading received generally positive reviews. Review aggregate website Metacritic gave the album a 68 out of 100 based on six professional critics.

== Commercial performance ==
Sounds of a Playground Fading debuted at number 27 on the US Billboard 200 album chart, number 2 on the Top Hard Rock chart, number 7 on the Top Rock chart, and number 5 on the Top Independent chart. It also debuted at number 1 of the Media Control German Albums chart, and at number 12 of the Billboard Canadian Albums chart.

== Track listing ==
All music written by Björn Gelotte and all lyrics by Anders Fridén. All songs arranged by In Flames.

| No. | Title | Length |
|---|---|---|
| 1. | "Sounds of a Playground Fading" | 4:44 |
| 2. | "Deliver Us" | 3:31 |
| 3. | "All for Me" | 4:31 |
| 4. | "The Puzzle" | 4:34 |
| 5. | "Fear Is the Weakness" | 4:07 |
| 6. | "Where the Dead Ships Dwell" | 4:27 |
| 7. | "The Attic" | 3:18 |
| 8. | "Darker Times" | 3:25 |
| 9. | "Ropes" | 3:42 |
| 10. | "Enter Tragedy" | 3:59 |
| 11. | "Jester's Door" | 2:38 |
| 12. | "A New Dawn" | 5:52 |
| 13. | "Liberation" | 5:10 |
| Total length: | | 53:58 |

Japanese edition
| No. | Title | Length |
|---|---|---|
| 14. | "Deliver Us (Instrumental Version)" | 3:31 |
| Total length: | | 57:29 |

iTunes deluxe edition
| No. | Title | Length |
|---|---|---|
| 1. | "Deliver Us" (music video) | 3:31 |
| 14. | "Darker Times (Eagleclaw Remix)" | 5:45 |
| Total length: | | 59:43 |

Deluxe edition DVD
| No. | Title | Length |
|---|---|---|
| 1. | "Recording 'Sounds of a Playground Fading'" (studio report) | 27:28 |

2014 reissue
| No. | Title | Length |
|---|---|---|
| 14. | "Darker Times (Eagleclaw Remix)" | 5:45 |
| 15. | "The Puzzle (Big Chocolate Remix)" | 3:43 |
| 16. | "Where the Dead Ships Dwell (Casper Remix)" | 4:05 |
| 17. | "Where the Dead Ships Dwell (The Qemists Remix)" | 5:12 |
| 18. | "Where the Dead Ships Dwell (Kristof Bathory – Dawn of Ashes Remix)" | 4:46 |
| Total length: | | 77:29 |

== Personnel ==
In Flames

- Anders Fridén – vocals
- Björn Gelotte – guitars
- Peter Iwers – bass
- Daniel Svensson – drums, percussion
- Niclas Engelin – guitars (credit only, he did not perform on the album)

Production

- Anders Björler – filming, editing and directing ("In the Studio"/studio report)
- Johannes Bergion – cello on "A New Dawn"
- Roberto Laghi – producer
- Örjan Örnkloo – keyboards and samples
- Dave Correia – album cover art

== Charts ==
Chart performance for Sounds of a Playground Fading
| Chart (2011) | Peak position |
|---|---|
| Australian Albums (ARIA) | 50 |
| Austrian Albums (Ö3 Austria) | 6 |
| Belgian Albums (Ultratop Flanders) | 73 |
| Belgian Albums (Ultratop Wallonia) | 53 |
| Canadian Albums (Billboard) | 12 |
| Danish Albums (Hitlisten) | 24 |
| Finnish Albums (Suomen virallinen lista) | 4 |
| French Albums (SNEP) | 47 |
| German Albums (Offizielle Top 100) | 1 |
| Italian Albums (FIMI) | 67 |
| Norwegian Albums (VG-lista) | 10 |
| Japanese Albums (Oricon) | 24 |
| Scottish Albums (Official Charts) | 82 |
| Spanish Albums (Promusicae) | 41 |
| Swedish Albums (Sverigetopplistan) | 2 |
| Swiss Albums (Schweizer Hitparade) | 12 |
| UK Albums (Official Charts) | 74 |
| UK Rock & Metal Albums (Official Charts) | 6 |
| US Billboard 200 | 27 |
| US Top Hard Rock Albums (Billboard) | 2 |
| US Independent Albums (Billboard) | 5 |
| US Indie Store Album Sales (Billboard) | 12 |
| US Top Rock Albums (Billboard) | 7 |

== Release dates ==
| Region | Date |
|---|---|
| Sweden | 15 June 2011 |
| Germany, Austria, Switzerland, Norway | 17 June 2011 |
| Europe (excluding Spain, Italy, Finland, Hungary) | 20 June 2011 |
| North America, Spain, Italy | 21 June 2011 |
| Finland, Hungary | 22 June 2011 |
| Australia, New Zealand | 24 June 2011 |
