= Trigger (EP) =

EP by In Flames
- Released: 10 June 2003
- Genres: Melodic death metal, groove metal
- Length: 17:26
- Label: Nuclear Blast
- Producers: Daniel Bergstrand, In Flames

In Flames chronology
Reroute to Remain (2002)	Trigger (2003)	Soundtrack to Your Escape (2004)

Trigger is a song by Swedish heavy metal band In Flames from their 2002 album Reroute to Remain. A standalone version of the song was released as an EP on 10 June 2003, including bonus tracks. The title song was used on the soundtrack for the 2003 film Freddy vs. Jason.

== Track listing ==
No.	Title	Length
1.	"Trigger" (single edit)	4:04
2.	"Watch Them Feed"	3:12
3.	"Land of Confusion" (Genesis cover)	3:22
4.	"Cloud Connected (Club Connected Remix)"	4:11
5.	"Moonshield (C64 Karaoke Version)"	2:36
Total length:		17:26

Enhanced CD
No.	Title	Length
1.	"Trigger" (music video)
2.	"Cloud Connected" (music video)

== Music video ==
The music video for "Trigger" showed the band playing in a club and being constantly pestered and booed by the members of Soilwork, with interspersed footage of other incidents between the two bands. Soilwork's video for "Rejection Role" showed the situation vice versa, Soilwork playing and In Flames as the bullies. The colour is also reversed in each video: blue for In Flames, red for Soilwork. Both videos also had the other band riding in a pickup truck to and from the club. While some believed the tension between the two bands to be real, in reality the groups are close friends and devised the idea of a dual-video concept as a joke.

== Personnel ==
- Anders Fridén – vocals
- Björn Gelotte – guitar
- Jesper Strömblad – guitar
- Peter Iwers – bass
- Daniel Svensson – drums
