= Siren Charms =

Studio album by In Flames
- Released: 9 September 2014
- Recorded: December 2013
- Studio: Hansa Studios, Berlin
- Genre: Alternative metal
- Length: 44:43
- Label: Sony Music
- Producer: Daniel Bergstrand; Roberto Laghi; In Flames

In Flames chronology
Sounds of a Playground Fading (2011)	Siren Charms (2014)	Battles (2016)

Singles from Siren Charms
- 1. "Rusted Nail" Released: 13 June 2014; 2. "Through Oblivion" Released: 2014; 3. "Paralyzed" Released: 2015

Siren Charms is the eleventh studio album by Swedish heavy metal band In Flames. It was released on 5 September 2014 and 9 September in the United States via Sony Music Entertainment. Siren Charms is the first album to feature guitarist Niclas Engelin and the last album to feature long time drummer Daniel Svensson before his departure in 2015.

The eighth track on the disc, "Rusted Nail", was the album's lead single, released on 13 June 2014. Shortly after this release, the band briefly streamed a second track, "Through Oblivion", online. On 9 September 2014, In Flames released an additional music video for the song "Everything's Gone". Finally, a video for "Paralyzed" was released on 15 February 2015.

== Critical reception ==
Professional ratings
Aggregate scores
Source	Rating
Metacritic	52/100
Review scores
Source	Rating
AllMusic	3/5 stars
Blabbermouth.net	7/10
Sputnikmusic	1.5/5 stars
Kerrang!	2/5 stars

Siren Charms received generally mixed reviews from music critics. At Metacritic, which assigns a normalized rating out of 100 to reviews from critics, the album received an average score of 52, which indicates "mixed or average reviews", based on 4 reviews. Gregory Heaney of AllMusic described Siren Charms as "a bit too casual". However he stated it as "a solidly written and executed metal album" and that fans of the band's latest material will likely enjoy it. Kyle Ward of Sputnikmusic however panned the album, describing it as "an unforgivable misstep containing oversights in both songwriting and execution that such a veteran band should be able to spot and correct."

== Track listing ==
All tracks are written by Anders Fridén and Björn Gelotte.

No.	Title	Length
1.	"In Plain View"	4:05
2.	"Everything's Gone"	3:24
3.	"Paralyzed"	4:15
4.	"Through Oblivion"	3:37
5.	"With Eyes Wide Open"	3:58
6.	"Siren Charms"	3:05
7.	"When the World Explodes" (featuring Emilia Feldt)	4:39
8.	"Rusted Nail"	4:55
9.	"Dead Eyes"	5:23
10.	"Monsters in the Ballroom"	3:53
11.	"Filtered Truth"	3:31
Total length:		44:43

iTunes Edition
No.	Title	Length
12.	"The Chase"	4:57

Record Store Day Edition Bonus Track
No.	Title	Length
12.	"The Chase"	4:57
13.	"Become the Sky"	4:01

== Personnel ==
In Flames

- Anders Fridén – vocals
- Björn Gelotte – guitars
- Niclas Engelin – guitars
- Peter Iwers – bass
- Daniel Svensson – drums

Additional musicians

- Örjan Örnkloo – keyboards, programming
- Emilia Feldt – backing vocals on "When the World Explodes"
- The Head Jester Choir – choir on "Rusted Nail"
- Martin Rubashov – backing vocals on "Dead Eyes"

Other personnel

- Erik Jaime – art direction
- Andreas Werling – art direction, design, management
- Blake Armstrong – artwork, illustration
- In Flames – co-production
- Arnold Lindberg – additional drum editing
- Roberto Laghi – engineering, production
- Daniel Bergstrand – engineering, production, backing vocals
- Jez Hale – management
- Tom Coyne – mastering
- Michael Ilbert – mixing

== Charts ==
Chart (2014)	Peak position
Australian Albums (ARIA)	33
Austrian Albums (Ö3 Austria)	7
Belgian Albums (Ultratop Flanders)	62
Belgian Albums (Ultratop Wallonia)	68
Canadian Albums (Billboard)	12
Danish Albums (Hitlisten)	28
Finnish Albums (Suomen virallinen lista)	1
French Albums (SNEP)	87
German Albums (Offizielle Top 100)	7
Italian Albums (FIMI)	89
Japanese Albums (Oricon)	23
Norwegian Albums (VG-lista)	6
Scottish Albums (OCC)	38
Spanish Albums (Promusicae)	60
Swedish Albums (Sverigetopplistan)	1
Swiss Albums (Schweizer Hitparade)	9
UK Albums (OCC)	52
UK Rock & Metal Albums (OCC)	4
US Billboard 200	26
US Independent Albums (Billboard)	6
US Top Hard Rock Albums (Billboard)	1
US Top Rock Albums (Billboard)	6
