= Soundtrack to Your Escape =

Studio album by In Flames
- Released: 29 March 2004
- Recorded: September–November 2003
- Studios: Dugout Studio, Uppsala, Sweden (drums), Denmark (vocals & guitars)
- Genres: Melodic death metal; alternative metal
- Length: 47:02
- Label: Nuclear Blast
- Producer: Daniel Bergstrand

In Flames chronology
Reroute to Remain (2002)	Soundtrack to Your Escape (2004)	Come Clarity (2006)

Singles from Soundtrack to Your Escape
- 1. "The Quiet Place" Released: 1 March 2004

Professional ratings
Review scores
Source	Rating
AllMusic	4/5 stars
LambGoat	5/10 stars
Metal.de	8/10 stars
Metal Underground	1.5/5 stars

Soundtrack to Your Escape is the seventh studio album by Swedish heavy metal band In Flames, released on 29 March 2004.

The album was criticized by longtime fans because of a major change in musical style. However, the album was seen by many as a natural progression from Reroute to Remain and was critically praised by critics such as Metal Hammer and Kerrang!. It reached number 3 in Sweden, number 45 on the American Billboard 200 chart (the band's first album to reach the Billboard 200), number 2 on the Top Heatseekers chart, and number 7 on the Independent Albums chart. This would mark the first album where the band would exclusively use drop A# tuning and abandoning the C standard tuning of previous albums.

== Releases ==
The album is available in both a regular jewel case version featuring 12 tracks and a limited edition digipak with a bonus track, "Discover Me Like Emptiness". The Japanese version has an additional live track called "Clayman".

A special edition, which includes a bonus DVD with live footage and videos of the singles "The Quiet Place" and "Touch of Red", was also released. Music videos were produced for the songs "My Sweet Shadow", "Like You Better Dead", "Borders and Shading" and "F(r)iend".

== Track listing ==
All tracks are written by Anders Fridén, Björn Gelotte, and Jesper Strömblad.

No.	Title	Length
1.	"F(r)iend"	3:27
2.	"The Quiet Place"	3:45
3.	"Dead Alone"	3:43
4.	"Touch of Red"	4:13
5.	"Like You Better Dead"	3:23
6.	"My Sweet Shadow"	4:39
7.	"Evil in a Closet"	4:02
8.	"In Search for I"	3:23
9.	"Borders and Shading"	4:22
10.	"Superhero of the Computer Rage"	4:01
11.	"Dial 595-Escape"	3:48
12.	"Bottled"	4:18/3:06
Total length:		47:02

Limited edition
No.	Title	Length
13.	"Discover Me Like Emptiness"	4:17

Deluxe edition; some bonus tracks from Trigger
No.	Title	Length
13.	"Watch Them Feed"	3:11
14.	"Land of Confusion" (Genesis cover)	3:22

2010 re-release
No.	Title	Length
13.	"Discover Me Like Emptiness"	4:20
14.	"The Quiet Place" (Live at Hammersmith)	3:35
15.	"My Sweet Shadow" (Remix)	4:36

Korean edition
No.	Title	Length
13.	"Discover Me Like Emptiness"	4:17
14.	"Clayman" (Live at Wacken Open Air 2003)	4:02

Bonus DVD
No.	Title	Length
1.	"The Quiet Place" (Music video)
2.	"Touch of Red" (Music video)
3.	"Watch Them Feed" (Live at Wacken Open Air 2003)
4.	"Only for the Weak" (Live at Wacken Open Air 2003)
5.	"The Making of"

Bonus DVD (Korea)
No.	Title	Length
1.	"System" (Live from Seoul, South Korea)
2.	"Pinball Map" (Live from Seoul, South Korea)
3.	"Episode 666" (Live from Seoul, South Korea)

== Personnel ==
In Flames

- Anders Fridén – vocals
- Björn Gelotte – guitar
- Jesper Strömblad – guitar
- Peter Iwers – bass
- Daniel Svensson – drums

Additional personnel

- Niklas Sundin – album cover
- Daniel Bergstrand – audio engineer, audio production, engineer, mixing, producer
- Björn Engelmann – mastering
- Örjan Örnkloo – keyboards, programming, engineering, mixing, sampling

== Charts ==
Charts (2004)	Peak position
Austrian Albums (Ö3 Austria)	25
Finnish Albums (Suomen virallinen lista)	13
French Albums (SNEP)	82
German Albums (Offizielle Top 100)	28
Hungarian Albums (MAHASZ)	32
Norwegian Albums (VG-lista)	36
Swedish Albums (Sverigetopplistan)	3
UK Albums (OCC)	145
US Billboard 200	58
US Heatseekers Albums (Billboard)	2
US Independent Albums (Billboard)	7
