= Clayman =

Studio album by In Flames
- Released: 3 July 2000
- Recorded: 31 January–? 2000
- Studio: Studio Fredman, Gothenburg
- Genre: Melodic death metal
- Length: 43:44
- Label: Nuclear Blast
- Producer: Fredrik Nordström; In Flames; Howard Benson (20th Anniversary Edition)

In Flames chronology
| Colony (1999) | Clayman (2000) | Reroute to Remain (2002) |

Clayman is the fifth studio album by Swedish heavy metal band In Flames, released via Nuclear Blast on 3 July 2000.

== Music and lyrics ==
Clayman is the final In Flames album to feature their original melodic death metal sound. According to Andy O'Connor of Spin: "Clayman represents a sweet spot between their deathier, more complicated beginnings and their commercial aspirations."

The album's lyrics explore themes such as depression and internal struggles. The band tuned their guitars to drop A# on the songs Pinball Map and ...As the Future Repeats Today.

== Artwork ==
The album's cover art is based on Leonardo da Vinci's Vitruvian Man drawing. The Jester Head appears in the background, both on the cover, and in the album booklet itself. Music videos were produced for the songs "Pinball Map" (directed by Tamara Jordan) and "Only for the Weak".

== Reception and legacy ==
Professional ratings
Review scores
| Source | Rating |
|---|---|
| AllMusic | 4/5 stars |
| Rock Hard | 9.5/10 |

Matt Kantor of AllMusic gave the album four stars out of five and said: "With some of their best writing yet, they continue to tighten up a sound that could please fans of everyone from Queensrÿche to Arch Enemy to maybe even Satyricon. With their blend of speed, melody, and pensive aggression, In Flames is indeed hard to pin down. Clayman at its core, though, is invigorating, well-executed metal that, dare it be said, is a fun listen; this probably isn't far from what the band intends."

In 2005, Clayman was ranked No. 448 in Rock Hard magazine's book "The 500 Greatest Rock & Metal Albums of All Time". In 2020, it was named one of the 20 best metal albums of 2000 by Metal Hammer magazine. In 2020, "Bullet Ride", "Pinball Map", "Only for the Weak", and the title track were re-recorded for a 20th-anniversary edition of the album. Fan responses to the re-recordings have been mixed.

== Track listing ==
All lyrics are written by Anders Fridén; all music is composed by Jesper Strömblad and Björn Gelotte.

| No. | Title | Length |
|---|---|---|
| 1. | "Bullet Ride" | 4:42 |
| 2. | "Pinball Map" | 4:08 |
| 3. | "Only for the Weak" | 4:55 |
| 4. | "...As the Future Repeats Today" | 3:27 |
| 5. | "Square Nothing" | 3:57 |
| 6. | "Clayman" | 3:28 |
| 7. | "Satellites and Astronauts" | 5:00 |
| 8. | "Brush the Dust Away" | 3:17 |
| 9. | "Swim" | 3:14 |
| 10. | "Suburban Me" (featuring Christopher Amott) | 3:35 |
| 11. | "Another Day in Quicksand" | 3:56 |
| Total length: | | 43:44 |

2005 Deluxe edition and 2008 Reloaded edition
| No. | Title | Length |
|---|---|---|
| 12. | "Strong and Smart" (No Fun at All cover, also in 2000 Japanese edition) | 2:22 |
| 13. | "World of Promises" (Treat cover) | 3:49 |
| Total length: | | 49:55 |

2010 re-release
| No. | Title | Length |
|---|---|---|
| 12. | "Only for the Weak" (Live version) | 4:51 |
| 13. | "Pinball Map" (Live version) | 4:30 |
| 14. | "Strong and Smart" (No Fun at All cover) | 2:22 |
| Total length: | | 55:27 |

Apart from remastered versions of the original songs, the 20th Anniversary Edition features the following tracks:

2020 20th Anniversary Edition
| No. | Title | Length |
|---|---|---|
| 12. | "Themes and Variations in D-Minor" (instrumental) | 5:10 |
| 13. | "Only for the Weak" (Re-recorded) | 4:13 |
| 14. | "Bullet Ride" (Re-recorded) | 4:37 |
| 15. | "Pinball Map" (Re-recorded) | 4:19 |
| 16. | "Clayman" (Re-recorded) | 3:37 |
| Total length: | | 21:56 |

== Personnel ==
=== In Flames ===
- Anders Fridén – vocals
- Björn Gelotte – guitar
- Jesper Strömblad – guitar
- Peter Iwers – bass
- Daniel Svensson – drums

=== Additional personnel ===
- Charlie Storm – programming, synthesizer
- Christopher Amott (Arch Enemy) – guitar solo on "Suburban Me"
- Fredrik Nordström – additional programming, synthesizer, recording, production
- In Flames – recording, production
- Axel Hermann – artwork, layout
- Tobias Lundgren – photography

== Charts ==
Chart performance for Clayman
| Chart (2020) | Peak position |
|---|---|
| Austrian Albums (Ö3 Austria) | 48 |
| German Albums (Offizielle Top 100) | 16 |
| Scottish Albums (OCC) | 69 |
| Swiss Albums (Schweizer Hitparade) | 26 |
