= Anders Fridén =

Swedish singer (born 1973)

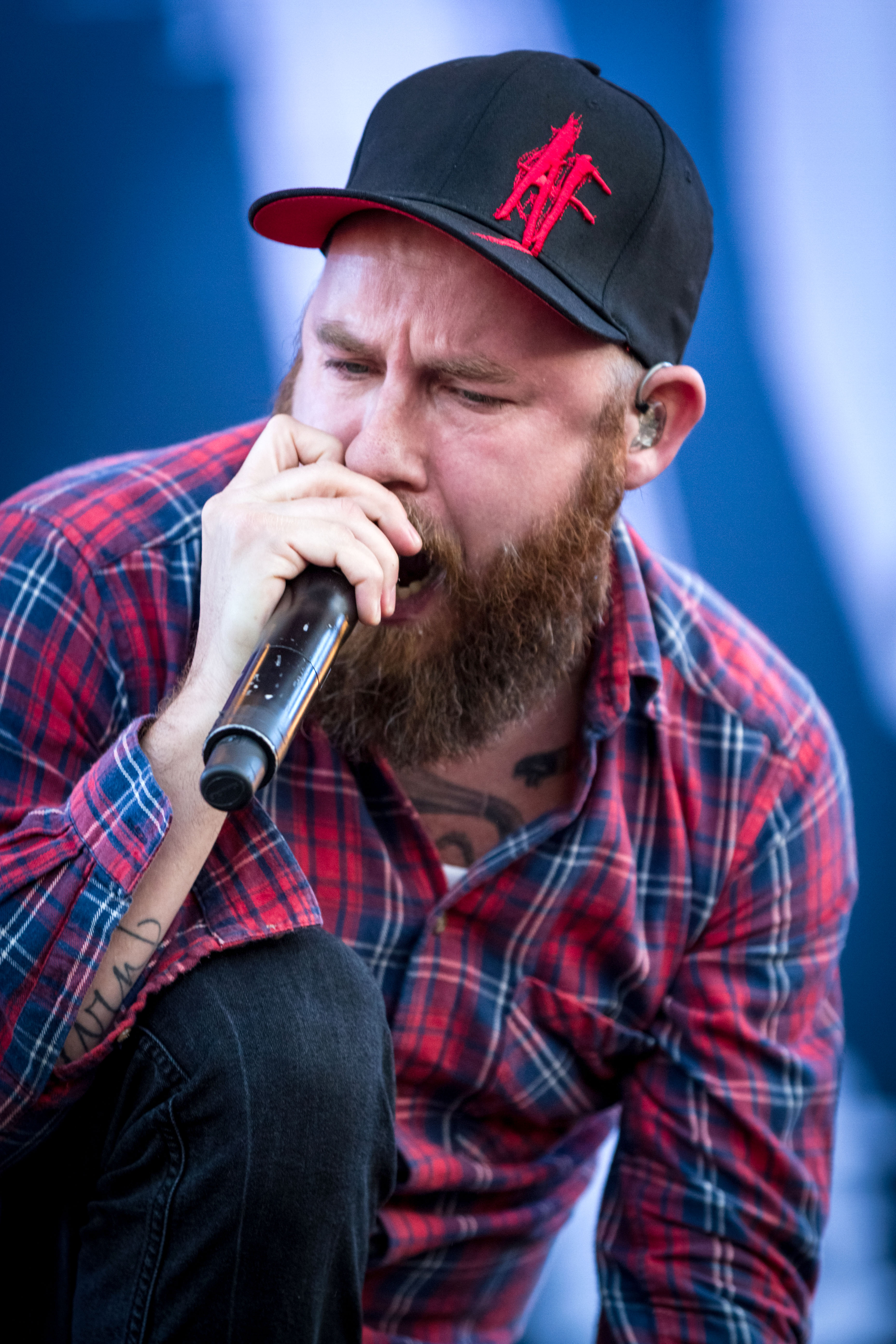
- Fridén with In Flames in 2015

Background information
- Born: Pär Anders Fridén; 25 March 1973 (age 53); Gothenburg, Sweden
- Genres: Melodic death metal; alternative metal
- Occupations: Singer; songwriter; record producer
- Years active: 1989–present
- Member of: In Flames; If Anything, Suspicious
- Formerly of: Passenger; Dark Tranquillity; Ceremonial Oath
- Website: inflames.com

Pär Anders Fridén (born 25 March 1973) is a Swedish vocalist, best known as the lead singer of the heavy metal band In Flames. He was also the vocalist of Dark Tranquillity and side project Passenger.

== Career ==
=== Early career ===
Fridén was originally the vocalist for Dark Tranquillity. He performed on their debut album, Skydancer, but left the band soon after. Two years later he joined In Flames. Coincidentally Mikael Stanne had left In Flames (being only a session player) and switched from rhythm guitar to lead vocals in Dark Tranquillity, so the two effectively traded places. Fridén was also the lead vocalist for another band known as Ceremonial Oath with In Flames founder Jesper Strömblad.

=== 1995–present: In Flames ===
Fridén started with In Flames on the 1996 album The Jester Race. On the album Whoracle, Niklas Sundin wrote the lyrics following the original synopsis by Fridén. On the 1999 album Colony, Fridén composed the lyrics himself, though Sundin still assisted by translating his lyrics from Swedish to English.

He is also the vocalist for the band Passenger as a side project.

Fridén also has done guest vocals on the album The Phantom Novels, by the metal band Grievance. He is the lead vocalist on the tracks Atrocity Upon Deceptions, A Devil's Rhyme and The Mask of Sin.

In 2007 Fridén appeared as a guest vocalist on the Japanese bonus track "See the Falling Sky" on Caliban's 2007 album "The Awakening". As well as providing vocals for the track "Dysfunctional Hours" for the 20th anniversary Nuclear Blast Allstars compilation album, Out of the Dark.

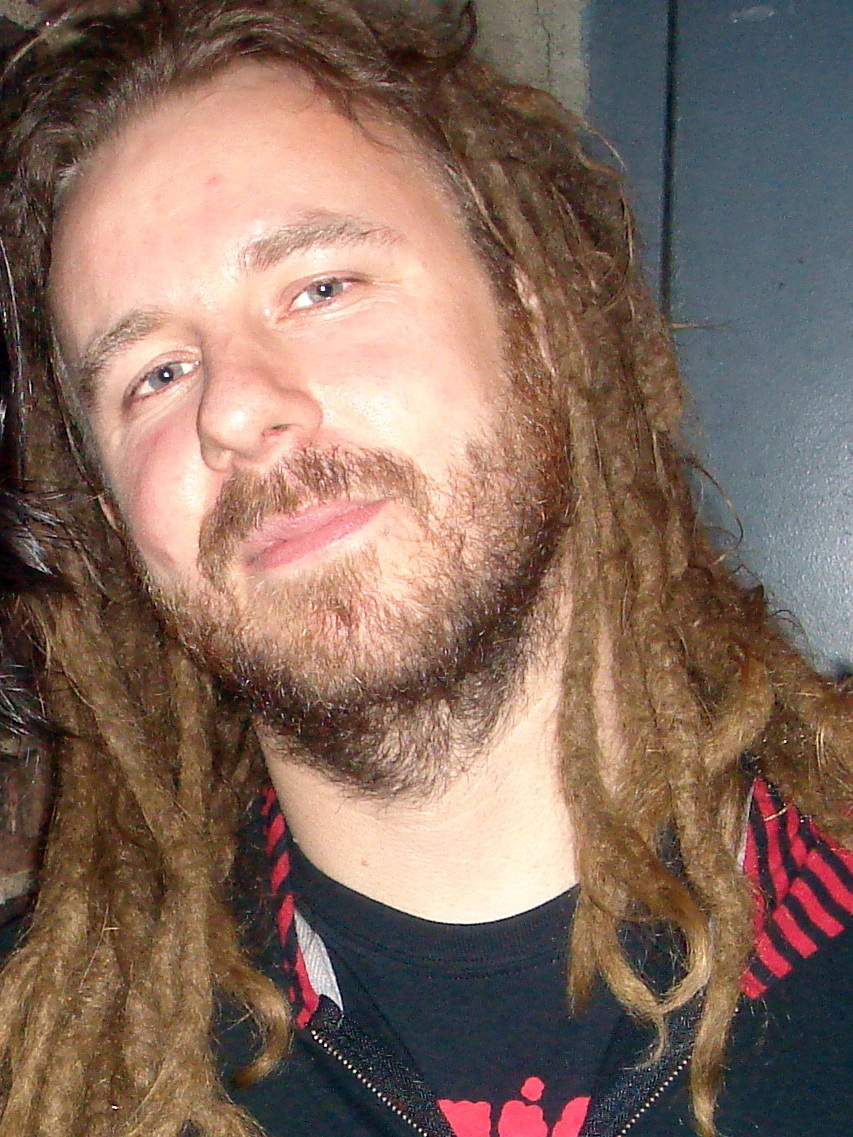
Fridén in 2008

His look changed dramatically following the release of In Flames 2002 release Reroute to Remain. His previously clean-shaven look was replaced with a beard, and his long hair was put into dreadlocks. His vocal style has also changed, especially on the past three records. His low-tone, harsh death growl has evolved into a higher pitched scream, which is now supplemented by clean vocals and layers of backing vocals.

In addition to being a vocalist, Fridén is also a producer, with his most recent efforts being the albums: The Undying Darkness by Caliban in 2006 and Absolute Design by the band Engel in 2007.

He also co-wrote and performed scream vocals on the song "Self vs Self", which appears on the third album of UK/Australian drum and bass band Pendulum alongside his bandmates Björn Gelotte and Peter Iwers.

In the summer of 2010, Fridén changed his appearance again by cutting off his dreadlocks, which he had grown since the release of Reroute to Remain.

Fridén founded the ambient/electronic project If Anything, Suspicious in 2021. The project's debut album, Lullabies for the Damned, was released in collaboration with OFFAIR in December 2021.

== Discography ==
Album or song	Band	Membership	Role	Year
Enfeebled Earth	Septic Broiler	Ex-member	Vocals	1990
Rehearsal December 1990	Septic Broiler	Ex-member	Vocals	1990
Trail of Life Decayed	Dark Tranquillity	Ex-member	Vocals	1991
A Moonclad Reflection	Dark Tranquillity	Ex-member	Vocals	1992
Skydancer	Dark Tranquillity	Ex-member	Vocals	1993
Subterranean	In Flames	Guest	Vocals on "Murders in the Rue Morgue"	1994
Carpet (1–3, 7)	Ceremonial Oath	Ex-member	Vocals	1995
The Jester Race	In Flames	Member	Vocals	1995
Black-Ash Inheritance	In Flames	Member	Vocals	1997
Whoracle	In Flames	Member	Vocals	1997
Penetrations from the Lost World	Dimension Zero	Guest	Co-producing	1997
The Fifth Season	Sacrilege	Guest	Engineering	1997
"Hedon" – The Mind's I	Dark Tranquillity	Guest	Co-vocals/mantra	1997
"Hands of the Puppeteers" – Visionnaire	Misanthrope	Guest	Backing vocals	1997
Haddock	Haddock	Guest	Recording	1998
My Arms, Your Hearse	Opeth	Guest	Co-producing	1998
Amorous Anathema	Embraced	Guest	Producing, mixing	1998
The Nude Ballet	Withering Surface	Guest	Mastering	1998
Colony	In Flames	Member	Vocals	1999
The Phantom Novels (2, 3)	Grievance	Guest	Co-vocals	1999
"AntiChrist 3000" – The Beast Divine	Cemetery 1213	Guest	Co-vocals	2000
Clayman	In Flames	Member	Vocals	2000
Not Dead Yet	Raise Hell	Guest	Co-producing	2000
Haven	Dark Tranquillity	Guest	Engineering	2000
The Tokyo Showdown	In Flames	Member	Vocals	2001
I Die, You Soar	Madrigal	Guest	Producing, recording	2001
Reroute to Remain	In Flames	Member	Vocals, mixing, engineering	2002
Silent Night Fever	Dimension Zero	Guest	Co-producing	2002
Trigger	In Flames	Member	Vocals	2003
Passenger	Passenger	Member	Vocals	2003
This Is Hell	Dimension Zero	Guest	Co-producing	2003
Synthetic Generation	Deathstars	Guest	Engineering, recording	2003
Prey on Life	Burst	Guest	Producing, engineering	2003
Soundtrack to Your Escape	In Flames	Member	Vocals	2004
The Opposite from Within	Caliban	Guest	Producing	2004
Used & Abused: In Live We Trust	In Flames	Member	Vocals	2005
Come Clarity	In Flames	Member	Vocals	2006
The Undying Darkness	Caliban	Guest	Producing	2006
"I See The Falling Sky" – The Awakening	Caliban	Guest	Co-vocals	2007
Absolute Design	Engel	Guest	Producing	2007
"Dysfunctional Hours" – Out of the Dark	Nuclear Blast All-Stars	Guest	Vocals	2007
Subversive Blueprint	The Destiny Program	Guest	Producing	2007
A Sense of Purpose	In Flames	Member	Vocals	2008
"Self vs Self" – Immersion	Pendulum	Guest	Co-vocals	2010
Sounds of a Playground Fading	In Flames	Member	Vocals	2011
Siren Charms	In Flames	Member	Vocals	2014
Battles	In Flames	Member	Vocals	2016
"Irreversible" – The Great Electronic Swindle	The Bloody Beetroots	Guest	Vocals	2017
"Raise Your Banner" – Resist	Within Temptation	Guest	Vocals	2018
I, the Mask	In Flames	Member	Vocals	2019
"Scars That I'm Hiding" – Panic	From Ashes to New	Guest	Background vocals	2021
Foregone	In Flames	Member	Vocals	2023
"The Golden Trail" – The Call of the Void	Nita Strauss	Guest	Vocals	2023
"Cannibal" – Friend of a Phantom	Vola	Guest	Vocals	2024
