= Daniel Svensson =

Swedish drummer (born 1977)

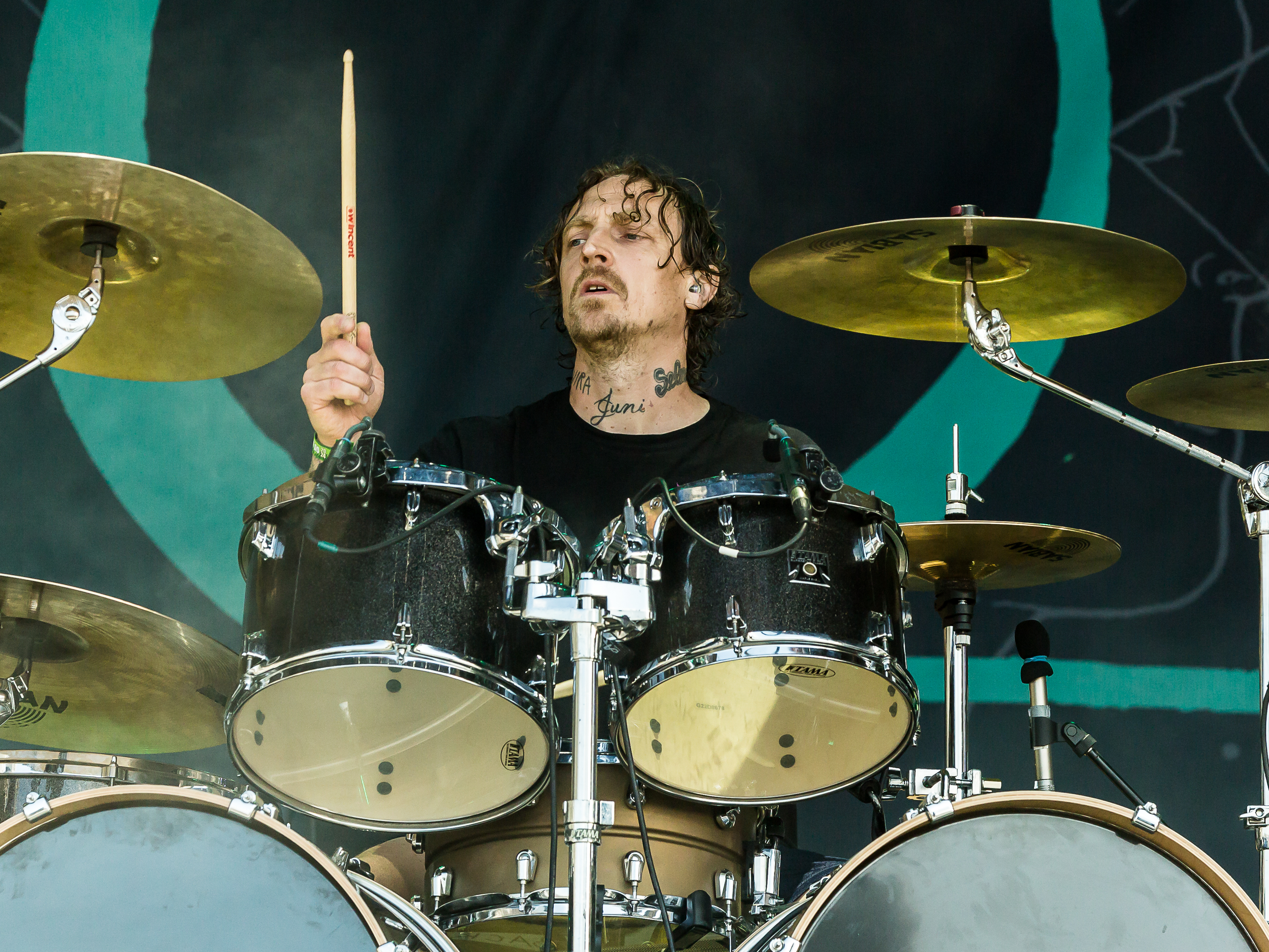
- Svensson in 2024

Background information
- Born: 20 November 1977 (age 48)
- Origin: Gothenburg, Sweden
- Genre: Melodic death metal
- Occupation: Musician
- Instruments: Drums; vocals (Sacrilege GBG)
- Years active: 1995–2016; 2021–present
- Website: dsvensson.com

Daniel Svensson (born 20 November 1977) is a Swedish drummer. He is currently a member of the Swedish supergroup The Halo Effect (2021–) and formerly a drummer of the metal bands In Flames, Sacrilege GBG (also the vocalist) and Diabolique.

Svensson is a self taught drummer. He would adopt drum beats from songs after listening to a walkman and eventually start jamming on a drum set that was originally owned by his younger brother. His biggest drumming influence is Vinnie Paul of Pantera. In 1998, Svensson took Björn Gelotte's job occupation as drummer when Gelotte switched from drums to guitars. In Flames' first album with him as drummer along with Peter Iwers was Colony, and it was released the following year. He rejoined Sacrilege GBG in 2006. Svensson decided to leave In Flames after finishing up the Europe tour in November 2015. He is also running a beer brewing company together with former In Flames bandmate Peter Iwers. They have their own beer brewery outside Gothenburg called Odd Island Brewing.

== Equipment ==
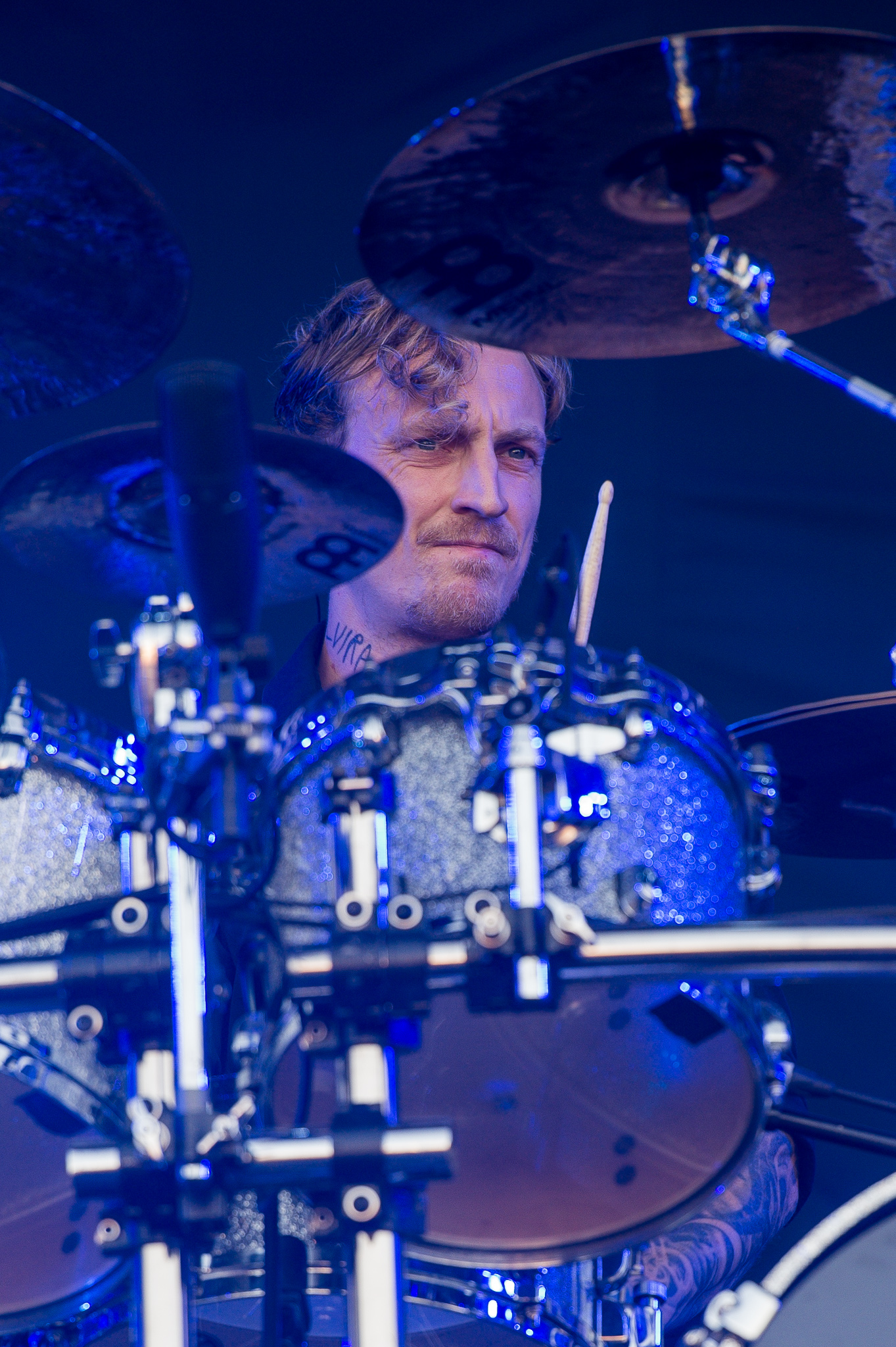
Svensson with In Flames in 2015

- Drums – Tama Starclassic Maple/Bubinga, Piano White
  - Pro-Mark Millennium II 5A Daniel Svensson signature sticks

== Discography ==
Band	Year of release	Title	Label
Sacrilege	1995	To Where Light Can't Reach	demotape
Sacrilege	1996	Lost in the Beauty You Slay	Black Sun Records
Sacrilege	1996	...And Autumn Failed	demotape
Sacrilege	1997	The Fifth Season	Black Sun Records
In Flames	1999	Colony	Nuclear Blast
In Flames	2000	Clayman	Nuclear Blast
In Flames	2001	The Tokyo Showdown	Nuclear Blast
In Flames	2002	Reroute To Remain	Nuclear Blast
In Flames	2003	Trigger	Nuclear Blast
In Flames	2004	Soundtrack To Your Escape	Nuclear Blast
In Flames	2006	Come Clarity	Nuclear Blast
In Flames	2008	A Sense of Purpose	Nuclear Blast
In Flames	2011	Sounds of a Playground Fading	Century Media
Sacrilege GBG	TBA	A Matter of Dark	
In Flames	2014	Siren Charms	Sony Music
The Halo Effect	2022	Days of the Lost	Nuclear Blast
The Halo Effect	2025	March of the Unheard	Nuclear Blast
