= Reroute to Remain =

Studio album by In Flames
- Released: 3 September 2002
- Recorded: 2002
- Genres: Melodic death metal; alternative metal
- Length: 51:39
- Label: Nuclear Blast
- Producer: Daniel Bergstrand

In Flames chronology
Clayman (2000)	Reroute to Remain (2002)	Soundtrack to Your Escape (2004)

Singles from Reroute to Remain
- 1. "Cloud Connected" Released: 4 November 2002; 2. "Trigger" Released: 10 June 2003 (EP)

Music video
- "Cloud Connected" on YouTube

Professional ratings
Review scores
Source	Rating
AllMusic	4.5/5 stars
Rock Hard	9/10
Ultimate Guitar	9/10 stars

Reroute to Remain (subtitled: Fourteen Songs of Conscious Insanity, and on reissue: Fourteen Songs of Conscious Madness) is the sixth studio album by Swedish heavy metal band In Flames, released in September 2002.

The album saw a major change in musical style and was met with rejection among many of the band's fanbase. The album's more accessible sound attracted many new fans and popularized In Flames' name within the American heavy metal scene, helping to secure a top spot at Ozzfest. It was the band's first album to present singles: "Trigger" and "Cloud Connected". The band would continue to use guitars tuned to Drop A# on this album with some songs tuned to C standard, with the exception of "Transparent", which was tuned down to Drop G.

== Reception ==
=== Critical reception ===
Despite initially receiving a mixed response from fans, the album received mostly favorable reviews. In 2005, Reroute to Remain was ranked number 326 in Rock Hard magazine's book The 500 Greatest Rock & Metal Albums of All Time.

=== Charts ===
The album peaked at No. 13 on the Billboard Independent Albums chart.

== Track listing ==
All music is composed by Björn Gelotte, Jesper Strömblad and Anders Fridén. All lyrics are written by Anders Fridén, except where noted.

No.	Title	Lyrics	Length
1.	"Reroute to Remain"	Fridén, Helena Lindsjö	3:53
2.	"System"		3:39
3.	"Drifter"		3:10
4.	"Trigger"		4:58
5.	"Cloud Connected"		3:40
6.	"Transparent"		4:03
7.	"Dawn of a New Day"		3:40
8.	"Egonomic"		2:36
9.	"Minus"		3:45
10.	"Dismiss the Cynics"	Fridén, Lindsjö	3:38
11.	"Free Fall"		3:58
12.	"Dark Signs"		3:20
13.	"Metaphor"		3:39
14.	"Black & White"		3:33
Total length:			51:39

Japanese & Korean reissue
No.	Title	Album	Length
15.	"Colony (Live)"	Colony	5:11
Total length:			56:50

2010 re-release
No.	Title	Length
15.	"Watch Them Feed"	3:12
16.	"Land of Confusion" (Genesis cover)	3:22
17.	"Cloud Connected (Club Connected Remix)"	4:11
Total length:		62:24

== Credits ==
=== In Flames ===
- Anders Fridén – vocals
- Björn Gelotte – guitar
- Jesper Strömblad – guitar
- Peter Iwers – bass
- Daniel Svensson – drums

=== Other personnel ===
- Jesper Strömblad – music (1–15, 17)
- Björn Gelotte – music (1–15, 17)
- Anders Fridén – lyrics (tracks 1–15, 17), co-mixing
- Helena Lindsjö – co-lyrics (1 and 10)
- Örjan Örnkloo – keyboards, programming, mixing
- Teddy Möller – drum tech
- Daniel Bergstrand – mixing
- Niklas Sundin (Cabin Fever Media) – art direction, design, photography, translation on "Colony"
- Cymbal-Simon – cymbals
- Takehiko Maeda – Japanese liner notes

=== Featured artists on "Metaphor" ===
- Maria Gauffin – backing vocals
- Fiol-Olof – violin

=== Writers of "Land of Confusion" ===
- Phil Collins
- Tony Banks
- Mike Rutherford

== Charts ==
Chart (2002)	Peak position
Austrian Albums (Ö3 Austria)	67
Finnish Albums (Suomen virallinen lista)	5
French Albums (SNEP)	81
German Albums (Offizielle Top 100)	23
Swedish Albums (Sverigetopplistan)	5
US Heatseekers Albums (Billboard)	10
US Independent Albums (Billboard)	13
