= In Flames =

Swedish heavy metal band

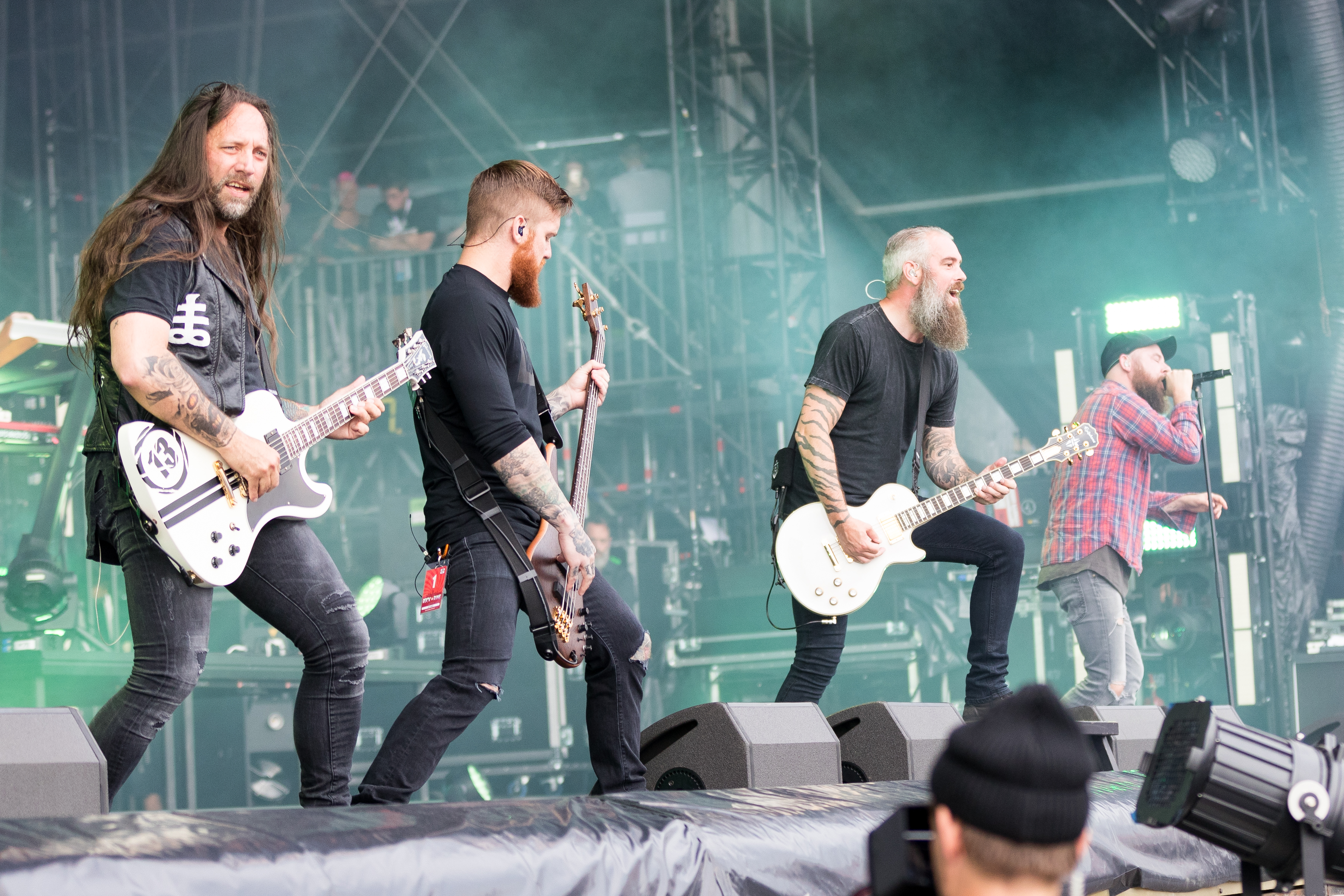
- In Flames at Rock am Ring 2017; from left to right: Niclas Engelin, Bryce Paul, Björn Gelotte and Anders Fridén

Background information
- Origin: Gothenburg, Sweden
- Genres: Melodic death metal; alternative metal
- Years active: 1990–present
- Labels: Nuclear Blast; Ferret; Wrong Again; Koch; Good Fight; Century Media; Epic; SME; Roadrunner; Fearless; Eleven Seven
- Members: Björn Gelotte; Anders Fridén; Chris Broderick; Liam Wilson; Jon Rice
- Past members: Anders Iwers; Karl Näslund; Mikael Stanne; Daniel Erlandsson; Johan Larsson; Glenn Ljungström; Jesper Strömblad; Daniel Svensson; Peter Iwers; Joe Rickard; Niclas Engelin; Bryce Paul; Tanner Wayne
- Website: www.inflames.com

In Flames is a Swedish heavy metal band from Gothenburg, formed in 1990. They are considered pioneers of the Gothenburg metal scene, which also includes bands such as At the Gates and Dark Tranquillity. Their lineup has changed several times. Lead guitarist Björn Gelotte and lead vocalist Anders Fridén are the only consistent members since 1995. Since the departure of founder Jesper Strömblad in 2010, no original members remain with the band. The band has sold over two million records worldwide.

During the band's early years, In Flames had a varying group of recording musicians, including many session musicians. By the release of Colony (1999), the group had a stable lineup. Their sixth studio album, Reroute to Remain (2002), moved toward a newer style further away from melodic death metal and closer to alternative metal. Fans of the group's heavier sound criticized this shift; however, it increased the band's mainstream audience and bolstered album sales.

Since the band's inception, In Flames have released fourteen studio albums, three EPs, and two live DVDs. Their latest release was their fourteenth studio album, Foregone, in 2023. In Flames has been nominated for ten Swedish Grammis Awards winning seven of them, including "Hard Rock/Metal Album of the Year" category in 2005 for Soundtrack to Your Escape, 2007 for Come Clarity, 2009 for A Sense of Purpose, and most recently in 2024 for Foregone.

== History ==
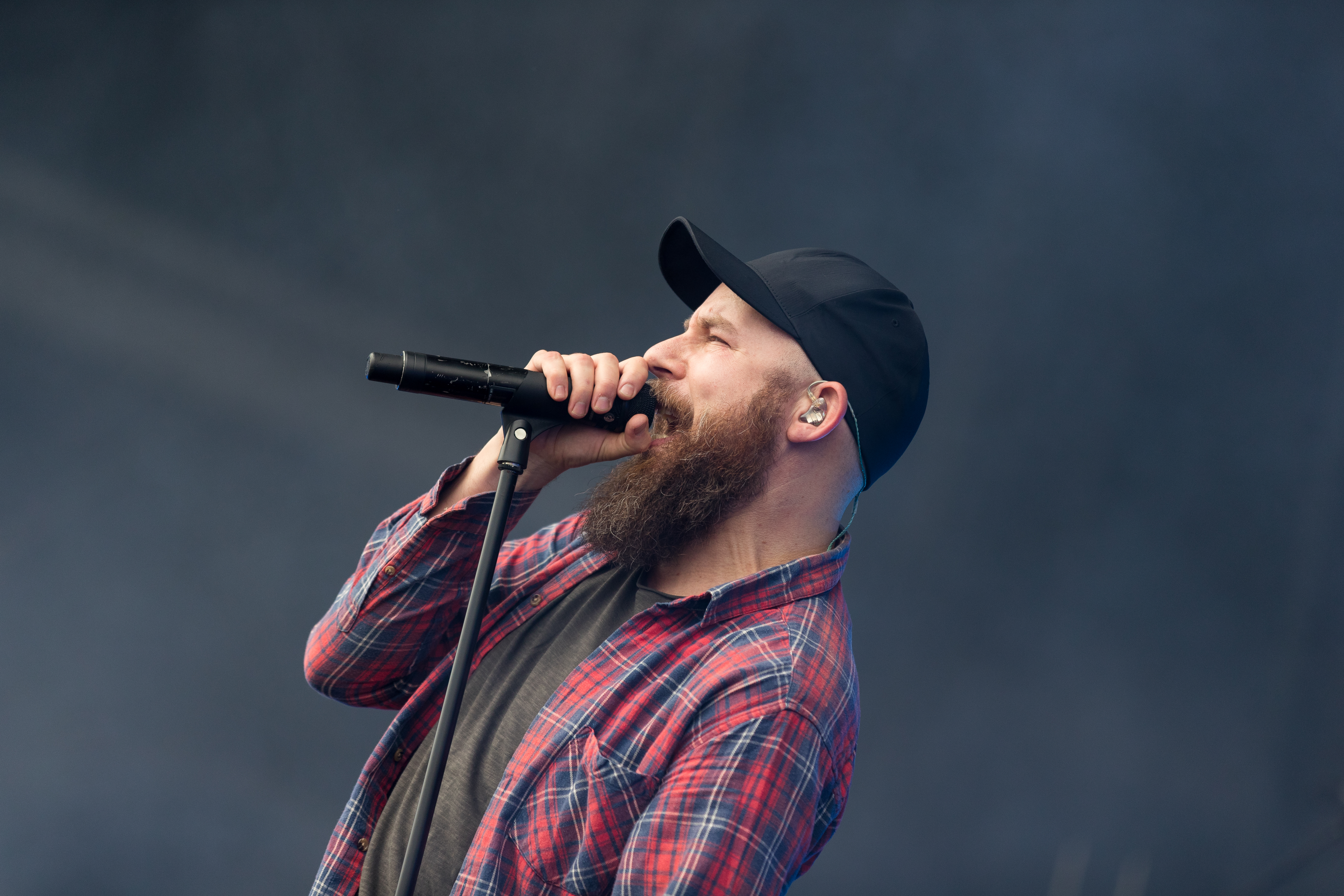
Singer Anders Fridén at Rock am Ring 2017

=== Formation and Lunar Strain (1990–1995) ===
Drummer Jesper Strömblad founded In Flames in 1990 as a side project from his then-current death metal band, Ceremonial Oath, in which he was the bassist. He intended to write more melodic songs, which Ceremonial Oath did not allow him to. In 1993, Strömblad quit Ceremonial Oath due to musical differences and focused on In Flames. That same year, Strömblad recruited guitarist Glenn Ljungström and bassist Johan Larsson to form the first official In Flames line-up.

The trio recorded a demo in August 1993 and sent it to Wrong Again Records. To increase their chances of being signed, the group said they had recorded thirteen songs when they only had three. The owner of the label enjoyed the music and signed them.

After signing, the band began working on their debut album, Lunar Strain, recorded in Studio Fredman and released in August 1994. Since the band did not have a singer, Strömblad asked Mikael Stanne of Dark Tranquillity to provide session vocals. Many session musicians participated in the recording, including guitarists Anders Iwers, Karl Näslund, and Oscar Dronjak (the latter of which provided backing vocals), vocalist Jennica Johansson, and violinist Ylva Wåhlstedt.

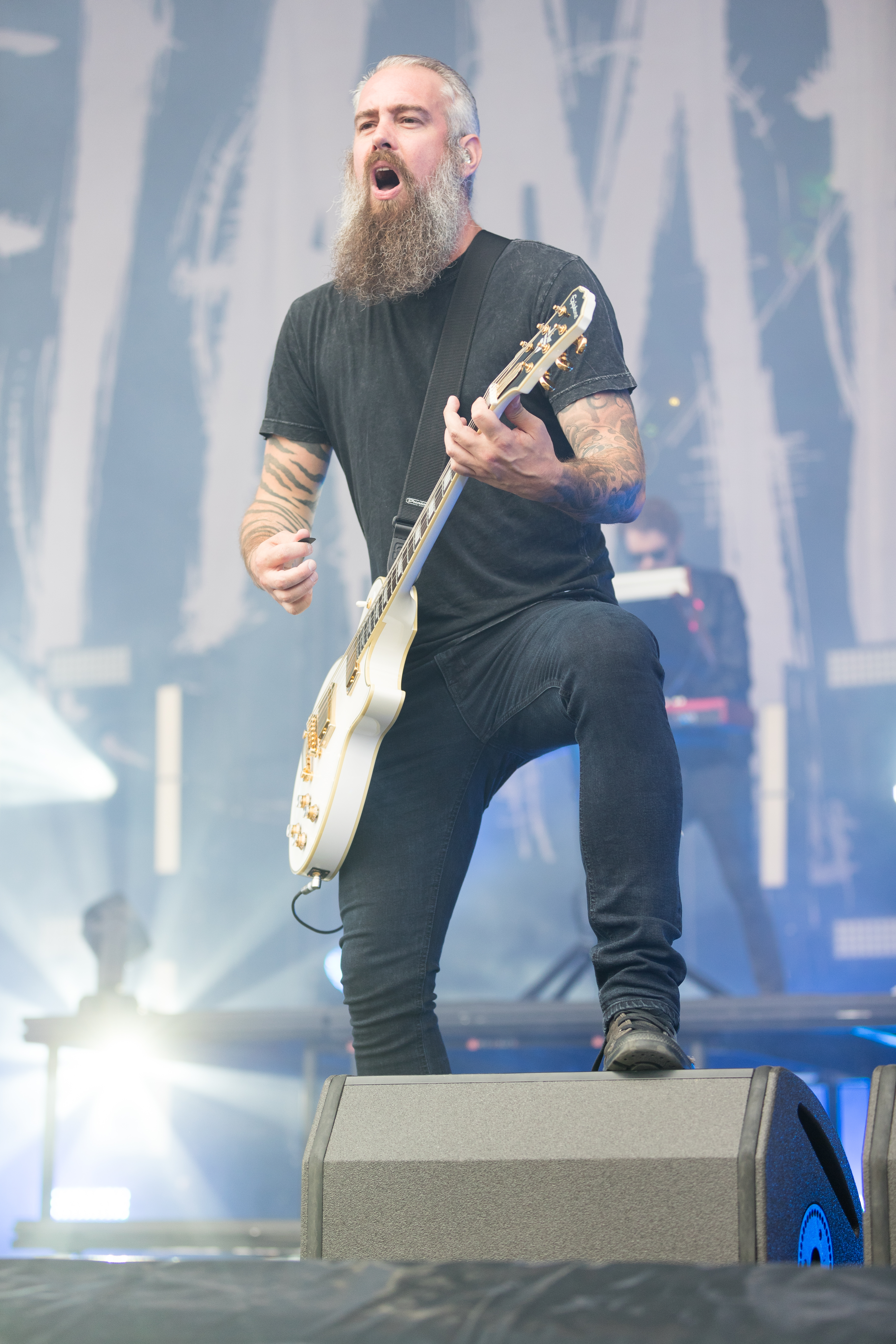
Lead guitarist Björn Gelotte at Rock am Ring 2017

During 1994, In Flames recorded and self-produced the EP Subterranean in Studio Fredman. In Flames still did not have a singer, so Henke Forss provided session vocals. In 1994, the band covered "Eye of the Beholder" for the Metallica tribute album Metal Militia: A Tribute to Metallica. In 1995, Subterranean was released. Subterranean garnered attention and led to a record deal with Nuclear Blast.

=== The Jester Race (1996) ===
In 1995, In Flames tired of session musicians and asked drummer Björn Gelotte to join the band full time. Strömblad became the rhythm guitarist. Six months later, they asked singer Anders Fridén to join the band permanently. That same year, the new line up recorded the band's second studio album, The Jester Race (released in 1996). This album was recorded in Studio Fredman, co-produced by the studio's owner, Fredrik Nordström. Gelotte provided some lead and acoustic guitars. Afterwards, In Flames toured with Samael, Grip Inc., and Kreator.

=== Whoracle (1997–1998) ===
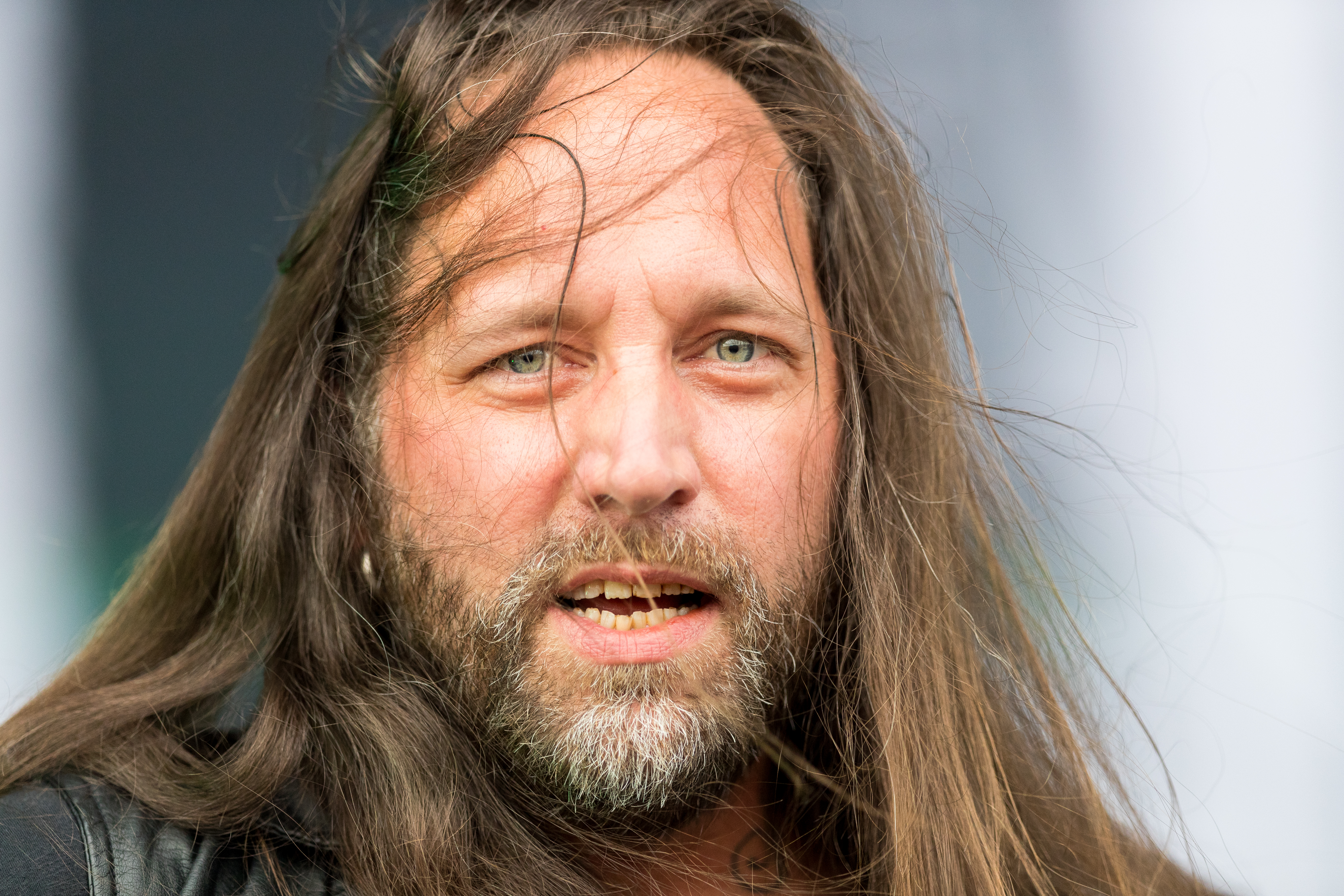
Rhythm guitarist Niclas Engelin at Rock am Ring 2017

In 1997, In Flames recorded and released their third studio album, Whoracle. This album was recorded in Studio Fredman and co-produced by Nordström. Gelotte provided lead and acoustic guitars. Ljungström and Larsson announced that they were leaving In Flames after recording the album. Niclas Engelin and Peter Iwers were recruited to fill in the vacant spots on guitar and bass, respectively, during a tour with Dimmu Borgir. After the tour, Engelin and Iwers joined the band as permanent members. The new line-up toured Europe and played their first two shows in Japan. By the end of that tour in 1998, Engelin quit In Flames. The band switched Gelotte from drums to lead guitar and recruited drummer Daniel Svensson.

=== Colony (1999) ===
In 1999, the new line-up recorded and released the band's fourth studio album, Colony. This album was recorded in Studio Fredman and co-produced by Nordström. The second solo on "Coerced Coexistence" was recorded by Kee Marcello. Afterwards, In Flames toured Europe, Japan, and played their first show in the United States during the Milwaukee Metal Fest.

=== Clayman (2000–2001) ===
In 2000, In Flames recorded and released their fifth studio album, Clayman. It was recorded in the same studio and co-produced by Nordström. In Flames toured with Dream Theater, Slipknot, and Testament. In August 2001, In Flames released The Tokyo Showdown, a live album recorded during the Japanese tour in November 2000.

=== Reroute to Remain (2002–2003) ===
In 2002, In Flames recorded and released their sixth studio album, Reroute to Remain. The album was produced by Daniel Bergstrand and recorded in a rented house in Denmark, except for the drums, which were recorded at Dug-Out Studio. Reroute to Remain was stylistic shift, adding clean vocals, catchier choruses and less growling. It was also their first album to have official singles released from it. That year, the band toured with Slayer, Soulfly, and Mudvayne.

=== Soundtrack to Your Escape (2004–2005) ===
In 2003, In Flames recorded their seventh studio album, Soundtrack to Your Escape, and released it in 2004. Most of the album was recorded in the house that the band rented in Denmark, with the drums recorded in Dug-Out Studio. This album was produced by Bergstrand. Soundtrack to Your Escape increased the band's popularity, selling 100,000 copies in the United States and yielding a No. 2 single on the Swedish charts with The Quiet Place. Four music videos were filmed: "The Quiet Place", "My Sweet Shadow", "F(r)iend" and "A Touch of Red", all of which were directed by Patric Ullaeus. The ensuing world tour included the band's first trip to Australia, where they played to mostly sold-out crowds. Afterward, In Flames toured with Judas Priest, Mötley Crüe, and Motörhead. In Flames was featured on the main stage at Ozzfest 2005.

=== Come Clarity (2006–2007) ===
In 2005, In Flames recorded and self-produced their eighth studio album, Come Clarity, in Dug-Out studio. That same year, In Flames released Used and Abused: In Live We Trust, a box set consisting of material filmed and recorded throughout various live performances during 2004. The DVD was filmed, edited and directed by Ullaeus. Also in 2005, In Flames signed with an additional record label, Ferret Music, so future releases could have better distribution in North America. In 2006, Come Clarity was released in North America through Ferret Music and elsewhere through Nuclear Blast. It became the band's first No. 1 album on the Swedish charts. A bonus DVD of In Flames playing all the songs in a rehearsal studio was released. Ullaeus directed their music video for "Take This Life". That same year, In Flames toured with Sepultura, co-headlined a U.S. tour with Lacuna Coil, joined The Unholy Alliance Tour, was one of the headliners on the Sounds of the Underground tour, and played on the main stage at Download Festival. In 2007, the band played in Dubai for the annual Dubai Desert Rock Festival. In Flames played at Bloodstock Open Air festival in August 2007. They played Wacken Open Air that month.

=== A Sense of Purpose (2008–2009) ===
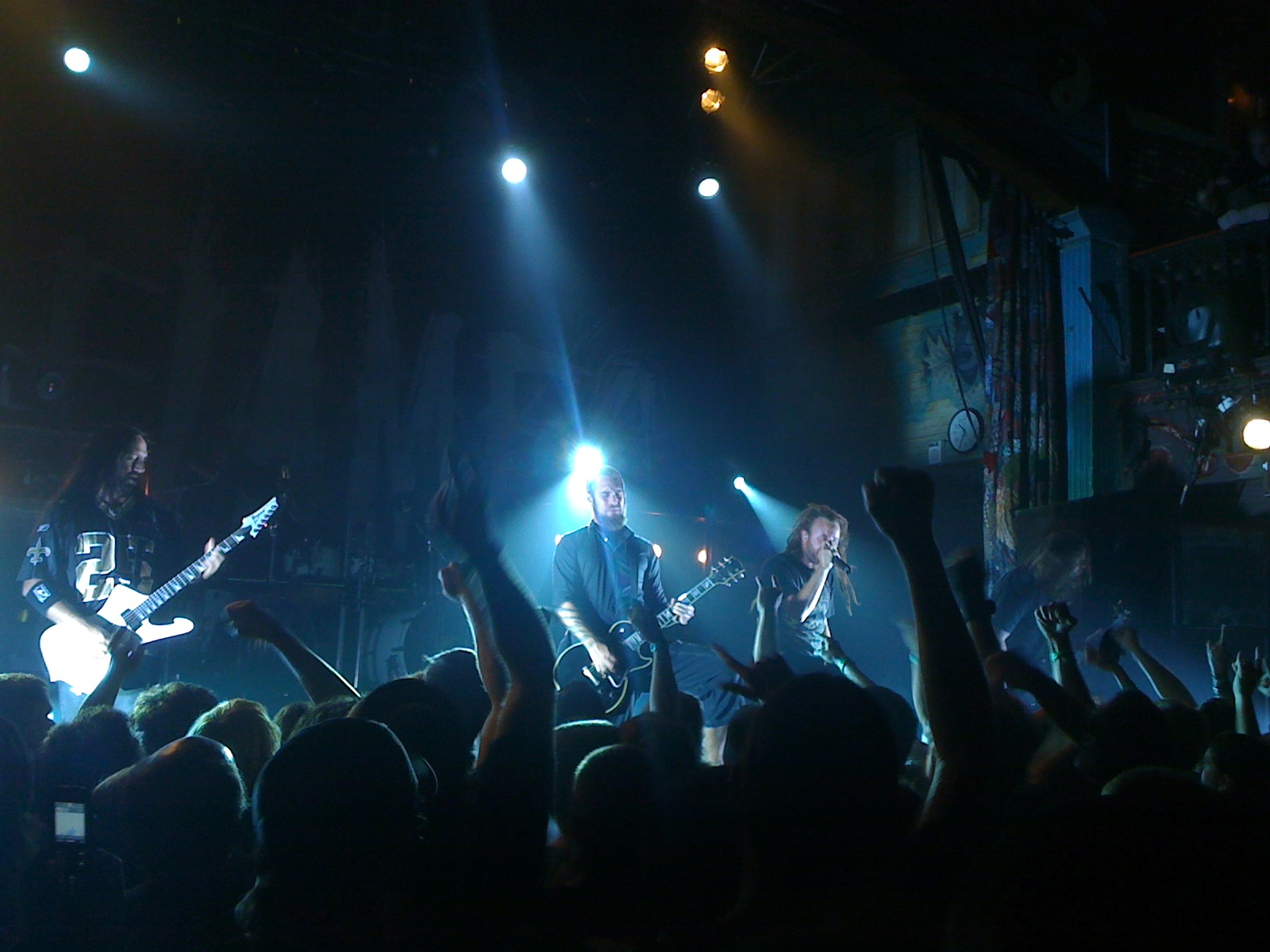
In Flames at House of Blues, New Orleans on 27 September 2009

In October 2007, In Flames finished recording their ninth studio album in IF Studios, their own studio in Gothenburg, Sweden (formerly Studio Fredman). During the recording sessions, the band released studio diaries documenting the recording process. On 23 January 2008, the band confirmed that they had recorded a video for the single "The Mirror's Truth", and posted photos from the video on their official Myspace profile. In Flames were featured on the Gigantour 3 North American tour with Megadeth, Children of Bodom, Job for a Cowboy, and High on Fire.

On 4 April 2008, In Flames released their ninth studio album, A Sense of Purpose. The first single from the new album was "The Mirror's Truth" and was released in Europe on 7 March 2008. In June 2008, In Flames performed at Metaltown Festival, Metalcamp, Graspop Metal Meeting, Nova Rock Festival, Rock am Ring and Rock im Park, Gigantour and Download Festival. In late August 2008, In Flames filmed a video for the second single, "Alias", directed by Ullaeus. From January 2008 to December 2009, In Flames toured on the A Sense of Purpose Tour.

On 3 February 2009, the band announced that Strömblad would not participate in the Australia/South America/Japan tour in order to get treatment for his alcohol abuse problems. Engelin was announced as his replacement for the tour. On 18 February, the band announced their United Kingdom and Ireland tour would not go ahead as planned due to Strömblad's alcohol rehabilitation and the birth of Iwers's child. On 4 March, the band announced that the third single from A Sense of Purpose was "Delight and Angers". The video premiered on the band's Myspace on 25 March. It was directed and produced by Ullaeus. Alex Pardee did the artwork for the song like he did with all of A Sense of Purpose.

The band joined Killswitch Engage, Dead by April, Every Time I Die and Maylene and the Sons of Disaster for the UK leg of the Taste of Chaos 2009 tour in November 2009.

=== Sounds of a Playground Fading (2010–2012) ===
The amicable departure of rhythm guitarist and founding member Jesper Strömblad was announced on the band's MySpace on 12 February 2010. Strömblad stated, "I'm determined to fight and defeat my demons once and for all...", with the remaining band members backing his decision, though in a more recent declaration Fridén stated that their relationship with Strömblad was not going well. On 28 February 2011, it was announced that Engelin had rejoined the band to replace Strömblad.

In early 2010, In Flames collaborated with Pendulum on their third studio album, Immersion. The song "Self Versus Self" is one of three collaborations on the album.

On 11 October 2010, In Flames entered IF Studios in Gothenburg to start recording their new album, tentatively titled Sounds of a Playground Fading. On 25 January 2011, the band announced that they had finished recording the album and it was being mixed. Roberto Laghi produced the album.

To support the album, In Flames performed at the Sonisphere Festival in Knebworth, and alongside Megadeth, Trivium, Machine Head, Godsmack, and Disturbed at the Mayhem Festival 2011. They played at Hellfest Festival 2011, headlining the second main stage, and Nova Rock Festival in Austria.

In March 2011, In Flames signed with Century Media Records. On 6 April 2011, In Flames announced the single "Deliver Us" was slated for a May release. For part of the European tour, Jonas Ekdahl of DeathDestruction filled in for Svensson on drums, after Svensson remained in Sweden following the birth of his child.

Sounds of a Playground Fading was released in Sweden on 15 June 2011, on 17 June 2011 in Germany, Austria, Switzerland and Norway, on 20 June 2011 in the UK, Benelux, France, Greece, Denmark and Portugal, on 21 June 2011 in North America, Spain and Italy, on 22 June 2011 in Finland, Hungary and Japan, and on 24 June 2011 in Australia and New Zealand. A video was made for "Deliver Us". It was filmed in Gothenburg, and was again directed by Ullaeus, who also directed the second video from Sounds of a Playground Fading, "Where the Dead Ships Dwell".

In an interview at Canada's Heavy MTL festival on 12 August 2012, frontman Anders Fridén revealed that In Flames would "start thinking about" recording their next studio album in 2013.

=== Siren Charms (2013–2015) ===
In Flames began recording their eleventh studio album in August 2013. On 10 April 2014, the In Flames website appeared to be hacked. The alleged hacker threatened to leak information the next day. The band posted on its Facebook, saying, "We have encountered some issues regarding our online platforms. We want to assure you that no Jesterhead member information has been compromised, and our team is working on a solution right now. We apologize for the inconvenience." The site was not really hacked. The following day, the band's website was updated with a link to the supposed leak. A short video announced that the new album would be titled Siren Charms. The album was released on 9 September 2014, via the band's new label, Epic Records. Siren Charms includes vocals recorded by fans. Following release of the album, they started a World tour, set to last throughout 2015. On 12 October 2014, the band officially announced on their Facebook page that they would release a live Blu-ray/DVD and CD set based on their show in Gothenburg, which took place in November 2014 and was officially released on 23 September 2016 titled 'Sounds from the Heart of Gothenburg'. Longtime drummer Daniel Svensson announced his departure from the band to focus on his family life on 7 November 2015.

=== Battles (2016–2017) ===
In early 2016, In Flames began recording a new album in Los Angeles, and finished it in April.

On 25 August 2016, In Flames posted a YouTube link to the song "The End" along with a new profile picture with the In Flames logo accompanied by the word "Battles". It was later revealed that Battles would be the title of their twelfth studio album, released worldwide on 11 November 2016 through Nuclear Blast.

On 17 September 2016, the band announced on their Facebook page that Joe Rickard, formerly of American rock band RED, who performed session drums on Battles, was the new permanent drummer, replacing Daniel Svensson.

On 29 November 2016, Peter Iwers announced the tour supporting Battles would be his last with In Flames. That left Anders and Björn as the only members in the band who have constantly remained in the lineup since the 1990s. Bassist Håkan Skoger, who previously worked with Friden on his side project 'Passenger', played live with the band on their first UK tour date in Scotland. The band recruited bassist Bryce Paul to play bass on their American tour.

In Flames toured North America in May 2017 with support from Kataklysm. In December 2017, In Flames released 'Down, Wicked, and No Good' EP, which included three covers and a live performance.

On 5 July 2018, it was announced the band recruited drummer Tanner Wayne, replacing Joe Rickard.

=== I, the Mask (2018–2021) ===
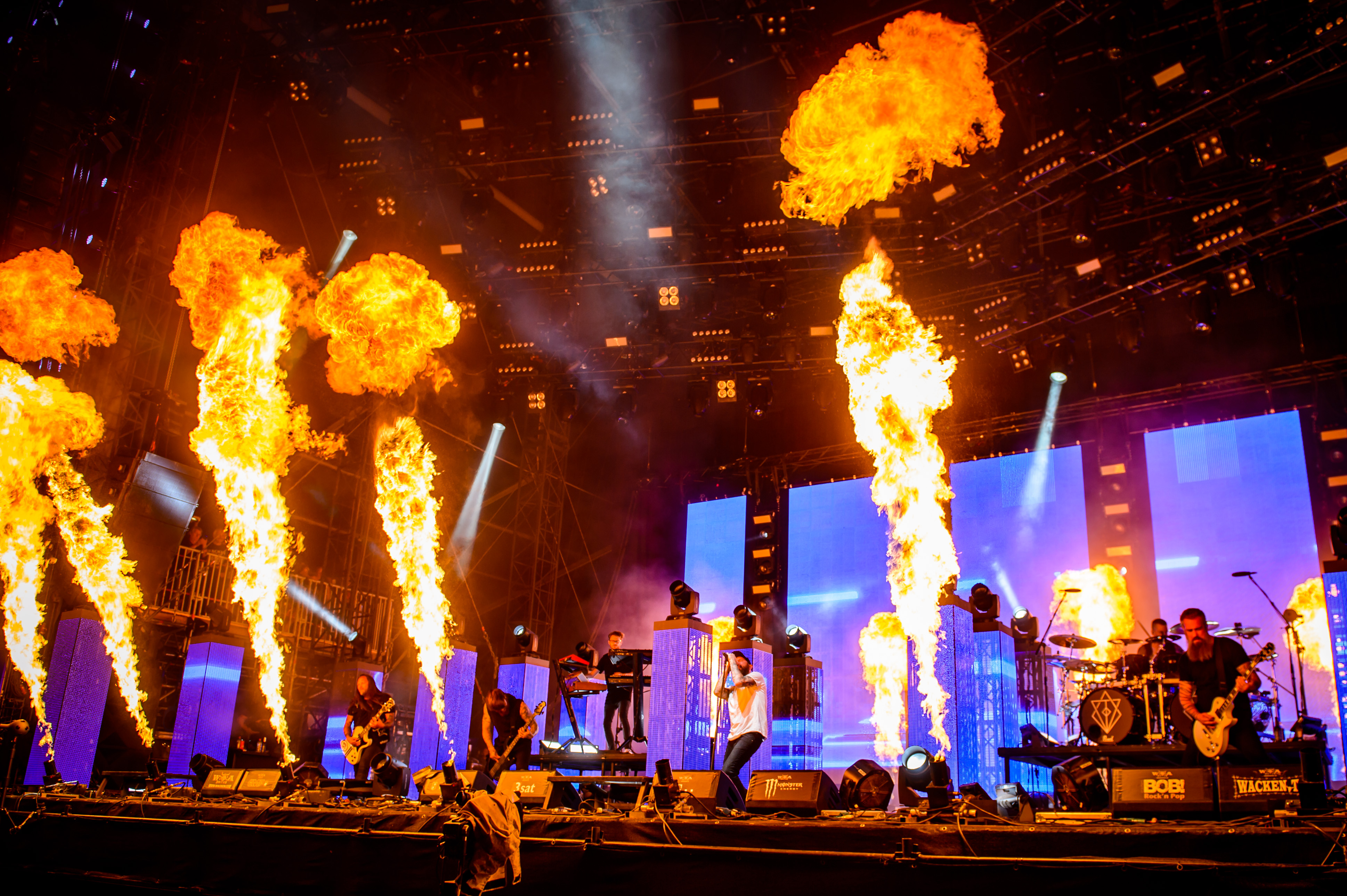
In Flames at Wacken Open Air 2018

On 14 December 2018, In Flames announced that their 13th album, I, the Mask, would be released on 1 March 2019. As part of this announcement, they released two singles from the upcoming album, "I Am Above" and "(This Is Our) House". The music video for "I Am Above" features Swedish actor Martin Wallström lyp syncing the song in one shot against a black backdrop and does not show any members of the band. The lyric video released for "(This Is Our) House" features live concert footage from the Borgholm Brinner music festival in Sweden. The album was produced by Howard Benson, mixed by Chris Lord-Alge, and mastered by Ted Jensen. On 10 January 2019, the lyric video for "I, the Mask", the title track of the album, was released via the Nuclear Blast Records' YouTube channel. In Flames was set to open up for Megadeth and Lamb of God with Trivium in the summer of 2020 in North America. The event was rescheduled to 2021 due to the COVID-19 pandemic. Due to international visa issues caused by the pandemic, In Flames withdrew from the tour and were replaced with Hatebreed.

On 28 August 2020, In Flames released a 20th anniversary edition of Clayman. It features remastered versions of every song as well as re-recorded versions of "Only for the Weak", "Bullet Ride", "Pinball Map", and "Clayman". In 2021, Stanne, Strömblad, Svensson, Iwers and Engelin announced the formation of the band The Halo Effect, consisting of former In Flames members.

=== Foregone (2022–2025) ===
In early 2022, In Flames announced the festival "Dalhalla Brinner", their own festival taking place in the Dalhalla open air theater. Opening for the band were Orbit Culture, Lorna Shore and Tesseract.

On 13 June 2022, In Flames released the song "State of Slow Decay" and announced they were resigning with Nuclear Blast. The song was noted for sounding similar to the band's earlier melodic death metal works. On 1 August, the band released another single, "The Great Deceiver". On 15 September 2022, In Flames announced that their 14th studio album, Foregone, would be released on 10 February 2023. The same day as the album's announcement, a visualizer for the song "Foregone Pt. 1" was released. The album's fourth single, "Foregone Pt. 2", was released on 7 November with a music video. The album's fifth single, "Meet Your Maker", was released on 16 January 2023 with a music video. On 8 June 2023, the band announced that bassist Bryce Paul departed from the band on good terms and revealed his replacement, Liam Wilson of The Dillinger Escape Plan.

On 27 May 2025, the band announced that they parted ways with drummer Tanner Wayne. Two days later, the band announced Jon Rice as their live drummer for their upcoming European tour.

=== Upcoming fifteenth album (2026–present) ===
On 4 February 2026, the band began recording their upcoming fifteenth studio album in Los Angeles with Jon Rice, confirming him as the official drummer of the band.

The band would support deathcore band Distant on their North American tour in May 2026, along with Swedish metalcore band Thrown. They are also scheduled to perform at the Wacken Open Air festival in 2026.

== Musical style and lyrical themes ==
In Flames, along with Dark Tranquillity and At the Gates, pioneered what is now known as melodic death metal. In addition, In Flames has also been described as a precursor of the 2000s metalcore sound, which was heavily influenced by melodic death metal in general. In 2006, In Flames made their own metalcore album Come Clarity. The founding members of all three bands all lived in Gothenburg, Sweden and they were all friends who shared the same musical interests. Eventually, the group of friends branched off into three bands with the same musical direction: In Flames, Dark Tranquillity, and At the Gates.

Jesper Strömblad formed In Flames to write music that combined the melodic guitar style of Iron Maiden with the brutality of death metal, something which he stated he had never heard any band do. In writing songs, Strömblad also decided to make use of keyboards, something which was at the time uncommon in death metal. Ever since In Flames' debut studio album, Lunar Strain, the band has made use of keyboards. However, despite their sometimes heavy use of keyboards in their music, they still refuse to recruit a full-time keyboardist.

In Flames' musical style is characterized by the constant use of harmonized lead guitar melodies and screaming-style singing along with death growl. In early albums such as The Jester Race, In Flames would often employ two harmonized lead guitars playing over a rhythm guitar. However, since the band only has two guitar players, they found it hard to reproduce those songs during live performances and ever since Reroute to Remain they have focused on writing songs with the intention of playing them live. On the album Soundtrack to Your Escape, the band focused on less guitar melodies, giving place for more synths. However, this has not been continued on the later albums.

In Flames' vocal style is characterized by the use of growled vocals or screamed vocals complemented at times by clean vocals. On more recent albums such as Come Clarity, the band makes more prominent use of clean vocals, especially during choruses. In Flames' lyrics have also varied during their career. In early albums such as The Jester Race and Whoracle, In Flames' lyrics focused on astrology, mankind, and other global themes. On later albums such as Soundtrack to Your Escape and Come Clarity, In Flames' lyrics focus more on personal issues, thoughts, and other introspective themes.

Since Reroute to Remain was released in 2002, In Flames' fan-base has been split because of the gradual change in style towards a more alternative metal sound. The stylistic changes include screamed and clean vocals, as opposed to the death growl on the early records, more prominent rhythm section and less guitar melodies and solos, more obvious use of synthesizers and electronics, and a clear influence from modern American metal, especially in the uplifting chorus melodies. This later style has been mostly described as alternative metal. Since Siren Charms and the subsequent studio album Battles, they have more extensively used clean vocals as opposed to screams and growls and have played a softer overall sound, putting more emphasis on a melodic alternative metal direction. Very minimal elements of their earlier melodic death metal sound are utilized at this point. However, some very mild elements of this style can still sometimes be heard in their music. Fridén's clean singing style has altered drastically as it is now more prominent and he has taken on a higher-pitched vocal range. This change has often received harsh criticism from older fans for greatly abandoning their roots and instead favouring a much more commercial sound and playing a musical style that is completely unrelated to their original sound.

Foregone was widely considered to be a return to form by the band, with reviewers arguing it's the first album that successfully combined the "old" and "new" styles of the band.

=== Legacy ===
In Flames are widely considered one of the pioneers of the melodic death metal sound, and have influenced many bands. They have been especially influential on metalcore, with bands such as Darkest Hour, As I Lay Dying, Trivium, Avenged Sevenfold, All That Remains and Still Remains naming them as a source of inspiration. They have also influenced a number of subsequent melodic death metal bands, including Insomnium, Omnium Gatherum, and Blood Stain Child. Nita Strauss has also listed In Flames as an inspiration in her playing and love of music.

== Miscellaneous ==
=== Awards ===
In Flames has been awarded four Grammis awards (the Swedish equivalent of the Grammy Awards) to date. In 2005, In Flames won their first Grammis award in the category of Best Hard Rock/Metal Album for Soundtrack to Your Escape. In 2006, In Flames won the Swedish Export Award, their second Grammis award. In Flames was the first metal band to ever win that award and the Swedish economy minister at the time, Thomas Östros, was quoted as saying "Thanks to In Flames, Sweden now have a metal band in the absolute world elite." In 2007, In Flames once again won the category of Best Hard Rock/Metal Album for Come Clarity. They have also won the "Best international Band" award from the Metal Hammer Golden Gods Awards in 2008.

=== Jester Head mascot ===
When In Flames were recording their second studio album, The Jester Race, Anders Fridén and Niklas Sundin came up with an idea to create a symbol/mascot for In Flames. The result was the Jester Head. This symbol made its first appearance in the cover artwork of The Jester Race. The Jester Head is also featured in much In Flames' merchandise and has been featured in banners as part of In Flames' live set. Swedish ice hockey goaltender, Robin Lehner, who is also from Gothenburg had the Jester Head painted on several of his protective face masks.

== Band members ==
Initially formed as a side project by Ceremonial Oath bassist Jesper Strömblad in 1990, the group's first full lineup in 1993 featured drummer Strömblad, guitarist Glenn Ljungström and bassist Johan Larsson. As the band were without an official vocalist, their 1994 debut Lunar Strain featured contributions from Dark Tranquillity guitarist Mikael Stanne, as well as several guest musicians. The 1995 EP Subterranean featured vocals by Dawn's Henke Forss, as well as drums by Daniel Erlandsson of Eucharist and Anders Jivarp of Dark Tranquillity. Around the time of the EP's release, Björn Gelotte joined In Flames as the band's first official drummer, so Strömblad switched to guitar and keyboards, and a short time later Anders Fridén was brought in from Dark Tranquillity as the group's first official vocalist.

The lineup of Strömblad, Ljungström, Larsson, Gelotte and Fridén released The Jester Race in 1996 and Whoracle in 1997. By the end of the recording for Whoracle, however, both Ljungström and Larsson had announced that they were leaving the band. They were replaced for a short tour by Niclas Engelin and Peter Iwers, both of whom were ultimately retained as official members. Engelin only remained until the following year, however, and his role was taken over by Gelotte. The vacated position of drummer was soon filled by Daniel Svensson. The band's lineup remained stable for over a decade, releasing several albums.

In February 2010, founding member Strömblad announced that he was leaving In Flames, with the band admitting that "in order to keep a very dear friend this is probably for the best". He was replaced for tour dates later in the year by a returning Engelin, who was later announced as a full member of the group in March 2011. In late 2015, long-term drummer Svensson also left In Flames, explaining that he wanted to "spend more time with ... [his] wife and three daughters". Joe Rickard was brought in as Svensson's replacement the following year. Iwers also departed a year after Svensson, explaining that he felt it was "the time to move on with other musical and non-musical adventures". Bryce Paul took over his place for future tour dates. In July 2018, Tanner Wayne replaced Rickard.

In 2018, Engelin went on hiatus, with former Megadeth member Chris Broderick filling for live shows. The status of Engelin's belonging of band was unknown, despite Engelin stating that he was still in the band in an August 2020 interview, before refusing to answer the same question in July 2022. Anders confirmed that Chris was "100% officially in the band", hinting that Engelin left or was fired. On 8 June 2023, Bryce Paul announced his departure from the band. Liam Wilson of The Dillinger Escape Plan replaced him, initially as a live member, before becoming official by May 2024. Tanner Wayne left the band in May 2025. Later that month, the band announced Jon Rice as touring drummer. In February 2026, the band entered the studio with Rice, implying his full member status.

=== Official members ===
==== Current ====
Image	Name	Years active	Instruments	Release contributions
	Björn Gelotte	1995–present	guitars; drums (1995–1998)	all In Flames releases from The Jester Race (1996) onwards
	Anders Fridén	1995–present	lead vocals	all In Flames releases from The Jester Race (1996) onwards
	Chris Broderick	2022–present (touring 2019–2022)	guitars	Foregone (2023)
	Liam Wilson	2024–present (touring 2023–2024)	bass; backing vocals	none to date
	Jon Rice	2026–present (touring 2025–2026)	drums	none to date

==== Former ====
Image	Name	Years active	Instruments	Release contributions
	Jesper Strömblad	1990–2010	guitars and keyboards (1993–2010); drums (1990–1994)	all In Flames releases from Lunar Strain (1994) to A Sense of Purpose (2008)
	Johan Larsson	1990–1997	bass; backing vocals (1993–1997); lead vocals (1990–1993)	all In Flames releases from Lunar Strain (1994) to Whoracle (1997)
	Anders Iwers	1990–1993	guitars	Lunar Strain (1994) reissue demo tracks
	Glenn Ljungström	1993–1997	guitars	all In Flames releases from Lunar Strain (1994) to Whoracle (1997)
	Mikael Stanne	1993–1995	lead vocals	Demo '93 (1993); Lunar Strain (1994)
	Karl "Carl" Näslund	1993–1994 (died 2024)	guitars	Demo '93 (1993); Lunar Strain (1994)
	Daniel Erlandsson	1994–1995	drums	Subterranean (1995)
	Peter Iwers	1997–2016	bass	all In Flames releases from Colony (1999) to Battles (2016)
	Niclas Engelin	1997–1998; 2011–2022 (touring 2010–2011; on hiatus 2018–2022)	guitars	all In Flames releases from Siren Charms (2014) to I, the Mask (2019)
	Daniel Svensson	1998–2015	drums	all In Flames releases from Colony (1999) to Siren Charms (2014)
	Joe Rickard	2016–2018	drums	Battles (2016); I, the Mask (2019); Foregone (2023)
	Bryce Paul	2017–2023	bass; backing vocals	I, the Mask (2019); Foregone (2023)
	Tanner Wayne	2018–2025	drums	I, the Mask (2019); Foregone (2023)

=== Other contributors ===
==== Session ====
Image	Name	Years active	Instruments	Release contributions
	Örjan Örnkloo	2002–present	keyboards; programming	all In Flames releases from Reroute to Remain (2002) onwards
	Anders Jivarp	1994	drums	Subterranean (1995)
	Henke Forss	1994	vocals	Subterranean (1995)
	Fredrik Nordström	1995–2000	keyboards; synthesizers; programming; slide guitar	The Jester Race (1996); Colony (1999); Clayman (2000)
	Charlie Storm	1998–2000	synthesizers; programming	Colony (1999); Clayman (2000)
	Emilia Feldt	2013–2016	vocals	Siren Charms (2014); Sounds from the Heart of Gothenburg (2016)
	Javin "ØRÍØN" Sousa	2018	guitars	Down, Wicked & No Good (2018)

==== Touring ====
Image	Name	Years active	Instruments	Notes
	Dick Lövgren	2000	bass	Dick Lövgren (later of Meshuggah and Armageddon) supported In Flames on two North American tours around 2000.
	Patrik Jensen	2013	guitars	Jensen briefly replaced Engelin, who became a father in 2013.
	Håkan Skoger	2016–2017	bass	Replaced Peter Iwers on touring dates before Bryce Paul took his place.
	Niels Nielsen	2017–present	keyboards	Nielsen joined as touring keyboardist in 2017.

== Discography ==
Studio albums

- Lunar Strain (1994)
- The Jester Race (1996)
- Whoracle (1997)
- Colony (1999)
- Clayman (2000)
- Reroute to Remain (2002)
- Soundtrack to Your Escape (2004)
- Come Clarity (2006)
- A Sense of Purpose (2008)
- Sounds of a Playground Fading (2011)
- Siren Charms (2014)
- Battles (2016)
- I, the Mask (2019)
- Foregone (2023)
