= Björn Gelotte =

Swedish guitarist (born 1975)

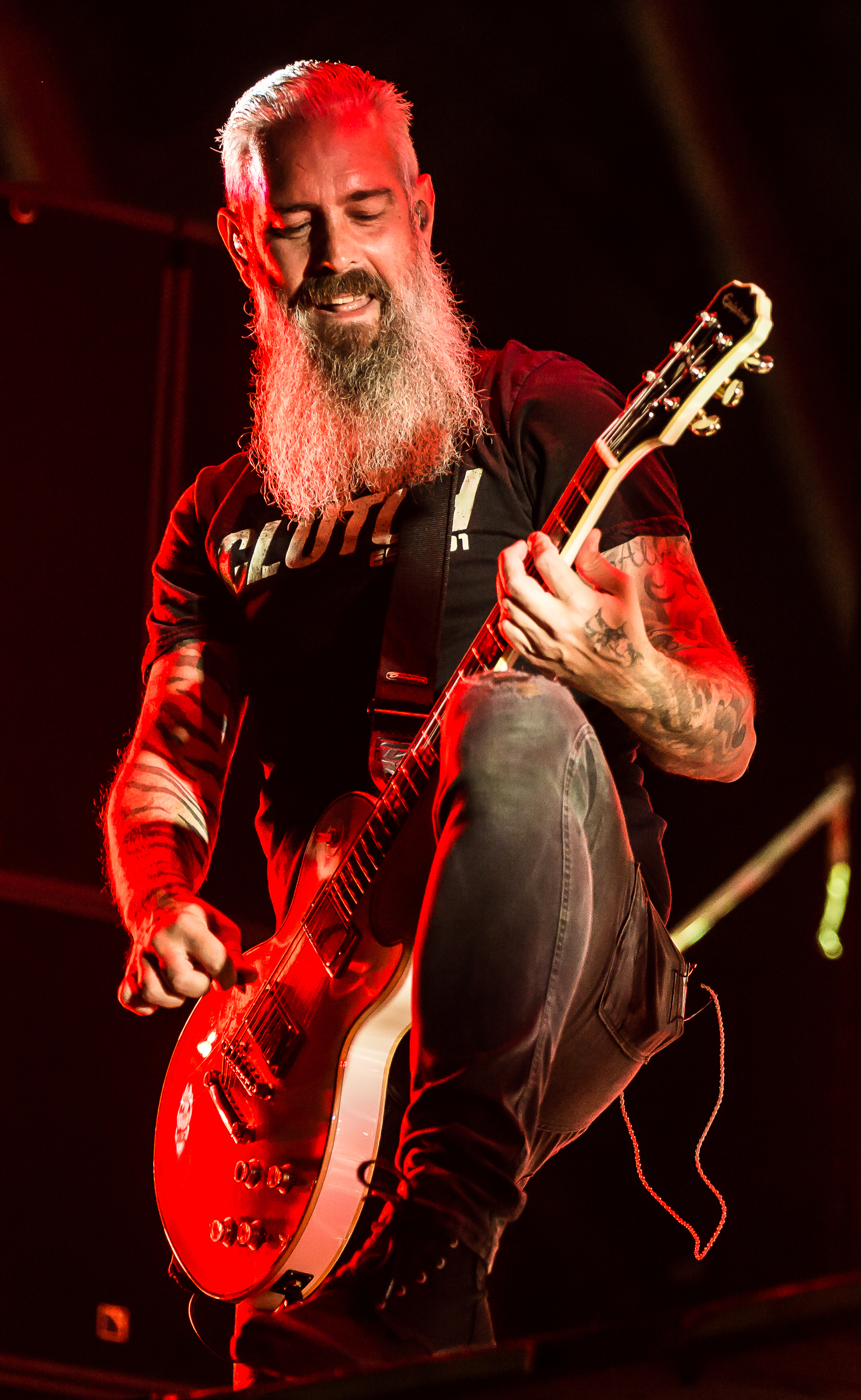
- Gelotte in 2023

Background information
- Born: Björn Ingvar Gelotte; 27 August 1975 (age 51)
- Genres: Melodic death metal, alternative metal
- Occupations: Musician, songwriter
- Instrument: Guitar
- Years active: 1994–present
- Member of: In Flames, All Ends
- Website: inflames.com

Björn Gelotte (born 27 August 1975) is a Swedish guitarist and songwriter, best known as the lead guitarist for heavy metal band In Flames. He originally joined the band as the drummer in 1995, and continued in this position during The Jester Race (1996) and Whoracle (1997). He switched to his current position on guitar after Niclas Engelin left the band and has played solely guitars since Colony (1999), sharing lead/rhythm guitar duties with former In Flames guitarist Jesper Strömblad. After Strömblad's departure, he is the most senior member of In Flames.

In March 2004, Gelotte and Strömblad were both ranked No. 70 out of 100 Greatest Heavy Metal Guitarists of all time by Guitar World.

== Other projects ==
Before joining In Flames, Gelotte was a member of Flesh of Sights.

He was involved in a side project called All Ends, which he and his former In Flames bandmate Jesper Strömblad wrote the songs for. Björn's sister was one of the singers for All Ends. Neither of them plan to play in the side project live due to In Flames' demanding schedule. He also played guitar on the track "Self Versus Self" by UK/Australian drum and bass act Pendulum, along with his bandmates Anders Fridén and Peter Iwers.

Gelotte did several guest appearances, contributing a guitar solo on the track "Letters From Neverend", from the album Schlacht by the band Avatar, and performing lead guitar for the song "Force of Hand", from the album Atoma by the band Dark Tranquillity.

== Equipment ==
Gelotte uses a Gibson Les Paul Custom and a custom shop Les Paul, both with EMG 81 (bridge) and EMG 85 (neck) active pickups. The custom shop Les Paul has a few changes to the stock model, such as inlay blocks similar to the Les Paul Supreme. He uses a POD XT and other Line 6 equipment, Dunlop custom strings, and Dunlop .88 MM Tortex picks. On In Flames' albums up to Whoracle, both Björn and co-guitarist Jesper Strömblad exclusively tuned their guitars to C standard. From Colony to Reroute to Remain, In Flames started using Drop A# tuning, on some of the tracks, and on all albums since Soundtrack to Your Escape, In Flames have been using drop A# tuning exclusively. An exception to this, however, is seen on Reroute to Remain, where Björn and Jesper tune their guitars to drop G on the track "Transparent".

In 2015, Epiphone announced the release of a limited edition Björn Gelotte signature Les Paul Custom. It has a mahogany body and neck, ebony fretboard with pearl block inlays, ebony gloss finish, and gold hardware. This model has a thicker "custom '59" neck profile and includes such premium features as Grover tuning machines, gold covered EMG 81 and 85 active pickups, and comes with a hardshell case with custom screen printing. The headstock inlay is a stylized version of the In Flames "jester head" logo.

Guitars:

- Gibson Les Paul Custom
- Epiphone Signature Les Paul Custom
- ESP Eclipse

Amps

- Marshall JVM 410H
- Peavey 5150
- EVH 5150 III
- Mesa/Boogie Dual Rectifier

Effects

- Line 6 Pod XT

misc

- Dunlop strings Custom wound .12, .16, .22, .38, .52, .68 gauge strings (Gelotte's strings have a coating over them because he is allergic to nickel)
- Dunlop .88 MM Tortex picks
- Dunlop Ultex Sharp Picks
