= Peter Iwers =

Swedish bassist

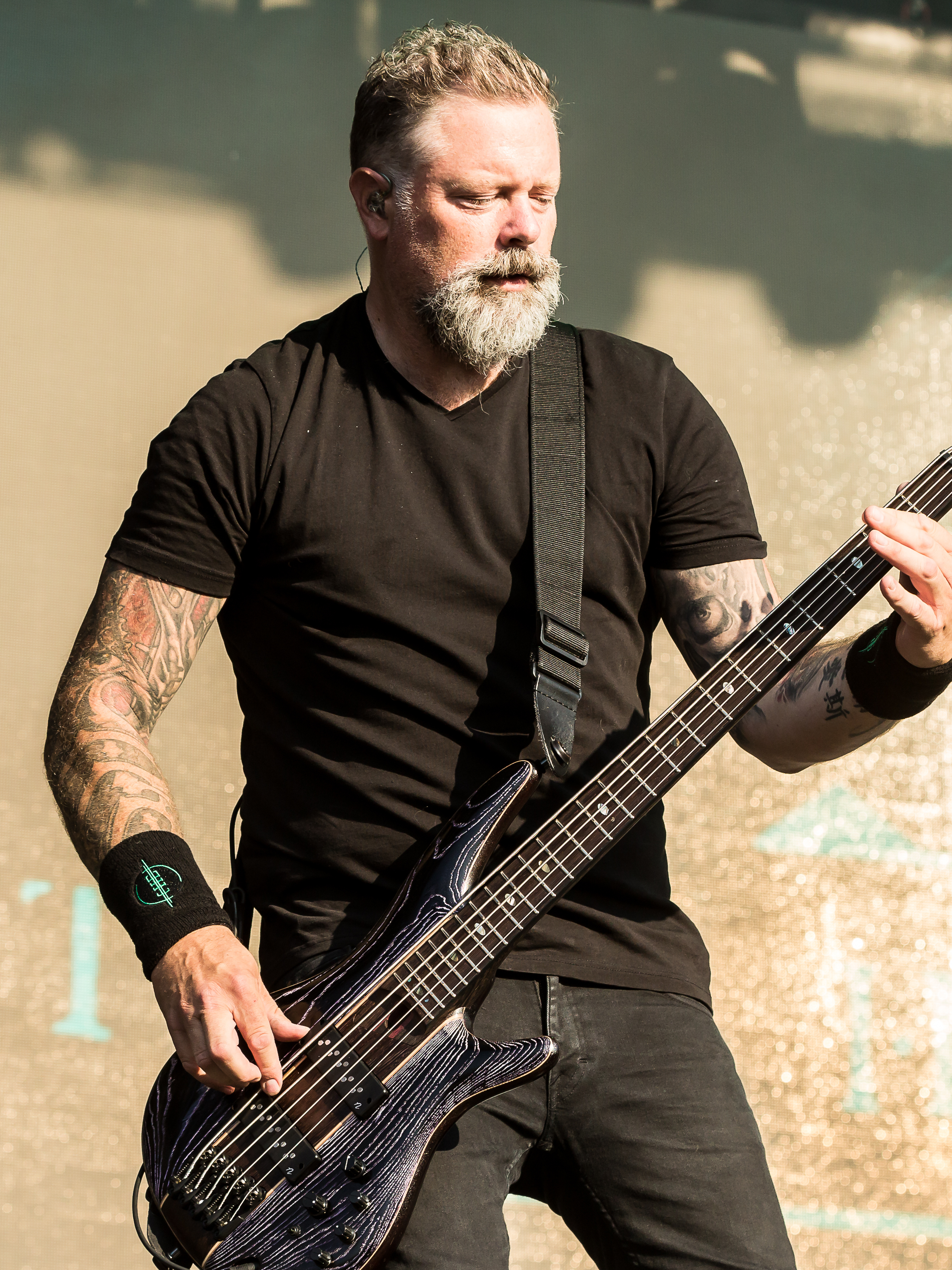
- Iwers performing with the Halo Effect in 2023

Background information
- Also known as: DJ Kaos
- Born: 15 May 1975 (age 51)
- Origin: Gothenburg, Sweden
- Genres: Melodic death metal; alternative metal
- Occupation: Bassist
- Years active: 1997–present

Peter Iwers (born on 15 May 1975) is a Swedish bass player. He currently plays for the melodic death metal band the Halo Effect. He was a member of the heavy metal band In Flames from their 1999 album Colony up until their 2016 album Battles, originally replacing Johan Larsson who departed after 1997's Whoracle. He was also the bassist for the band Cyhra with former In Flames bandmate Jesper Strömblad from 2017 to 2018. Before he joined in Flames, Iwers played in a band called Chameleon.

== Personal life ==
Iwers has two daughters and one son. His older brother Anders is also a bass player, who plays for Tiamat and played for Avatarium (2014–2015) & Dark Tranquillity (2015–2021). Peter now brews beer at his brewery outside Gothenburg, Odd Island Brewing, together with founder and co-owner Daniel Svensson, also of In Flames and the Halo Effect bandmate.

== Musical style and influences ==
Iwers' bass playing style has been influenced by Mike Porcaro from Toto, Geddy Lee from Rush and John Myung from Dream Theater.

== Guest bassist ==
- Psalms of Extinction by Pain (2007)
- Immersion by Pendulum (2010)
