= Penetrations from the Lost World =

- 2003 Reissue

EP by Dimension Zero
- Released: May 1997
- Recorded: 1997
- Studio: Studio Fredman
- Genre: Melodic death metal
- Length: 42:30 (re-issue)
- Label: Regain
- Producer: Fredrik Nordström

Dimension Zero chronology
| Penetrations from the Lost World (1997) | Silent Night Fever (2002) |

Professional ratings
Review scores
| Source | Rating |
|---|---|
| Imperiumi | 6.5/10 |
| Metal.de | 8/10 |
| Powermetal.de | Favourable |
| Rock Hard | 7/10 |
| Vampster | Favourable |

Penetrations from the Lost World is the first EP by the Swedish melodic death metal band Dimension Zero.

It was re-issued in 2003 with bonus tracks.

== Track listing ==
| No. | Title | Length |
|---|---|---|
| 1. | "Through the Virgin Sky" | 4:53 |
| 2. | "Dead Silent Shriek" | 3:54 |
| 3. | "Forgotten... But Not Forgiven" | 3:35 |
| 4. | "Everlasting Neverness" | 4:10 |

2003 Reissue
| No. | Title | Length |
|---|---|---|
| 5. | "Condemned" | 3:02 |
| 6. | "Helter Skelter" | 3:07 |
| 7. | "Silent Night Fever (live)" | 4:41 |
| 8. | "Not Even Dead (live)" | 4:04 |
| 9. | "The Murder-Inn (live)" | 2:58 |
| 10. | "They Are Waiting to Take Us (live)" | 3:39 |
| 11. | "Through the Virgin Sky (live)" | 4:32 |

Tracks 5-6 recorded in November 2001. Tracks 7-11 recorded live in Osaka, Nagoya and Tokyo, Japan, in May 2002.

== Line-up ==
- Jocke Göthberg - vocals, lyrics
- Glenn Ljungström - guitar, music composition, rhythm guitar (tracks 7-11)
- Jesper Strömblad - bass guitar, music composition
- Hans Nilsson - drums
- Daniel Antonsson - lead guitar (tracks 7-11)
