= He Who Shall Not Bleed =

Studio album by Dimension Zero
- Released: 22 August 2007
- Recorded: December 2006
- Studios: IF Studios in Gothenburg, Sweden
- Genre: Melodic death metal
- Length: 34:16
- Labels: Toy's Factory (Japan), Vic Records (Europe), Candlelight (US)
- Producers: Arnold Lindberg, Dimension Zero

Dimension Zero chronology
This Is Hell (2003)	He Who Shall Not Bleed (2007)

Professional ratings
Review scores
Source	Rating
AllMusic	3/5 stars
Blabbermouth	7.5/10
Chronicles of Chaos	8.5/10
Imperiumi	7.5/10
Metal Hammer Germany	Unfavourable
Metal Sucks	2/5 stars
Metal.de	8/10
Ox-Fanzine	8/10
Rock Hard	8/10
Terrorizer	8/10

He Who Shall Not Bleed is the third album by the Swedish melodic death metal band Dimension Zero.

The sample at the beginning of the title song is a line by James Gregory from the film Beneath the Planet of the Apes.

"A Paler Shade of White" could be a reference to "A Whiter Shade of Pale".

== Track listing ==
1. "He Who Shall Not Bleed" – 2:25
2. "Unto Others" – 2:32
3. "A Paler Shade of White (A Darker Side of Black)" – 2:33
4. "Hell Is Within" – 3:02
5. "Red Dead Heat" – 1:57
6. "I Can Hear the Dark" – 3:11
7. "Going Deep" – 2:33
8. "Is" – 3:12
9. "Deny" – 3:30
10. "The Was" – 3:10
11. "Way to Shine" – 4:05
12. "Stayin' Alive" (Bee Gees cover) (Bonus Track) – 2:01
13. "Rövarvisan" (Bonus Track) – 1:30. (Originally a children's song written by Thorbjørn Egner from the book People and Robbers of Cardemon Town.)

== Musicians ==
- Jocke "Grave" Göthberg – vocals
- Jesper Strömblad – guitar, bass
- Daniel Antonsson – guitar, bass
- Hans Nilsson – drums
- Recorded and mixed by Arnold Lindberg
- Produced by Arnold Lindberg / Dimension Zero
