= A Sense of Purpose =

Studio album by In Flames
- Released: 1 April 2008
- Recorded: September–November 2007 at IF Studios, Gothenburg, Sweden
- Genre: Alternative metal
- Length: 47:59
- Labels: Nuclear Blast, Koch
- Producers: In Flames, Roberto Laghi, Daniel Bergstrand

In Flames chronology
Come Clarity (2006)	A Sense of Purpose (2008)	Sounds of a Playground Fading (2011)

Singles from A Sense of Purpose
- 1. "The Mirror's Truth" Released: 7 March 2008; 2. "Alias" Released: 26 September 2008; 3. "Delight and Angers" Released: 25 March 2009

A Sense of Purpose is the ninth studio album by Swedish heavy metal band In Flames. As the band's first album with no death metal hallmarks whatsoever, it first released in Japan on 26 March 2008. It was released on 1 April and 4 April 2008 in North America and Europe respectively. A Sense of Purpose is the final In Flames album with founding guitarist Jesper Strömblad, at this point the last original member, as he quit in February 2010, ending the lineup that had stayed together since Colony. The album debuted at number 1 on the official Swedish album chart. On 21 May 2009, the song "Disconnected" became available to download for the video game Guitar Hero World Tour.

== Musical style ==
Similar to previous In Flames albums, A Sense of Purpose showcased the band's ability to combine many elements such as rich keyboard use and distinct melodies, with thrash and heavy metal sounds. A Sense of Purpose contains the band's longest recorded song to date, "The Chosen Pessimist".

In an interview, Björn Gelotte said this about the album:

"It's awesome. It's energetic, melodic, pretty much in the same vein. But we always try to mix it up a bit and try to put some dynamics into the songs, even though they are very intense. If you've heard the previous ones, you pretty much know what vein we're going to be. It's just a matter of small experiments in different songs."

== Release ==
A Sense of Purpose was released in a limited edition box set version, of which only 1500 copies were made. This release became available on the same day as the European release. A limited edition digipak came with a making-of DVD. In the documentary, it is stated that the band recorded 17 songs and used 12 for the album, and another three for the single. This makes two previously unknown songs that have not been released yet.

Before the album's release, In Flames launched a special fansite called jesterhead.com, which featured exclusive content from the band.

The album received a Parental Advisory label, making it the only In Flames album to have explicit lyrics since Lunar Strain. The artwork for the album cover was done by Alex Pardee, who has created all the cover art for The Used and Aiden's album Conviction. A Sense of Purpose is the first studio album since Clayman to feature the band's icon, the "Jester Head", on the cover art.

The lead single, "The Mirror's Truth", was officially released on 7 March 2008 and was featured in the video game Madden NFL 09. In Flames released two other singles from A Sense of Purpose: "Alias" and "Delight and Angers".

On 10 April the album debuted at number 1 on the official Swedish album chart and at number 28 on the American Billboard 200 albums chart. In 2009 the album went gold in Sweden.

== Reception ==
Professional ratings
Review scores
Source	Rating
About.com	link
Allmusic	link
Alternative Press	link at the Wayback Machine (archived 6 June 2009)
Blabbermouth.net	link
Chronicles of Chaos	link
Pitchfork Media	(7.0/10) link
PopMatters	link
Sputnikmusic	link

A Sense of Purpose has received generally positive reviews. Jason MacNeil of Allmusic gave the album a score of 4 stars out of 5, writing "In Flames continue to make their mark by being rooted in a strong metal or hard rock foundation but being musically and creatively inquisitive enough to seek out something more." Popmatters' Adrien Begrand wrote "If there’s one fault that can be found on A Sense of Purpose, it’s that its pace can get redundant upon first listen... plus it lacks the huge arena-appealing hooks that Come Clarity had in spades..." Begrand concluded: "However, like Reroute to Remain, the album benefits greatly from patient listening, making it a worthy addition to the catalog and continuing one of the more impressive second-decade rebirths we’ve seen from a metal band."

In a more negative review, Sputnikmusic's Adam Thomas wrote "...A Sense of Purpose shows getting rid of what was intrinsically In Flames, the harmonies. Now in their place are hackneyed synth passages and down tuned nu-metal style riffing. In an attempt to grab the attention of the fans of nu-metal's corpse, In Flames have stuck it to their old fans, again." Thomas concluded: "I'm sorry to say it, but In Flames are out of any worthwhile ideas. They even admit it in the opening track of the album, 'Without even trying' shrieks Anders on 'The Mirror's Truth'. At least he's being honest."

== Track listing ==
All tracks are written by Anders Fridén, Björn Gelotte and Jesper Strömblad.

No.	Title	Length
1.	"The Mirror's Truth"	3:02
2.	"Disconnected"	3:37
3.	"Sleepless Again"	4:12
4.	"Alias"	4:53
5.	"I'm the Highway"	3:46
6.	"Delight and Angers"	3:41
7.	"Move Through Me"	3:08
8.	"The Chosen Pessimist"	8:16
9.	"Sober and Irrelevant"	3:24
10.	"Condemned"	3:36
11.	"Drenched in Fear"	3:32
12.	"March to the Shore"	3:30
Total length:		47:59

Japanese, Tour Edition & Reissue bonus tracks
No.	Title	Length
13.	"Eraser (Note: Also featured on "The Mirror's Truth" single.)"	3:22
14.	"Tilt"	3:49
15.	"Abnegation"	3:43
Total length:		58:53

Korean remaster bonus tracks
No.	Title	Length
16.	"Alias [Laid Remix]"	6:24
Total length:		65:17

=== DVD ===
No.	Title	Length
1.	"Introductions (03. – 9 Sept.. Sept. 2007)"
2.	"The Boat Trip (10. – 16 Sept.. Sept. 2007)"
3.	"Drums, Drums Drums (17. – 23 Sept.. Sept 2007)"
4.	"Bass, Booze & Balls (24. – 30 Sept.. Sept 2007)"
5.	"Guitar Sweatshop (01. – 7 Oct. October 2007)"
6.	"Diggin' in the Dirt (08. – 14 Oct.. Oct. 2007)"
7.	"Are We There Yet? (15. – 21 Oct.. Oct. 2007)"
8.	"High Stakes (22. – 28 Oct.. Oct. 2007)"
9.	"Guitar Smorgasbord (29. – 4 Oct.. Nov. 2007)"
10.	"Rollin' (05. – 11 Nov. Nov. 2007)"
11.	"Bare to the Bone(s) (12. – 18 Nov.. Nov. 2007)"
12.	"This Is the End (19. – 30 Nov.. Nov. 2007)"

== Personnel ==
=== In Flames ===
- Anders Fridén – vocals
- Björn Gelotte – guitars
- Jesper Strömblad – guitars
- Peter Iwers – bass
- Daniel Svensson – drums

=== Additional personnel ===
- Recorded at IF Studios, Gothenburg, Sweden
- Produced by In Flames, Roberto Laghi, and Daniel Bergstrand
- Mixed by Toby Wright
- Assisted by James Musshorn at Skip Saylor Recordings, Los Angeles, California
- Mastered by Stephen Marcussen at Marcussen Mastering Studios, Hollywood, California
- Drum recording – Roberto Laghi
- Vocal recording – Daniel Bergstrand and Anders Fridén
- Bass recording – Roberto Laghi
- Guitar recording – Roberto Laghi, Björn Gelotte, and Jesper Strömblad
- Additional drum editing – Arnold Linberg
- Keys and programming – Örjan Örnkloo at Wasteland Studios
- Written by Anders Fridén, Björn Gelotte, Jesper Strömblad
- Arranged by In Flames
- All songs published by Kobalt Music
- Illustrations, art direction, and design by Alex Pardee

== Charts ==
=== Album ===
Chart (2008)	Peak position
Austrian Albums (Ö3 Austria)	6
Belgian Albums (Ultratop Flanders)	51
Belgian Albums (Ultratop Wallonia)	70
Danish Albums (Hitlisten)	39
Dutch Albums (Album Top 100)	70
Finnish Albums (Suomen virallinen lista)	3
French Albums (SNEP)	64
German Albums (Offizielle Top 100)	6
Japanese Albums (Oricon)	14
Norwegian Albums (VG-lista)	15
Scottish Albums (Official Charts)	49
Spanish Albums (Promusicae)	90
Swedish Albums (Sverigetopplistan)	1
Swiss Albums (Schweizer Hitparade)	29
UK Albums (Official Charts)	54
US Billboard 200	28

=== Singles ===
Year	Song	Peak positions			
Year	Song	SWE	AUT	FIN	GER
2008	"The Mirror's Truth"	14	51	5	72
2008	"Alias"	—	—	—	—
2009	"Delight and Angers"	—	—	—	—
"—" denotes releases that did not chart or were not released in that country.

== See also ==
- A Sense of Purpose Tour
