= All Ends =

Swedish rock band

- Origin: Gothenburg, Sweden
- Genres: Alternative metal, alternative rock, hard rock
- Years active: 2003–2016
- Labels: GUN Records/Sony BMG
- Spinoff of: In Flames
- Members: Joseph Skansås; Tinna Karlsdotter; Fredrik Johansson; Peter Mårdklint; Anders Janfalk; Jonna Sailon
- Past members: Björn Gelotte; Jesper Strömblad; Michael Håkansson; Emma Gelotte
- Website: www.allends.se

All Ends was a female-fronted duet alternative metal band from Gothenburg, Sweden. Founded in 2003, it started as a side project of the In Flames guitarists Björn Gelotte and Jesper Strömblad; alongside Tinna Karlsdotter, Joseph "Joey" Skansås, and Björn's sister Emma Gelotte. Currently, the band is on hiatus.

== History ==
With the initial line-up of Jesper Strömblad and Björn Gelotte handling bass and guitars, Joseph "Joey" Skansås playing drums as well as Emma Gelotte and Tinna Karlsdotter on vocal duties, they recorded a five-track demo. The demo was recorded at Studio Fredman and produced by Fredrik Nordström and Patrick J. Sten.

After the initial demo recording, numerous bassists supported the band, including Michael Håkansson.

In the spring of 2005, Fredrik Johansson (ex-Dimension Zero and guest lead guitarist on "December Flower" from the album The Jester Race by In Flames) took over guitar duties. There is a common misunderstanding with Fredrik based on a shared name with ex-rhythm guitarist of Dark Tranquillity, Fredrik Johansson, usually having either men incorrectly being credited to each of their own bands.

In August 2005, Peter Mårdklint joined the band as the second guitarist.

All Ends signed a worldwide contract with GUN Records, a division of Sony BMG Music Entertainment. On 11 May 2007, they released their five-track debut EP, Wasting Life.

On 7 November 2007, they released their self-titled debut album, which was later reissued with bonus tracks in September 2008.

All Ends also performed in the annual Sweden Rock Festival throughout its length, 6–9 June 2007, which again they shared the stage with numerous bassists.

In 2008, however, Anders Janfalk joined All Ends as their permanent bassist.

On 3 March 2009, video game company Sega released Sonic and the Black Knight. The game features a vocal song for the final boss battle called "With Me" which features vocals by Emma Gelotte, Tinna Karlsdotter, and Johnny Gioeli of Crush 40. The song (as well as its instrumental version) was released on the CD release, "Face to Faith", a compilation of all the vocal songs from Sonic and the Black Knight.

On 17 March 2009, vocalist Emma Gelotte quit the band for personal reasons. Swedish singer Jonna Sailon joined the band as the replacement vocalist.

News on their second album had started up on All Ends' MySpace page as of 23 October 2009. They stated they had completed the pre-production phase of their album and even had a new producer. Roberto Laghi, who previously helped In Flames record one of their albums, was helping All Ends with their second. It also stated on their MySpace page that they were looking to release their album in 2010.

On 11 January 2010, the band revealed two titles from the album "Nobody's Story" and "I'm a Monster".

Later that year on 6 July 2010, the band posted on Facebook that the release date for their second album A Road to Depression would be 15 October that same year.

After a quieter year, the band took to Facebook on 2 October 2012 and stated: "We are alive, guys. Just on a break to broaden life's views a little bit".

More recently in 2016, Björn Gelotte stated that the "project is essentially dead". No news of the band's return has been posted since.

== Members ==
Final lineup

- Joseph "Joey" Skansås – drums, songwriter, co-founder (2003–2016)
- Tinna Karlsdotter – vocals, songwriter, co-founder (2003–2016)
- Fredrik Johansson – guitars (2005–2016)
- Peter Mårdklint – guitars (2005–2016)
- Anders Janfalk – bass (2008–2016)
- Jonna Sailon – vocals (2009–2016)

Former members

- Björn Gelotte – songwriter, co-founder (2003–2016), guitars (2003–2005)
- Jesper Strömblad – songwriter, co-founder (2003–2016), bass (2003, 2003–2008), guitars (2003)
- Emma Gelotte – vocals, co-founder (2003–2009)
- Michael Håkansson – bass (2003)
- Christian Krull Grönlund – bass (live musician 2006/2007)

== Discography ==
=== Albums ===
- All Ends (2007)
- A Road to Depression (2010)

=== EPs ===
- Wasting Life (2007)

=== Singles ===
- Still Believe (2008)
- Apologize (2008)
- What Do You Want (2009)
- Generation Disgrace (2010)

== Music videos ==
- Wasting Life
- Still Believe
- Walk Away
- Pretty Words
- Apologize
- What Do You Want
- Generation Disgrace
- Road to Depression
