= This Is Hell (Dimension Zero album) =

Studio album by Dimension Zero
- Released: 4 November 2003
- Recorded: February, 2003
- Studio: Phlat Planet
- Genre: Melodic death metal
- Length: 36:24
- Label: Regain
- Producers: Anders Fridén, Dimension Zero

Dimension Zero chronology
Silent Night Fever (2002)	This Is Hell (2003)	He Who Shall Not Bleed (2007)

Professional ratings
Review scores
Source	Rating
AllMusic	3/5 stars
Chronicles of Chaos	8/10
Heavymetal.dk	8/10
Imperiumi	7.5/10
Metal.de	8/10
Metalitalia.com	6/10
Powermetal.de	Favourable
Rock Hard	8/10
Vampster	Favourable

This Is Hell is the second album by the Swedish melodic death metal band Dimension Zero.

Glenn Ljungström left after the recording and before the album's release; he did not appear in the music video for "Immaculate".

== Track listing ==
1. "The Introduction to What This Is" – 2:38
2. "Dimension Zero" – 2:53
3. "Immaculate" – 3:52
4. "Blood on the Streets" – 3:09
5. "Into and Out of Subsistence" – 3:09
6. "The Final Destination" – 4:50
7. "Amygdala" – 3:27
8. "Killing My Sleep" – 4:01
9. "This Light" – 4:28
10. "Di'i Minores" – 3:52
11. "Helmet" – 2:19 (bonus track for Japan/Korea)

== Personnel ==
- Jesper Strömblad – bass guitar, musical composition
- Glenn Ljungström – rhythm guitar, music
- Jocke Göthberg – vocals, lyrics
- Hans Nilsson – drums
- Daniel Antonsson – lead guitar, musical composition
