= A Sense of Purpose Tour =

2008–10 concert tour by In Flames

- Concert by In Flames
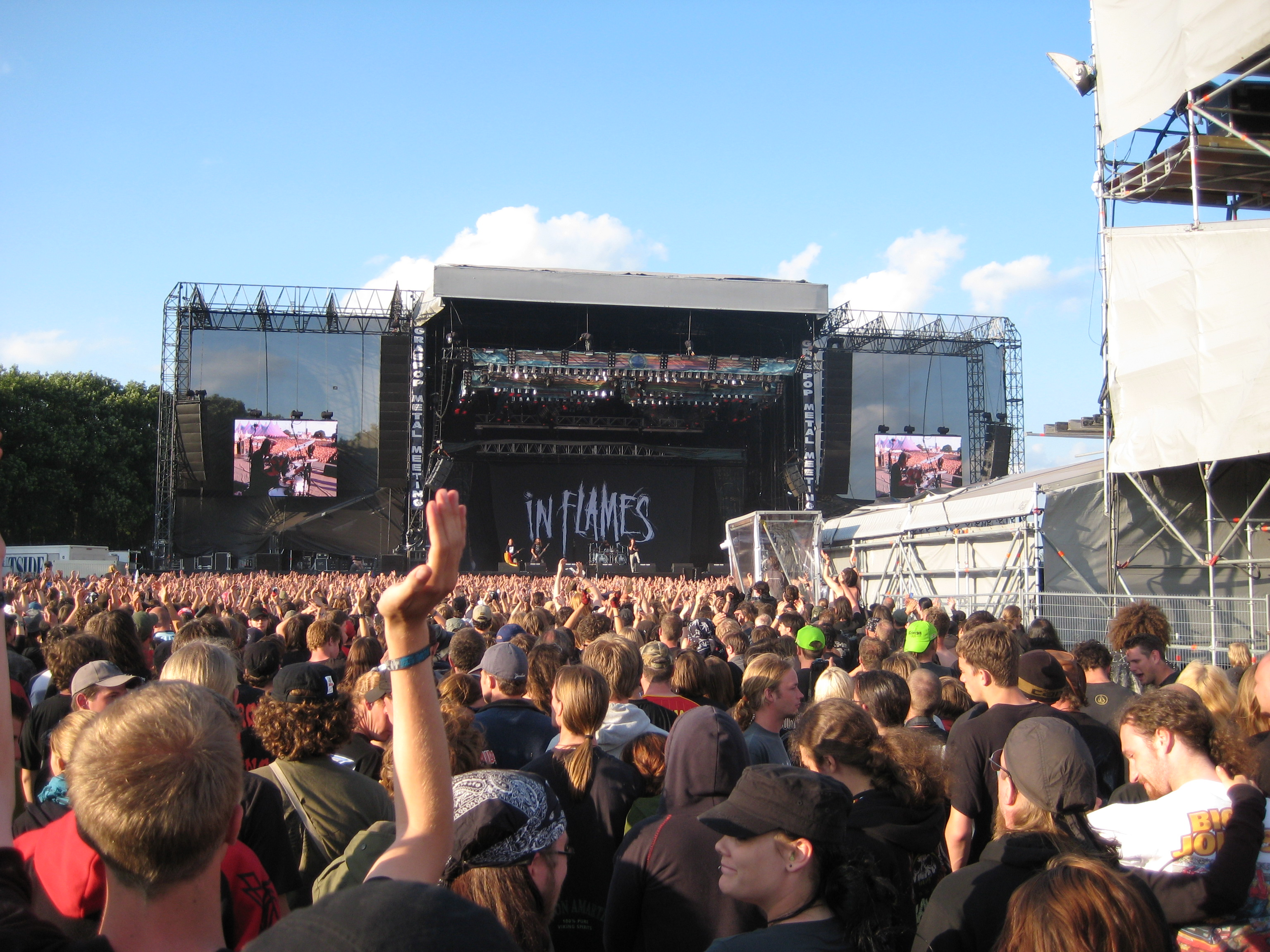
- In Flames performing at the Graspop Metal Meeting in Dessel, Belgium, on 29 June 2008
- Location: Asia, Europe, North America, Oceania, South America
- Associated album: A Sense of Purpose
- Start date: 12 April 2008
- End date: 29 January 2010
- Legs: 12
- No. of shows: 199 in total 91 in Europe; 89 in North America; 7 in Asia; 7 in Oceania; 5 in South America; 17 cancellations

In Flames concert chronology
- Come Clarity Tour (2006–2007); A Sense of Purpose Tour (2008–2010); Sounds of a Playground Fading Tour (2011–2012)

A Sense of Purpose Tour was a concert tour by Swedish heavy metal band In Flames in support of their ninth studio album, A Sense of Purpose, which was released in April 2008.

The tour began in May 2008 with a slot on Gigantour in North American markets, which was headlined by Megadeth. Following runs through Europe and a second North American leg, the tour continued through 2009 with the band's first visit to South America, as well as dates in Australia and Japan.

In February 2009, it was confirmed that lead guitarist Jesper Strömblad would be taking leave from future touring, due to his focus on alcohol rehabilitation. He was replaced with former member Niklas Engelin. Later in the month, an upcoming spring tour of the U.K. and Ireland was cancelled after it was announced that a second member, bassist Peter Iwers, would be taking leave due to the anticipated birth of his child. The band, minus Strömblad, fulfilled all touring commitments up to early April and resumed performing in the summer.

In September 2009, the band commenced a Canadian co-headlining trek with Killswitch Engage. Following the dates in Canada, the group toured the United States through early October.

In November 2009, the group teamed up once again with Killswitch Engage for the European leg of the "Taste of Chaos" tour. In January 2010, the band played their final leg of the tour, performing four dates in Asia.

== Tour dates ==
Date	City	Country	Venue
North America, Leg #1 ("Gigantour 2008")
12 April 2008	Denver	United States	Fillmore Auditorium
13 April 2008	Albuquerque	United States	Journal Pavilion
15 April 2008	Grand Prairie	United States	Nokia Theatre at Grand Prairie
16 April 2008	Corpus Christi	United States	Concrete Street Pavilion
17 April 2008	Houston	United States	Verizon Wireless Theater
18 April 2008 ^{[1]}	Little Rock	United States	The Village
19 April 2008	Louisville	United States	Louisville Gardens
20 April 2008	Atlanta	United States	Masquerade Music Park
22 April 2008	New York City	United States	Hammerstein Ballroom
23 April 2008	New York City	United States	Hammerstein Ballroom
24 April 2008 ^{[1]}	Philadelphia	United States	Electric Factory
25 April 2008	Worcester	United States	The Palladium
26 April 2008	Columbia	United States	Merriweather Post Pavilion
28 April 2008	Quebec City	Canada	Pavillon de la Jeunesse
29 April 2008	Montreal	Canada	Bell Centre
30 April 2008	Mississauga	Canada	Arrow Hall
1 May 2008	London	Canada	John Labatt Centre
2 May 2008 ^{[1]}	Columbus	United States	Newport Music Hall
3 May 2008	Clarkston	United States	DTE Energy Music Theatre
4 May 2008	Cleveland	United States	Time Warner Cable Amphitheater
6 May 2008	Chicago	United States	Aragon Ballroom
7 May 2008	Milwaukee	United States	Eagles Ballroom
8 May 2008 ^{[1]}	Omaha	United States	Sokol Auditorium
9 May 2008	Minneapolis	United States	Myth
10 May 2008	Winnipeg	Canada	Winnipeg Convention Centre
11 May 2008	Saskatoon	Canada	Prairieland Exhibition Hall
12 May 2008	Edmonton	Canada	Shaw Conference Centre
14 May 2008	Calgary	Canada	Stampede Corral
16 May 2008	Vancouver	Canada	Pacific Coliseum
17 May 2008	Salem	United States	Salem Armory Auditorium
19 May 2008	San Jose	United States	Event Center Arena
20 May 2008	San Diego	United States	Cox Arena
21 May 2008	Long Beach	United States	Long Beach Arena
22 May 2008	Mesa	United States	Mesa Amphitheatre
Europe, Leg #1
29 May 2008	Stockholm	Sweden	Gröna Lund
7 June 2008	Nürburgring	Germany	Rock am Ring Festival
8 June 2008	Nuremberg	Germany	Rock im Park Festival
13 June 2008	Interlaken	Switzerland	Greenfield Festival
14 June 2008	Nickelsdorf	Austria	Nova Rock Festival
15 June 2008	Donington Park	United Kingdom	Download Festival
20 June 2008	Clisson	France	Hellfest
21 June 2008	Kauhajoki	Finland	Nummirock Festival
26 June 2008	Borlänge	Sweden	Peace and Love Festival
27 June 2008	Arendal	Norway	Hove Festival
28 June 2008	Gothenburg	Sweden	Metaltown Festival
29 June 2008	Dessel	Belgium	Graspop Metal Meeting
4 July 2008	Tolmin	Slovenia	Metaldays
5 July 2008	Löbnitz	Germany	With Full Force
7 July 2008	Kavarna	Bulgaria	Kaliakra Rock Fest
18 July 2008	Vaasa	Finland	Rockperry Festival
1 August 2008	Lustenau	Austria	Szene Festival
Europe, Leg #2
27 September 2008	Glasgow	United Kingdom	Barrowlands
28 September 2008	Birmingham	United Kingdom	Carling Academy
29 September 2008	Manchester	United Kingdom	Manchester Academy
1 October 2008	London	United Kingdom	London Astoria
3 October 2008	Luxembourg	Luxembourg	Den Atelier
4 October 2008	Cologne	Germany	Palladium
5 October 2008	Wiesbaden	Germany	Schlachthof
7 October 2008	Brussels	Belgium	Ancienne Belgique
8 October 2008	Paris	France	Zénith de Paris
9 October 2008	Tilburg	Netherlands	013
10 October 2008	Nancy	France	L’Autre Canal
11 October 2008	Lyon	France	Transbordeur
13 October 2008	Barcelona	Spain	Razzmatazz
14 October 2008	Granada	Spain	La Copera
15 October 2008	Madrid	Spain	La Riviera
16 October 2008	Bilbao	Spain	Rock Star Live
18 October 2008	Fribourg	Switzerland	Fri-Son
19 October 2008	Munich	Germany	Zenith
20 October 2008	Vienna	Austria	Gasometer
21 October 2008	Milan	Italy	Alcatraz
22 October 2008	Zürich	Switzerland	Volkshaus
24 October 2008	Dresden	Germany	Alter Schlachthof
25 October 2008	Berlin	Germany	Columbiahalle
27 October 2008	Helsinki	Finland	Cable Factory
29 October 2008	Stockholm	Sweden	Annexet
30 October 2008	Stockholm	Sweden	Annexet
31 October 2008	Oslo	Norway	Sentrum Scene
1 November 2008	Gothenburg	Sweden	Lisebergshallen
2 November 2008	Gothenburg	Sweden	Lisebergshallen
North America, Leg #2
6 November 2008	Montreal	Canada	Metropolis
7 November 2008	Toronto	Canada	Sound Academy
8 November 2008	Mount Clemens	United States	Emerald Theatre
9 November 2008	Cleveland	United States	Agora Theatre
10 November 2008	Chicago	United States	House of Blues
12 November 2008	Minneapolis	United States	Myth
14 November 2008	Calgary	Canada	MacEwan Hall
15 November 2008	Edmonton	Canada	Event Centre
17 November 2008	Vancouver	Canada	Commodore Ballroom
18 November 2008	Seattle	United States	Showbox SoDo
19 November 2008	Portland	United States	Roseland Theater
21 November 2008	San Francisco	United States	The Warfield
22 November 2008	Los Angeles	United States	Club Nokia L.A. Live
23 November 2008	Las Vegas	United States	House of Blues
24 November 2008	Tempe	United States	Marquee Theatre
25 November 2008	Albuquerque	United States	Midnight Rodeo
26 November 2008	Denver	United States	Fillmore Auditorium
28 November 2008	Dallas	United States	Palladium Ballroom
29 November 2008	Austin	United States	La Zona Rosa
30 November 2008	Houston	United States	House of Blues
2 December 2008	Orlando	United States	Hard Rock Live
3 December 2008	Atlanta	United States	The Tabernacle
4 December 2008	Norfolk	United States	The NorVa
5 December 2008	Baltimore	United States	Rams Head Live!
6 December 2008	Worcester	United States	The Palladium
7 December 2008	New York City	United States	Terminal 5
9 December 2008	St. Louis	United States	The Pageant
10 December 2008	Milwaukee	United States	The Rave
7 February 2009	Monterrey	Mexico	Café Iguana
8 February 2009	Mexico City	Mexico	Circo Volador
South America
10 February 2009	Bogotá	Colombia	Teatro Metro
12 February 2009	Santiago	Chile	Blondie Club
13 February 2009	Buenos Aires	Argentina	El Teatro Flores
14 February 2009	Buenos Aires	Argentina	El Teatro Flores
15 February 2009	São Paulo	Brazil	Espaço Lux
Australia ("Soundwave Festival")
21 February 2009	Brisbane	Australia	Brisbane Exhibition Ground
22 February 2009	Sydney	Australia	Eastern Creek Raceway
23 February 2009 ^{[2]}	Sydney	Australia	The Forum
24 February 2009 ^{[2]}	Melbourne	Australia	Billboard The Venue
27 February 2009	Melbourne	Australia	Royal Melbourne Showgrounds
28 February 2009	Adelaide	Australia	Bonython Park
2 March 2009	Perth	Australia	Steel Blue Oval
Asia, Leg #1
4 March 2009 ^{[3]}	Tokyo	Japan	Akasaka Blitz
5 March 2009 ^{[3]}	Tokyo	Japan	Akasaka Blitz
6 March 2009 ^{[3]}	Osaka	Japan	Namba Hatch
Europe, Leg #3
25 March 2009	Zagreb	Croatia	Tvornica Club
26 March 2009	Vienna	Austria	Arena
27 March 2009	Ljubljana	Slovenia	Gospodarsko Razstavisce
28 March 2009	Belgrade	Serbia	SKC
29 March 2009	Sofia	Bulgaria	Denitza Hall
30 March 2009	Bucharest	Romania	Arenele Romane
1 April 2009	Budapest	Hungary	Petőfi Csarnok
2 April 2009	Košice	Slovakia	Jumbo Hall
3 April 2009	Zlín	Czech Republic	Monsters of Rock Café
4 April 2009	Prague	Czech Republic	Folimanka
6 April 2009	Warsaw	Poland	Progresja Klub
25 April 2009	Sälen	Sweden	Högis
Europe, Leg #4
5 June 2009	Sölvesborg	Sweden	Sweden Rock Festival
20 June 2009	Bilbao	Spain	Kobetasonik Festival
4 July 2009	Turku	Finland	Ruisrock
9 July 2009	Kvinesdal	Norway	Norway Rock Festival
31 July 2009	Wacken	Germany	Open Air Festival
North America, Leg #3
8 September 2009 ^{[4]}	Montreal	Canada	CEPSUM
9 September 2009 ^{[4]}	Mississauga	Canada	Arrow Hall
11 September 2009 ^{[4]}	Thunder Bay	Canada	Thunder Bay Community Auditorium
12 September 2009 ^{[4]}	Winnipeg	Canada	Convention Centre
13 September 2009 ^{[4]}	Saskatoon	Canada	Prairieland Exhibition Hall
14 September 2009 ^{[4]}	Calgary	Canada	Big Four Building
15 September 2009 ^{[4]}	Edmonton	Canada	Shaw Conference Centre
17 September 2009 ^{[4]}	Vancouver	Canada	Pacific Coliseum
18 September 2009	Spokane	United States	Knitting Factory
19 September 2009	Boise	United States	Knitting Factory
20 September 2009	Reno	United States	New Oasis
21 September 2009	San Francisco	United States	Regency Ballroom
22 September 2009	Pomona	United States	Pomona Fox Theater
23 September 2009	Tucson	United States	Rialto Theatre
25 September 2009	Corpus Christi	United States	Concrete Street Amphitheater
26 September 2009	San Antonio	United States	White Rabbit
27 September 2009	New Orleans	United States	House of Blues
29 September 2009	Knoxville	United States	The Valarium
30 September 2009	Louisville	United States	Expo Five
1 October 2009	Pittsburgh	United States	Mr. Small's Theatre
2 October 2009	Sayreville	United States	Starland Ballroom
3 October 2009	Boston	United States	House of Blues
4 October 2009	Philadelphia	United States	Trocadero Theatre
5 October 2009	Washington, D.C.	United States	9:30 Club
6 October 2009	Charlotte	United States	Amos' Southend
Europe, Leg #5
31 October 2009	Kyiv	Ukraine	CCM NAU
1 November 2009	Minsk	Belarus	Ledovy Dvorets
5 November 2009	Krasnodar	Russia	Premiera Club
7 November 2009	Saint Petersburg	Russia	Glav Club
8 November 2009	Moscow	Russia	DK Gorbunova
16 November 2009	Amsterdam	Netherlands	Melkweg
18 November 2009	Zürich	Switzerland	Volkshaus
19 November 2009	Trezzo	Italy	Live Club
20 November 2009	Strasbourg	France	La Laiterie
22 November 2009	Lille	France	Aeronef
23 November 2009	Luxembourg	Luxembourg	Den Atelier
24 November 2009	Paris	France	Bataclan
27 November 2009 ^{[5]}	Glasgow	United Kingdom	O_{2} Academy
28 November 2009 ^{[5]}	Bristol	United Kingdom	O_{2} Academy
30 November 2009 ^{[5]}	Newcastle	United Kingdom	O_{2} Academy
1 December 2009 ^{[5]}	Birmingham	United Kingdom	O_{2} Academy
2 December 2009 ^{[5]}	Manchester	United Kingdom	Academy
3 December 2009 ^{[5]}	London	United Kingdom	Hammersmith Apollo
4 December 2009 ^{[5]}	Antwerp	Belgium	Trix Hall
6 December 2009 ^{[5]}	Berlin	Germany	Columbiahalle
7 December 2009 ^{[5]}	Wiesbaden	Germany	Rhein-Main Halle
8 December 2009 ^{[5]}	Munich	Germany	Zenith
9 December 2009 ^{[5]}	Oberhausen	Germany	Turbinehalle
11 December 2009 ^{[5]}	Stockholm	Sweden	Hovet
12 December 2009 ^{[5]}	Gothenburg	Sweden	Scandinavium
13 December 2009 ^{[5]}	Oslo	Norway	Oslo Spektrum
14 December 2009 ^{[5]}	Malmö	Sweden	Malmö Arena
16 December 2009 ^{[5]}	Helsinki	Finland	Helsinki Ice Hall
Asia, Leg #2
22 January 2010	Tokyo	Japan	Zepp
24 January 2010	Osaka	Japan	Namba Hatch
27 January 2010	Beijing	China	Star Live House
29 January 2010	Taipei	Taiwan	Liberty Square

- 1 Headline show; non-Gigantour appearance.
- 2 Date supporting Lamb of God.
- 3 Date featuring co-headliners Lamb of God.
- 4 Date featuring co-headliners Killswitch Engage (Killswitch Engage played last in Mississauga, Thunder Bay, Winnipeg and Edmonton).
- 5 Date part of the "Taste of Chaos" tour featuring co-headliners Killswitch Engage (Killswitch Engage played last on all U.K. dates).

Cancelled dates

12 July 2008	Milan, Italy	Evolution Festival	Performance cancelled due to extreme rain and bad weather.
15 April 2009	Norwich, United Kingdom	The Waterfront	Date cancelled.
16 April 2009	Colchester, United Kingdom	Arts Centre	Date cancelled.
17 April 2009	Brighton, United Kingdom	Concorde 2	Date cancelled.
18 April 2009	Oxford, United Kingdom	O_{2} Academy	Date cancelled.
19 April 2009	Leeds, United Kingdom	The Cockpit	Date cancelled.
21 April 2009	Newcastle, United Kingdom	O_{2} Academy	Date cancelled.
22 April 2009	Dundee, United Kingdom	Fat Sams	Date cancelled.
23 April 2009	Belfast, United Kingdom	Mandela Hall	Date cancelled.
24 April 2009	Dublin, Ireland	The Academy	Date cancelled.
25 April 2009	Cork, Ireland	The Pavilion	Date cancelled.
27 April 2009	Exeter, United Kingdom	Lemon Grove	Date cancelled.
28 April 2009	Cardiff, United Kingdom	University Solus	Date cancelled.
29 April 2009	Cambridge, United Kingdom	The Junction	Date cancelled.
30 April 2009	Sheffield, United Kingdom	Corporation	Date cancelled.
1 May 2009	Liverpool, United Kingdom	O_{2} Academy	Date cancelled.
2 May 2009	Northampton, United Kingdom	Roadmender	Date cancelled.

== Support acts ==
- 3 Inches of Blood (18 September – 6 October 2009)
- 36 Crazyfists (6 November – 10 December 2008)
- All That Remains (6 November – 10 December 2008)
- Between the Buried and Me (8 September – 6 October 2009)
- Dead by April (11–16 December 2009)
- Every Time I Die (27 November – 16 December 2009)
- The Faceless (18 September – 6 October 2009)
- Gojira (27 September – 2 November 2008; 6 November – 10 December 2008)
- Heaven Shall Burn (6–9 December 2009)
- Maylene and the Sons of Disaster (27 November – 16 December 2009)
- Inexist (5–8 November 2009)
- Protest the Hero (8–17 September 2009)
- Sonic Syndicate (27 September – 2 November 2008)
- Sybreed (16–24 November 2009)
- Unearth (4–6 March 2009)
