= Black-Ash Inheritance =

EP by In Flames
- Released: 15 August 1997
- Genre: Melodic death metal
- Length: 14:34
- Label: Nuclear Blast
- Producer: Fredrik Nordström

In Flames chronology
The Jester Race (1996)	Black-Ash Inheritance (1997)	Whoracle (1997)

Professional ratings
Review scores
Source	Rating
Allmusic	4/5 stars

Black-Ash Inheritance is the second EP by Swedish heavy metal band In Flames, released in 1997. It was released as a preview of their upcoming album Whoracle. Its tracks were later included in the Japanese release of Whoracle as well as the later reissue of The Jester Race.

The title is a lyric from the song "Dead God in Me" from The Jester Race.

The "Acoustic Medley" is a medley of three In Flames songs; "Artifacts of the Black Rain" (The Jester Race), "Dead Eternity" (The Jester Race) and "Jotun" (Whoracle).

In 2007, Black-Ash Inheritance was re-released as a shaped mini-LP by Night of the Vinyl Dead Records, limited to 555 copies.

== Track listing ==
No.	Title	Music	Length
1.	"Goliaths Disarm Their Davids"	Ljungström, Strömblad, Gelotte	4:54
2.	"Gyroscope"	Strömblad	3:26
3.	"Acoustic Medley" (instrumental)	Strömblad	2:32
4.	"Behind Space" (live)	Ljungström, Strömblad	3:36
Total length:			14:28

== Personnel ==
=== In Flames ===
- Anders Fridén – vocals, percussion
- Glenn Ljungström – guitars
- Jesper Strömblad – guitars, keyboards, percussion
- Johan Larsson – bass
- Bjorn Gelotte – drums, percussion
