= Colony (album) =

Studio album by In Flames
- Released: 21 May 1999 (Japan); 31 May 1999 (international)
- Recorded: November 1998
- Studio: Studio Fredman, Gothenburg, Sweden
- Genre: Melodic death metal
- Length: 41:31
- Label: Nuclear Blast
- Producer: Fredrik Nordström and In Flames

In Flames chronology
Whoracle (1997)	Colony (1999)	Clayman (2000)

Professional ratings
Review scores
Source	Rating
AllMusic	3.5/5 stars
Metal Storm	9.4/10
Sputnikmusic	4.5/5 stars

Colony is the fourth studio album by Swedish heavy metal band In Flames, released on 21 May 1999 via Nuclear Blast Records.

It is the first In Flames album to feature the band's classic line-up; Björn Gelotte switched to lead guitar, to replace Glenn Ljungström, and Daniel Svensson filled the drummer position left vacant by Gelotte. Peter Iwers became the new bass player, replacing Johan Larsson. With Anders Fridén and Jesper Strömblad remaining on vocals and rhythm guitar respectively, this lineup remained unchanged until 2010.

In 2021, it was named one of the 20 best metal albums of 1999 by Metal Hammer magazine.

== Music ==
=== Lyrics and musical style ===
The album deals with various aspects of religion, society, and spirituality, from the somewhat positive light of "Embody the Invisible" and "The New Word", to the more negative "Zombie Inc." and "Scorn". Colony features a faster, tighter, and more energetic approach to the music than displayed on the previous album, Whoracle, though the songwriting approach is similar.

=== Songs ===
The title of the song "The New Word" is subject to debate. According to the track list on the back cover of the original 1999 release, the official In Flames web site, and the lyrics printed in the original 1999 CD booklet, the correct title is "The New Word"; however, according to the heading of the lyrics printed for the song in the original booklet, the track list on the 2004 re-release, and the official Nuclear Blast Records website, the song is called "The New World". The 2009 re-release Colony: Reloaded did nothing to clear up this issue, with the insert and the booklet containing the same inconsistency as the original 1999 release. The song's lyrics themselves, meanwhile, suggest that "The New Word" is indeed the correct title.

"Pallar Anders Visa" is a cover of the Swedish folk song "Pallars-Anders visa" which can be roughly translated as "song of Anders the thief". It is an instrumental, just like the bonus track "Man Made God". Guitarist Björn Gelotte talked about it in an interview:

It's an old Swedish traditional song. Really old. "Pallar Anders" is a name, but it means "Anders, the guy who steals apples" and it's his song. I don't know how to translate it.

The song "Embody the Invisible" appears in the soundtrack for the 2003 video game Tony Hawk's Underground.

The tracks "Behind Space '99" and "Clad in Shadows '99" are both remakes of the tracks first heard on Lunar Strain, although "Behind Space '99" excludes the acoustic guitar outro present on the original version.

This would be the first time the band would down tune their guitars from C standard on previous album with "Ordinary Story" and "Colony" being tuned to drop A#, something they would continue on future albums.

== Track listing ==
All lyrics are written by Anders Fridén, except where noted; all music is composed by Jesper Strömblad, except where noted.

No.	Title	Music	Length
1.	"Embody the Invisible"		3:37
2.	"Ordinary Story"		4:16
3.	"Scorn"	Björn Gelotte, Strömblad	3:37
4.	"Colony"		4:39
5.	"Zombie Inc."		5:05
6.	"Pallar Anders Visa" (instrumental)		1:41
7.	"Coerced Coexistence"		4:14
8.	"Resin"		3:21
9.	"Behind Space '99"		3:58
10.	"Insipid 2000"		3:45
11.	"The New Word"	Gelotte, Strömblad	3:18
Total length:			41:31

Japanese edition
No.	Title	Lyrics	Music	Length
12.	"Clad in Shadows '99"	Mikael Stanne	Glenn Ljungström, Strömblad	2:24
13.	"Man Made God" (instrumental)			4:11
Total length:				48:06

=== Deluxe edition (2004) ===
Contains the following, in addition to the standard track listing along with the instrumental "Man Made God":

- Photo gallery
- Ordinary Story music video (directed by Tamara Jordan)
- Computer wallpapers
- A screensaver
- Winamp skins
- Song lyrics (contains numerous spelling errors)

=== Colony: Reloaded (2009) ===
The enhanced re-release contains the same bonus content as the 2004 deluxe edition. The original 1999 cover is brought back, and the back insert is custom-shaped to fit into the "Super Jewel Box" case that is used.

== Credits ==
=== In Flames ===
- Anders Fridén – vocals
- Björn Gelotte – guitar
- Jesper Strömblad – guitar, hammond organ
- Peter Iwers – bass
- Daniel Svensson – drums

=== Additional personnel ===
- In Flames – arrangements, engineering, mixing
  - Jesper Strömblad – all music
  - Björn Gelotte – co-composition (1–8, 10, 11, 13)
  - Anders Fridén – lyrics (1–5, 7, 8, 10, 11)
- Prophecies Publishing – publishing
- Niklas Sundin – translation
- Fredrik Nordström – hammond organ, slide guitar, engineering and mixing
- Mikael Stanne – lyrics ("Behind Space '99" & "Clad in Shadows '99")
- Glenn Ljungström – co-composition ("Behind Space '99" & "Clad in Shadows '99")
- Kee Marcello – second guitar solo ("Coerced Coexistence")
- Peter Wildoer – drum technician
- Charlie Storm – programming
- Göran Finnberg – mastering
- Andreas Marschall – front cover illustration
- Flea Back – art direction
