= Subterranean (EP) =

EP by In Flames
- Released: 15 June 1995
- Recorded: 1994
- Studio: Studio Fredman (Gothenburg, Sweden)
- Genre: Melodic death metal
- Length: 20:50
- Label: Wrong Again
- Producer: In Flames

In Flames chronology
Lunar Strain (1994)	Subterranean (1995)	The Jester Race (1996)

Subterranean is the first EP by Swedish heavy metal band In Flames, released in 1995. It was remastered and re-released in 2003 by Regain Records and reissued again in 2014, featuring additional tracks. The song "The Inborn Lifeless" is also featured on the album The Jester Race, but with a different name ("Dead God in Me"), different lyrics, an alternate ending, and a different solo. Although drummer Daniel Erlandsson is pictured with the band through certain parts of the EP, he was only a guest, and did not perform on all of the recording.

== Track listing ==
No.	Title	Length
1.	"Stand Ablaze"	4:33
2.	"Everdying"	4:23
3.	"Subterranean"	5:46
4.	"Timeless" (instrumental)	1:46
5.	"Biosphere"	5:07

2003 reissue
No.	Title	Length
6.	"Dead Eternity"	5:01
7.	"The Inborn Lifeless"	3:23
8.	"Eye of the Beholder" (Metallica cover)	5:32
9.	"Murders in the Rue Morgue" (Iron Maiden cover, vocals by Anders Fridén)	3:07

== Personnel ==
In Flames

- Henke Forss – lead vocals
- Glenn Ljungström – guitars
- Jesper Strömblad – guitars, keyboards
- Johann Larsson – bass, backing vocals

Guests

- Anders Fridén – vocals on "Murders in the Rue Morgue"
- Jocke Götberg – vocals on "Dead Eternity"
- Per Gyllenbäck – vocals on "The Inborn Lifeless"
- Robert Dahne – vocals on "Eye of the Beholder"
- Oscar Dronjak – backing vocals on "Stand Ablaze"
- Daniel Erlandsson – drums on tracks 1, 2, 6–9
- Anders Jivarp – drums on tracks 3, 5

Other

- Fredrik Nordström – engineering
- Staffan Olofsson – mastering
- Kenneth Johansson – cover art and photos
- Henke Forss – lyrics
