= Glory to the Brave =

Studio album by HammerFall
- Released: 27 June 1997
- Recorded: February–April 1997, Studio Fredman, Gothenburg, Sweden
- Genre: Power metal, heavy metal
- Length: 44:26
- Label: Nuclear Blast
- Producer: Fredrik Nordström

HammerFall chronology
Glory to the Brave (1997)	Legacy of Kings (1998)

Singles from Glory to the Brave
- 1. "Glory to the Brave" Released: 20 October 1997

Glory to the Brave is the debut studio album by Swedish power metal band HammerFall, released in 1997. Despite the fact that the band was formed in 1993, HammerFall performed mostly live music and covers before this album was released. "Steel Meets Steel" was composed by Oscar Dronjak just before the band was formed and is included on this album. The band signed a deal with the Dutch label Vic Records. Nuclear Blast approached Vic Records and obtained a license deal for the album. Later, Nuclear Blast bought the entire rights from Vic Records. Although the In Flames guitarist Jesper Strömblad was listed as the drummer, all the drums were actually played by session musician Patrik Räfling, who joined the band as a full-time member shortly after the album's release.

The cover art was painted by Andreas Marschall.

"I Believe" was co-written with Peter Stålfors of Pure X and, later, the more famous Dream Evil.

== Composition ==
The band explained that the lyrics of "Glory to the Brave" are a tribute to long lost friends who died too early. "Even though they are not around anymore, they have a place in my heart forever." The dedication to Klas Fors, is to Joacim's grandfather, who died before the recording.

== Release ==
The single "Glory to the Brave" was released on 20 October 1997. The cover photo for the single was made by Richard Jakobsen.

The album Glory to the Brave was re-released in 2002 as a deluxe edition with the Stormwitch cover "Ravenlord" as a bonus track as well as a multimedia section including a music video.

== Critical reception ==
Professional ratings
Review scores
Source	Rating
AllMusic	4/5 stars
Rock Hard	10/10

In 2005, Glory to the Brave was ranked number 295 in Rock Hard magazine's book of The 500 Greatest Rock & Metal Albums of All Time. In 2020, it was named one of the 20 best metal albums of 1997 by Metal Hammer magazine.

== Track listing ==
No.	Title	Writer(s)	Length
1.	"The Dragon Lies Bleeding"	Jesper Strömblad, Joacim Cans, Oscar Dronjak	4:22
2.	"The Metal Age"	Dronjak, Strömblad, Cans	4:28
3.	"HammerFall"	Dronjak, Strömblad, Cans	4:47
4.	"I Believe"	Cans, Peter Stålfors	4:53
5.	"Child of the Damned" (Warlord cover)	Tsamis, Zonder	3:42
6.	"Steel Meets Steel"	Dronjak	4:02
7.	"Stone Cold"	Dronjak, Strömblad, Cans	5:43
8.	"Unchained"	Dronjak, Strömblad, Cans	5:38
9.	"Glory to the Brave"	Dronjak, Strömblad, Cans	7:20
Total length:			44:26

Bonus track

No.	Title	Writer(s)	Length
10.	"Ravenlord" (Stormwitch cover)	Lee Tarot	3:31
Total length:			47:57

== Personnel ==
- Joacim Cans – lead vocals, background harmonies
- Oscar Dronjak – guitars, backing vocals
- Fredrik Larsson – bass, backing vocals
- Glenn Ljungström – guitars
- Jesper Strömblad – drums (writing credit only)
- Patrik Räfling – drums
