= Silent Night Fever =

Studio album by Dimension Zero
- Released: 18 March 2002
- Genres: Death metal, thrash metal
- Length: 31:34
- Labels: Regain, Century Media
- Producer: Anders Fridén

Dimension Zero chronology
Penetrations from the Lost World (1997)	Silent Night Fever (2002)	This Is Hell (2003)

Silent Night Fever is the first full-length album by the Swedish death metal band Dimension Zero. It was released in 2002 by Regain Records and Century Media Records.

== Reception ==
Musically, Silent Night Fever was a mix between Swedish death metal and Teutonic thrash metal, interpreted as a device that allowed Jesper Strömblad and Glenn Ljungström to play "a bit more aggressive", "heavier and harder" than they did in In Flames. Exclaim! compared Dimension Zero to The Haunted, but found the album largely forgettable. Metalitalia.com stated that "we're obviously not dealing with a masterpiece", but gave a good 7.5 rating.

Sonic Seducer were positive, finding that Dimension Zero managed to "break free from familiar patterns and captivate with atmospheric mid-tempo sections". AllMusic gave 4 stars, calling Silent Night Fever "one of the better Swedish death metal releases of 2002". Chronicles of Chaos even gave a perfect 10 score, calling the record "flawless" and a "milestone in the Gothenburg death metal landscapes". Rock Hard followed suit with 9.5 out of 10. Powermetal.de found it to be an instant favourite, and Metal.de found it deserving of 9 points.

== Track listing ==
1. "Silent Night Fever" – 3:20
2. "The Murder-Inn" – 3:01
3. "Through the Virgin Sky" – 4:29
4. "Your Darkest Hour" – 4:08
5. "Not Even Dead" – 3:59
6. "They Are Waiting to Take Us" – 3:50
7. "Until You Die" – 3:45
8. "End" – 2:58
9. "Slow Silence" – 2:04
