= Diabolique =

Diabolique may refer to:

- Diabolique (1955 film), or Les Diaboliques, 1955 French film starring Simone Signoret
- Diabolique (1996 film), 1996 United States remake of Les Diaboliques starring Sharon Stone
- Diabolique (band), a Swedish gothic metal band
- Diabolique (porn star)

== See also ==
- Diabolik, Italian comic character
