= The Book of Truth =

Studio album by Ceremonial Oath
- Released: 1993
- Recorded: September 1992, Studio Fredman, Gothenburg, Sweden
- Genre: Death metal
- Length: 45:38
- Language: English
- Label: Modern Primitive Records
- Producers: Ceremonial Oath and Fredrik Nordström

Ceremonial Oath chronology
Lost Name of God (1992)	The Book of Truth (1993)	Carpet (1995)

Professional ratings
Review scores
Source	Rating
Eternal Terror	5.5/6
Metal Temple	8/10

The Book of Truth is the debut studio album by Swedish death metal band Ceremonial Oath. The album was released in 1993 through Modern Primitive Records.

The album was re-issued in 2013 for its 20th anniversary.

== Track listing ==
1. "Prologue: Sworn to Avenge" – 1:04
2. "Chapter I: The Invocator" – 3:16
3. "Chapter II: For I Have Sinned - The Praise" – 5:24
4. "Chapter III: Enthroned" – 5:16
5. "Chapter IV: Only Evil Prevails" – 5:30
6. "Chapter V: Thunderworld" – 2:26
7. "Chapter VI: Lords of Twilight" – 5:42
8. "Chapter VII: Ceremonial Oath" – 7:34
9. "Chapter VIII: The Lost Name of God" – 3:52
10. "Chapter IX: The Book of Truth" – 1:51
11. "Chapter X: Hellbound" – 3:40

== Credits ==
Ceremonial Oath

- Oscar Dronjak - vocals, guitar
- Anders Iwers - guitar
- Jesper Strömblad - bass guitar
- Markus Nordsberg - drums, percussion
