= Dimension Zero =

Swedish melodic death metal band

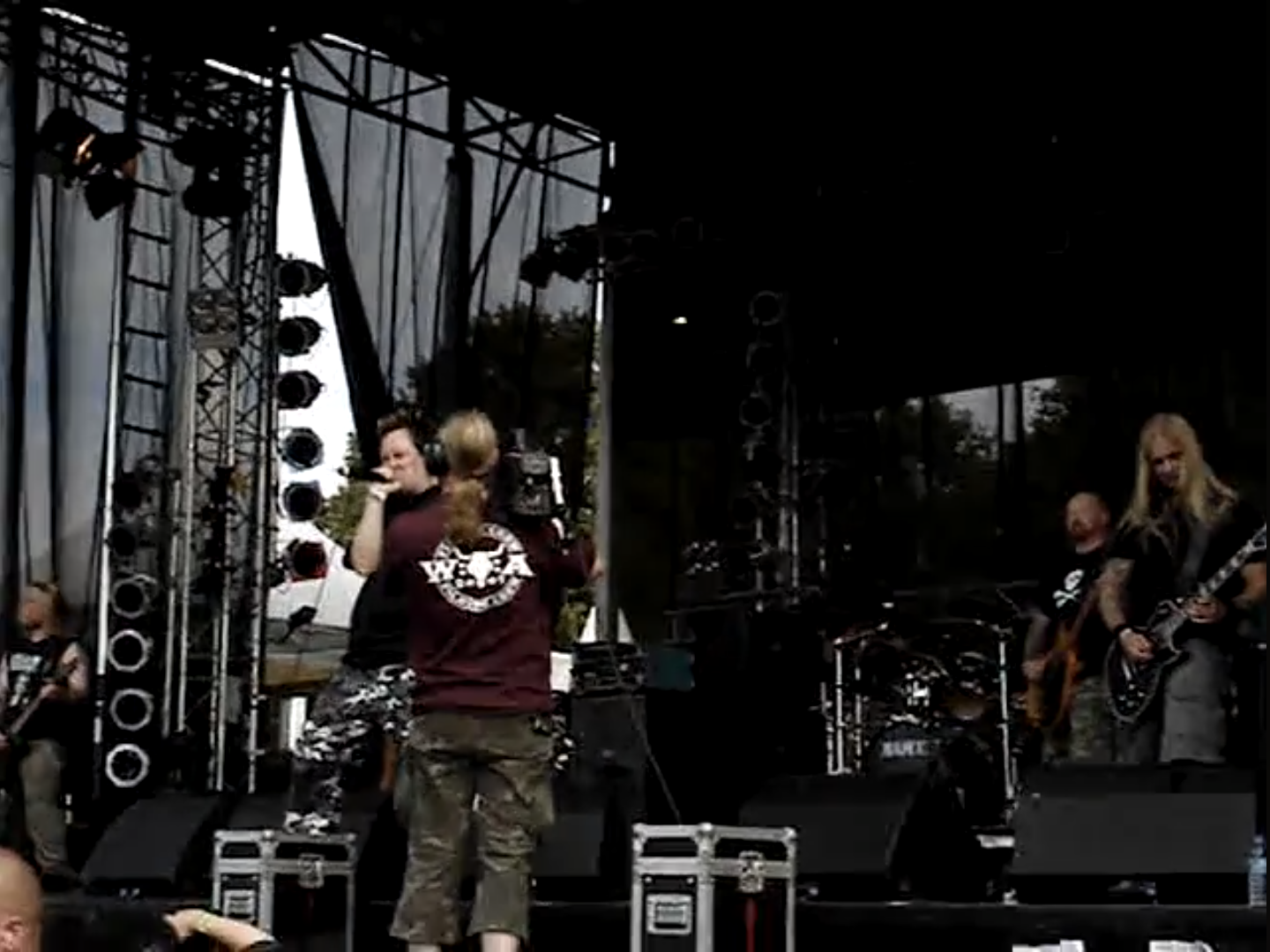
- Dimension Zero performing in 2007

Background information
- Origin: Gothenburg, Sweden
- Genre: Melodic death metal
- Years active: 1995–1998, 2000–2008, 2013–present
- Label: Vic Records
- Members: Jesper Strömblad; Hans Nilsson; Andreas Solveström
- Past members: Glenn Ljungström; Fredrik Johansson; Joakim Göthberg; Daniel Antonsson
- Website: dimensionzero.se

Dimension Zero is a melodic death metal band based in Gothenburg, Sweden. It was formed in 1995 as a side project by then In Flames guitarists Jesper Strömblad and Glenn Ljungström. Former Marduk drummer and vocalist Joakim Göthberg joined later on vocals, as well as Hans Nilsson (ex-Liers in Wait, Diabolique, Crystal Age) on drums.

The band released Penetrations from the Lost World in 1997 before splitting up the following year. They reformed in 2000, and recorded Silent Night Fever and This Is Hell. Tours have been rare due to the members' other musical commitments.

They have been described as old-school Swedish death metal in the range of At the Gates, Unleashed and Defleshed. Because of In Flames' lead guitarist's involvement in Dimension Zero, their albums have drawn critical comparisons with some of In Flames' earlier work. Their latest album, He Who Shall Not Bleed, was released in 2007.

In May 2014, it was announced that the band would reunite for the Gothenburg Sound Festival, set to take place in January 2015. In November 2014, a video message from vocalist Jocke on Gothenburg Sound's official Facobook page announced that Dimension Zero had cancelled due to "family circumstances" and was replaced with Strömblad's new band, The Resistance. The band was slated to instead reunite for Gothenburg Sound 2016.

In March 2016, Strömblad announced that Jocke Gothberg and Daniel Antonsson had left Dimension Zero. Gothberg's replacement was later announced as Andy Solveström, formerly of Amaranthe.

== Band members ==
Current members

- Jesper Strömblad − bass, guitars (1995–1998, 2000–2008, 2014–present)
- Hans Nilsson − drums (1995–1998, 2000–2008, 2014–present)
- Andreas "Andy" Solveström – vocals (2016–present)

Former members

- Glenn Ljungström − guitars (1995–1998, 2000–2003, 2005)
- Fredrik Johansson − guitars (1996–1998)
- Jocke Göthberg − vocals (1995–1998, 2000–2008, 2014–2016)
- Daniel Antonsson – guitars, bass (2002–2008, 2014–2016)

Former session members

- Niclas Andersson − session live bass (2007)

Timeline

== Discography ==
- Penetrations from the Lost World (1997), War Music − EP
- Silent Night Fever (2002), Regain − full-length
- This Is Hell (2003), Regain − full-length
- He Who Shall Not Bleed (2007), Vic Records − full-length
