= The Resistance (Swedish band) =

Swedish death metal band

- Origin: Gothenburg/Stockholm, Sweden
- Genres: Death metal
- Years active: 2011–2016 (on hiatus)
- Label: earMUSIC
- Members: Christofer Barkensjö; Daniel Antonsson; Marco Aro; Rob Hakemo
- Past members: Alex Losbäck Holstad; Claudio Oyarzo; Glenn Ljungström; Jesper Strömblad

The Resistance was a Swedish death metal band formed in 2011 by former members of In Flames, Grave, and The Haunted. Their music is described as old-school death metal with the aggressive elements of 1980s thrash and hardcore.

The band had problems getting a label, despite the members' successful work in their earlier projects. In an interview with Close Up, they stated that the labels were unwilling to sign the band without getting hand on an actual recording. The first full-length album named Scars was released in 2013. "It makes you want to kick in someone's forehead when listening to the album", according to Jesper Strömblad, the band's guitarist. The first planned album was cancelled, since the band members were not satisfied with the result. No official announcement has been made regarding the status of the band since the release of their 2016 album Coup de Grâce.

== Discography ==
Studio albums

- Scars (2013)
- Coup de Grâce (2016)

EPs

- Rise from Treason (2013)
- Torture Tactics (2015)

== Line-up ==
=== Final line-up ===
- Marco Aro – vocals (2011–2016)
- Jesper Strömblad – guitars (2011–2016)
- Christofer Barkensjö – drums (2011–2016)
- Rob Hakemo – bass (2014–2016)
- Daniel Antonsson – guitars (2015–2016)

=== Former members ===
- Glenn Ljungström – guitars (2011–2015)
- Alex Losbäck Holstad – bass (2011–2012)
- Claudio Oyarzo – bass (2013–2014, live 2012–2013)
