= Anthelion (band) =

Taiwanese symphonic black metal band

- Born: Taiwan
- Years active: 2001–present

Chinese name
- Traditional Chinese: 幻日
Transcriptions
- Musical career
- Genres: Symphonic black metal
- Labels: Independent
- Members: Code; Zeist; Siniz; Troy
- Past members: See: Former

Anthelion are a Taiwanese symphonic black metal band. The current members are Code, Zeist, Troy and Siniz.

== Biography ==
=== Beginning (2001-2004) ===
Anthelion was founded by members Code, Zeist, Troy and Jin in Keelung, Taiwan in 2001. Three months later, they released their first demo containing three songs pertaining to the band's original melodic, black metal inspired sound.

In 2002, when the members of Anthelion were only 19 years old, they were for the first time invited to perform at a large music festival - Formoz Festival - in Taiwan. In this year, Anthelion also performed at the Metal Immortal (金屬永生) concert in Taiwan, which was headlined by Dark Funeral. Following this, Anthelion were the opening act for ChthoniC's Relentless for 7 Years concert (冥誕七年演唱會).

In 2003, bassist Edward joined Anthelion, replacing Jin, and along with new guitarist Chaos, Anthelion performed at the Spring Scream Festival in Kenting, Taiwan, which was held in April of that year.

=== Bloodstained Anthelion (2004-2005) ===
On 26 March 2004, Anthelion released their first independent EP Bloodstained Anthelion and toured Taiwan for one year, the last gig of the tour being at INVALI Festival in 2005. Gradually, the band began to build up a fan base.

In 2005 Anthelion were invited to be guests on the popular Taiwanese talk show Kang Xi Lai Le, and although this created the opportunity for them to be exposed to a wider audience, the reckoning of some people that black metal should be something dark and serious created mixed opinions about the appearance among fans.

=== Album preparation and disbandment (2006-2007) ===
In the beginning of 2006, Anthelion commenced creating their first album Bloodshed Rebefallen. This time the members decided to go to Europe and record at Studio Fredman in Sweden. Due to the album being an independent, self-financed production, funding and scheduling issues with the studio postponed the album recording process several times. This was a very difficult time for Anthelion; they tried to collect and raise money using a variety of methods, including taking out a mortgage to increase funds. On top of this, arguments surrounding the composition of the new album’s material emerged and didn't cease.

In February 2007, Chaos, Edward and main composer Code decided to depart the band, leaving the remaining members Troy and Zeist confused about the future of Anthelion, eventually forcing them to announce their disbandment.

Troy: "Till now, I still can't forget what it was like after disbanding. You suddenly lose your focus in life. But, this somehow made me grow up and gave my life perspective".

=== Bloodshed Rebefallen and breakthrough (2007-2009) ===
In March 2007, after putting a stop to all plans for one month, Troy and Zeist decided to ask Code to return to Anthelion. During the negotiations between band members, they received a letter from Studio Fredman confirming the exact schedule for recording, making them feel more determined to restart their recording plans. Luckily, they found their new bassist Ken at the same time. The new Anthelion, with four members, travelled to Studio Fredman in June, where Fredrik Nordstrom recorded the album Bloodshed Rebefallen.

On 21 July 2007, after five years of preparation, Anthelion returned with the album Bloodshed Rebefallen. The re-interpretation of the song Snake Corpse and the music videos for Bloody Matrimony and The Tome of Broken Souls all became quite popular among fans. Following this, the band performed several gigs on tour and were again invited to Formoz Festival, which this time had been extended to fill the whole area of Chungshan Soccer Stadium in Taipei, Taiwan. In the same year they were also invited to perform at Mega Port Festival in Kaohsiung, Taiwan.

Meanwhile, Anthelion started using their self-built studio.

At the end of 2007, Anthelion started touring other countries in Asia, including the Kantou and Kansai regions in Japan (Tokyo, Nagoya, Osaka, Kyoto, and Kobe for six gigs in five cities).

In the beginning of 2008, Anthelion were invited to perform at festivals in Bangkok, Thailand and Singapore.

In the middle of 2008, Anthelion joined a compilation project of their record company, Ultimate Music. This compilation album included two songs from Anthelion.

At the end of 2008, Anthelion performed at Ultimate Metal Festival, organised by Ultimate Music, which included more than ten bands from seven countries performing in Taiwan. This was also the end of Anthelion's Asian tour.

After the tour, which lasted more than one year, they had extended their fan base in Asia, making it possible to release the second edition of Bloodshed Rebefallen.

=== Manjusaka and passing through the 'low tide' (2009-2011) ===
In January 2009, Anthelion went back to the studio to prepare for the recording of their second album; however, bassist Ken decided to leave the band for personal reasons. While searching for a new bassist, Anthelion's remaining members became busy living their own lives and doing other jobs, effectively alienating themselves from band affairs. Anthelion were facing their 'low tide', and the birth of the new album couldn't be foreseen.

At the end of 2009, Siniz was announced as the new bassist for Anthelion. This eliminated the low tide and drew the members together again.

In the spring of 2010, Anthelion commenced recording their new songs and resolved to write music more magniloquent than Bloodshed Rebefallen as they wanted to demonstrate a different atmosphere within their new material.

On 13 August 2010, Anthelion released the EP Manjusaka. In comparison to their older material, which tended to be impetuous, loud and violent, Manjusaka is gently dark and melancholic.

In 2010, Anthelion performed at Rock in Taichung Festival, Taiwan.

In April 2011, Anthelion performed at Spring Scream Festival, Kenting, Taiwan.

In June 2011, Anthelion began a ten-gig tour spanning from Hong Kong to Inner Mongolia, more than 3,000 kilometres across China.

At the end of 2011, five years after their initial studio album, Anthelion started producing their second. Code: "Every time we try to compose and make music, it's like we're challenging ourselves. Others would usually have different opinions about our stuff, yet our music is usually made in this kind of environment which is full of discussion and conflict. I think this kind of challenge is like searching for the 'Dao' of Anthelion; it can't be represented by any single existence. We had many conflicts and difficulties to conquer while producing this album, and you can imagine that if the 'Dao' is for a large group, it wouldn't just satisfy the thinking of the minority. But, doing things this way is what makes us determined. As long as you can digest and ponder over the lyrics and melodies, you will eventually find the song's soul deep at the bottom. That is surely the real Anthelion. Obsidian Plume will not be merely symbolic perfection for Anthelion, but you will see the real Anthelion through this album".

=== Obsidian Plume (2012 - 2014) ===
The album Obsidian Plume was released on 27 June 2014. Prior to this the band set several release dates from 2012 onwards, however, due to communication issues after sending the album abroad for mastering, these release dates were not achieved.

== Logo and band name ==
Anthelion's logo is a combination of the two characters "幻” and “日", which come from the band's name in Mandarin. In ancient China, the natural phenomenon of anthelion was interpreted as an inauspicious symbol. According to Tianwen astronomy from the Book of the Jin Dynasty, one day in January 314 A.D., there were three suns moving from the west to the east. In January 317 A.D., the event happened again, with bright, white rainbows threading the suns. A prognosticator mentioned that "A white rainbow indicates a military disturbance. Three suns means that within three months there will be a leadership scramble among the feudal princes against the emperor". As expected, in March the Kingdom of Wu, located to the east of the Yangtze River, proclaimed itself as China's leading empire. Other feudal princes followed suit, eventually plunging China into chaos.

Interpretations of "Anthelion" can be extended to include the idea of setting out on a punitive expedition against existing systems. Wrong or right, dark or bright, with different angles you will see different answers.

== Band members ==
=== Current ===
- Code – vocals, keyboard (2001 – 2006, 2006–present)
- Zeist - guitar (2001–present)
- Troy - drums (2001–present)
- Siniz - bass (2009–present)

=== Former ===
- Jin - bass (2001 - 2003)
- Edward - bass (2003 - 2007)
- Chaos - guitar (2003 - 2004)
- Han - guitar (2004 - 2005)
- Roslin - keyboard (2004 - 2005)
- Nicole - keyboard (2005)
- Ken - bass (2007 - 2009)

== Discography ==
=== Studio albums ===
- Bloodshed Rebefallen (2007)
- Obsidian Plume (2014)

=== EPs ===
- Bloodstained Anthelion (2004)
- Manjusaka (2010)

=== Compilation albums ===
- BAND.OF.BROTHERS (2004)
- Ultimate Metal, Vol.1 (2008)
- Resurrection of the Gods, Vol.8 (2013)
