= Liers in Wait =

Swedish death metal band

- Origin: Gothenburg, Sweden
- Genre: Death metal
- Years active: 1990-1995
- Label: Black Sun
- Past members: Kristian Wåhlin; Johan Österberg; Mattias Gustavsson; Hans Nilsson; Christofer Johnsson; Tomas Lindberg; Anders Björler; Alf Svensson; Mattias Lindeblad; Daniel Erlandsson

Liers in Wait were a Gothenburg, Sweden-based death metal band active between 1990 and 1995.

The group was formed by Kristian Wåhlin after the dissolution of Grotesque, a precursor to At the Gates, and for a time featured the band's core members, Tomas Lindberg, Anders Björler and Alf Svensson. By the time of EP Spiritually Uncontrolled Art in 1992, the line-up consisted of Wåhlin and Johan Österberg (guitars), Mattias Gustavsson (bass guitar) and Hans Nilsson (drums). Christofer Johnsson from symphonic death metal band Therion sang for the studio recording.

The band played two shows in Poland and produced a Slayer cover for a record company compilation, but due to line-up instability, the group dissolved in 1995.

Daniel Erlandsson played drums for In Flames, Eucharist, and Armageddon before settling with melodic death metal band Arch Enemy. Wåhlin, Osterburg, and Nilsson formed Diabolique. The following year, Nilsson joined Dimension Zero.

== Members ==
=== Last known line-up ===
- Kristian Wåhlin - guitar (1990–1995)
- Johan Österberg - guitar, vocals (1992–1995)
- Mattias Gustavsson - bass guitar (1991–1994)
- Hans Nilsson - drums (1990–1993, 1995)

=== Former line-up ===
- Christofer Johnsson - vocals (1992)
- Tomas Lindberg - vocals (1990)
- Anders Björler - guitar (1990)
- Alf Svensson - guitar (1990)
- Mattias Lindeblad - bass guitar (1990–1991)
- Daniel Erlandsson - drums (1994)

== Discography ==
- Spiritually Uncontrolled Art (1992, EP)
