= Carpet (album) =

Studio album by Ceremonial Oath
- Released: 1995
- Recorded: June–November 1993; Studio Fredman, Gothenburg, Sweden
- Genres: Death metal Melodic death metal
- Length: 31:01
- Language: English
- Label: Black Sun Records
- Producer: Ceremonial Oath

Ceremonial Oath chronology
The Book of Truth (1993)	Carpet (1995)

Professional ratings
Review scores
Source	Rating
Metal Temple	5/10

Carpet is the second and final studio album by Swedish death metal band Ceremonial Oath.

== Track listing ==
1. "The Day I Buried" – 6:06
2. "Dreamsong" – 3:44
3. "Carpet" – 3:30
4. "The Shadowed End" – 3:16
5. "One of Us/Nightshade" – 3:54
6. "Immortalized" – 3:48
7. "Hallowed Be Thy Name" – 6:46 (Iron Maiden cover)

== Credits ==
Ceremonial Oath

- Anders Fridén - vocals
- Anders Iwers - guitar
- Mikael Andersson - guitar
- Tomas Johansson - bass
- Markus Nordberg - drums

Guest

- Tomas Lindberg - vocals
