= Lunar Strain =

Studio album by In Flames
- Released: 1 April 1994
- Recorded: 1993
- Studios: Studio Fredman, Gothenburg
- Genre: Melodic death metal
- Length: 36:43
- Labels: Wrong Again; Regain; Candlelight
- Producer: In Flames

In Flames chronology
Lunar Strain (1994)	Subterranean (1995)

Professional ratings
Review scores
Source	Rating
AllMusic	3/5 stars

Lunar Strain is the debut studio album by Swedish heavy metal band In Flames, released in April 1994. The album is noted for its elements of black metal and Scandinavian folk, the latter exemplified in the inclusion of violins and acoustic guitars.

Lunar Strain the only In Flames full-length to not feature Anders Fridén as the vocalist and Björn Gelotte as either drummer or lead guitarist. Guitarist Jesper Strömblad plays the drums, while the vocals are sung by Dark Tranquillity vocalist Mikael Stanne, a session musician for In Flames at the time. Stanne had sung with the band previously on "Demo '93". Coincidentally, Fridén was the original vocalist for Dark Tranquillity and he effectively traded places with Stanne in 1995. By 2010, all band members who participated in the recording of Lunar Strain had left In Flames.

The songs "Behind Space" and "Clad in Shadows" were re-recorded in the album Colony (1999), featuring In Flames' future lineup; both songs were renamed with the suffix '99 at the end of the title. "Clad in Shadows '99" was also released on the reissue of the album Whoracle (1997).

== Reissues ==
In 1999, the album was re-released under the title Lunar Strain – Subterranean, including all tracks from the band's future release, Subterranean.

On the 2003 Regain Records re-release, the songs order differs slightly, with "Clad in Shadows" being the second track, shifting the rest down by one. However, the discrepancy is not apparent in the album's track listing. Track 10, on the original release "Clad in Shadows", became Track 2 (this was not shown on the album's track list), and each track after track 2 ended up being credited as the track before (i.e. "Clad in Shadows" is credited as "Lunar Strain", and so on).

The album was re-released and remastered with bonus tracks in 2004 via Regain Records and in 2005 via Candlelight Records, featuring the same artwork but a more modern logo, as seen on Reroute to Remain and Come Clarity. The bonus tracks are actually three songs re-recorded from the band's 1993 demo, which contained "alternative mixed versions of the album recordings."

== Track listing ==
All lyrics are written by Mikael Stanne; all music is composed by Glenn Ljungström and Jesper Strömblad.

1994 original release
No.	Title	Length
1.	"Behind Space"	4:55
2.	"Lunar Strain"	4:05
3.	"Starforsaken"	3:10
4.	"Dreamscape" (instrumental)	3:45
5.	"Everlost (Part I)"	4:17
6.	"Everlost (Part II)"	2:57
7.	"Hårgalåten" (instrumental; traditional song)	2:26
8.	"In Flames"	5:33
9.	"Upon an Oaken Throne"	2:49
10.	"Clad in Shadows"	2:49
Total length:		36:43

Lunar Strain – Subterranean (includes tracks from the EP Subterranean)
No.	Title	Length
11.	"Stand Ablaze"	4:33
12.	"Everdying"	4:23
13.	"Subterranean"	5:46
14.	"Timeless"	1:46
15.	"Biosphere"	5:07
16.	"Dead Eternity"	5:01
17.	"The Inborn Lifeless"	3:23

2005 remastered re-release
No.	Title	Length
1.	"Behind Space"	4:55
2.	"Clad in Shadows"	2:49
3.	"Lunar Strain"	4:05
4.	"Starforsaken"	3:10
5.	"Dreamscape" (instrumental)	3:45
6.	"Everlost (Part I)"	4:17
7.	"Everlost (Part II)"	2:57
8.	"Hårgalåten" (instrumental)	2:26
9.	"In Flames"	5:33
10.	"Upon an Oaken Throne"	2:49
11.	"In Flames (1993 Promo Version)"	5:49
12.	"Upon an Oaken Throne (1993 Promo Version)"	3:05
13.	"Acoustic Piece (1993 Promo Version)" (instrumental)	0:38
14.	"Clad in Shadows (1993 Promo Version)"	2:47

== Personnel ==
In Flames

- Mikael Stanne – lead vocals
- Glenn Ljungström – guitars
- Karl "Carl" Näslund – guitars
- Johan Larsson – bass
- Jesper Strömblad – drums, keyboards, guitars

Guest musicians

- Ylva Wåhlstedt – violins, viola
- Jennica Johansson – vocal appearance
- Oscar Dronjak – vocal appearance
- Anders Iwers – guitar (tracks 8–9 and 1993 demo bonus tracks)

Technical personnel

- Fredrik Nordström, H. Bjurkvist, J. Karlsson – engineering
- In Flames, Fredrik Nordström – mixing
- StageTech – production
- Kenneth Johansson – cover art and photos
- Henrik Lindahl – additional photos
- Local Hero Music – layout

== Release history ==
Region	Date	Format	Label
Various	1 April 1994	CD	Wrong Again
Japan	1999	CD	Toy's Factory
Various	2003	CD	Regain / Candelight
Various	2005	CD	Regain / Candlelight
