= The Jester Race =

Studio album by In Flames
- Released: 20 February 1996
- Recorded: November 1995
- Studio: Studio Fredman, Gothenburg
- Genre: Melodic death metal
- Length: 40:12
- Label: Nuclear Blast
- Producer: Fredrik Nordström and In Flames

In Flames chronology
Subterranean (1995)	The Jester Race (1996)	Whoracle (1997)

Professional ratings
Review scores
Source	Rating
AllMusic	5/5 stars
Chronicles of Chaos	8/10

The Jester Race is the second studio album by Swedish heavy metal band In Flames, released in February 1996. It is the first album to feature Anders Fridén as the band's vocalist, Björn Gelotte as the drummer, and Jester Head as the band's mascot.

== Background ==
The Jester Race was recorded at Studio Fredman by Fredrik Nordström, who also contributed keyboards for the album.

The song "Dead Eternity" was originally on their 1995 EP, Subterranean. "Dead God in Me" was also originally on Subterranean but with a different title, "The Inborn Lifeless", as well as different lyrics, a different ending, and a slightly different solo.

A remixed version of the song "Moonshield" was released on the EP Trigger. A video for the song "Artifacts of the Black Rain" was also released.

== Reception and legacy ==
The Jester Race ranked No. 79 on Metal Rules' list of the Top 100 Heavy Metal Albums. It is considered a classic album of the melodic death metal genre, along with At the Gates' Slaughter of the Soul and Dark Tranquillity's The Gallery, exhibiting the dual guitar leads, growled vocals and acoustic sections typical of the genre.

Trivium frontman Matthew K. Heafy said in an interview with Wall of Sound that The Jester Race is "the one metal album you should have heard by now."

== Track listing ==
No.	Title	Music	Length
1.	"Moonshield"	Jesper Strömblad	5:04
2.	"The Jester's Dance" (instrumental)	Strömblad, Johan Larsson	2:11
3.	"Artifacts of the Black Rain"	Strömblad, Björn Gelotte	3:17
4.	"Graveland"	Strömblad, Glenn Ljungström	2:48
5.	"Lord Hypnos"	Gelotte, Strömblad, Ljungström	4:03
6.	"Dead Eternity"	Ljungström, Strömblad	5:03
7.	"The Jester Race"	Ljungström, Strömblad	4:53
8.	"December Flower"	Strömblad, Ljungström	4:12
9.	"Wayfaerer" (instrumental)	Strömblad, Gelotte	4:42
10.	"Dead God in Me"	Strömblad, Ljungström	4:19
Total length:			40:12

2002 and 2008 re-releases (tracks from Black-Ash Inheritance)
No.	Title	Music	Length
11.	"Goliaths Disarm Their Davids"	Ljungström, Strömblad, Gelotte	4:55
12.	"Gyroscope"	Strömblad	3:23
13.	"Acoustic Medley" (instrumental)	Strömblad	2:32
14.	"Behind Space" (live)	Ljungström, Strömblad	3:36

Japanese edition
No.	Title	Music	Length
1.	"Dead Eternity"	Ljungström, Strömblad	5:03
2.	"The Jester Race"	Ljungström, Strömblad	4:53
3.	"Graveland"	Strömblad, Glenn Ljungström	2:48
4.	"Moonshield"	Jesper Strömblad	5:04
5.	"The Jester's Dance" (instrumental)	Strömblad, Johan Larsson	2:11
6.	"December Flower"	Strömblad, Ljungström	4:12
7.	"Artifacts of the Black Rain"	Strömblad, Björn Gelotte	3:17
8.	"Dead God in Me"	Strömblad, Ljungström	4:19
9.	"Wayfaerer" (instrumental)	Strömblad, Gelotte	4:42
10.	"Lord Hypnos"	Gelotte, Strömblad, Ljungström	4:03
11.	"Dead Eternity (Demo)"		5:02
12.	"The Inborn Lifeless (Demo)"		3:22

== Personnel ==
=== In Flames ===
- Anders Fridén − lead vocals
- Jesper Strömblad − electric and acoustic guitar, keyboards
- Glenn Ljungström − electric guitars
- Johan Larsson − bass guitar, backing vocals
- Björn Gelotte − drums, additional guitars

=== Guest appearances ===
- Fredrik Nordström − keyboards
- Oscar Dronjak − vocal appearance on "Dead Eternity"
- Fredrik Johansson − lead guitar on "December Flower"
- Kaspar Dahlqvist − keyboards on "Wayfaerer"

=== Production and composition ===
- Produced by Fredrik Nordström and In Flames
- Lyrical concept and song titles collaborated by Niklas Sundin and Anders Fridén
- Lyrics on "Dead Eternity" by Jocke Göthberg
- Engineered by Fredrik Nordström and Patrik Hellgren
- Mastered by Staffan Olofsson
- Logo by Glenn Ljungström
- Artwork by Andreas Marschall
- Photos by Kenneth Johansson
- Layout by M&A Music art
