= Kulturzentrum Schlachthof (Wiesbaden) =

Coordinates: 50.0667°N 8.2472°E

Schlachthof
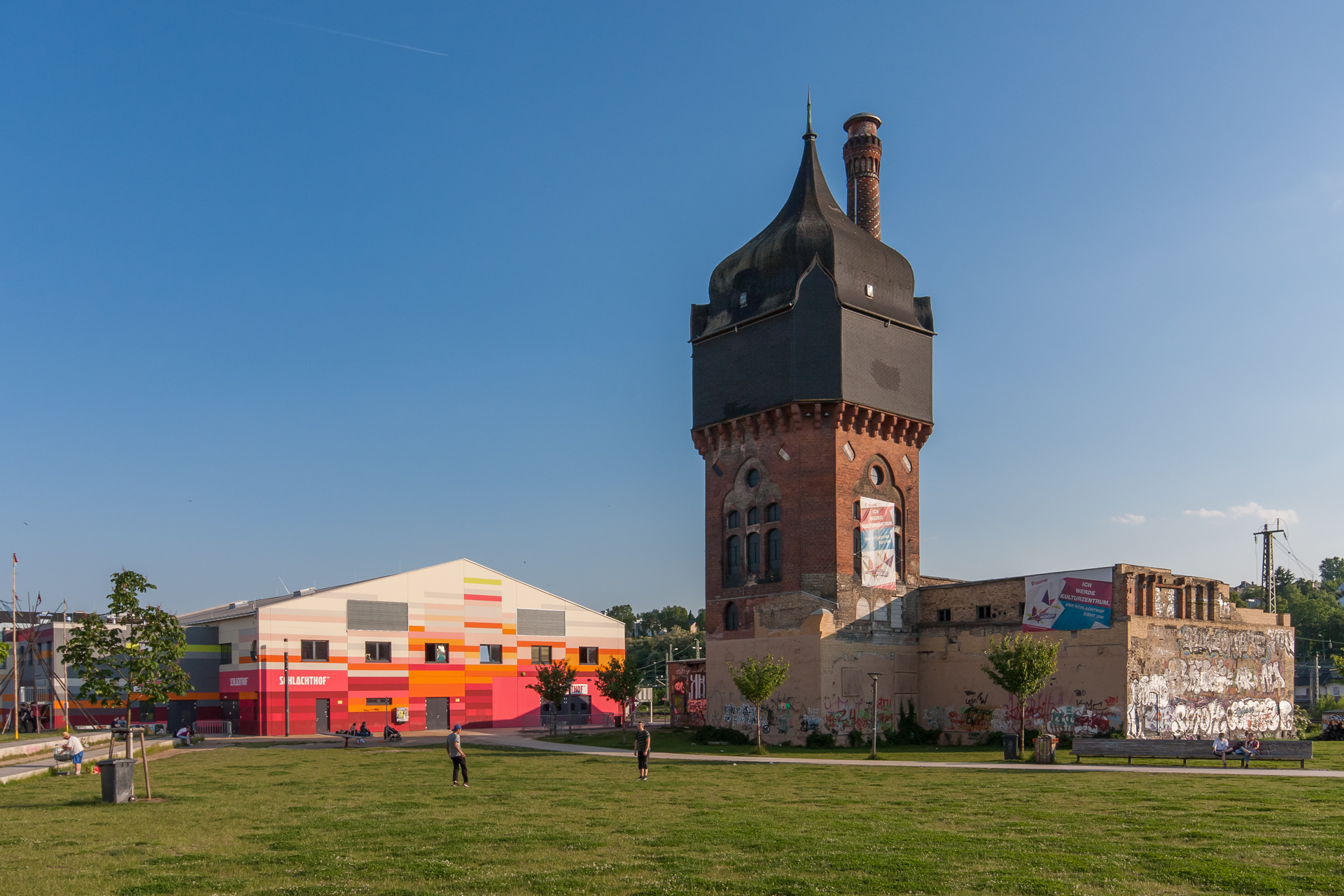
- Schlachthof with the water tower, before its restoration
- Founded: 1994
- Type: Cultural center
- Location: Wiesbaden, Hesse, Germany
- Product: Venue for concerts and other cultural events
- Website: www.schlachthof-wiesbaden.de

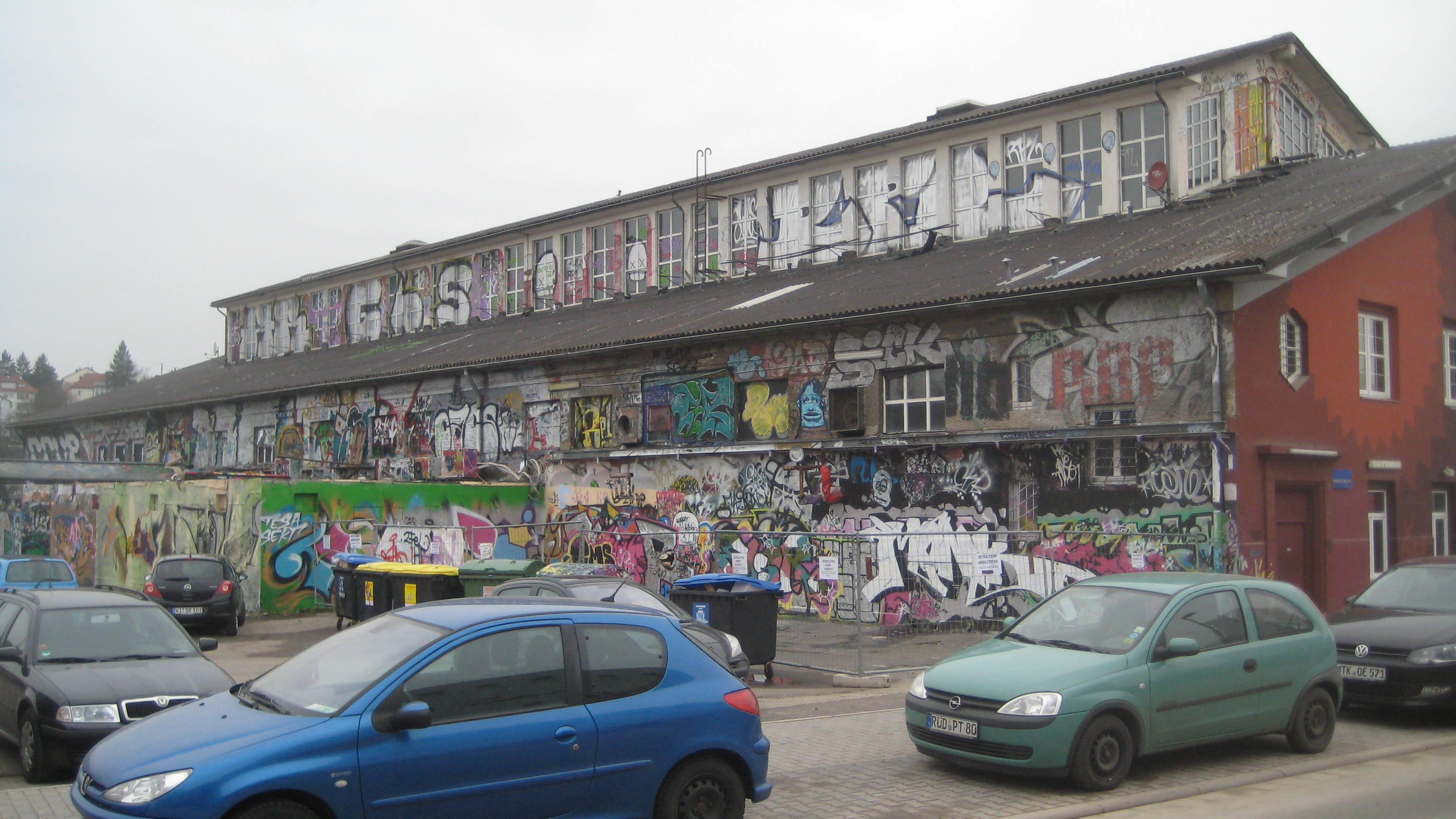
Schlachthof, southern side, with graffiti

The Kulturzentrum Schlachthof (literally: Cultural Center Slaughterhouse) in Wiesbaden, Hesse, Germany, is a cultural center in a complex which formerly housed the municipal slaughterhouse, approximately 500 meters southeast of the Wiesbaden Hauptbahnhof railway station. The cultural center, known as Schlachthof, was founded in 1994. It offers two concert halls for events from 300 to 2,000 people; the large concert hall has an area of about 1,200 square meters. The location is used for concert in rock, metal and punk, for music parties, poetry slams and readings. It is surrounded by a leisure park.

== History ==
The slaughterhouse closed in 1990 due to inefficiency and non-compliance with EC hygiene guidelines. In the following years, most of the abandoned buildings were torn down. Only two halls and a 36 meters high, historic water tower (built 1897-1899) remained.

In 1994 these remaining buildings were occupied by the Kulturzentrum Schlachthof. While the large hall served from 1994-2010 for large concerts and parties, smaller concerts took place in the former smoke house from 1994 to 2015. This building also contained rehearsal rooms and studios.

Among the groups performing at the Schlachthof are The Verve, The Sisters of Mercy, Motörhead, Simple Minds, Apocalyptica, Dropkick Murphys, Die Fantastischen Vier, Die Toten Hosen, Bullet for My Valentine, Sportfreunde Stiller, Deichkind und Fettes Brot, in around 150 concerts per year. The Finnish band Nightwish produced a video, Wish I Had An Angel, which shows the buildings, then with singer Tarja Turunen.

After the great concert hall had to close in 2010 due to danger of collapse, a new concert hall was inaugurated in November 2012. The historic water tower was renovated for E4.5 million and inaugurated in March 2015, marking the end of a five-year renovation program for the entire complex. It is now used as an office building; its outbuildings are used for small concerts and house a bar. The last of the old slaughterhouse buildings was torn down in 2015.

In 2008 the approximately 3 hectares of fallow land around the historic water tower and the former slaughterhouse were remodeled for leisure and cultural park with tree plantings, walk lawns, a beach volleyball court, a boule court, a track for skateboarders and children's play equipment.
