= Hans Nilsson (musician) =

Swedish drummer (born 1972)

- Born: Hans Nilsson; 22 December 1972 (age 53); Gothenburg, Sweden
- Genres: Death metal, gothic metal
- Instruments: Drums, guitar
- Years active: 1988 - Present
- Website: http://www.dimensionzero.se

Hans "Hasse" Nilsson (born 22 December 1972) is a Swedish current drummer for the band Dimension Zero.

His experience within the Swedish metal scene goes back many years, and has included many of its luminaries; Liers in Wait, with Kristian Wåhlin; Luciferion, an early band of Dark Tranquillity's Michael Nicklasson; and Crystal Age, consisting of Oscar Dronjak (HammerFall, ex-Ceremonial Oath) and Fredrik Larsson (ex-HammerFall).

Dimension Zero features former In Flames guitarist Jesper Strömblad, also formerly of Ceremonial Oath and HammerFall.

Nilsson's style generally sways within the "blastbeat/double bass" tempo that is typical of death metal. However, one exception can be seen in Diabolique, which takes strong influence from gothic metal.

Nilsson started as a guitarist in his early days but switched to play the drums. He still plays guitar and wrote one of the songs on Dimension Zero's debut album Silent Night Fever. He also wrote a lot of the music in the band Crystal Age.

== Discography ==
=== Crystal Age ===
- Far Beyond Divine Horizons (Vic Records,1995)

=== Diabolique ===
- The Diabolique (EP, 1996)
- Wedding The Grotesque (1997)
- The Black Flower (1999)
- Butterflies (EP, 2000)
- The Green Goddess (2001)

=== Dimension Zero ===
- Penetrations from the Lost World (1997)
- Silent Night Fever (2002)
- This Is Hell (2003)
- He Who Shall Not Bleed (2007)

=== Liers in Wait ===
- Spiritually Uncontrolled Art (1992)

=== Luciferion ===
- The Apostate (2003)

=== The Great Deceiver ===
- Cave-In (1999)
- Jet Black Art (2000)
- A Venom Well Designed (2002)
