= Diabolique (band) =

Swedish gothic metal band

- Origin: Sweden
- Genres: Pop rock; gothic rock
- Years active: 1995–present
- Labels: Black Sun Records
- Members: Kristian Wåhlin; Johan Osterberg; Bino Carlsson; Hans Nilsson
- Past members: Alf Svensson; Daniel Svensson

Diabolique was a Swedish pop rock band formed in 1995 after the dissolution of Liers in Wait. The group is heavily influenced by The Sisters of Mercy, Black Sabbath, and Fields of the Nephilim, and in sound are similar to the styles of Charon, Tiamat, Moonspell, and Type O Negative.

The band's current and former line-up has consisted of many musicians from progenital Gothenburg melodic death metal bands; Kristian Wåhlin, Johan Osterberg, and Alf Svensson were in Grotesque (a predecessor of At the Gates, who Alf would eventually join); and Daniel Svensson briefly played drums with the group before going on to major success with In Flames.

The band's most recent release was The Green Goddess (2001). Various sources differ as to band's status. However, Hans Nilsson's full-time involvement with Dimension Zero and Wåhlin's extensive contributions as an album cover artist and musician for other Scandinavian-area extreme metal bands may be attributable to the long period of no activity.

== Band members ==
- Kristian Wåhlin – vocals, guitar
- Johan Osterberg – guitar
- Bino Carlsson – bass
- Hans Nilsson – drums

=== Former members ===
- Alf Svensson – bass
- Daniel Svensson – drums

== Discography ==
- The Diabolique (1996)
- Wedding the Grotesque (1997)
- The Black Flower (1999)
- Butterflies (2000)
- The Green Goddess (2001)
