= Daniel Antonsson =

Swedish guitarist and bassist (born 1974)

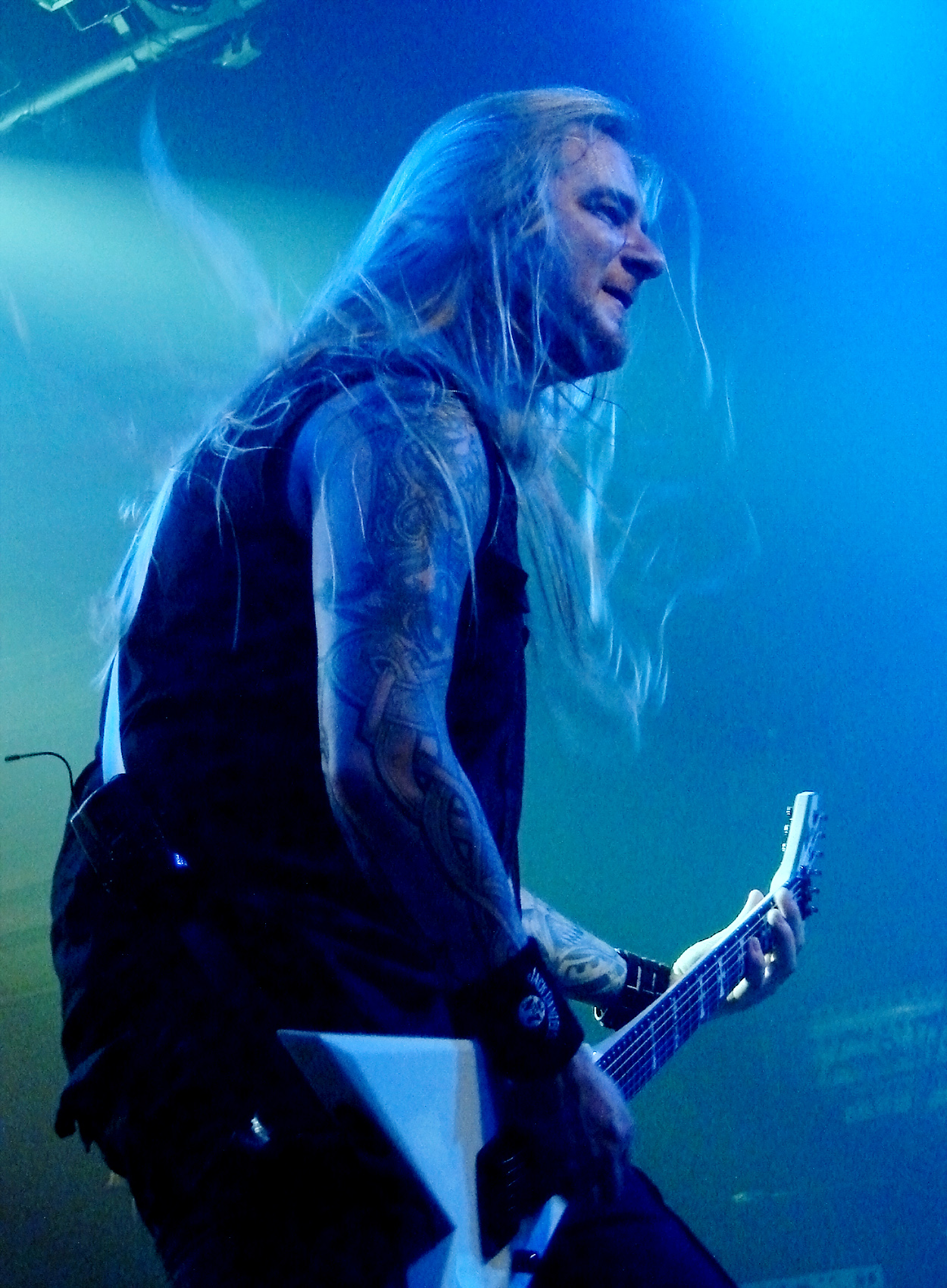
- Antonsson with Soilwork in 2007

Background information
- Born: 16 December 1974 (age 51)
- Genres: Melodic death metal, death metal, thrash metal, power metal, alternative metal
- Occupation: Musician
- Instruments: Guitar, bass
- Years active: 1995–present
- Member of: Pathos
- Formerly of: Dark Tranquillity, Dimension Zero, Soilwork

Daniel Antonsson (born 16 December 1974) is a Swedish musician. He is a former guitarist of the melodic death metal band Dimension Zero, a former bassist of Dark Tranquillity, playing on the 2010 album We Are the Void, and a former guitarist of Soilwork, appearing on the 2007 Sworn to a Great Divide. He uses Esp Nv-std guitar and Mayones Guitars & Basses.

His music career started in a band called "Pathos". In March 2014, a heavy metal band considered a supergroup with mostly Swedish members named Akani, was announced and formed by Antonsson himself on co-guitar, Jorge Rosado (Merauder, ex-Ill Niño) on vocals, Anders Björler (At the Gates, ex-The Haunted) on co-guitar, Victor Brandt (Dominion, ex-Aeon, ex-Entombed, ex-Satyricon) on bass guitar, and Anders Lowgren (Dead Reprise) on drums. In the same month, the band released a song titled "Who's to Blame?" from their upcoming four-song seven-inch single called "Santa Muerte", where the album art was released as well. Santa Muerte was released in March 2014 through Demons Run Amok Records and the release was produced, recorded and mixed by the band themselves and with Martin Jacobsson at Rovljud Studios in Örebro.

== Discography ==
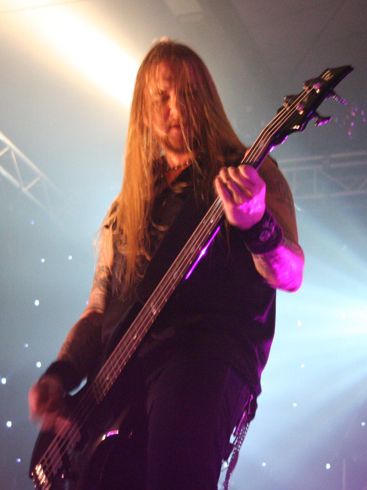
Antonsson with Dark Tranquillity in 2008

with Dimension Zero

- This Is Hell (2003)
- He Who Shall Not Bleed (2007)

with Soilwork

- Sworn to a Great Divide (2007)

with Dark Tranquillity

- Projector (1999/2009)
- Where Death Is Most Alive (2009)
- The Dying Fragments (2009)
- We are the Void (2010)
- Zero Distance EP (2012)
