= Ceremonial Oath =

Swedish death metal band

- Also known as: Desecrator (1989–1991)
- Origin: Mölndal, Sweden
- Genres: Melodic death metal; death metal
- Years active: 1989–1996, 2012–present
- Labels: Corpsegrinder, Modern Primitive, Black Sun
- Members: Oscar Dronjak; Anders Iwers; Jesper Strömblad; Markus Nordberg
- Past members: Anders Fridén; Mikael Andersson; Thomas Johansson; Marcus Fredriksson; Ulf Assarsson

Ceremonial Oath is a Swedish death metal band formed in 1989. They were originally called Desecrator but changed their name to Ceremonial Oath in 1991 and disbanded in 1996. They released three demos, one EP and two studio albums. Several band members would form or join bands that would achieve greater success, such as In Flames and HammerFall, a band that would influence the awakened interest in power metal and traditional heavy metal.

Ceremonial Oath reunited for an appearance at the inaugural edition of The Gothenburg Sound festival on January 5–6, 2013 at Trädgår'n in Gothenburg, and made appearances on a few other festivals later the same year. In addition to that, a remixed and remastered version of their 1993 album, The Book of Truth, was re-released in the beginning of 2013. Other than reuniting for a string of shows, Ceremonial Oath has no plans to record or release new material.

== Band members ==
=== Current ===
- Oscar Dronjak – vocals, guitar (1989–1993, 2012–present)
- Anders Iwers – guitar (1989–1996, 2012–present)
- Markus Nordberg – drums (1991–1996, 2012–present)
- Jesper Strömblad – bass (1991–1993, 2012–present)

=== Former ===
- Ulf Assarsson – drums (1989–1991)
- Marcus Fredriksson – bass, vocals (1989–1990)
- Thomas Johansson – bass (1993–1996)
- Mikael Andersson – guitar (1993–1996)
- Anders Fridén – vocals (1993–1996)

=== Session lineup ===
- Tomas Lindberg – vocals (1993–1995)
- Peter Ekberg – bass (1990–1991)
- Fredrik Nordström – keyboards (1992–1993)

== Discography ==
=== As Desecrator ===
- Wake the Dead (Demo, 1990)
- Black Sermons (Demo, 1990)

=== As Ceremonial Oath ===
- Promo 1991 (Demo, 1991)
- Lost Name of God (EP, Corpse Grinder Records, 1992)
- The Book of Truth (CD, Modern Primitive Records, 1993)
- Carpet (CD, Black Sun Records, 1995)
