= Johan Larsson (bassist) =

Swedish bassist (born 1974)

- Born: 8 December 1974 (age 51); Gothenburg, Sweden
- Genres: Melodic death metal
- Occupation: Musician
- Instruments: Bass, vocals
- Years active: 1993–1999, 2001, 2006, 2010
- Formerly of: In Flames, HammerFall, Purgamentum

Johan Larsson (born 8 December 1974) is a Swedish bass guitarist, best known as a former member of the heavy metal band In Flames from 1993 until 1997. He was also the original bassist of HammerFall from 1993 to 1994, quitting before the band released any material, and a member of Purgamentum, also providing vocals. He is currently the vocalist of the band Carrion Carnage. Currently, the band is on hiatus.

== Discography ==
=== In Flames ===
- Demo '93 – 1993 (demo)
- Lunar Strain – 1994
- Subterranean EP – 1995 (backing vocals as well)
- Artifacts of the Black Rain – 1996 (promo music video/VHS)
- The Jester Race – 1996 (backing vocals as well)
- Live & Plugged – 1997 (split DVD/video)
- Black-Ash Inheritance EP – 1997
- Whoracle (1997)
- Bullet Ride – 2000 (compilation; track 3)
