= Whoracle =

Studio album by In Flames
- Released: 18 November 1997
- Recorded: 1997
- Studios: Studio Fredman, Gothenburg, Sweden
- Genre: Melodic death metal
- Length: 42:29
- Label: Nuclear Blast
- Producers: Fredrik Nordström and In Flames

In Flames chronology
The Jester Race (1996)	Whoracle (1997)	Colony (1999)

Professional ratings
Review scores
Source	Rating
AllMusic	4/5 stars

Whoracle is the third studio album by Swedish heavy metal band In Flames, released on 18 November 1997. The title of the album is a portmanteau of the English words "whore" and "oracle". It is the final In Flames album to feature Johan Larsson and Glenn Ljungström. It is also the last release with Björn Gelotte playing drums, as he permanently switched to lead guitar in future releases.

In 2020, it was named one of the 20 best metal albums of 1997 by Metal Hammer magazine.

== Overview ==
Apart from "Everything Counts", which is a cover of a Depeche Mode song, all songs were composed and arranged by In Flames. The lyrics were translated by Dark Tranquillity guitarist Niklas Sundin, as Anders Fridén was not confident in his English.

Fredrik Nordström noted that it was not easy to record at times, since the band members usually preferred drinking beer and playing Tekken 3.

While some regard Whoracle as a concept album, guitarist Jesper Strömblad denied this. He acknowledged reading reports that Fridén came up with a story around the end and rebirth of the world, but recalled events differently and said the album wasn't solely about that.

== Track listing ==
All lyrics written by Niklas Sundin and Anders Fridén.

No.	Title	Music	Length
1.	"Jotun"	Jesper Strömblad, Björn Gelotte	3:53
2.	"Food for the Gods"	Glenn Ljungström, Gelotte, Strömblad	4:21
3.	"Gyroscope"	Strömblad	3:26
4.	"Dialogue with the Stars" (Instrumental)	Gelotte, Strömblad	3:00
5.	"The Hive"	Gelotte, Strömblad	4:03
6.	"Jester Script Transfigured"	Strömblad	5:46
7.	"Morphing into Primal"	Gelotte, Ljungström, Fridén, Strömblad	3:05
8.	"Worlds Within the Margin"	Ljungström, Strömblad	5:06
9.	"Episode 666"	Strömblad	3:45
10.	"Everything Counts" (Depeche Mode cover)	Martin Lee Gore	3:17
11.	"Whoracle" (Instrumental)	Strömblad	2:44
Total length:			42:29

Deluxe edition
No.	Title	Length
12.	"Clad in Shadows '99"	2:25
Total length:		44:54

Japanese and Korean edition
No.	Title	Length
12.	"Goliaths Disarm Their Davids"	4:58
13.	"Acoustic Medley"	2:33
14.	"Behind Space - Live"	3:36
Total length:		53:36

LP bonus track
No.	Title	Length
6.	"Re-cycles" (original title: "Acoustic Medley")	2:33
Total length:		45:02

2010 re-issue
No.	Title	Length
12.	"Goliaths Disarm Their Davids"	4:58
13.	"Jotun (Live)"	3:38
14.	"Food for the Gods (Live)"	4:11
Total length:		55:16

== Personnel ==
In Flames

- Anders Fridén – vocals, percussion
- Glenn Ljungström – lead guitar
- Jesper Strömblad – rhythm guitar, acoustic guitar, keyboards, percussion
- Johan Larsson – bass
- Björn Gelotte – drums, percussion, additional guitars

Other personnel

- Ulrika Netterdahl – female vocals on song "Whoracle"
- The Whoracle concept conjured and verbalized by Niklas Sundin and Anders Fridén
- Lyrics written by Niklas Sundin following original synopsis by Anders Fridén
- All music composed and arranged by In Flames except "Everything Counts" by Martin Lee Gore of Depeche Mode
- Recorded and produced by Fredrik Nordström with assistance from In Flames
- Engineered by Anders Fridén and Fredrik Nordström
- Mixed by Fredrik Nordström and Anders Fridén
- Mastered by Goran Finnberg and Fredrik Nordstrom at the Mastering Room Gbg
- Cover artwork by Andreas Marschall
- Photos by Kenneth Johansson
- All songs published by Prophecies Publishing Hamburg except "Everything Counts"
- "Everything Counts" published by Grabbing Hands Music Ltd, sub-published by EMI Music Germany
