= Studio Fredman =

Recording studio in Gothenburg, Sweden

Studio Fredman is a well-known recording studio in Gothenburg, Sweden, owned and operated by producer Fredrik Nordström.

It is popular among Swedish metal bands, with artists such as At the Gates, Deathstars, Nightrage, Norwegian band Dimmu Borgir, Arch Enemy, Soilwork, Dark Tranquillity, In Flames, Zonaria, Machinae Supremacy, HammerFall, England's Bring Me the Horizon, A Breach of Silence, and Opeth recording multiple releases in the studio.

Originally, it was located in Gothenburg, but by 2005, it was relocated to Hyssna about 30 miles outside Gothenburg.

The original facility was also co-owned by In Flames vocalist, Anders Fridén. By the time of relocation, the original studio became In Flames-owned IF Studios.

In 2008, Studio Fredman relocated once again in downtown Gothenburg at Västra Frölunda/Högsbo.

== Albums recorded ==
Releases	Band	Year
The Book of Truth	Ceremonial Oath	1993

=== 1994 ===
- At the Gates – Terminal Spirit Disease
- In Flames – Lunar Strain
- In Flames – Subterranean
- Luciferion – Demonication (The Manifest)
- Nifelheim – Nifelheim

=== 1995 ===
- Ceremonial Oath – Carpet
- Memory Garden – Forever
- At the Gates – Slaughter of the Soul
- Crystal Age – Far Beyond Divine Horizons
- Dark Tranquillity – The Gallery

=== 1996 ===
- Memory Garden – Tides
- Arch Enemy – Black Earth
- In Flames – The Jester Race
- Sacrilege – Lost in the Beauty You Slay
- Dark Tranquillity – Enter Suicidal Angels

=== 1997 ===
- Dark Tranquillity – The Mind's I
- In Flames – Whoracle

=== 1998 ===
- Arch Enemy – Stigmata
- Opeth – My Arms, Your Hearse
- Soilwork – Steelbath Suicide

=== 1999 ===
- Arch Enemy – Burning Bridges
- Dark Tranquillity – Projector
- In Flames – Colony
- Opeth – Still Life

=== 2000 ===
- In Flames – Clayman
- Soilwork – The Chainheart Machine

=== 2001 ===
- Dimmu Borgir – Puritanical Euphoric Misanthropia
- Opeth – Blackwater Park
- Soilwork – A Predator's Portrait

=== 2002 ===
- Opeth – Deliverance
- Soilwork – Natural Born Chaos
- Buried Dreams (Mex) – Necrosphere

=== 2003 ===
- Opeth – Damnation
- Darkest Hour – Hidden Hands of a Sadist Nation
- Passenger – Passenger

=== 2006 ===
- I Killed the Prom Queen – Music for the Recently Deceased

=== 2007 ===
- Anthelion – Bloodshed Rebefallen

=== 2008 ===
- Bring Me the Horizon – Suicide Season
- Firewind – The Premonition

=== 2009 ===
- Old Man's Child – Slaves of the World

=== 2010 ===
- Bring Me the Horizon – There Is a Hell...

=== 2014 ===
- I Killed the Prom Queen – Beloved
- Architects – Lost Forever // Lost Together
- Decadawn – Solitary Confinement

=== 2016 ===
- Follow My Lead – Spit, Kick, Revolt.
- Architects – All Our Gods Have Abandoned Us

=== 2021 ===
- Obscura – A Valediction

=== 2023 ===
- Killsorrow – Wasteland Chronicles
