= Glenn Ljungström =

Swedish guitarist

- Born: 7 September 1974 (age 51); Gothenburg, Sweden
- Genres: Melodic death metal, power metal, death metal
- Occupation: Guitarist
- Years active: 1993–2003, 2011–present
- Labels: Nuclear Blast, Wrong Again, Regain, War Music

Glenn Ljungström (born 7 September 1974) is a Swedish guitarist from Nödinge-Nol. He was a guitarist and composer in a few Swedish metal bands. He was most notably in the heavy metal band In Flames from 1993 to 1997. He quit In Flames to support his family with a more stable job. The other two bands that which he took part in 1995 were in HammerFall until 1997, and a side project he co-founded with Jesper Strömblad called Dimension Zero, which he remained in until 2003. He was lastly the guitarist for a band called The Resistance with Jesper Strömblad and Marco Aro from 2011 until 2015.

== Appearances ==
=== In Flames ===
- Demo '93 (1993)
- Lunar Strain (1994)
- Subterranean (1995, EP)
- Artifacts of the Black Rain (1996, Video)
- The Jester Race (1996)
- Live & Plugged (1997, Split DVD)
- Black-Ash Inheritance (1997, EP)
- Whoracle (1997)
- Bullet Ride (2000, Compilation)

=== HammerFall ===
- Glory to the Brave (1997, Full-Length)
- "Glory to the Brave" (1997, Single)
- On Tour (1999, EP)
- The First Crusade (1999, DVD)

=== Dimension Zero ===
- Penetrations from the Lost World (1997, EP)
- Silent Night Fever (2001)
- This Is Hell (2003)

=== The Resistance ===
- Rise From Treason (2013, EP)
- Scars (2013)
- Torture Tactics (2015, EP)
- Coup de grâce (2016)
