= Jesper Strömblad =

Swedish guitarist (born 1972)

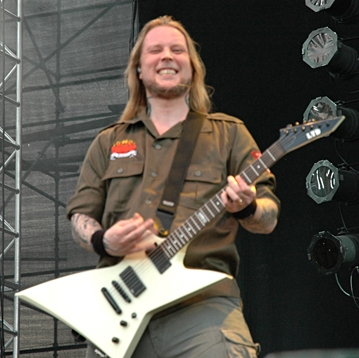
- Strömblad in 2013

Background information
- Born: Clas Håkan Jesper Strömblad; 28 November 1972 (age 53); Gothenburg, Sweden
- Genres: Heavy metal; melodic death metal; groove metal; power metal; alternative metal
- Occupation: Musician
- Instruments: Guitar, bass, keyboards, drums (early)
- Years active: 1989–present
- Member of: Dimension Zero; Cyhra; The Halo Effect
- Formerly of: In Flames; Ceremonial Oath; HammerFall; Sinergy; All Ends; The Resistance; Nightrage

Clas Håkan Jesper Strömblad (born 28 November 1972) is a Swedish musician who is the rhythm guitarist of the bands The Halo Effect, Dimension Zero and Cyhra, and formerly of In Flames and The Resistance. He is best known as the founder and former rhythm guitarist/drummer/keyboardist of the pioneering melodic death metal band In Flames, rhythm guitarist of the band Sinergy, bassist of Ceremonial Oath and drummer of HammerFall. In 2013, he joined Nightrage as a session guitarist.

In 2004, Strömblad (along with Björn Gelotte) was ranked No. 70 out of 100 Greatest Heavy Metal Guitarists of all time by Guitar World.

== Early life ==
Strömblad began playing violin at age four, until age 12 when he no longer considered it a "cool" instrument and instead began playing guitar. He plays guitar right-handed despite being left-handed.

== Bands ==
=== Ceremonial Oath (1990–1993) ===
In 1990 Strömblad joined the band Ceremonial Oath (then called Desecrator) until quitting in 1993 over creative differences. After disbanding in 1996, it reunited in 2013 with Strömblad on bass for The Gothenburg Sound and Hellfest festivals.

=== HammerFall (1993–1997) ===
Fellow Ceremonial Oath member Oscar Dronjak formed HammerFall with Strömblad as drummer in 1993. He quit in 1997 before their first album Glory to the Brave was released where he is credited for lyrics and incorrectly listed as the drummer (the sessions were recorded with Patrik Räfling). He is credited for lyrics on 1998's Legacy of Kings as well.

=== Dimension Zero (1995) ===
In 1995, Strömblad founded Agent Orange with In Flames guitarist Glenn Ljungström. Renamed Dimension Zero that same year, Strömblad primarily played bass guitar with Jocke Gothberg on vocals and Hans Nilsson on drums. The band went on hiatus in 2008 and reunited in 2014 to play at Gothenburg Sound Festival 2015.

=== Sinergy (1997) ===
In 1997, Strömblad met Kimberly Goss of Dimmu Borgir while on tour with In Flames. After Goss quit Dimmu Borgir and moved to Sweden they formed Sinergy as a female-fronted band with Goss on vocals, Ronny Milianowicz on drums, Sharlee D'Angelo on bass and Alexi Laiho on guitar. The band released Beware the Heavens in 1999 and Strömblad left the band that same year.

=== All Ends (2003) ===
In 2003, Strömblad and In Flames bandmate Björn Gelotte formed All Ends with Emma Gelotte and Tinna Karlsdotter on vocals and Joseph "Joey" Skansås on drums. Gelotte and Strömblad played guitar and bass on their demo and have songwriting credits on their first album. After a second album release and lineup changes, the band has been on hiatus since 2012.

=== In Flames (1990–2010) ===
Strömblad started In Flames as a side project while in Ceremonial Oath to combine Iron Maiden-esque melodies with death metal brutality and keyboards. After leaving Ceremonial Oath in 1993 he brought in Glenn Ljungström on guitar and Johan Larsson on bass to record a demo. The owner of Wrong Again Records liked the demo, so the group lied and said they had thirteen songs already recorded, when in fact they only had three. Strömblad switched from drumming / keyboards to guitar in 1994.

On 3 February 2009, the band announced that Strömblad would be stepping back from touring to enter rehab for alcohol abuse. Niclas Engelin was announced as his replacement. On 12 February 2010 he announced that he was leaving the band permanently, stating:

I have decided it is best for me to leave in Flames and to quit the band permanently.

The last 17 years have been a blast, and I am proud to have been part of this great journey, with the most talented and amazing people anyone can wish to have the privilege to work with.

I'm also the luckiest guy in the world, to have the BEST fans in the world, who have been supporting me during my difficult times. It means the world to me, and I'm determined to fight and defeat my demons once and for all.... and by the help from you guys, I'm on my way.

I'm far from done with music, metal, or whatever my direction is taking me, so be sure to hear from me in the future.

… May the Force be with you!

— Jesper Strömblad

In 2023, Strömblad revealed that his departure from In Flames was partly influenced by his desire to keep their sound "death-metal", while other members wanted to go in a more radio-friendly direction.

=== The Resistance (2011-2016) ===
Strömblad formed The Resistance in 2011 after discussing the idea with vocalist Marco Aro (The Haunted) while playing the first-person-shooter Call of Duty. Guitarist Glenn Ljungström (Ex-In Flames), bassist Alex Losbäck Holstad (Despite), and drummer Chris Barkensjö (Carnal Forge, ex-Graves). Strömblad was the guitarist until leaving the band in 2016.

=== CyHra (2017–present) ===
Formed in 2017, Strömblad co-founded CyHra, a Swedish heavy metal supergroup with vocalist Joacim "Jake E" Keelyn (ex-Amaranthe), German drummer Alex Landenburg (Kamelot, ex-Annihilator, ex-Axxis), lead guitarist Euge Valovirta (ex-Shining). Strömblad plays rhythm guitar, bass and keyboards. In late 2018 Strömblad stepped back from touring, citing personal issues while rhythm guitarist Marcus Sunesson (Engel) took over touring duties until formally joining the band in 2019. He is credited for lyrics and guitar on their albums No Halos in Hell (2019) and Vertigo Trigger (2023).

== Other projects ==
In 2009 Strömblad was reportedly working on a project with vocalist Roland Johansson (ex-Sonic Syndicate).

In 2012, Strömblad composed the score for the Swedish movie Isdraken, directed by Martin Högdahl.

== Equipment ==
Strömblad has played ESP Snakebyte and Eclipse guitars, reportedly uses 81/85 active pickups and has a signature variant of the ESP EX series. He has also played Gibson Flying V and Explorer Voodoo and Gothic Explorer II models. In 2014 he played a Cort Z-Custom 2. He has used the Peavey 5150/6505 amp and rack-mounted Line 6 POD Pro.

== Discography ==
with Ceremonial Oath

- Promo 1991 (1991)
- The Book of Truth (1993)

with In Flames

- Lunar Strain (1994)
- The Jester Race (1996)
- Whoracle (1997)
- Colony (1999)
- Clayman (2000)
- Reroute to Remain (2002)
- Soundtrack to Your Escape (2004)
- Come Clarity (2006)
- A Sense of Purpose (2008)

With HammerFall (songwriting credits)

- Glory to the Brave (1997)
- Legacy of Kings (1998)
- Renegade (2000)
- No Sacrifice, No Victory (2009)

With Sinergy

- Beware the Heavens (1999)

With All Ends (songwriting credits)

- Wasting Life (2007, EP)
- All Ends (2007)
- A Road to Depression (2010)

With The Resistance

- Rise from Treason (2013, EP)
- Scars (2013)

With Cyhra

- Letters to Myself (2017)
- No Halos in Hell (2019)
- Vertigo Trigger (2023)

With The Halo Effect

- Shadowminds (2021, single)
- Feel What I Believe (2022, single)
- Days of the Lost (2022, single)
- The Needless End (2022, single)
- Days of the Lost (2022, album)
- March Of The Unheard (2025, album)

=== Guest appearances ===
- 1997: Withering Surface – "Scarlet Silhouettes": Guitar Solo at "Scarlet Silhouettes"
- 1997: Misanthrope – "Visionnaire": Guitar solo at "Hypochondrium Forces"
- 1998: Exhumation – "Dance Across the Past": Guitar Solo at "Images of Our Extinction"
- 1999: Grievance – "The Phantom Novels"
- 2007: Annihilator – "Metal": Guitar Solo at "Haunted"
- 2013: Angelica – "Thrive": Guitar Solo at "I Am Strong"
- 2013/2014: Nightrage – Session Live
