= Days of the Lost =

Studio album by The Halo Effect
- Released: 12 August 2022
- Studio: Crehate Studios
- Genre: Melodic death metal
- Length: 40:46
- Label: Nuclear Blast
- Producer: Oscar Nilsson & The Halo Effect

The Halo Effect chronology
Days of the Lost (2022)	March of the Unheard (2025)

Singles from Days of the Lost
- 1. "Shadowminds" Released: 9 November 2021; 2. "Feel What I Believe" Released: 21 January 2022; 3. "Days of the Lost" Released: 13 April 2022; 4. "The Needless End" Released: 13 April 2022

Professional ratings
Review scores
Source	Rating
Imperiumi	9/10
Inferno	4/5 stars
Kaaoszine	4/5 stars
Soundi	3/5 stars

Days of the Lost is the debut album by melodic death metal band The Halo Effect, released on 12 August 2022.

The album debuted at number 6 on the Finnish official album chart and number 2 on the physical album chart. In Sweden, it went straight to number one, reportedly becoming the first debut album by a metal band to reach number one on the Swedish charts.

== Track listing ==
No.	Title	Length
1.	"Shadowminds"	3:53
2.	"Days of the Lost"	3:37
3.	"The Needless End"	4:04
4.	"Conditional"	3:41
5.	"In Broken Trust"	4:09
6.	"Gateways"	4:49
7.	"A Truth Worth Lying For"	4:24
8.	"Feel What I Believe"	3:59
9.	"Last of Our Kind" (featuring Matt Heafy)	4:04
10.	"The Most Alone"	4:03
Total length:		40:46

== Personnel ==
Credits retrieved from the official booklet

The Halo Effect

- Mikael Stanne – vocals
- Niclas Engelin – lead guitar
- Jesper Strömblad – rhythm guitar
- Peter Iwers – bass guitar
- Daniel Svensson – drums

Additional musicians

- Örjan Örnkloo – keys & sounds except outro on track 1 by Jesper Strömblad
- Johannes Bergion & Erika Risinger – cello & violin on track 9
- Jonas Slättung – backing vocals on track 5
- Matt Heafy – guest vocals on track 9

Additional personnel

- Oscar Nilsson – recording, engineering & producing
- Jens Bogren – mixing
- Tony Lindgren – mastering
- Adrian Baxter – artwork
- Vincent Laine – logo & symbol
- Niklas Sundin – layout
- Lucas Englund – band photography
- Robin Lundin – individual shots
- Sony/ATV – publishing
- Ride or Crash – management
- Crown Law – legal
- Cobra Agency – bookings Europe, Asia & Australia
- Sound Talent Agency – bookings USA & Canada
- Victorious Merch – merchandise

== Charts ==
Chart performance for Days of the Lost
Chart (2022)	Peak position
Austrian Albums (Ö3 Austria)	6
Belgian Albums (Ultratop Wallonia)	134
Finnish Albums (Suomen virallinen lista)	6
French Albums (SNEP)	176
German Albums (Offizielle Top 100)	6
Scottish Albums (OCC)	29
Spanish Albums (PROMUSICAE)	86
Swedish Albums (Sverigetopplistan)	1
Swiss Albums (Schweizer Hitparade)	8
UK Album Downloads (OCC)	40
UK Independent Albums (OCC)	10
UK Rock & Metal Albums (OCC)	3
