= Hardcore Superstar (album) =

2005 hard rock album by Hardcore Superstar

Studio album by Hardcore Superstar
- Released: 2 November 2005
- Recorded: June–July 2005
- Genre: Hard rock
- Length: 48:47
- Label: Gain (SE)
- Producer: Adde, Johan Reivén, Risza, Martin Sandvik

Hardcore Superstar chronology
No Regrets (2003)	Hardcore Superstar (2005)	Dreamin' in a Casket (2007)

Professional ratings
Review scores
Source	Rating
Sputnikmusic	link

Hardcore Superstar is the fifth studio album released in November 2005 by Swedish hard rock band Hardcore Superstar on the record label Gain. It placed #12 on the Swedish album chart and, in 2011, Sweden Rock Magazine name Hardcore Superstar the 3rd best album of the 2000s. The album was re-released in October 2009 with Nuclear Blast and included "Kick On The Upper Class (Rehearsal Take)," "We Don't Celebrate Sundays (Rehearsal Take)," and "Wild Boys (demo)" as bonus tracks.

== Track listing ==
Title	Length	Notes	Ref
"Kick On the Upper Class"	5:34		
"Bag On Your Head"	3:59		
"Last Forever"	4:13		
"She's Offbeat"	3:15		
"We Don't Celebrate Sundays"	3:49		
"Hateful"	4:13		
"Wild Boys"	3:55	Released as a single in June 2005; reached #11 on Swedish singles charts	
"My Good Reputation"	4:03		
"Cry Your Eyes Out"	4:09		
"Simple Man"	3:28		
"Blood On Me"	3:15		
"Standin' On The Verge"	4:47		
"GTO (Girls Together Outrageously"	5:14	Japanese bonus track	
"We Don't Celebrate Sundays (Rehearsal Take)"	4:26		

== Personnel ==
=== Principal band members ===
- Jocke Berg - vocals
- Thomas Silver - guitar
- Martin Sandvik - bass, backing vocals, production
- Magnus "Adde" Andreasson - drums, percussion, backing vocals, production

=== Additional musicians and production ===
- Anders Ehlin - Moog synthesizer, Roland System 100, mellotron
- Ralf Gyllenhammar (of B-Thong) - backing vocals
- Oscar Carlquist (of RAM) - backing vocals
- Tomas Brandt - backing vocals
- Johan Reivén (of LOK) - backing vocals, percussion, mixing, production
- Risza - mixing, production
- Martin Westerstrand (of LOK) - backing vocals
- Daniel Cordero (of LOK} - backing vocals
- Olof Lindgren (of Distorted Wonderland) - backing vocals
- Axel Karlsson (of Distorted Wonderland) - backing vocals
- Markus Tagaris - A&R; backing vocals, bass on "Wild Boys," arranging
- Maria "Vampirella" Lyttkens (of Notre Dame)- backing vocals
- Magnus Lundbäck - manager, A&R, arranging
- Dragan Tanaskovic - mastering
- Jani Peteri - artwork
- Emma Svensson - photography
- Klaudio Eskudero - illustrations
