= Ut ur discot och in i verkligheten =

Studio album by LOK
- Released: 2002
- Genre: Nu metal, rapcore
- Length: 34:46

LOK chronology
Sunk 500 (2000)	Ut ur discot och in i verkligheten (2002)	Blästrad levande (2003)

Ut ur discot och in i verkligheten is the third album by hardcore band LOK, released in 2002.

== Track listing ==
1. "Scudmissil (den lede fi)" - 2.50
2. "Oj oj oj (hej då klick)" - 4.47
3. "Ta stryk" - 2.22
4. "Pyromandåd i ponnyslakteriet" - 3.17
5. "Resterna av ditt liv" - 3.46
6. "Jag tar för mig" - 2.26
7. "Taftamanabag" - 2.25
8. "Kom och se" - 4.34
9. "Inte en enda risk" - 1.08
10. "Kapten Blau.Pf" - 1.44
11. "Håll käften" - 0.19
12. "Sug min" - 5.03

== Credits ==
=== Band ===
- Martin Westerstrand – Vocals
- Thomas Brandt – Guitar
- Daniel Cordero – Bass
- Johan Reivén – Drums
