= Metaltown =

Metal music festival in Gothenburg, Sweden

Coordinates: 57.71751°N 11.95825°E

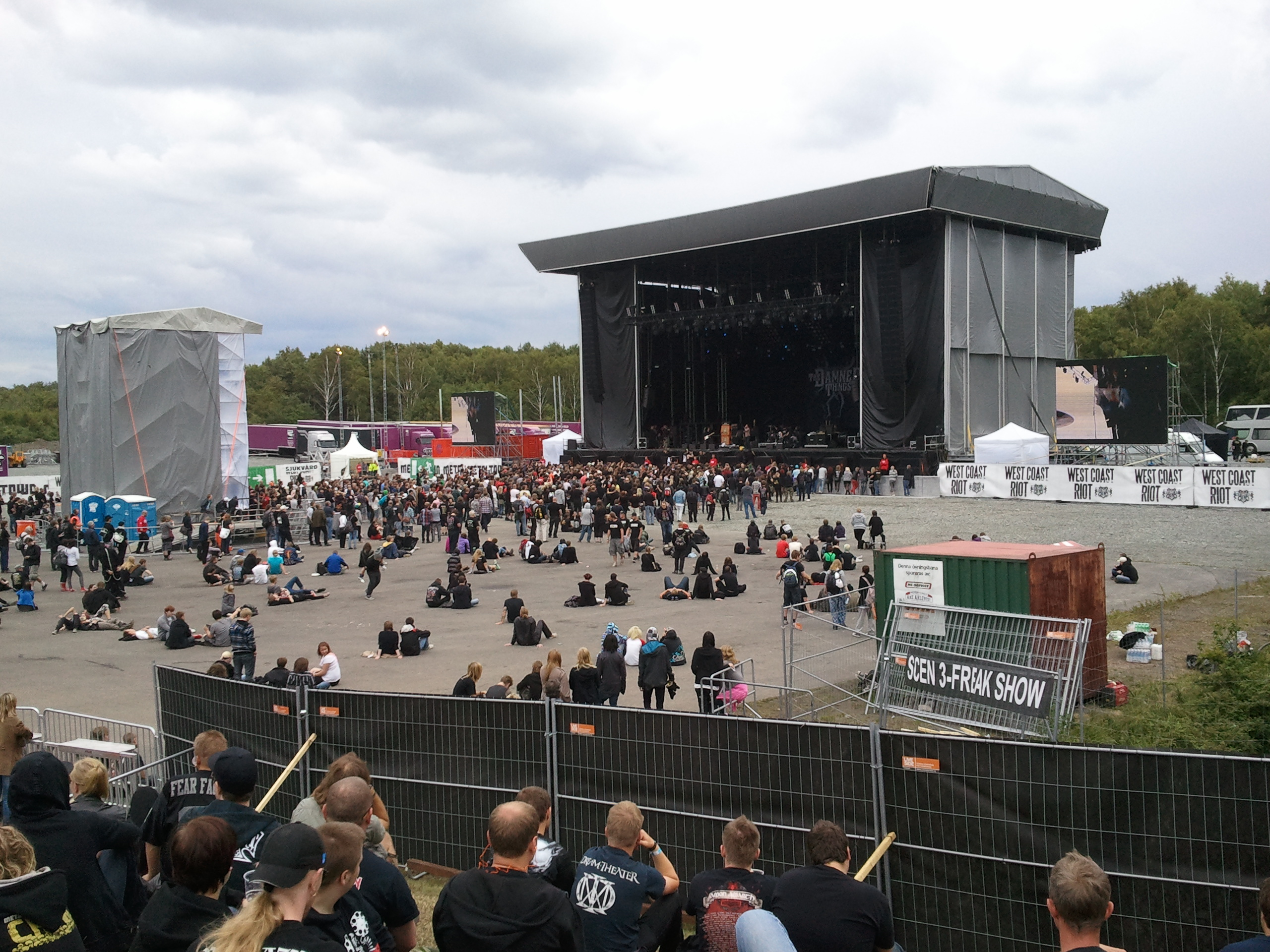
- The Black Stage, one of the two main stages, in 2011
- Genre: Heavy metal, hardcore punk
- Dates: June–July; 2004–2012: 2 days 2013–2016: 3 days
- Locations: Gothenburg, Sweden
- Years active: 2004–2016
- Website: Metaltown In English

The Metaltown festival was a three-day festival featuring heavy metal bands, held in Gothenburg, Sweden. It was arranged annually from 2004 to 2013.

The original Metaltown venue was at Frihamnen, but was moved in 2011 to Göteborg Galopp close to Gothenburg City Airport. An indoor revival was held in 2016 at Trädgår'n. An attempted revival in 2020 to be held at Frihamnen was canceled due to the COVID-19 pandemic.

== Participating acts ==
=== 2004 ===
Alice Cooper – Totalt Jävla Mörker – Turbonegro – Dimmu Borgir – Brides of Destruction – In Flames – Kee Marcello's K2 – Evergrey – Mustasch – Edguy – Within Y – Debase – Notre Dame

=== 2005 ===
Apocalyptica – Dark Tranquillity – Hanoi Rocks – HammerFall – Rammstein – Beseech – Enter the Hunt – Tiamat – Sentenced – Nine – All Ends – Kakaphonia – Hell N' Diesel

=== 2006 ===
Cradle of Filth – Danko Jones – Electric Earth – Engel – Enter the Hunt – Entombed – Evergrey – Fingerspitzengefühl – Khoma – Manimal – Motörhead – Opeth – Satyricon – Soilwork – Sparzanza – The Haunted – Tool – Stonegard

=== 2007 ===
Slayer – Mastodon – Machine Head – Meshuggah – Raised Fist – Nine – Cult of Luna – Hardcore Superstar – Sturm und Drang – Sonic Syndicate – Marduk – Ill Niño – Candlemass – Entombed

=== 2008 ===
In Flames – Cavalera Conspiracy – Nightwish – Chris Cornell (cancelled) – Monster Magnet – Dimmu Borgir – Danko Jones – Bullet for My Valentine – Converge – Dark Tranquillity – Finntroll – Hardcore Superstar – Sabaton – Soilwork – Tiamat – Amon Amarth – Clutch – Job for a Cowboy (cancelled) – Opeth (cancelled) – Killswitch Engage – Nifelheim – Die Mannequin – Graveyard – Sonic Syndicate – Lillasyster – Path of No Return – Sic – Witchcraft – Cimmerian Dome – Dr. Livingdead – Keld – Torture Division – Dead by April – Avatar – Marionette – Satyricon – The Brother Grim Side Show

=== 2009 ===
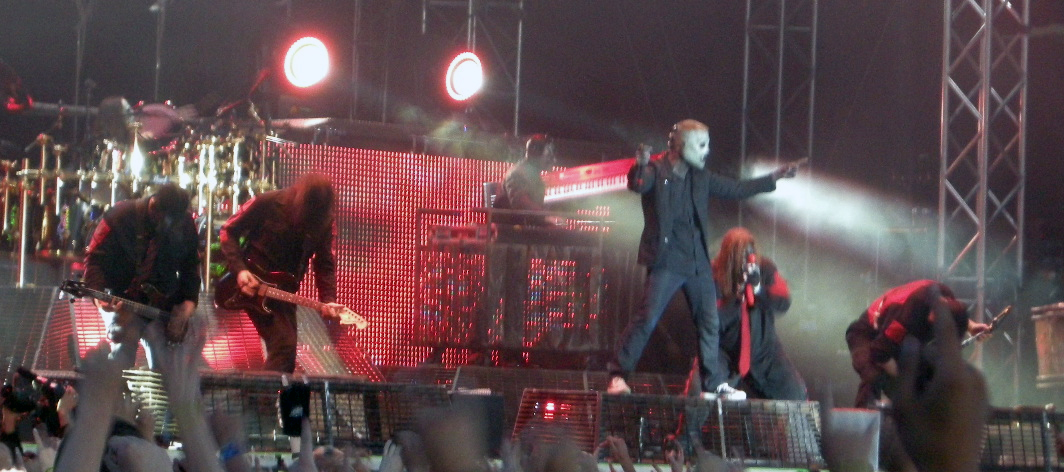
Slipknot performing at Metaltown Festival in 2009.

All Hell – All That Remains – August Burns Red – Bring Me the Horizon – Bullet – Children of Bodom – Cult of Luna – Dead by April – Dir En Grey – Disturbed – DragonForce – Evergrey – Girugamesh – Hatesphere – Hellzapoppin' – Illfigure – Marilyn Manson – Meshuggah – Mucc – Municipal Waste – Mustasch – My Dying Bride – Napalm Death – Opeth – Pain – Pilgrimz – Slipknot – Sterbhaus – Trivium – The Haunted – Volbeat

=== 2010 ===
69 Eyes – Adept – Amon Amarth – Between the Buried and Me – Bleeding Through – Brian "Head" Welch – Bullet for My Valentine – Coheed & Cambria – Cynic – Dark Tranquillity – Dream Evil – Finntroll – From This Moment – Garcia Plays Kyuss – Hatebreed – Hellyeah – In Flames – Katatonia – Kreator – Nile – Rammstein – Raunchy – Raubtier – Sabaton – Skindred – Sodom – Sonic Syndicate – Soulfly – Walking with Strangers

=== 2011 ===
Meshuggah – Humanity's Last Breath – Cradle of Filth – Raubtier – Parkway Drive – Escape the Fate – System of a Down – At the Gates – The Black Dahlia Murder – Graveyard – Soilwork – Ghost – Volbeat – Watain – Korn – Khoma – Cavalera Conspiracy – All That Remains – Doctor Midnight & The Mercy Cult – F.K.Ü – Deicide – Bring Me the Horizon – Arch Enemy – Avenged Sevenfold – Anvil – Bullet – Human Desolation – Madball – Corroded- Yersinia – Last View – Stillwell – Avenir

=== 2012 ===
In Flames – Slayer – Marilyn Manson – Machine Head – Lamb of God – Mastodon – Killswitch Engage – Opeth – Within Temptation – Sabaton – Anthrax – Kyuss Lives! – HammerFall – Nasum – Dark Tranquility – Mayhem – Soulfly – Candlemass – Hypocrisy – Vader – Gojira – Trivium – Pain – DevilDriver – Pain of Salvation – Oz – Darkest Hour – Adept – Skeletonwitch – Engel – Avatar – Vildhjarta – Skitarg – Unleashed – Primordial – Death Destruction – Shining – Aura Noir – Descend – Unpure – Year of the Goat – Sectu – Kobra and the Lotus – Seventribe – Dethrone – Who Torched Cinderella – Alenah – Voiceless Location – Start a Fire – Imminence – Jason Rouse

=== 2013 ===
Slipknot – Korn – Motörhead – Sabaton – Danzig – Ghost – Meshuggah – All That Remains – Danko Jones – Soilwork – Turbonegro – Asking Alexandria – Clutch – Graveyard – Entombed – Napalm Death – Carcass – The Dillinger Escape Plan – Pentagram – Marduk – Kvelertak – Cult of Luna – The Devil Wears Prada – The Ghost Inside – Between the Buried and Me – The Sword – Witchcraft – Hardcore Superstar – Katatonia – Amaranthe – Love and Death – Naglfar – The Kristet Utseende – The Resistance – Thyrfing – Terra Tenebrosa – Bombus – Thundermother – Eldkraft – Port Noir – Undercroft – Sister Sin – Constrain – Crunge – Imber – Nox Vorago – Degial – Tribulation – Eldrimner – Minora – bravo metal – bedeng metal
