= Granstedt =

Granstedt is a surname. Notable people with the surname include:

- Anette Granstedt (born 1968), Swedish orienteering competitor
- Daniel Granstedt (born 1975), Swedish guitarist
- Greta Granstedt (1907–1987), American actress
- Kerstin Granstedt, Swedish orienteering competitor
- Pär Granstedt (born 1945), Swedish politician
