= Headplate =

Swedish nu metal band

- Origin: Gothenburg, Sweden
- Genres: Nu metal; alternative metal; rap metal
- Years active: 1993–present
- Label: Gain
- Members: Daniel Granstedt, Niklas Österlund, Jens Sanderoth, Erik Wood
- Website: headplate.com

Headplate is a Swedish nu metal band from the city of Gothenburg. The band was formed in 1993, by drummer Niklas Österlund and guitarist Daniel (Schou) Granstedt. Almost all of their songs are free to download on their website.

In 1999 the band signed with Gain Productions / Gain Recordings, also from Gothenburg, Sweden. Headplate performed at several Scandinavian festivals during 2001 and 2002, for instance, Hultsfredsfestivalen 2001 and Tuska Open Air Metal Festival in 2001. During these years they also did a couple of shows as the supported act for Hardcore Superstar, LOK, and Machine Head. The band has released four studio albums: Bullsized (2000), Delicate (2002), 12-12-12 (2012) and Elements (2023).

== Discography ==
=== Albums ===
- Sleepy (1998, demo album, no label)
- Bullsized (2000, studio album, Gain Productions/Gain Recordings)
- Delicate (2002, studio album, Gain Productions/Gain Recordings)
- Pieces (2003, compilation, Gain Productions/Gain Recordings)
- 12-12-12 (2012, studio album, DGS / DGS)
- Elements (2023, studio album, HEADPLATE/HEADPLATE)

=== Singles ===
- "Fire" (2023, self-released)
- "Water" (2023, self-released)
- "Air" (2023, self-released)
- "Earth" (2023, self-released)
- "Aether" (2023, self-released)

=== Videos ===
- "Bullsized" (2000)
- "Feel Like Porn" (2001)
- "Jump the Bridge" (2002)

== Lineup ==
=== Members ===
- Daniel Granstedt - guitars, backing vocals (1993–present)
- Niklas Österlund - drums (1993–present)
- Håkan Skoger - bass (1994-2003, 2012–present)
- Johan Andreassen - bass (2003-2005, 2012–present)
- Hezzy - vocals (2012–present)

=== Former members ===
- Magnus Klavborn - vocals (1998-2005) (former lead singer of Engel)
- Marcus Österlund - bass (1993-1994), guitars (1994-1999)
- DJ Shortcut - turntablist (1994-2003)
