= Passenger (Swedish band) =

Swedish metal band

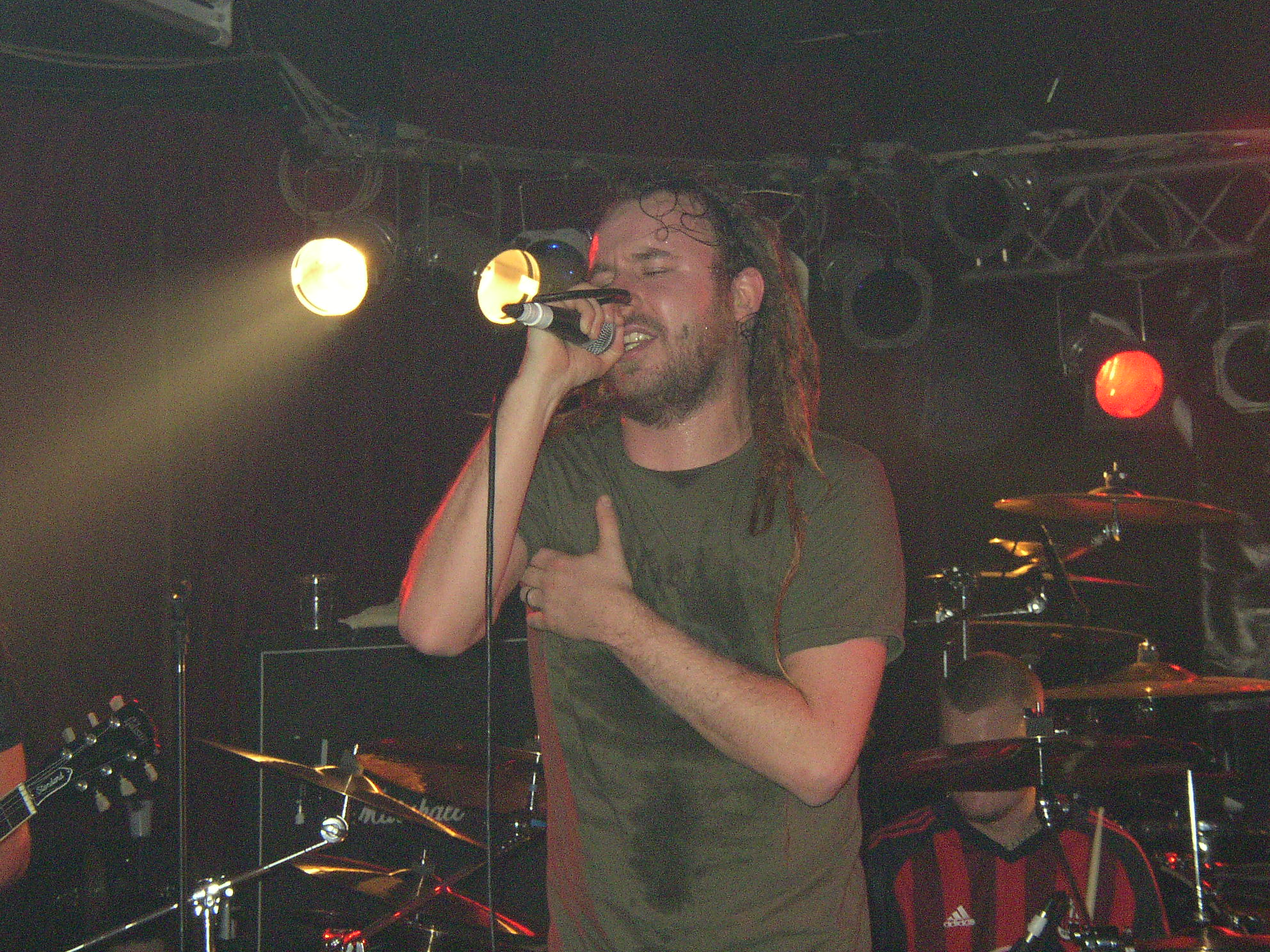
- Anders Fridén performing with Passenger

Background information
- Also known as: Cliff (originally)
- Origin: Sweden
- Genres: Alternative metal
- Years active: 1995–2004
- Members: Anders Fridén; Patrik J. Sten; Niklas Engelin; Håkan Skoger

Passenger was a Swedish alternative metal band active between 1995 and 2004.

== History ==
Passenger was formed in 1995 by Sten and Engelin. Both members wanted to do something that was not thrash metal or melodic death metal unlike the bands they played in. At its early stages the band was originally called Cliff. Under the name Cliff they recorded two demos in Studio Fredman that were never released. After a break in the band and after Engelin was hired as a session guitarist for In Flames' Whoracle tour, Anders Fridén, the vocalist of In Flames showed interest in Passenger and joined the band.

In 2000, the band came back from its break and went on to record a demo. In 2001, the band recorded another demo in which early versions of the songs "Used", "In My Head", "Circus" and "Drowning City" were recorded. After a third demo the band finally recorded and released their debut album entitled Passenger. A video for "In Reverse" was also released. They did their only tour during New Year's period of 2003/2004, opening for Lacuna Coil, with Moonspell and Poisonblack.

Sten noted in February 2004 on their official website that they were in the process of recording their second album. However, since then, Fridén, lead vocalist of both Passenger and In Flames has been noted saying that he has little time for the project, due to other commitments, and the group has split up as a result. In an interview with Fridén he stated that as soon as he gets a break from In Flames, he wants to get all the group together to record a second album for early 2010. This however, did not happen as Anders continued touring with In Flames until October 2010 when they entered their studio to record their next album.

As of 2013, a decade after the band released their self-titled debut album, there has not been any activity in regards to regrouping. However, an interview with Unsung Melody, Fridén has acknowledged that there has been some minor activity, but nothing solid.

== Band members ==
- Anders Fridén – vocals
- Patrik J. Sten – drums
- Niklas Engelin – guitar
- Håkan Skoger – bass

== Discography ==
Title	Release date	Label
"In Reverse" (single)	2003	Century Media
Passenger	2003	Century Media

== See also ==
- In Flames
- Gardenian
- Gothenburg metal
- Alternative metal
