= Blästrad levande =

Live album by LOK
- Released: 2003
- Recorded: 14 August 2002
- Genre: Hardcore
- Length: 56:57
- Producer: Johan Reivén

LOK chronology
Ut ur discot och in i verkligheten (2002)	Blästrad levande (2003)

Blästrad levande is a live album by hardcore band LOK, released in February 24, 2003. It was recorded live on August 14th, 2002 at Heden in Gothenburg, Sweden.

== Track listing ==
1. "Intro"
2. "Kompanjoner"
3. "Hur många grisar är vi nu?"
4. "Scudmissil (den lede fi)"
5. "Skrubbsår"
6. "Oj oj oj (hejdå klick)"
7. "Passa dig"
8. "Stänkskärmar och sprit"
9. "Lägg av"
10. "Sug min"
11. "Ta stryk"
12. "Bedragaren i Murmansk"
13. "Taftamanabag"
14. "Tommys ponny"
15. "Ensam gud"
16. "Staden Göteborg"
17. "LOK står när de andra faller"
18. "Rosa"
19. "Outro"

== Credits ==
- Martin Westerstrand – Vocals
- Thomas Brandt – Guitar
- Daniel Cordero – Bass
- Johan Reivén – Drums
