= Daniel Granstedt =

Swedish musician

Daniel (Schou) Granstedt
- Born: 27 December 1975; Sweden, Gothenburg
- Occupation(s): Musician (guitarist); Producer; Sound engineer

Daniel (Schou) Granstedt, guitarist and member of the Swedish metal band Headplate. He has also co-produced, mixed and recorded all their three albums. And also worked with Hardcore Superstar, Brassmonkey and Absent among others.

== Discography ==
- 1998: Brassmonkey - Brassmonkey — engineering
- 1998: Hardcore Superstar - It's Only Rock'n'Roll — engineering
- 2000: Headplate - Bullsized — guitars, engineering, mixing, production
- 2002: Headplate - Delicate — guitars, engineering, mixing, production
- 2003: Headplate - Pieces — guitars, engineering, mixing, production
- 2006: Absent - Euphoria — engineering, mixing, production
- 2012: Red Bled The Sun - I — engineering, mixing, production
- 2012: Headplate - 12-12-12 — engineering, mixing, mastering, production
- 2013: Benevolent - The Wave — engineering, mixing, production
