= March of the Unheard =

Studio album by The Halo Effect
- Released: 10 January 2025
- Genre: Melodic death metal
- Length: 44:06
- Label: Nuclear Blast

The Halo Effect chronology
Days of the Lost (2022)	March of the Unheard (2025)

Singles from March of the Unheard
- 1. "Detonate" Released: 25 September 2024; 2. "March of the Unheard" Released: 29 October 2024; 3. "Cruel Perception" Released: 3 December 2024; 4. "What We Become" Released: 10 January 2025

Professional ratings
Review scores
Source	Rating
All About the Rock	8/10
Ghost Cult Magazine	8/10
Kaaoszine	3.5/5 stars
Louder Sound	4/5 stars

March of the Unheard is the second studio album by Swedish melodic death metal band The Halo Effect, released on 10 January 2025, through Nuclear Blast. The album's first single, "Detonate" was released on 25 September 2024. A music video was released for "What We Become" on the same day as the album's release.

== Track listing ==
No.	Title	Length
1.	"Conspire to Deceive"	3:57
2.	"Detonate"	3:58
3.	"Our Channel to the Darkness"	3:28
4.	"Cruel Perception"	4:04
5.	"What We Become"	3:46
6.	"This Curse of Silence"	2:00
7.	"March of the Unheard"	2:59
8.	"Forever Astray"	3:40
9.	"Between Directions"	4:28
10.	"A Death That Becomes Us"	4:06
11.	"The Burning Point"	3:47
12.	"Coda"	3:53
Total length:		44:06

European bonus tracks
No.	Title	Length
13.	"Path of Fierce Resistance"	3:39
14.	"The Defiant One"	3:11
15.	"Become Surrender"	3:34
Total length:		54:37

== Personnel ==
- Mikael Stanne – vocals
- Niclas Engelin – guitar
- Jesper Strömblad – guitar
- Peter Iwers – bass
- Daniel Svensson – drums

== Charts ==
Chart performance for March of the Unheard
Chart (2025)	Peak position
Austrian Albums (Ö3 Austria)	4
Finnish Albums (Suomen virallinen lista)	8
German Albums (Offizielle Top 100)	4
Japanese Albums (Oricon)	26
Scottish Albums (OCC)	21
Swedish Albums (Sverigetopplistan)	3
Swiss Albums (Schweizer Hitparade)	8
UK Album Downloads (OCC)	48
UK Independent Albums (OCC)	7
UK Rock & Metal Albums (OCC)	4
