= Naken, blästrad och skitsur =

Studio album by LOK
- Released: 1999
- Genre: Hardcore
- Length: 40:31
- Label: Sonet Grammofon
- Producer: Roberto Laghi; Johan Reiven

LOK chronology
Ord och inga visor (1996)	Naken, blästrad och skitsur (1999)	Sunk 500 (2000)

Naken, blästrad och skitsur is the first album by the Swedish hardcore band LOK.

== Track listing ==
1. "Lokpest" (Lok Plague) – 2:13
2. "Skrubbsår" (Grazes) – 2:45
3. "Låt 3ton" (Song Thirteen/Let Three Tons)- 4:21
4. "LOK står när de andra faller" (LOK Stands While Others Fall)– 2:24
5. "Passa dig" (Watch It) – 1:32
6. "Barnbok" (Children's Book)– 5:11
7. "Ensam gud" (Lone God) – 2:25
8. "Experiment" – 3:18
9. "Hem till gården" (Back Home at the farm) – 3:42
10. "Tommys ponny (bröderna Cartwright)" (Tommy's Pony [The Brothers Cartwright])– 2:39
11. "Som en hund" (Like a Dog)– 3:53
12. "Natten till i morgon" (All Night Long)– 6:03

== Credits ==
- Martin Westerstrand – Vocals
- Thomas Brandt – Guitar
- Daniel Cordero – Bass
- Johan Reivén – Drums
