= Beg for It =

Beg for It may refer to:

- Beg for It (album), a 2009 album by Hardcore Superstar
- "Beg for It" (song), a 2014 song by Iggy Azalea
- "Beg for It", a 2011 song by Chris Brown from F.A.M.E.
