= December 12, 2012 =

December 12, 2012 was the 12th day in December, 2012. Depending on context, the date may refer to:

- World Hoop Day
- Aaron Rodgers Day in Wisconsin
- The last consecutive date until 01/01/2101
- 12-12-12: The Concert for Sandy Relief, a concert held at Madison Square Garden in New York City on December 12, 2012
  - 12-12-12, a documentary film about the concert
- Independence Day in Kenya: Anniversary for the Republic of Kenya
- 12-12-12 (album), a Headplate album
- 12/12/12 (film), a 2012 horror film
- 12 12 12, an upcoming heist television series
