= Ord och inga visor =

EP by LOK
- Released: 1996
- Recorded: 1996 in Studio Fredman, Gothenburg
- Genre: Hardcore
- Length: 20:58
- Producers: LOK & Fredrik Nordström

LOK chronology
Ord och inga visor (1996)	Naken, blästrad och skitsur (1999)

Ord och inga visor is an EP by Gothenburg band LOK. It was released in 1996.

== Track listing ==
1. "Experiment" - 3.26
2. "Som en hund" (Like A Dog) - 4.31
3. "Rosa" (Pink) - 3.35
4. "Natten till imorgon (den här är till Dig)" (All Night Long (This One Is For You))- 5.22
5. "Plyschbeklädd" (Dressed In Velour) - 1.56
6. "Rosendröm" (Dream Of Roses) - 2.08

== Credits ==
- Martin Westerstrand – Vocals
- Thomas Brandt – Guitar
- Daniel Cordero – Bass
- Johan Reivén – Drums
