= It's Only Rock and Roll =

It's Only Rock and Roll may refer to:

- It's Only Rock 'n Roll, a 1974 album by The Rolling Stones
  - "It's Only Rock 'n Roll (But I Like It)", a 1974 song and lead single from the above album
- It's Only Rock & Roll (Waylon Jennings album), a 1983 album by Waylon Jennings
- It's Only Rock 'n' Roll (Hardcore Superstar album), a 1997 album by Hardcore Superstar
- "It's Only Rock and Roll" (Only Fools and Horses), a 1985 episode of the British sitcom, Only Fools and Horses
- It's Only Rock & Roll (TV series), a Canadian television variety show, which aired on CBC Television as a summer series in 1987
- It's Only Rock 'n' Roll (video game), a 1983 video game by K-Tel International released for the ZX Spectrum, Commodore 64, and ColecoVision
