= Lillasyster =

Swedish band

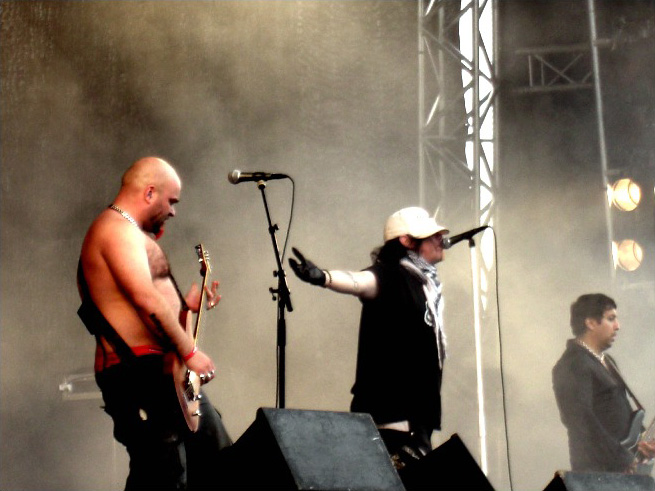
- Max Flövik, Martin Westerstrand and Daniel Cordero of Lillasyster at Metaltown 2008

Background information
- Origin: Gothenburg, Sweden
- Genres: Alternative metal, hard rock, nu metal, hardcore punk
- Years active: 2004 — present
- Labels: Gain Music Entertainment
- Members: Martin Westerstrand; Max Flövik; Daniel Cordero; Ian-Paolo Lira
- Website: lillasyster.nu

Lillasyster is a Swedish rock band formed in Gothenburg in 2006. They released their debut album, Hjärndöd musik för en hjärndöd generation (Braindead Music For A Braindead Generation) in May 2007.

== History ==
Lillasyster (meaning Little Sister) was formed as Rallypack in 2004, by former LOK members Martin Westerstrand (lead vocals) and Daniel Cordero (bass). After a while, Rallypack changed the name to Lillasyster. In February 2007 their first single "Berätta det för Lina" ("Tell It to Lina" in English) was released and in May 2007 they released their first album. They are also known for their cover versions of R&B star Rihanna's "Umbrella" the same year (2007) and Katy Perry's "Roar" (2014) which became successful. The style of Lillasyster's music is very similar to LOK's music.

They participated in Melodifestivalen 2021 with the song "Pretender", qualifying to the second chance round on 6 February 2021. They performed again on 6 March 2021 but failed to progress to the final.

They returned to Melodifestivalen the following year, entering the 2022 edition with the song "Till Our Days Are Over". They performed on 26 February 2022, finishing fourth in the first round and progressing to the semi-final. They performed again on 5 March 2022 but finished fourth, failing to qualify to the final.

On 13 May 2024, the band announced via social media that their upcoming album "Tack and Förlåt" will be their last and that the album's supporting tour will be a farewell tour.

== Discography ==
=== Studio albums ===
- Sod Off, God! We Believe in Our Rockband (2004) (as Rallypack)
- Hjärndöd musik för en hjärndöd generation (2007)
- Det Här Är Inte Musik Det Här Är Kärlek (2009)
- 3 (2012)
- 4 (2016)
- Svensk Jävla Metal (2021)
- Stormtrooper Boombox (2023)

=== Compilation albums ===
- Hjärndöd Kärlek (2010)
- Tala är silver, skrika är guld (2013)

=== EPs ===
- Svensk Jävla Metal (2018)

=== Singles ===
- "Berätta det för Lina" (2007)
- "Rad efter Rad (Dreamhack Anthem)" (2009)
- "Jag Är Här Nu" (2009)"
- "Så jävla bra" (2011)"

=== Videos ===
- "Berätta det för Lina" (2007)
- "Umbrella ella ella" (Rihanna cover) (2007)

=== Charting singles ===
Title	Year	Peak chart positions	Album
Title	Year	SWE	Album
"Pretender"	2021	22	Melodifestivalen 2021
"Till Our Days Are Over"	2022	20	Melodifestivalen 2022

== Members ==
- Martin Westerstrand - Lead vocals
- Max Flövik - Guitar
- Andy OhMyGod - Bass
- Ian-Paolo Lira - Drums

== Other contributors ==
- Thomas Silver - Additional guitars

Daniel Cordero left the band in 2011 and Andy Oh'MyGOD has taken the place as bass player now.
