= Thank You (For Letting Us Be Ourselves) =

Studio album by Hardcore Superstar
- Released: 22 October 2001
- Genre: Sleaze rock
- Label: Music for Nations
- Producer: Roberto Laghi

Hardcore Superstar chronology
Bad Sneakers and a Piña Colada (2000)	Thank You (For Letting Us Be Ourselves) (2001)	No Regrets (2003)

Professional ratings
Review scores
Source	Rating
Rock Sound	4/5 stars

Thank You (For Letting Us Be Ourselves) is the third full-length album by Swedish hard rock band Hardcore Superstar, released by the Music for Nations record label.

== Track listing ==
1. "That's My Life" – 3:12
2. "Not Dancing, Wanna Know Why?" – 3:02
3. "Shame" – 4:23
4. "Just Another Score" – 3:33
5. "Summer Season's Gone" – 4:10
6. "Wimpy Sister" – 3:29
7. "Do Me That Favour" – 3:29
8. "Significant Other" – 3:34
9. "Dear Old Fame" – 4:58
10. "Smoke 'Em" – 4:16
11. "Riding With The King" – 4:18
12. "They Are Not Even A New Bang Tango" – 2:35
13. "Mother's Love" – 5:49
14. "A Long Way To Go" (Japanese bonus track) – 3:02
15. "Things On Fire" (Japanese bonus track) – 3:18
16. "Staden Göteborg (feat. LOK)" – 2:54
