= Absolute Design =

Studio album by Engel
- Released: 31 October 2007 (EU); 20 May 2008 (NA)
- Recorded: Dug Out Studios, Uppsala, Sweden
- Genre: Melodic death metal, industrial metal
- Length: 46:40
- Label: SPV/Steamhammer
- Producer: Anders Fridén, Daniel Bergstrand

Engel chronology
Demo 2006 (2006)	Absolute Design (2007)	Threnody (2010)

Professional ratings
Review scores
Source	Rating
AllMusic	3/5 stars

Absolute Design is the debut album by Swedish melodic death metal band Engel. It was released in Europe on 31 October 2007 and in North America on 20 May 2008. Music videos were released for the songs "Casket Closing", "Next Closed Door" and "Calling Out".

== Track listing ==
1. "In Splendour" – 3:42
2. "Casket Closing" – 3:27
3. "Next Closed Door" – 3:14
4. "The Hurricane Season" – 3:37
5. "Propaganda" – 3:24
6. "The Paraclete" – 3:25
7. "Scythe" – 4:57
8. "Descend" – 4:51
9. "Trial and Error" – 3:23
10. "I Am the One" – 3:51
11. "Calling Out" – 4:28
12. "Seven Ends" – 4:16

== Credits ==
- Magnus "Mangan" Klavborn – vocals
- Niclas Engelin – guitars
- Marcus Sunesson – guitars
- Michael Håkansson – bass
- Daniel "Mojjo" Moilanen – drums
