= The Halo Effect (band) =

Swedish melodic death metal band

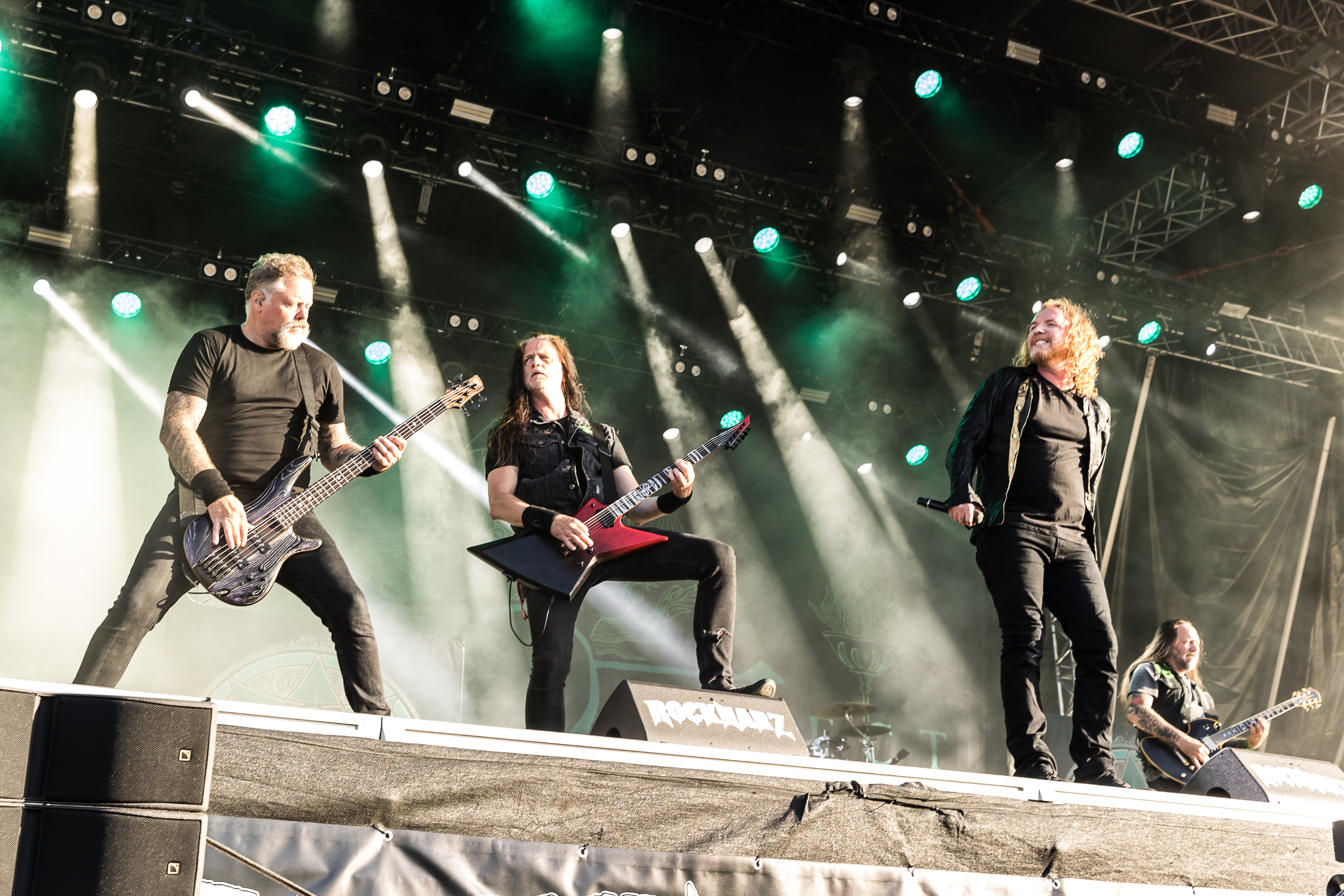
- The Halo Effect at Rockharz 2024

Background information
- Origin: Gothenburg, Sweden
- Genres: Melodic death metal
- Years active: 2019–present
- Label: Nuclear Blast
- Spinoff of: In Flames
- Members: Niclas Engelin; Peter Iwers; Mikael Stanne; Jesper Strömblad; Daniel Svensson
- Website: thehaloeffect.band

The Halo Effect is a Swedish melodic death metal supergroup formed by former members of In Flames. They are signed to the Nuclear Blast label.

== History ==
The Halo Effect was founded in 2019 by five former members of the Swedish metal band In Flames: its founder Jesper Strömblad, early vocalist Mikael Stanne and long-time members Niclas Engelin, Peter Iwers, and Daniel Svensson.

Their stated motivation was to return to the roots of the 1990s "Gothenburg sound" that pioneered the melodic death metal genre. According to an interview, the band's name references the song "Halo Effect" on Rush's album Clockwork Angels.

The band released their debut single "Shadowminds" on 9 November 2021 ahead of their debut album Days of the Lost, released on 12 August 2022. To support the album, the band toured Europe and the UK with Amon Amarth and Machine Head in September and October.

Their second studio album was recorded in 2024 with a tentative release date of early 2025. Its first single "Detonate" was released on 25 September 2024. The album, titled March of the Unheard, was released on 10 January 2025. Later in the year, the band released a covers EP, We Are Shadows, on 21 November.

== Band members ==
Current

- Niclas Engelin – guitars (2019–present)
- Peter Iwers – bass (2019–present)
- Mikael Stanne – vocals (2019–present)
- Jesper Strömblad – guitars (2019–present; not touring)
- Daniel Svensson – drums (2019–present)

Live

- Patrik Jensen – guitars (2022–present)
- Anton Roos – drums (2023)

== Discography ==
=== Studio albums ===
- Days of the Lost (2022)
- March of the Unheard (2025)

=== EPs ===
- We Are Shadows (2025)

=== Singles ===
- "Shadowminds" (2021)
- "Feel What I Believe" (2022)
- "Days of the Lost" (2022)
- "The Needless End" (2022)
- "Path of Fierce Resistance" (2023)
- "The Defiant One" (2023)
- "Become Surrender" (2024)
- "Detonate" (2024)
- "March of the Unheard" (2024)
- "Cruel Perception" (2024)
- "How The Gods Kill" (2025)
- "If You Were Here" (2025)
- "Lest We Fall (feat. Heaven Shall Burn & The Black Dahlia Murder)" (2026)
