= Two Feet Stand =

Studio album by Gardenian
- Released: 1997
- Recorded: Studio Fredman Late 1996
- Genre: Melodic death metal
- Length: 41:25
- Label: Listenable Records
- Producer: Fredrik Nordström

Gardenian chronology
Two Feet Stand (1997)	Soulburner (1999)

Two Feet Stand is the debut album by Swedish melodic death metal band Gardenian. It was the only album the band recorded for Listenable Records before signing a deal with Nuclear Blast.

== Track listing ==
1. "Two Feet Stand" - 3:13
2. "Flipside of Reality" - 3:49
3. "The Downfall" - 4:07
4. "Awake of Abuse" - 3:50
5. "Netherworld 3:51
6. "Do Me Now" - 4:07
7. "Murder..." - 3:27
8. "Freedom" - 3:45
9. "Mindless Domination" - 4:03
10. "The Silent Fall" - 3:30
11. "Ecstasy of Life" (bonus track) - 3:43

== Credits ==
- Jim Kjell - vocals, guitars
- Niklas Engelin - guitars
- Håkan Skoger - bass
- Thim Blom - drums

Guest

- Thomas Fredriksson - Keyboard
