= Soulburner =

Studio album by Gardenian
- Released: 9 August 1999
- Recorded: February 1999 (Studio Fredman)
- Genre: Melodic death metal
- Length: 47:23
- Label: Nuclear Blast

Gardenian chronology
Two Feet Stand (1997)	Soulburner (1999)	Sindustries (2000)

Soulburner is the second album by Swedish melodic death metal band Gardenian. It was their first album under the Nuclear Blast banner. This is the last Gardenian release with Håkan Skoger.

== Track listing ==
1. "As a True King" – 3:21
2. "Powertool" – 4:38
3. "Deserted" – 2:58
4. "Soulburner" – 4:09
5. "If Tomorrow's Gone" – 4:37
6. "Small Electric Space" – 5:25
7. "Chaos in Flesh" – 4:09
8. "Ecstasy of Life" – 3:43
9. "Tell the World I'm Sorry" – 5:44
10. "Loss" – 2:13
11. "Black Days" – 6:26

== Credits ==
=== Gardenian ===
- Jim Kjell – vocals, guitars
- Niklas Engelin – guitars
- Håkan Skoger – bass
- Thim Blom – drums

=== Guests ===
- Eric Hawk – clean vocals
- Sabrina Khilstrand – clean vocals
- Thomas Fredriksson – Keyboards
