= Sindustries =

Studio album by Gardenian
- Released: 5 October 2000
- Recorded: The Abyss studio
- Genre: Melodic death metal
- Length: 63:04
- Label: Nuclear Blast
- Producer: Peter Tägtgren

Gardenian chronology
Soulburner (1999)	Sindustries (2000)

Professional ratings
Review scores
Source	Rating
AllMusic	3/5 stars

Sindustries is the third album by Swedish melodic death metal band Gardenian. For a time, this was considered Gardenian's last release, as the band broke up in 2004. However, they reunited in 2012 and are working towards a new album. The band's past album, Soulburner, featured Eric Hawk, who did clean vocals, but producer Peter Tägtgren believed that this album did not need a guest clean vocalist, and encouraged Jim Kjell to the clean vocals this time as he had never done so. This is the first and last release with Kriss Albertsson performing. This album also has the band's longest song, "Selfproclaimed Messiah".

== Track listing ==
1. "Selfproclaimed Messiah" - 8:06
2. "Doom & Gloom" - 6:34
3. "Long Snap to Zero" - 6:07
4. "Courageous" - 4:42
5. "Heartless" - 6:34
6. "The Suffering" - 6:21
7. "Scissorfight" - 5:35
8. "Sonic Death Monkey" - 5:54
9. "Sindustries" - 6:51
10. "Funeral" - 6:20

== Credits ==
Gardenian

- Jim Kjell - vocals, guitars
- Niklas Engelin - guitars
- Kriss Albertsson - bass
- Thim Blom - drums

Guests

- Niklas Sundin - art direction, design
- Lars Szöke - engineer, acoustic guitar
- Peter Tagtgren - keyboards, programming, producing, mixing
