= Bad Sneakers and a Piña Colada =

2000 hard rock album by Hardcore Superstar

Studio album by Hardcore Superstar
- Released: 17 March 2000
- Recorded: Gain Studios, Sweden
- Genre: Sleaze rock, glam metal
- Length: 44:45
- Label: Music for Nations
- Producer: Hardcore Superstar

Hardcore Superstar chronology
It's Only Rock 'n' Roll (1998)	Bad Sneakers and a Piña Colada (2000)	Thank You (For Letting Us Be Ourselves) (2001)

Professional ratings
Review scores
Source	Rating
Brave Words & Bloody Knuckles	8/10 stars
Kerrang!	4/5 stars
Metal Hammer	7/10

Bad Sneakers and a Piña Colada is the second full-length album by Swedish hard rock band Hardcore Superstar, released by Music for Nations. It was the first album to be released internationally and usually considered the first full-length album in general. The title comes from the jazz-rock band Steely Dan's song "Bad Sneakers".

In May 2000, Billboard listed Bad Sneakers as #7 in the top 10 albums in Sweden.

== Track listing ==
No.	Title	Length	Notes	Ref
1	"Hello/Goodbye"	3:06		
2	"You Will Never Know"	3:53		
3	"Liberation"	3:56		
4	"Have You Been Around"	3:48		
5	"Punk Rock Song"	2:47		
6	"Beat You Down"	4:00		
7	"Rock 'N' Roll Star"	3:07		
8	"Someone Special"	4:25	Released as a single	
9	"Slide Song"	3:42		
10	"Hey Now!!"	2:28		
11	"Strapped"	3:12		
12	"Bubblecum Ride"	3:13		
13	"So Deep Inside"	3:16		
14	"Don't You Ever Leave Me"	4:13	Hanoi Rocks cover; Japanese bonus track	
15	"You Say You Want Me"	3:34	From the single "Liberation"	

== Personnel ==
=== Principal band members ===
- Jocke Berg - vocals
- Thomas Silver - guitar
- Martin Sandvik - bass
- Magnus "Adde" Andreasson - drums
