= Split Your Lip =

Studio album by Hardcore Superstar
- Released: Sweden 26 November 2010; UK 29 November 2010
- Genre: Sleaze rock, Heavy metal, Hard rock
- Length: 40:50
- Label: Nuclear Blast (SE); Abstract Sounds (UK)
- Producer: Tobias Lindell

Hardcore Superstar chronology
Beg for It (2009)	Split Your Lip (2010)	C'mon Take on Me (2013)

Professional ratings
Review scores
Source	Rating
Allmusic	3.5/5 stars

Split Your Lip is the eighth studio album by Swedish hard rock band Hardcore Superstar. The album was released in Sweden on 26 November 2010, and in the United Kingdom on 29 November 2010.

== Track listing ==
Standard edition
No.	Title	Length
1.	"Sadistic Girls"	4:06
2.	"Guestlist"	4:02
3.	"Last Call for Alcohol"	3:25
4.	"Split Your Lip"	3:19
5.	"Moonshine"	3:57
6.	"Here Comes that Sick Bitch Again"	3:21
7.	"What Did I Do"	3:51
8.	"Bully"	3:28
9.	"Won't Go to Heaven"	3:04
10.	"Honeymoon"	3:28
11.	"Run to Your Mama"	4:58
Total length:		40:50

Japanese Bonus Track
No.	Title	Length
12.	"Lovin' the Dead"	4:08
Total length:		44:58

== Personnel ==
- Jocke Berg: Vocals
- Vic Zino: Guitars
- Martin Sandvik: Bass and vocals
- Magnus "Adde" Andreasson: Drums

== Charts ==
Chart (2010)	Peak position
German Newcomer Chart	10
