= Dreamin' in a Casket =

Studio album by Hardcore Superstar
- Released: 12 November 2007
- Recorded: July 2007 at IF Studios
- Genre: Glam metal, heavy metal, hard rock
- Length: 50:38
- Label: Gain Records
- Producer: Adde, Martin Sandvik

Hardcore Superstar chronology
| Hardcore Superstar (2005) | Dreamin' in a Casket (2007) | Beg For It (2009) |

Professional ratings
Review scores
| Source | Rating |
|---|---|
| Allmusic | 4/5 stars |
| Hard Rock Hide Out | link |

Dreamin' in a Casket is the sixth full-length album by Swedish hard rock band Hardcore Superstar. It is the band's last release with guitarist Thomas Silver, and their last on Gain Records before switching to Nuclear Blast.

== Track listing ==
| No. | Title | Length |
|---|---|---|
| 1. | "Need No Company" | 5:21 |
| 2. | "Medicate Me" | 3:30 |
| 3. | "Dreamin' in a Casket" | 4:15 |
| 4. | "Silence for the Peacefully" | 4;18 |
| 5. | "Sophisticated Ladies" | 3:25 |
| 6. | "Wake Up Dead in a Garbage Can" | 4:04 |
| 7. | "Spreadin' the News" | 4:33 |
| 8. | "This Is for the Mentally Damaged" | 3:43 |
| 9. | "Sensitive To the Light" | 4:20 |
| 10. | "Lesson in Violence" | 4:20 |
| 11. | "Sorry for the Shape I'm In" | 3:36 |
| 12. | "No Resistance" | 5:13 |
| 13. | "Bastards" (Single) | 4:30 |
| Total length: | | 46:08 |

== Personnel ==
- Jocke Berg - vocals
- Thomas Silver - guitar
- Martin Sandvik - bass, backing vocals
- Magnus "Adde" Andreasson - drums, percussion, backing vocals
