= Niclas Engelin =

Swedish guitarist

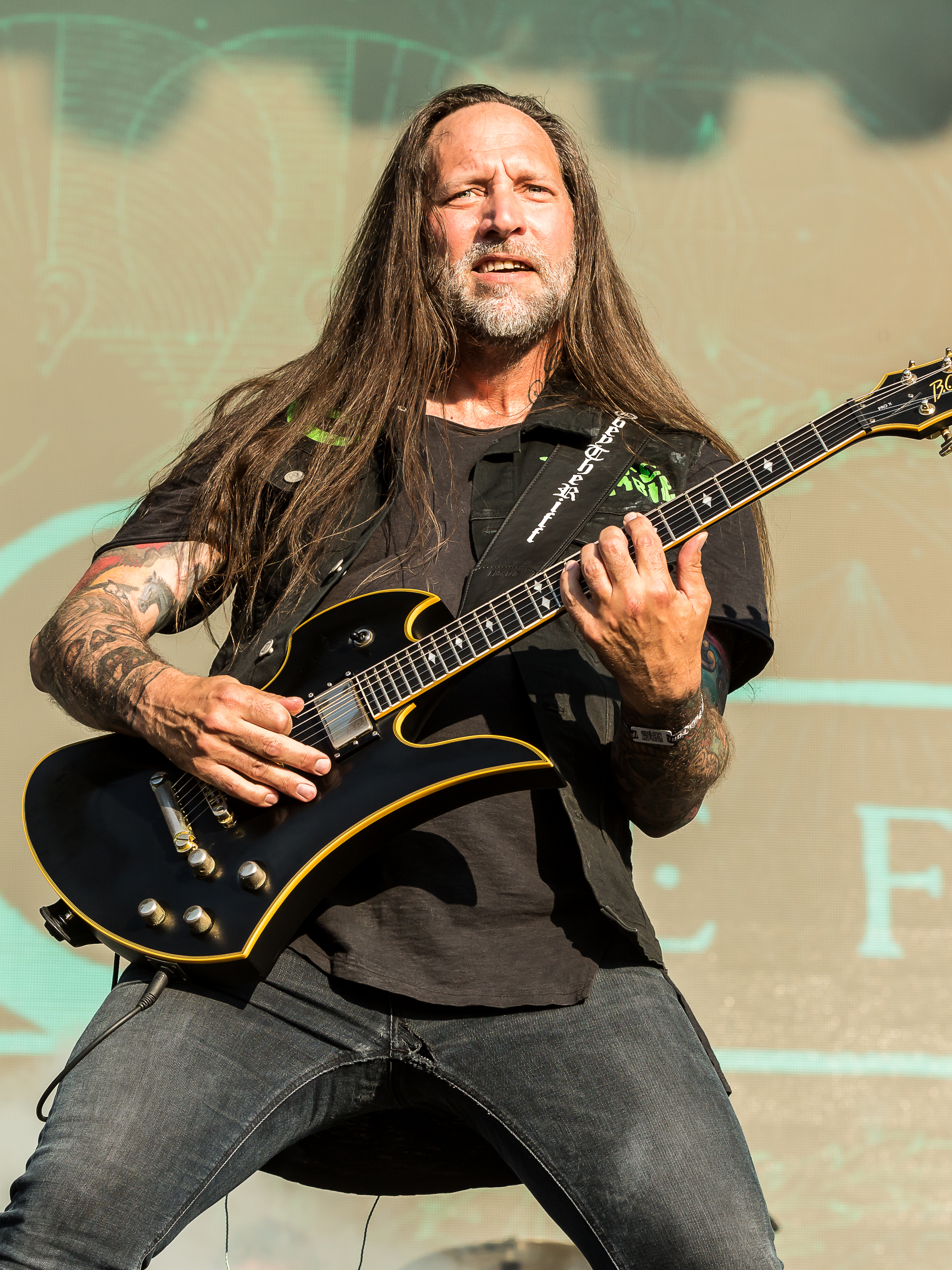
- Engelin with The Halo Effect in 2023

Background information
- Born: 27 December 1972 (age 52); Gothenburg, Sweden
- Genres: Melodic death metal; alternative metal; industrial metal
- Occupations: Musician; songwriter
- Instrument: Guitar
- Years active: 1990–present
- Member of: Engel; Drömriket; We Sell the Dead; The Halo Effect
- Formerly of: In Flames; Gardenian; Passenger; Sarcazm
- Website: engelnation.com inflames.com

Niclas Engelin (born 27 December 1972) is a Swedish guitarist, who is currently playing with Engel, Drömriket, We Sell the Dead, and The Halo Effect. He previously was the lead guitarist for Gardenian and Passenger and a guitarist for In Flames and has been in and out of In Flames on six occasions.

In 1997, Engelin replaced Glenn Ljungström of In Flames who had just quit. In 1998, Niclas quit In Flames and the band's drummer, Bjorn Gelotte, took over his position as guitarist. Engelin came back to fill in for Jesper Strömblad four times since back in 1998, when he quit. He rejoined In Flames briefly in late 2006 and again in 2009, as Jesper had been struggling with personal issues but maintained he would return. Niclas also toured with In Flames in North and South America, Australia, Europe, South Africa (RAMfest 2012) and portions of Japan in their Taste of Chaos tour.

On 12 February 2010, Jesper quit In Flames, citing a need to face ongoing personal issues. For that reason, Niclas returned as a guitarist, planning to stay until they could find a suitable replacement, but on 28 February 2011, the band decided that he would instead become the full-time guitarist himself.

He formed the band Engel in 2002 with guitarist Marcus Sunesson (The Crown).

In May 2011 Engelin became endorsed by B.C. Rich guitars, using the Warlock Pro X model with gold covered EMG 81 and 60 pickups. Mr Engelin is since 2012 endorsed by Gibson Guitar Corporation

Drömriket, a project started by Engelin and drummer Magnus "Adde" Andreasson (Hardcore Superstar), together with vocalist Ralf Gyllenhammar (Mustasch) and Jonas Slättung (bass and vocals), released their self-titled debut album in May 2014.

At the end of 2018 it was announced that Engelin would not perform the live shows at In Flames upcoming tour due to "health issues", with former Megadeth guitarist Chris Broderick as a replacement (initially only for a live). Since then, Engelin did not make any live and media performances with the band.

In October 2021, it was announced that Engelin would reunite with former In Flames bandmates Jesper, Peter Iwers, and Daniel Svensson, along with Dark Tranquility vocalist Mikael Stanne, in a new project named The Halo Effect.

After almost four years of Engelin's absence, later in November 2022, an interview with band's frontman Anders Friden revealed that Engelin had actually parted ways with In Flames. The guitarist himself has neither confirmed nor given any public announcement about his departure, with an exception of several statements between 2019 and 2021 that he is still in the band, but when he was asked the same question in 2022, Engelin refused to answer.

== Discography ==
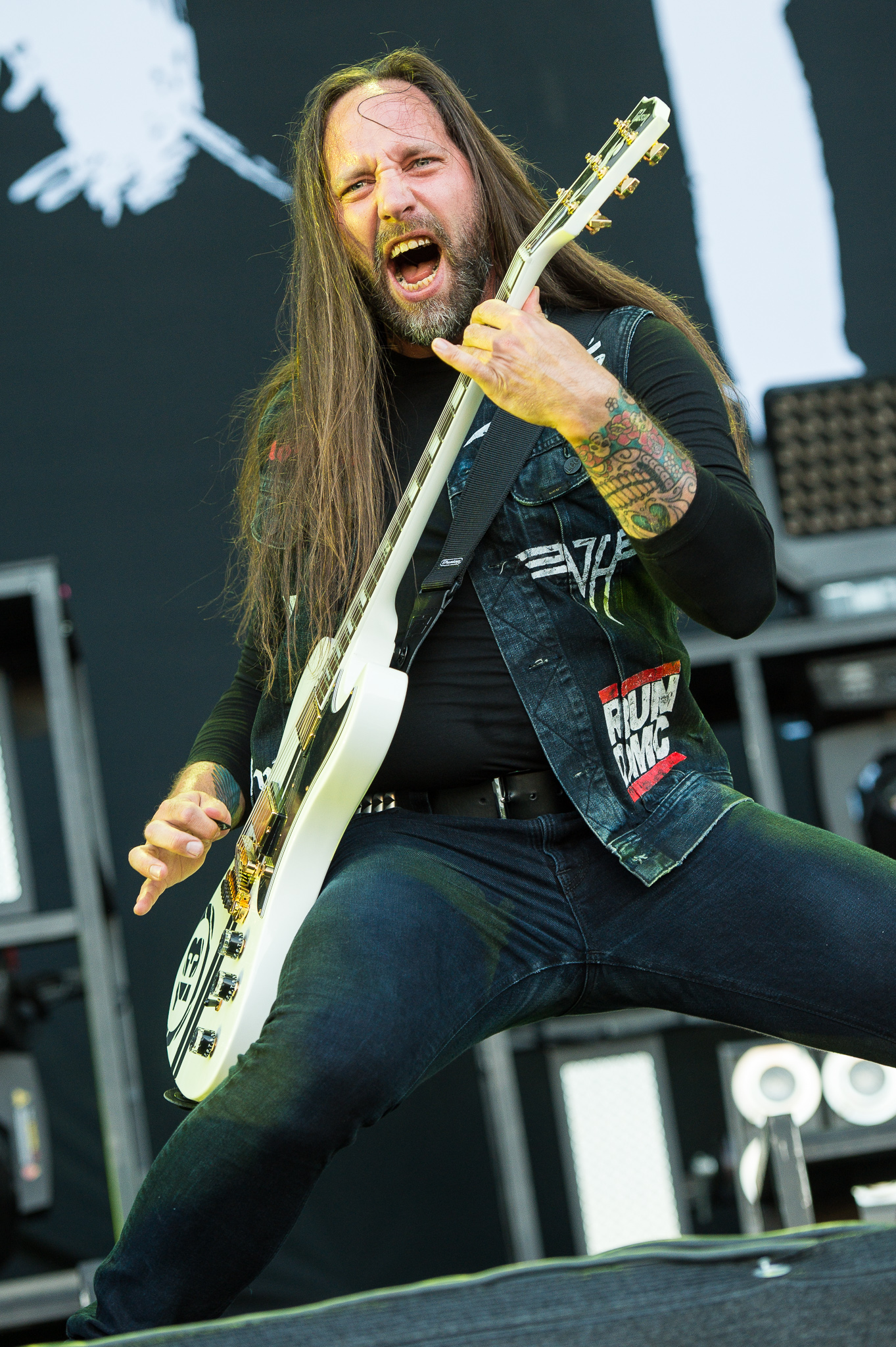
Engelin in 2015

=== With Sarcazm ===
- Breath, Shit, Excist... – 1993 (Deathside Records)

=== With Gardenian ===
- Two Feet Stand – 1997 (Listenable Records)
- Soulburner – 1999 (Nuclear Blast)
- Sindustries – 2000 (Nuclear Blast)

=== With Passenger ===
- In Reverse – 2003 Single (Century Media)
- Passenger – 2003 (Century Media)

=== With Engel ===
- Absolute Design – 2007 (SPV)
- Threnody – 2010 (Trooper Entertainment)
- Blood of Saints – 2012 (Season of Mist)
- Raven Kings – 2014 Gain/Sony

=== With In Flames ===
- Siren Charms – 2014 (Epic/Sony, Razzia)
- Battles – 2016 (Nuclear Blast)
- I, the Mask – 2019 (Nuclear Blast)

=== With Drömriket ===
- Drömriket – 2014 (Gain Records)

=== With The Halo Effect ===
- Days of The Lost – 2022 (Nuclear Blast)
- March of the Unheard – 2025 (Nuclear Blast)
