= Blood of Saints =

Studio album by Engel
- Released: 18 May 2012
- Recorded: 2011–2012; Antfarm Studios in Aabyhøj, Denmark
- Genre: Melodic death metal, industrial metal
- Length: 38:26
- Label: Season of Mist

Engel chronology
Threnody (2010)	Blood of Saints (2012)	Raven Kings (2014)

Blood of Saints is the third album from Swedish melodic death metal band Engel. This is the first Engel release to feature Jimmy Olausson on drums.

== Track listing ==
All tracks are written by Magnus "Mangan" Klavborn and Niclas Engelin, except where noted

No.	Title	Length
1.	"Question Your Place" (Klavborn, Engelin, Pontus Hjelm)	3:35
2.	"Frontline"	2:57
3.	"Feel Afraid"	3:06
4.	"Numb" (Klavborn, Engelin Marcus Sunesson, Jimmy Olausson)	2:54
5.	"Cash King"	4:39
6.	"One Good Thing" (Klavborn, Engelin, Hjelm)	3:20
7.	"Blood of Saints"	3:15
8.	"Down to Nothing"	3:29
9.	"Drama Queen" (Klavborn, Engelin, Hjelm)	3:16
10.	"In Darkness"	3:05
11.	"Journeys End"	4:50
12.	"Neon Knights" (Black Sabbath cover; Japanese bonus track)	3:21

== Personnel ==
- Magnus "Mangan" Klavborn – vocals
- Niclas Engelin – guitars
- Marcus Sunesson – guitars
- Steve Drennan – bass
- Jimmy Olausson – drums
