= No Regrets (Hardcore Superstar album) =

Studio album by Hardcore Superstar
- Released: 2003
- Genre: Sleaze rock, Glam rock
- Length: 41:07
- Label: Music for Nations

Hardcore Superstar chronology
Thank You (For Letting Us Be Ourselves) (2001)	No Regrets (2003)	Hardcore Superstar (2005)

No Regrets is the fourth full-length album by Swedish hard rock band Hardcore Superstar, released by the Music for Nations record label.

== Track listing ==
No.	Title	Length
1.	"Wall of Complaint"	2:23
2.	"No Regrets"	2:53
3.	"Breakout"	2:28
4.	"Soul of Sweetness"	3:16
5.	"Honey Tongue"	3:24
6.	"Still I'm Glad"	2:57
7.	"Bring Me Back"	3:06
8.	"Pathetic Way of Life"	2:26
9.	"It's So True"	2:53
10.	"Why Can't You Love Me Like Before"	3:15
11.	"The Last Great Day"	3:08
12.	"I Can't Change"	3:31
13.	"You Know Where We All Belong"	2:57

Japanese Bonus Track
No.	Title	Length
14.	"Who-Who"	2:37
