= Passenger (Passenger album) =

Studio album by Passenger
- Released: 28 April 2003
- Recorded: Studio Fredman, Gothenburg, Sweden
- Genre: Alternative metal, nu metal
- Length: 42:28
- Label: Century Media
- Producer: Passenger

Professional ratings
Review scores
Source	Rating
AllMusic	3/5 stars

Passenger is the only studio album by alternative metal band Passenger. It was released through Century Media Records in 2003.

== Track listing ==
1. "In Reverse" – 2:56
2. "In My Head" – 4:15
3. "For You" – 2:58
4. "Just the Same" – 3:13
5. "Carnival Diaries" – 3:55
6. "Circus" – 4:17
7. "Rain" – 3:14
8. "Circles" – 4:44
9. "I Die Slowly" – 3:36
10. "Used" – 3:52
11. "Eyes of My Mind" – 5:28
12. "Drowning City (demo)" (Japan bonus track)
13. "Clowns (demo)" (Japan bonus track)

== Personnel ==
Passenger

- Anders Fridén – vocals
- Niclas Engelin – guitar
- Patrik J. Sten – drums
- Håkan Skoger – bass

Additional personnel

- Pierre J. Sten – keyboards, programming, sampling
- Niklas Sundin – album art
