= Within Y =

Swedish melodic death metal band

- Origin: Gothenburg, Sweden
- Genres: Melodic death metal
- Years active: 2002–2012
- Label: Gain Music Entertainment
- Members: Mikael Nordin; Andreas Solveström; Niknam Moslehi; Jonas Larsson; Erik Hagström
- Past members: Matte Wänerstam; Thim Blom; Niklas Almén

Within Y (2002–2012) is a Swedish melodic death metal band from Gothenburg. They were previously signed to Gain Music Entertainment. The band split up in 2012.

== Band members ==
Current members

- Andreas Solveström – vocals (2002–present)
- Mikael Nordin – guitar (2002–present)
- Niknam Moslehi – guitar (2004–present)
- Jonas Larsson – bass guitar (2006–present)
- Erik Hagström – drums (2007–present)

Former members

- Niklas Almén – guitar (2002–2004)
- Matte Wänerstam – bass guitar (2002–2006)
- Thim Blom – drums (2002–2007)

== Discography ==
- Feeble and Weak (Demo) (2002)
- Extended Mental Dimensions (2004)
- Demo 05 (Demo) (2005)
- Portraying Dead Dreams (2006)
- The Cult (2008)
- Silence Conquers (2011)
