= Threnody (Engel album) =

Studio album by Engel
- Released: April 7, 2010
- Recorded: 2008; PUK Studios at Gjerlev, Denmark
- Genre: Melodic death metal, industrial metal
- Length: 53:00
- Label: Avex Group/Trooper Entertainment (Japan); Season of Mist (Europe/US)
- Producer: Tue Madsen

Engel chronology
Absolute Design (2007)	Threnody (2010)	Blood of Saints (2012)

Threnody is the second album from Swedish melodic death metal/industrial band Engel. This is the final Engel release with Daniel "Mojjo" Moilanen on drums. Threnody was finished by the end of 2008, but due to issues with their former label, SPV GmbH, the release of the album was delayed.

Music videos were released for the demo version of "Elbow And Knives" (entitled "Someone Died (Made You God)"), "Sense the Fire" and "Six Feet Deep".

== Track listing ==
Japanese track listing
No.	Title	Length
1.	"Threnody"	3:56
2.	"Sense the Fire"	4:20
3.	"Until Eternity Ends"	3:50
4.	"To the End"	4:01
5.	"Down"	3:49
6.	"Heartsick"	4:33
7.	"Feed the Weak"	4:15
8.	"For Those Who Will Resist"	3:41
9.	"Every Sin (Leaves a Mark)"	3:32
10.	"Roll the Dice"	4:37
11.	"Elbow and Knives"	3:10
12.	"Perfect Isis"	6:10
13.	"Fearless" (bonus track)	3:45
Total length:		53:38

Europe/US track listing
No.	Title	Length
1.	"Six Feet Deep"
2.	"Sense the Fire"
3.	"For Those Who Will Resist"
4.	"Feed the Weak"
5.	"To the End"
6.	"Every Sin (Leaves a Mark)"
7.	"Down"
8.	"Heartsick"
9.	"Threnody"
10.	"Burn"
11.	"Perfect Isis"

== Release history ==
Date	Region
April 7, 2010	Japan
November 8, 2010	Europe
January 11, 2011	United States

== Personnel ==
- Magnus "Mangan" Klavborn – vocals
- Niclas Engelin – guitars
- Marcus Sunesson – guitars
- Steve Drennan – bass
- Daniel "Mojjo" Moilanen – drums
