= Beg for It (album) =

Studio album by Hardcore Superstar
- Released: (Sweden) 3 June 2009 (United Kingdom) 8 June 2009
- Genre: Hard rock, heavy metal
- Length: 48:25
- Label: Nuclear Blast (SE); Abstract Sounds (UK)
- Producer: Adde, Johan Reiven, Risza, Martin Sandwin

Hardcore Superstar chronology
Dreamin' in a Casket (2007)	Beg for It (2009)	Split Your Lip (2010)

Professional ratings
Review scores
Source	Rating
Allmusic	3.5/5 stars
Dangerdog Music Reviews	(4.25/5)

Beg for It is the seventh studio album by Swedish hard rock band Hardcore Superstar. The album was released in Sweden on 3 June 2009, and in the United Kingdom on 8 June 2009. Hardcore Superstar released the album for streaming on their MySpace website on 27 May 2009. The first single to be released from the album was "Beg for It", which has already gained Gold status in Sweden.

== Track listing ==
Standard edition
No.	Title	Length
1.	"This Worm's for Ennio"	2:14
2.	"Beg for It"	3:56
3.	"Into Debauchery"	3:05
4.	"Shades of Grey"	3:25
5.	"Nervous Breakdown"	4:00
6.	"Hope for a Normal Life"	5:22
7.	"Don't Care 'Bout Your Bad Behavior"	4:34
8.	"Remove My Brain"	3:34
9.	"Spit It Out"	4:12
10.	"Illegal Fun"	4:00
11.	"Take 'Em All Out"	4:24
12.	"Innocent Boy"	5:36
Total length:		48:25

USA Bonus Tracks
No.	Title	Length
13.	"When I Glow"	5:08
14.	"Welcome to Your Own Death"	3:52
Total length:		56:19

== Personnel ==
- Jocke Berg - lead vocals
- Vic Zino - guitar
- Martin Sandvik - bass, vocals
- Magnus "Adde" Andreason - drums
