= It's Only Rock 'n' Roll (Hardcore Superstar album) =

Studio album by Hardcore Superstar
- Released: October 1998
- Genre: Sleaze rock, hard rock
- Length: 37:33
- Label: Gain Records
- Producer: Hardcore Superstar

Hardcore Superstar chronology
It's Only Rock 'n' Roll (1998)	Bad Sneakers and a Piña Colada (2000)

It's Only Rock 'n' Roll is the first full-length album by Swedish hard rock band Hardcore Superstar. It was released only in Sweden. Many songs were re-recorded in the following album, Bad Sneakers and a Piña Colada.

== Track listing ==
1. "Hello/Goodbye" - 2:49
2. "Baby Come Along" - 3:06
3. "Send Myself To Hell" - 2:17
4. "Bubblecum Ride" - 2:43
5. "Rock 'N' Roll Star" - 3:35
6. "Someone Special" - 5:26
7. "Dig A Hole" - 2:39
8. "Punk Rock Song" - 3:21
9. "Right Here, Right Now" - 4:03
10. "So Deep Inside" 3:21
11. "Fly Away" 4:13
