= Engel (band) =

Swedish metal band

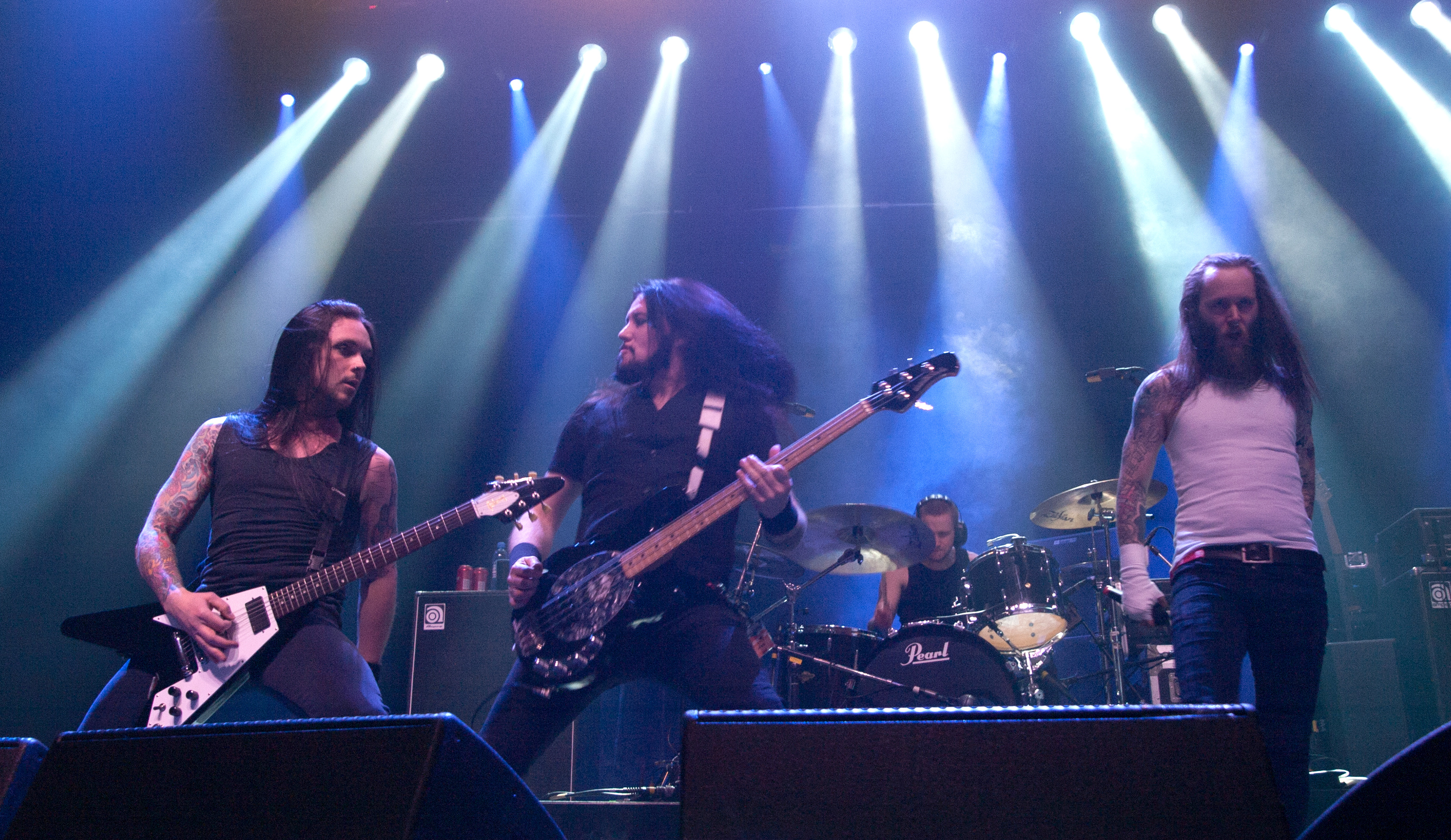
- Engel performing in 2012

Background information
- Origin: Gothenburg, Sweden
- Genres: Melodic death metal; industrial metal
- Years active: 2005–present
- Labels: Gain/Sony, Season of Mist, Trooper/Avex, Frostbyte
- Members: Niclas Engelin; Marcus Sunesson; Steve Drennan; Oscar Nilsson; Mikael Sehlin
- Website: engelpropaganda.com

Engel is a Swedish melodic death metal band from Gothenburg. They are currently signed to Gain Records/Sony.

== History ==
Engel released their debut album Absolute Design through SPV/Steamhammer on 31 October 2007. The album was released in North America on 20 May 2008.

Their second album, Threnody, was finished by the end of 2008, but due to issues with their former label, SPV, the release was delayed. On 7 April 2010, Threnody was released in Japan through Trooper Entertainment. The album was released on the music streaming service Spotify on 8 November 2010 and in Europe on the same date through Season of Mist. Threnody was released in North America on 11 January 2011, also through Season of Mist.

The band's third album, Blood of Saints, was released in Japan on 15 April 2012 through Trooper Entertainment. It was later released in Europe on 18 May 2012 and in the United States through Frostbyte on 25 September 2012.

On 18 April 2006, Robert Hakemo was replaced by Johan Andreassen. On 5 August 2006, Michael Håkansson became the new bass player. On 14 August 2008, Håkansson left the band to pursue other opportunities. Steve Drennan (Amon Amarth) took over playing bass during November 2008. During 2010, the band replaced their drummer Daniel "Mojjo" Moilanen with Jimmy Olausson, who also plays drums for Marionette. In June 2014, Olausson quit the band and was replaced with Oscar Nilsson.

Engel recorded its fourth album in Creahate Studios in mid-2014, which was released on 26 November 2014 through Gain Music/Sony in Europe and on 27 January 2015 in the US and Canada. A video for the opening track "Salvation" was also released at the same time.

The band has shared the stage with Still Remains and toured Europe with Amon Amarth and Dimmu Borgir. They were also part of Paradise Lost's "Faith Divides Us – Death Unites Us" tour along with Katatonia and Samael.

== Band members ==
=== Current ===
- Niclas Engelin – guitar (2005–present)
- Marcus Sunesson – guitar (2005–present)
- Steve Drennan – bass (2008–present)
- Mikael Sehlin – vocals (2012–present)
- Oscar Nilsson – drums (2014–present)

=== Former ===
Vocalist

- Mangan (Magnus Klavborn) – 2005–2012

Drummers

- Mojjo (Daniel Moilanen) – 2005–2010
- Jimmy Olausson – 2010–2014

Bassists

- Robert Hakemo – 2005–2006
- Johan Andreassen – 2006
- Michael Håkansson – 2006–2008

== Discography ==
Title	Release date	Label
Engel	2005	Independent
Absolute Design	2007	SPV/Steamhammer
Threnody	2010	Trooper Entertainment (Japan)
Blood of Saints	2012	Seasons of Mist
Raven Kings	2014	Gain/Sony
Abandon All Hope	2018	Gain/Sony
