= Martin Westerstrand =

Swedish musician (born 1973)

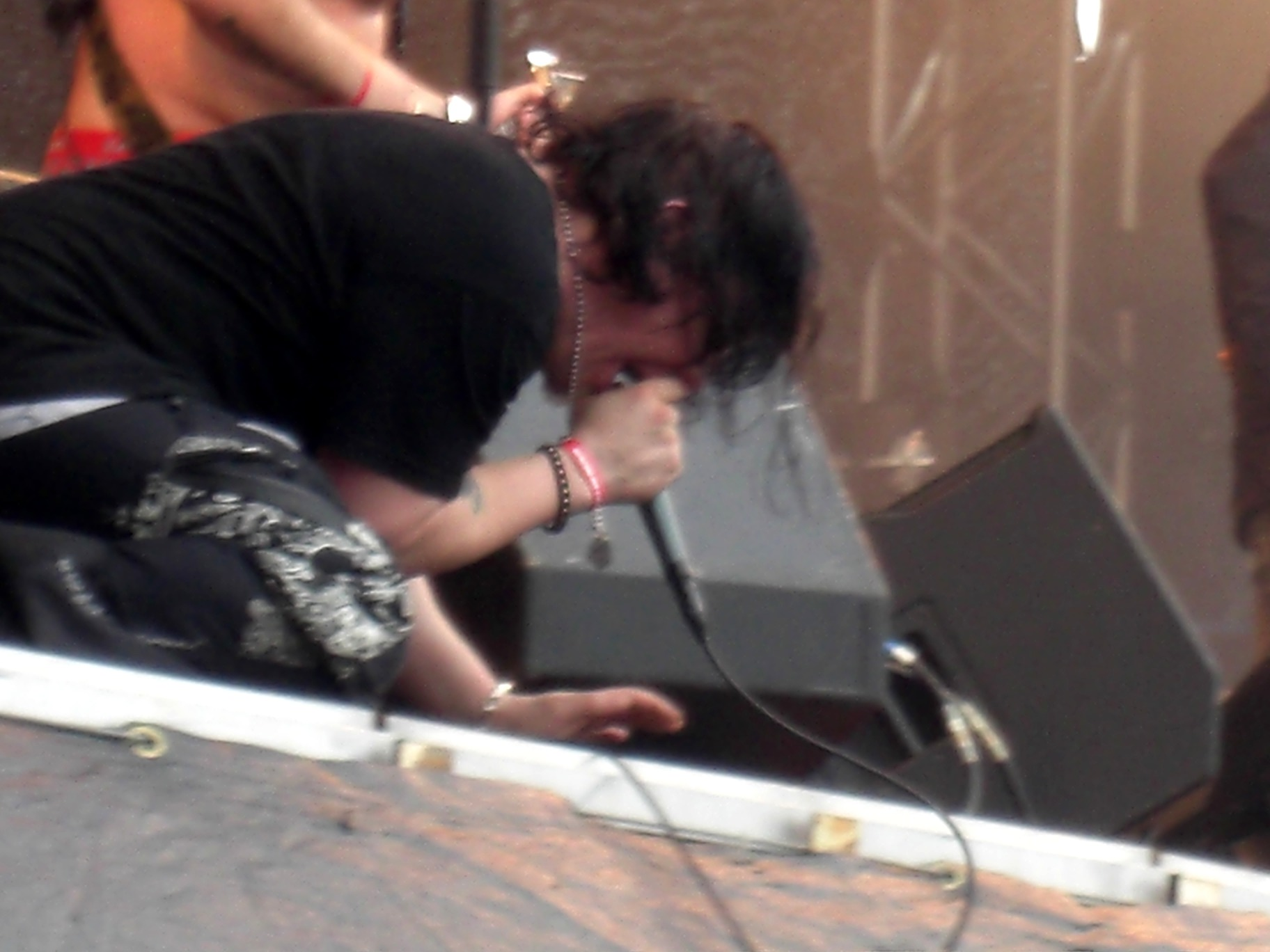
- Martin Westerstrand performing with Lillasyster at the Metaltown Festival 2008

Background information
- Born: Martin Skans Westerstrand; 6 December 1973 (age 52); Gothenburg, Sweden
- Occupation: musician
- Instrument: vocals
- Member of: Lillasyster
- Formerly of: LOK

Martin Skans Westerstrand (born 6 December 1973) is a Swedish musician from Gothenburg. In 1995 he founded hard rock band LOK. He was the lead singer until the band was dissolved in 2002. After that, he and LOK-bassist Daniel Cordero started the band Rallypack together with guitarist Max Flövik and drummer Ian-Paolo Lira. In 2006 they changed the band name to Lillasyster (Little Sister), and released their first album in 2007.
