= Hardcore Superstar =

Swedish rock band

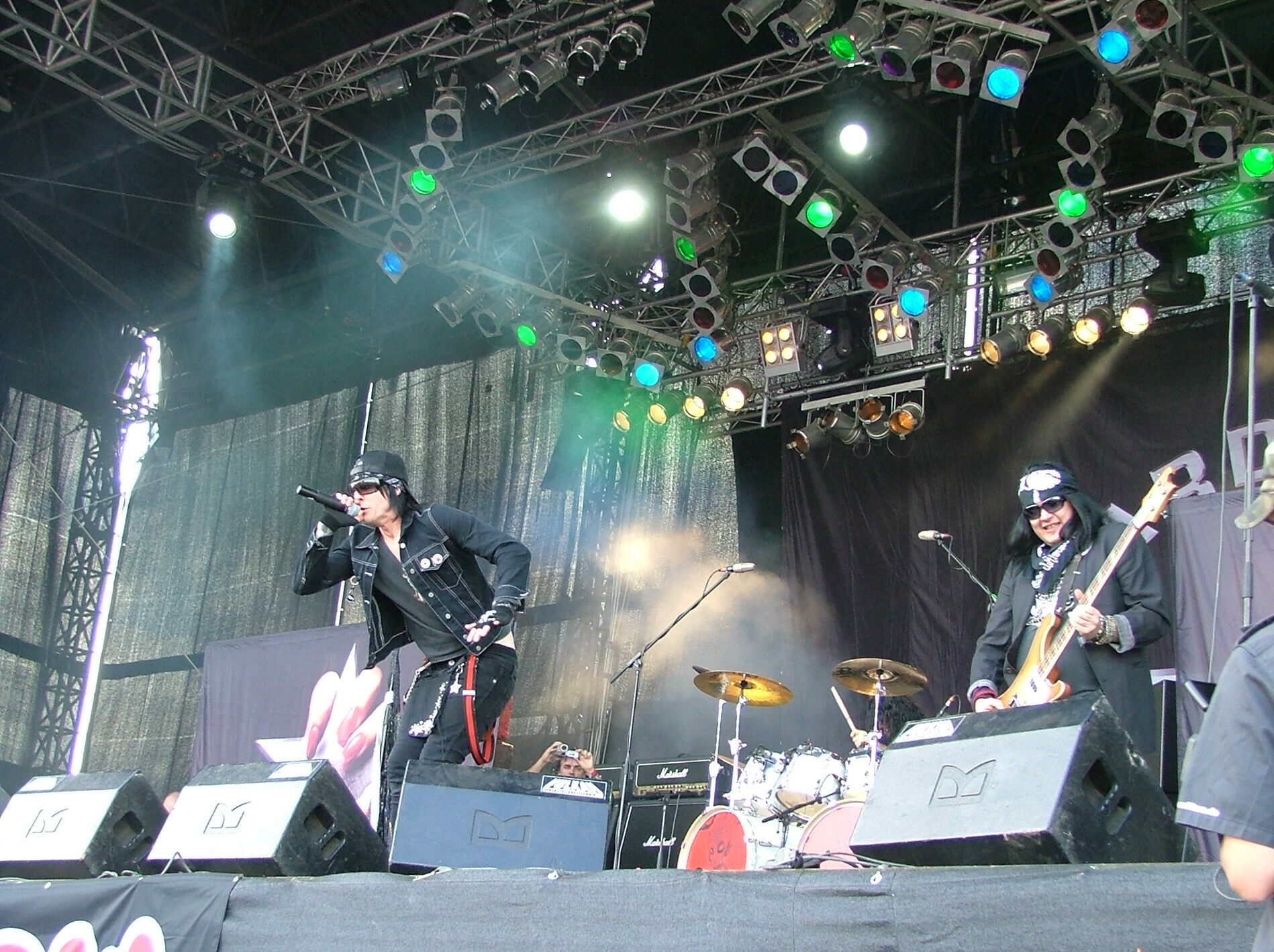
- Hardcore Superstar at Summerbreeze 2007

Background information
- Origin: Gothenburg, Sweden
- Genres: Hard rock; glam metal; sleaze rock
- Years active: 1997–present
- Labels: Gain, Music for Nations, Nuclear Blast
- Members: Jocke Berg; Martin Sandvik; Vic Zino; Efraim Larsson
- Past members: Magnus "Adde" Andreasson; Thomas "Silver" Silver; Mika "Dyna Mike" Vaino
- Website: hardcoresuperstar.com

Hardcore Superstar is a Swedish rock band from Gothenburg, formed in 1997. They have released eleven studio albums.

== History ==
=== The first ten years (1997–2007) ===
==== 1997–2004 ====
Hardcore Superstar was formed in Gothenburg, Sweden in 1997 by Joakim Berggren and Martin Sandvik. Their previous band Link had been grunge-inspired but with their new band they wanted to pull more towards rock 'n' roll. They kept the drummer from Link, Mika Vaino (with the moniker DynaMike), and as lead guitarist they recruited Thomas Silver who had previously been in the band Glamoury Foxx with Jocke and had recently quit the band Green Jesus Saviours. During an early gig, Silver introduced Jocke as "Gothenburg's very own Jocke Berg", a reference to the singer of the Swedish band Kent and the moniker Stuck. Through Silver's contacts with the Gothenburg record label Gain Records they got their song "Hello/Goodbye" included on a promo compilation titled Gain Experience, which led to a record deal with the label. In early 1998, they recorded their debut album, released in Sweden on 4 October. The first pressing of 1000 copies sold very fast, and so did the second pressing. "Hello/Goodbye" was put out as the single and music video.

The band got to support Backyard Babies, Motörhead and Dio, and soon the British company Music For Nations offered the band a new worldwide record deal. By the end of 1998, drummer DynaMike decided to quit. Jocke phoned Magnus "Adde" Andreasson, who at that time was living in Los Angeles where he had been a student at Musicians Institute. Adde, who had formerly been the original drummer of Link and his own band Dorian Gray, accepted the offer and moved home to Gothenburg.

During 1999 the band's second single "Someone Special" became a hit song in Sweden and ended up on the Top 20 of national radio music charts. Instead of re-releasing their debut album with Music for Nations, as the label wanted, the band insisted on recording a new version since they wanted Adde to play on the album and they had already written new songs such as "Liberation" and "Have You Been Around". Bad Sneakers and a Piña Colada became their international debut album, released in the spring of 2000. The music video for "Liberation" was nominated for a Swedish Grammy Award. The entire year was spent on tour in Sweden, Europe and Japan. The tour continued into 2001 when it also took them to Canada for a few shows.

In the winter of 2001 they released the single "Staden Göteborg" together with fellow Gothenburg band LOK. The song is an anthem to their hometown, and in February 2001 the two bands performed a joint set in Gothenburg where all members played together. On Midsummer's Eve they repeated this concept when both bands were the joint support act for AC/DC at Ullevi Stadium in Gothenburg. A few days later, Hardcore Superstar were invited to support AC/DC a second time in Turin, where they replaced Megadeth.

In September 2001, the band released their third album, Thank You (For Letting Us Be Ourselves). The album had a more laid back and polished feel than its action rock predecessors, and spawned two singles; "Shame" and "Mother's Love" / "Significant Other".

In the spring of 2003, they recorded their next album and during their summer tour they released the single "Honey Tongue". The album No Regrets was released on 27 August, once again with a different style from the predecessor. A second single, "Still I'm Glad", followed. For this album the Japanese version featured a completely different cover. After touring Sweden and Europe in the autumn and winter they made their first short tour of the US in March 2004, funded by the Swedish Export's Council. The day before their show at CBGB in New York they attended a cocktail party at the Swedish Consulate, where members of the band got into a fist fight with a Swedish tabloid journalist.

When the band returned from the US they decided to take a break, after several years of hard work.

==== 2005–2007 ====
In the spring of 2005 the band made their first signs of a comeback with a few concerts in Italy. They had returned to their former record label Gain and in the summer they released their new single "Wild Boys", which became the most sold heavy metal single in Sweden that summer. By the end of August they did their Swedish comeback gig in Gothenburg, and in October they once again supported Motörhead in Sweden. A second single, "We Don't Celebrate Sundays", was released and on 2 November they released the self-titled album Hardcore Superstar. This return had a rejuvenated and heavier sound. The album was granted top reviews in several major Swedish newspapers and was nominated for a Swedish Grammy. The songs My Good Reputation and Bag On Your Head were also picked as singles. A show at the Sticky Fingers club in Gothenburg on 25 March 2006 was filmed for a DVD. A festival show in Tokyo during the summer was also released on DVD

With this triumphant return, the band branded their new style as 'street metal'.

The summer of 2007 saw the release of the new single "Bastards" which sold gold in Sweden and went to number 4 on the Swedish singles chart. During their summer tour they played the biggest stage at Sweden Rock Festival, a show that would later be released on DVD.

On 7 November they released the album Dreamin' in a Casket, recorded both at Adde's home studio and in the studio of fellow Gothenburg band In Flames. This album had an even heavier sound than its predecessor. Once again there were top reviews and another Swedish Grammy nomination. The album was also released with a bonus DVD, featuring the documentary "Inside the Casket" about the recordings. The title track and the songs "Silence for the Peacefully" and "Medicate Me" were picked as singles. The following tour was called "Mentally Damaged Tour" and started in Helsinki on 12 November and continued through Europe.

=== 2008–2018 ===
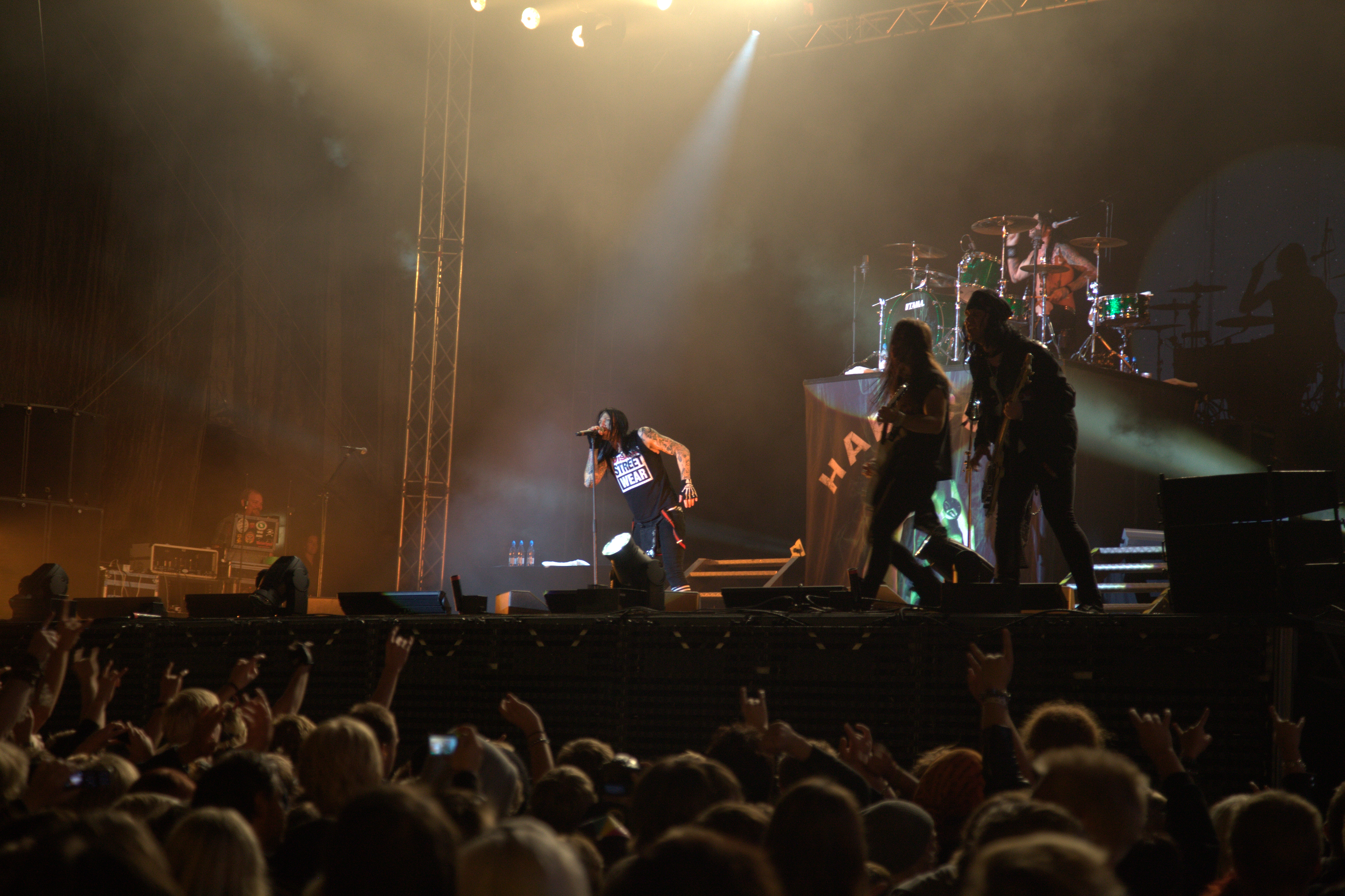
Hardcore Superstar performing in Gothenburg in 2010

On 24 January 2008, it was announced on the band's official website that guitarist Thomas Silver would be leaving the band, since he had "lost his fire and inspiration". Vic Zino, from their current opening act Crazy Lixx, replaced him temporarily for the remainder of the planned tour and when Zino later offered to stay he became the new permanent member of the band.

In March 2009 the world's biggest heavy metal label Nuclear Blast announced the signing of Hardcore Superstar. The seventh album by Hardcore Superstar, entitled Beg for It was released worldwide at the beginning of June 2009. It was once again recorded in the In Flames studio. The first single "Beg For It" was released on 15 April and the song "Into Debauchery" would later get a music video. The album gave the band their third Swedish Grammy nomination in a row. The Japanese edition featured a live version of "Silence for the Peacefully" as the bonus track, while the American version contained two demo songs, one being "Welcome to Your Own Death", and the other "When I Glow", a demo version of "Need No Company", again, from the album Dreamin' in a Casket.

Shortly after the Beg For It tour of the UK in 2010, Hardcore Superstar announced that they were planning to release a new album, as the tour had proved to trigger their creative minds, and as a result, new material was being recorded. On 12 April 2010 they announced four potential song titles from their upcoming album, being "Last Call", "Sick as a Dog", "Won't Be Bullied" and "Sadistic Girls". On 19 May 2010, the band released the titles of four more potential songs from their upcoming album, being "Lowlife", "Beat On the Bully", "Party Ain't Over ´til I Say So" and "Here Comes That Sick Bitch Again". "Last Call", and presumably, judging by the chorus of the song, "Party Ain't Over 'til I Say So", were changed to "Last Call for Alcohol", "Won't Be Bullied", and again, presumably, "Beat on the Bully", were changed to "Bully", while "Sick as a Dog" and "Lowlife" were left off the release. On 9 August 2010, Split Your Lip was announced as the title of the album, as well as a tentative release date, set for January 2011. When the band performed a free show in their hometown Gothenburg on 11 August 2010, they premiered the songs "Here Comes That Sick Bitch", "Last Call for Alcohol" and "Sadistic Girls". The first single, a double A-side featuring both "Moonshine" and "Guestlist" was released with the November issue of Sweden Rock Magazine and was followed by the album release on 26 November, two months earlier than planned. The album had been thoroughly rehearsed and then recorded live in only five days at Studio Bohus south of Gothenburg. The album was followed by intense touring.

On 30 August 2011 the band announced that they would be releasing a Best Of album, with a release date of 26 October. The album was to include songs from all releases, with a brand new song entitled "We Don't Need a Cure". The song premiered on Swedish radio station Bandit Rock on 31 August 2011.

On 30 October 2012, it was announced by Gain and Vic Zino that the next album would be called C'mon Take on Me. The debut single from the album, "One More Minute", was released on 17 January 2013. The album was released on 27 February 2013. It was recorded at Brew House Studio in central Gothenburg. Four music videos were made to the album, for the songs "One More Minute", "Above the Law", "Because of You" and "C'Mon Take On Me".

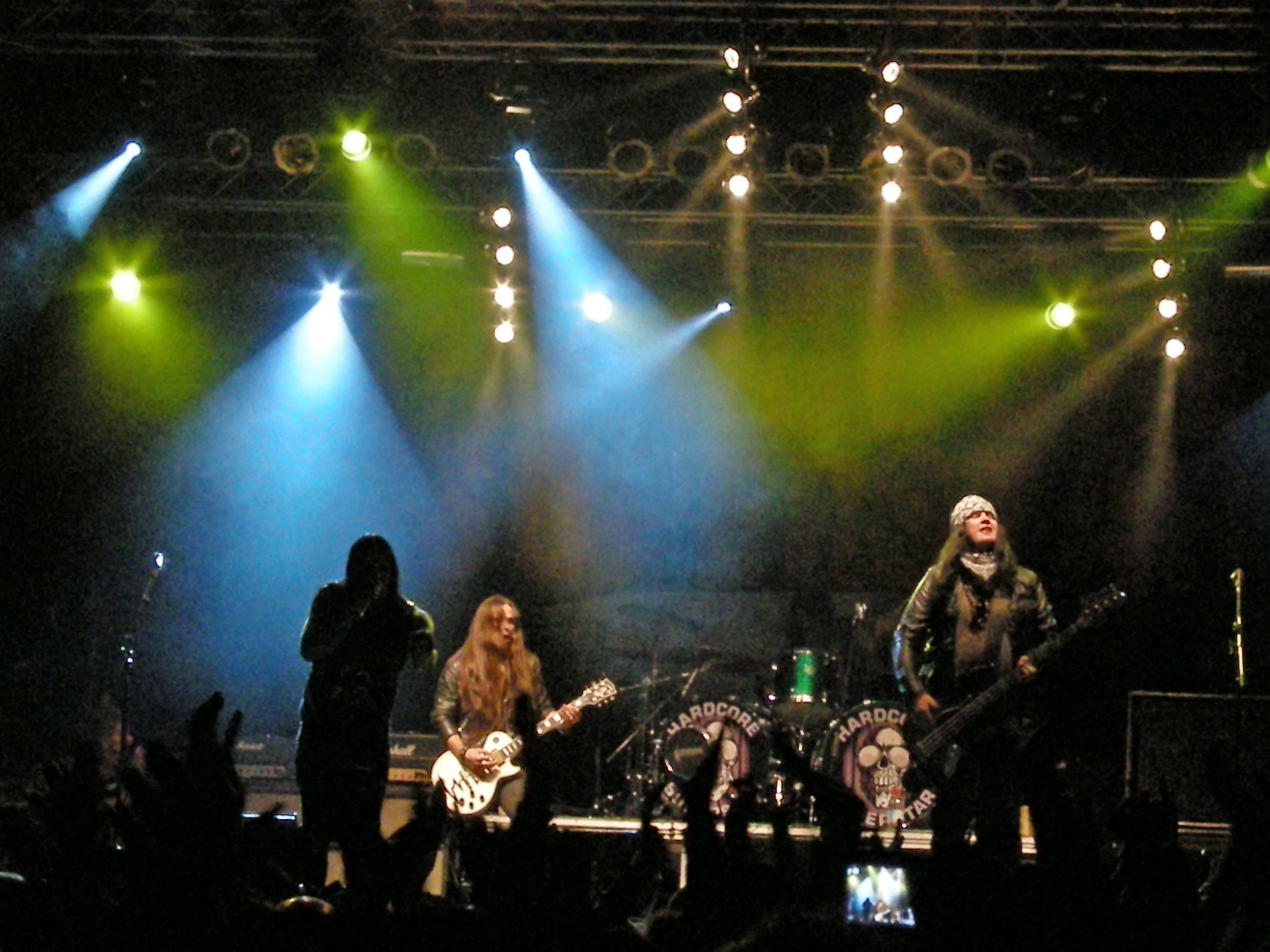
Hardcore Superstar at Skogsröjet 2012 in Sweden

October 2014 saw the release of a new single, Glue, and the band toured Germany as the opening act for Gotthard. On 24 January 2015 the band performed a full headline set to a sold-out crowd at the Whisky a Go Go in West Hollywood, California, after more than ten years since their latest American show. The night before they also played a six-song opening set for Steel Panther at the 2015 NAMM Jam in Anaheim, California. At the beginning of March 2015 a second single was released from the upcoming album, Touch the Sky, and during the spring tour they premiered several new songs live. The album, titled HCSS was released on 22 April. A large inspiration for the album came when a fan in England managed to dig out old demos from 1994 with the band's predecessor Link, and some of the songs were 20 years old. In 2016, the band embarked on a co-headlining UK and US tour with Michael Monroe.

On 12 October 2017, the band released the single "Have Mercy on Me" for their next album, and it was followed by four more singles ("Bring the House Down", "Electric Rider", "Baboon" and "AD/HD") before the album, You Can't Kill My Rock 'n' Roll, was released on 21 September 2018. All four singles were granted a music video, as well as the title track. The album was nominated for yet another Swedish Grammy award.

=== 2021–2025 ===
During a live stream of the Alive and Streaming podcast, with Ted Aguilar from Death Angel, Jocke announced that the album, which the band had been working on during the pandemic, would be released in 2022, and would be titled Abrakadabra.

The first single from the album, "Catch Me If You Can", was released on 28 August 2021, followed by "Dreams in Red" on 1 October 2021. The third single, "Weep When You Die", was released on 5 November 2021. In January and February 2022 a fourth and fifth single came out, "Forever and a Day" and "Fighter", and on the eve before the album release in March the title track was premiered as a video. The album was released on 25 March 2022.

Adde decided to take a longer break from touring during 2023. Johan Reivén, who produced Abrakadabra and Hardcore Superstar, joined as a temporary live drummer for 2023. On 6 February 2024 Adde and the band announced that Adde had chosen to leave Hardcore Superstar after 25 years. Johan Reivén was to return as a temporary live drummer.

In 2025 the band was featured on the sound track for the 2nd season of the HBO series Peacemaker (TV series)

== Band members ==
- Joakim "Jocke" Berg – vocals (1997–present)
- Martin Sandvik – bass (1997–present)
- Vic Zino – guitars (2008–present)
- Efraim Larsson – drums (2025 – present)

Former members

- Thomas "Silver" Silver – guitars (1997–2008)
- Mika "DynaMike" Vainio – drums (1997–1999)
- Magnus "Adde" Andreasson – drums (1999–2024)

Touring members

- Johan Reiven - drums (2023-2025)

== Discography ==
=== Albums ===
- It's Only Rock 'n' Roll – (1998)
- Bad Sneakers and a Piña Colada – (2000)
- Thank You (For Letting Us Be Ourselves) – (2001)
- No Regrets – (2003)
- Hardcore Superstar – (2005)
- Dreamin' in a Casket – (2007)
- Beg for It – (2009)
- Split Your Lip (2010)
- C'mon Take on Me (2013)
- HCSS (2015)
- You Can't Kill My Rock 'n' Roll (2018)
- Abrakadabra (2022)

=== Compilation albums ===
- The Party Ain't Over 'til We Say So (2011)

=== Singles ===
- "Hello/Goodbye" (1998)
- "Someone Special" (1998)
- "Have You Been Around" (2000)
- "Liberation" (2000)
- "Shame" (2001)
- "Staden Göteborg" (2001)
- "Mother's Love" / "Significant Other" (2002)
- "Honey Tongue" (2003)
- "Still I'm Glad" (2003)
- "Wild Boys" (2005)
- "We Don't Celebrate Sundays" (2006)
- "Bastards" (2007) (Gold)
- "Beg for It" (2009) (Gold)
- "Moonshine" / "Guestlist" (2010)
- "One More Minute" (2012)
- "Above the Law" (2013)
- "Because of You" (2013)
- "Glue" (2014)
- "Touch the Sky" (2015)
- "Have Mercy on Me" (2017)
- "Bring the House Down" (2018)
- "Electric Rider" (2018)
- "Baboon" (2018)
- "AD/HD" (2018)
- "You Can't Kill My Rock 'n' Roll" (2018)
- "Catch Me If You Can" (2021)
- "Dreams in Red" (2021)
- "Weep When You Die (2021)
- "Forever and a Day" (2022)
- "Fighter (2022)
- "Abrakadabra" (2022)

=== DVDs ===
- Live at Sticky Fingers (2006)
- Sweden Rock 2007 (2007) (Limited Fan Edition)
- Loud Park Festival: Tokyo (2007) (Limited Fan Edition)
- Inside the Casket: Documentary (2007) (Released through the Dreamin' in a Casket CD/DVD album)

=== Music videos ===
- "Hello/Goodbye" (1998)
- "Liberation" (2000)
- "Have You Been Around" (2000)
- "Someone Special" (2000)
- "Shame" (2001)
- "Significant Other" (2001)
- "Mothers Love" (2001)
- "Staden Goteborg" (with LOK) (2002)
- "Honey Tongue" (2003)
- "Still I'm Glad" (2003)
- "Wild Boys" (2005)
- "We Don't Celebrate Sundays" (2005)
- "My Good Reputation" (2006)
- "Dreamin' in a Casket" (2007)
- "Medicate Me" (2007)
- "Silence for the Peacefully" (2007)
- "Beg for It" (2009)
- "Into Debauchery" (2009)
- "One More Minute" (2013)
- "Above the Law" (2013)
- "C'mon Take on Me" (2013)
- "Because of You" (2013)
- "Last Call for Alcohol" (live video) (2014)
- "Off with Their Heads" (2015)
- "Don't Mean Shit" (2015)
- "Touch the Sky" (live video) (2015)
- "Have Mercy on Me" (2017)
- "Electric Rider" (2018)
- "Baboon" (2018)
- "Bring the House Down" (2018)
- "AD/HD" (2018)
- "You Can't Kill My Rock 'n' Roll" (2018)
- "Catch Me If You Can" (2021)
- "Dreams in Red" (2021)
- "Weep When You Die (2021)
- "Forever and a Day" (2022)
- "Fighter" (2022)
- "Abrakadraba" (2022)
