= Live in the Heart of Helsinki =

Live album by Soilwork
- Released: February 20, 2015
- Recorded: 21 March 2014
- Venue: The Circus, Helsinki, Finland
- Genre: Melodic death metal, alternative metal
- Length: 101:44 (concert only)
- Label: Nuclear Blast
- Producer: Jouni Markkanen

Soilwork chronology
Beyond the Infinite (2014)	Live in the Heart of Helsinki (2015)	The Ride Majestic (2015)

Live in the Heart of Helsinki is the first live album and video by Swedish melodic death metal band Soilwork. It was recorded live on 21 March 2014 at the Circus in Helsinki, Finland. The DVD was produced by Jouni Markkanen, directed by Ville Lipiäinen and mixed by Kimmo Ahola. It was released in 2CD+DVD and 2CD+BD formats.

== Background ==
Band frontman Björn "Speed" Strid commented on the release saying: "There could've not been a better time than now, with 10 albums out and a very varied back catalogue to choose from. Our line up now is 50 % original members and 50 % fresh blood, which makes it all more interesting. Especially since the newest members have brought so much to our sound and have continued to inspire us to write new and exciting music and also brought a new found energy on stage. Now is definitely the time to see us. Trust me."

Bonus features on the DVD/BD include two documentaries ("Spectrum of Eternity: A Brief History of Soilwork" and "Behind the Scenes of the Living Infinite") and four drumcam videos.

== Track listing ==
CD 1
No.	Title	Length
1.	"This Momentary Bliss"	3:56
2.	"Like the Average Stalker"	4:30
3.	"Overload"	4:05
4.	"Weapon of Vanity"	4:11
5.	"Spectrum of Eternity"	4:02
6.	"Follow the Hollow"	4:09
7.	"Parasite Blues"	4:42
8.	"Distortion Sleep"	4:07
9.	"Bastard Chain"	4:07
10.	"Let This River Flow"	5:11
11.	"Long Live the Misanthrope"	5:35
12.	"Tongue"	4:23
Total length:		52:58

CD 2
No.	Title	Length
1.	"Nerve"	4:37
2.	"The Chainheart Machine"	3:53
3.	"The Living Infinite"	3:50
4.	"Rise Above the Sentiment"	4:26
5.	"Late for the Kill, Early for the Slaughter"	4:52
6.	"Rejection Role"	3:36
7.	"Black Star Deceiver"	5:13
8.	"As the Sleeper Awakes"	4:17
9.	"Sadistic Lullabye"	3:17
10.	"As We Speak"	4:13
11.	"Stabbing the Drama"	6:32
Total length:		48:46

== Personnel ==
- Björn Strid – vocals
- David Andersson – guitar
- Sylvain Coudret – guitar
- Sven Karlsson – keyboards
- Ola Flink – bass, backing vocals
- Dirk Verbeuren – drums
