= Six (Dream Evil album) =

Studio album by Dream Evil
- Released: 26 May 2017
- Recorded: 2016–2017
- Genre: Power metal, heavy metal
- Length: 51:15
- Label: Century Media
- Producer: Fredrik Nordström

Dream Evil chronology
In the Night (2010)	Six (2017)	Metal Gods (2024)

Professional ratings
Review scores
Source	Rating
Metal.de	5/10
Powermetal.de	7/10
Rock Hard	7/10

Six is the sixth full-length album by Swedish heavy metal band Dream Evil. The album was released on 26 May 2017, through Century Media Records, seven years after their 2010 release, In the Night. This is the second album by Dream Evil with guitarist Mark Black (AKA Markus Fristedt), who performed in their 2006 release, United. It is also their last album with drummer Patrik Jerksten.

== Track listing ==
No.	Title	Length
1.	"Dream Evil"	5:19
2.	"Antidote"	3:24
3.	"Sin City"	4:55
4.	"Creature of the Night"	4:44
5.	"Hellride"	3:40
6.	"Six Hundred and 66"	3:40
7.	"How to Start a War"	4:18
8.	"The Murdered Mind"	3:13
9.	"Too Loud"	3:45
10.	"44 Riders"	4:57
11.	"Broken Wings"	4:09
12.	"We Are Forever"	5:11
Total length:		51:15

Limited edition bonus tracks
No.	Title	Length
13.	"Under Attack"	4:45
14.	"Nowhere to Run"	3:49

Japanese edition bonus tracks (includes limited edition bonus tracks)
No.	Title	Length
15.	"Conquer the Power"	4:26
16.	"Crush It"	3:50

== Credits ==
- Niklas Isfeldt - Vocals
- Fredrik Nordström - Guitars
- Mark Black - Guitars
- Peter Stålfors - Bass
- Patrik Jerksten - Drums
