= The First Chapter (EP) =

Single album by Dream Evil
- Released: 26 April 2004
- Genre: Heavy metal Power metal
- Length: 11:31
- Label: Century Media
- Producer: Fredrik Nordström and Dream Evil

The First Chapter is a single/EP released by the power metal band Dream Evil.

== Track listing ==
No.	Title	Length
1.	"The Book of Heavy Metal" (Edit)	3:48
2.	"Tired"	3:49
3.	"Point of No Return"	3:51

== Credits ==
- Niklas Isfeldt - Vocals
- Fredrik Nordström - Guitars, Keyboards
- Gus G. - Guitars
- Peter Stålfors - Bass
- Snowy Shaw - Drums
