= Live Equation =

Live album by Pagan's Mind
- Released: 14 September 2009
- Recorded: 2008–2009
- Venue: Rockefeller Music Hall, Oslo, Norway; ProgPower USA; Ibsenhuset, Skien, Norway
- Genre: Progressive metal, power metal
- Length: 3:58:00
- Label: PM Records

Pagan's Mind chronology
God's Equation (2007)	Live Equation (2009)	Heavenly Ecstasy (2011)

Professional ratings
Review scores
Source	Rating
Metal Express Radio	8/10
Metal.de	7/10
Exact	5/6

Live Equation is a live album by the Norwegian progressive metal band Pagan's Mind. It was released on 14 September 2009. The CD and first DVD documents the band's show at Rockefeller Music Hall in Oslo on 1 November 2008, while the second DVD includes live tracks recorded in other shows and rehearsals, as well as a documentary of the band's tour.

== Track listing ==
CD and DVD disc 1
No.	Title	Length
1.	"The Conception"	2:09
2.	"God's Equation"	8:09
3.	"United Alliance"	5:33
4.	"Atomic Firelight"	5:48
5.	"The Prophecy of Pleiades"	6:32
6.	"Search for Life"	2:32
7.	"Coming Home/Exploring Life"	5:59
8.	"Hallo Spaceboy" (David Bowie cover)	6:03
9.	"Enigmatic Mission"	5:43
10.	"Through Osiris' Eyes"	9:15
11.	"Alien Kamikaze"	8:46
Total length:		66:29

DVD disc 2 (live and rehearsal tracks)
No.	Title	Length
1.	"New World Order"	8:16
2.	"Aegean Shores"	5:27
3.	"Supremacy, Our Kind"	7:41
4.	"Farewell"	2:54
5.	"Osiris' Triumphant Return"	9:48
6.	"Of Epic Questions"	6:32
7.	"Resurrection (Back in Time)"	6:48
8.	"The Celestine Prophecy"	6:53
9.	"The Seven Sacred Promise"	7:07
10.	"Caught in a Dream"	8:55
11.	"Infinity Divine"	7:20
Total length:		77:41

Documentary
No.	Title	Length
12.	"1 1/2 Hours On The Road"	93:50

== Personnel ==
=== Pagan's Mind ===
- Nils K. Rue – lead vocals
- Jørn Viggo Lofstad – guitar
- Steinar Krokmo – bass
- Stian Lindaas Kristoffersen – drums
- Ronny Tegner – keyboards
