= Rise of the Tyrant =

Studio album by Arch Enemy
- Released: 24 September 2007
- Recorded: March–May 2007
- Studio: Studio Fredman
- Genre: Melodic death metal
- Length: 48:32
- Label: Century Media
- Producer: Fredrik Nordström and Michael Amott; Daniel Erlandsson (co-production)

Arch Enemy chronology
Doomsday Machine (2005)	Rise of the Tyrant (2007)	Manifesto of Arch Enemy (2009)

Singles from Rise of the Tyrant
- 1. "Revolution Begins"/"Blood on Your Hands" Released: 31 August 2007; 2. "I Will Live Again" Released: 5 May 2008

Professional ratings
Review scores
Source	Rating
AllMusic	3/5 stars
Alternative Press	4/5 stars
Collector's Guide to Heavy Metal	5/10
Kerrang!	4/5 stars
Metal Underground	3.5/5 stars

Rise of the Tyrant is the seventh studio album by Swedish melodic death metal band Arch Enemy. It was produced by Fredrik Nordström and released on 24 September 2007 via Century Media.

== Background ==
Vocalist Angela Gossow commented on Rise of the Tyrant on the band's website that:

I experimented quite a bit with doubling vocal lines on the last album, which I now feel kind of took personality and vocal attack away. So this time it's the classic, one-vocal-track, no-frills, no-effects approach. I put a lot of work and emotions into the lyrics, some of them actually made me cry, most of them made me very, very angry. They deal with the pain and losses we cause each other. To balance these gloomy themes out, we managed to write some lyrics in the vein of 'We Will Rise' — you know, fight songs! There is not only suffering and injustice in this world, but also hope, love and friendship.

Guitarist Michael Amott described it as:

...the ultimate Arch Enemy album!!! To me, this album sounds like the perfect mix of melody and brutality. This album is an organic and honest statement from the band — it's pure fucking metal at its absolute best, the Arch Enemy way! Producer Fredrik Nordström did a killer mix on the record — the sound is big and intense!

Rise of the Tyrant debuted at number 84 on the Billboard 200, selling around 8,900 copies and surpassing Doomsday Machine as the band's highest-charting album.

Music videos were made for the songs "Revolution Begins" and "I Will Live Again", both directed by Patric Ullaeus.

== Track listing ==
No.	Title	Lyrics	Music	Length
1.	"Blood on Your Hands"	Angela Gossow	Michael Amott; Christopher Amott	4:41
2.	"The Last Enemy"	Gossow	M. Amott; C. Amott	4:15
3.	"I Will Live Again"	Gossow	M. Amott; Daniel Erlandsson; C. Amott	3:32
4.	"In This Shallow Grave"	M. Amott	M. Amott; C. Amott; Erlandsson	4:54
5.	"Revolution Begins"	M. Amott	M. Amott; C. Amott	4:11
6.	"Rise of the Tyrant"	Gossow	M. Amott	4:33
7.	"The Day You Died"	Gossow; M. Amott	M. Amott; Erlandsson	4:52
8.	"Intermezzo Liberté" (instrumental)		M. Amott	2:51
9.	"Night Falls Fast"	Gossow	M. Amott	3:18
10.	"The Great Darkness"	Gossow	M. Amott	4:46
11.	"Vultures"	Gossow	C. Amott; M. Amott	6:35
Total length:				48:28

Japanese edition bonus track
No.	Title	Writer(s)	Length
12.	"The Oath" (Kiss cover)	Paul Stanley, Bob Ezrin, Tony Powers	4:16
Total length:			52:44

=== Limited edition ===
Also available is a limited-edition version including a bonus 3" DVD with two live tracks and a documentary on the band's tour of South America.

=== Bonus DVD ===
South American Doomsday 2007:

1. "I Am Legend / Out for Blood (live)" – 5:25
2. "Diva Satanica (live)" – 4:29
3. "Arch Enemy - South American Tour" − 16:07 (includes backstage footage, fan meeting, etc.)

=== Singles ===
1. "Blood on Your Hands"
2. "Revolution Begins"
3. "I Will Live Again"

== Charts ==
Chart (2007)	Peak position
Australian Albums (ARIA Charts)	73
Austrian Albums Chart	50
Belgian Albums Chart (Wallonia)	81
Dutch Albums Chart	83
European Albums Chart (Billboard)	61
Finnish Albums Chart	18
French Albums Chart	72
German Albums Chart	28
Japanese Album Chart (Oricon)	14
Swedish Albums Chart (Sverigetopplistan)	20
Swiss Albums Chart	65
US Billboard 200	84
US Top Rock Albums (Billboard)	22
US Top Hard Rock Albums (Billboard)	10

== Personnel ==
Arch Enemy

- Angela Gossow − vocals
- Michael Amott − guitars, keyboards
- Christopher Amott − guitars
- Sharlee D'Angelo − bass
- Daniel Erlandsson − drums

Production

- Produced by Fredrik Nordström and Michael Amott; co-produced by Daniel Erlandsson
- Mixed by Fredrik Nordström
- Engineered by Patrik J. Sten
- Mastered by Peter In De Betou
- All music arranged by Michael Amott and Daniel Erlandsson. Drum arrangements by Daniel Erlandsson. Vocal arrangements by Angela Gossow. Additional arrangements by Arch Enemy.
- Keyboards by Per Wiberg (not credited in album artwork)
- Artwork by Niklas Sundin

== Release history ==
Region	Date	Label	Format
United Kingdom	24 September 2007	Century Media Records	CD
United States	25 September 2007	Century Media Records	CD
