= Dragonslayer (Dream Evil album) =

Studio album by Dream Evil
- Released: June 25, 2002
- Genre: Heavy metal, power metal
- Length: 46:30
- Label: Century Media
- Producer: Fredrik Nordström and Dream Evil

Dream Evil chronology
Dragonslayer (2002)	Evilized (2003)

Professional ratings
Review scores
Source	Rating
AllMusic	2/5 stars
Rock Hard	8.5/10 stars
Metal.de	7/10 stars
Powermetal.de	
Vampster	
Exclaim!	

Dragonslayer is the debut album by the Swedish heavy metal band Dream Evil. It was released on June 25, 2002. Dragonslayer was the band's original name.

== Track listing ==
1. "Chasing the Dragon" – 4:00
2. "In Flames You Burn" – 4:34
3. "Save Us" – 3:39
4. "Kingdom of the Damned" – 3:54
5. "The Prophecy" – 4:14
6. "The Chosen Ones" – 5:02
7. "Losing You" – 6:00
8. "The 7th Day" – 3:30
9. "Heavy Metal in the Night" – 4:54
10. "H.M.J." – 2:46
11. "Hail to the King" – 3:30
12. "Outro" – 0:16

=== Japan track listing ===
Japan has an alternate track listing.

1. "Chasing the Dragon" – 4:00
2. "Save Us" – 3:39
3. "Dragonheart" – 3:35
4. "Losing You" – 6:00
5. "Hail to the King" – 3:30
6. "Heavy Metal in the Night" – 4:54
7. "The Prophecy" – 4:14
8. "H.M.J." – 2:46
9. "In Flames You Burn" – 4:34
10. "Kingdom of the Damned" – 3:54
11. "The 7th Day" – 3:30
12. "The Chosen Ones" – 5:02
13. "Losing You (instrumental)" – 6:00
14. "Outro" – 0:16

Japan Extended Edition (Bonus)

1. "Take the World - demo" (Japan bonus track, 1st pressing)
2. "The Prophecy - demo" (Japan bonus track, 1st pressing)
3. "Heavy Metal in the Night - demo" (Japan bonus track, 1st pressing)

== Credits ==
- Niklas Isfeldt - vocals
- Fredrik Nordström - guitars, keyboards
- Gus G. - guitars
- Peter Stålfors - bass
- Snowy Shaw - drums

== Gothenburg Philharmonic String Section ==
- Gian Kundig - Vocals (choirs)
- Rikard Bengtsson - Vocals (backing)
- Charlie Storm - Keyboards on "Chasing the Dragon"
- Rikard Bergtsson - Backing vocals
- Patrik J. - Vocals (choirs)
- Tony Jelencovich - Vocals (choirs)
- Richard "Burt" Raynolds - Vocals (choirs)
- Arnold Lindberg - Vocals (choirs)
- Frukost - Vocals (choirs)
- Martin Westerstrand - Vocals (choirs)
- Daniel Gibson - Vocals (choirs)

== Production ==
- Göran Finnberg - Mastering
- Per Stålfors - Editing, Photography
- Fredrik Nordström - Producer, Engineering, Mixing
- Axel Hermann - Cover art, Layout
