= Bleed in Vain =

Bleed in Vain was an Italian melodic death metal band. They released two albums.

One Day Left was recorded with Leonardo Castellani in Heartbeat Studio, and came out in 2004 on the minuscule label Cartel Media. Powermetal.de reviewed the record, finding it to follow the contemporary Swedish style and lack sophistication and innovation. Wrote the reviewer, the band "never manage to add any new facets". The production also sounded "weak and lifeless through the speakers", with the reviewer suspecting "that the post-production was done on a shoestring budget". Rock Hard gave it a poor 4.5 out of 10 rating. "Stay away!", interjected the reviewer of Vampster, who found the album redundant, sleep-inducing and to be the "first flop" of Cartel Media.

Bleed in Vain retained Castellani as a producer, but also visited Fredrik Nordström's Studio Fredman in Gothenburg, and would also master the album in Sweden. Say Everything Will Be Fine followed as their second album in 2006. Norway's Scream Magazine rated it with 4 points out of 6 and "well worth checking". The sound was good, which the reviewer attributed to Fredrik Nordström's production, at the same time as "the band avoids the worst metalcore clichés". Vampster concedede that the band had "learned from past mistakes" and "made a slight course correction". The new album leaned somewhat more towards modern metal such as Machine Head. However, the album could have fared better as a shorter extended play, because the second half of Say Everything Will Be Fine was not up to par. The album could therefore not be recommended.

Several members later played in The Moor.
