= Momento Mori UK =

UK musical group

- Origin: North East England
- Genres: Gothic rock
- Years active: 1987–present
- Labels: Nightbreed Recordings on Myspace, JPB International
- Members: Mark Mori; Jon Mori; Chris Mori
- Past members: Ste Cosgrove; Charlie Charlton; Roy Gibson; Gav Mori; Dunc Arundel; Simon Greenwood; Phil Tyler-Mori; Austin Davey; Paul Mileson
- Website: myspace.com/momentomoriuk

Momento Mori UK are an English band formed in 1987 with a gothic rock influence. They were very active in the UK gothic rock scene and also toured continental Europe. In 1992, after finding it increasingly difficult to gig successfully as the general interest in the gothic rock scene subsided, they stopped playing as a band.

The various band members continued with other projects until 2007 when, after finding each other again via a social network site, they reformed as a celebration of the 20th anniversary of Momento Mori UK.

== History ==
=== Formation and early years (1987–1992) ===
The band originally formed as Momento Mori - without the "UK" suffix. The suffix was later added to avoid confusion after the discovery of a Swedish band of a very similar name.

The name "Momento Mori" is probably a misspelling of memento mori however, Mark Mori has claimed that it was intentional as, a button up shirt left open and worn over a Momento Mori T-shirt may reveal just "Omen". The introduction music of Momento Mori gigs at the time was the Omen theme tune (Carmina Burnana).

Momento Mori were very active in the gothic rock scene and played over 200 gigs. They toured with people such as Every New Dead Ghost, Sins of the Flesh, Dream Disciples, The Marionettes, Christabelle Children, and Rosetta Stone. A tour of continental Europe culminated as headline act at a festival in Czechoslovakia.

They were based in North East England and some of the band members shared a house in Billingham.

Not long after having a vinyl release and being featured in a book about the scene (Gothic Rock), they split up some time in 1992.

=== Rebirth (2007) ===
After Jon Mori contacted Mark Mori via Myspace, the band was reformed with three of the original members. The choice of members was dictated by geographical location. The 2007 line up was Mark Mori, Jon Mori and Roy Gibson. All three had previously played for Momento Mori. Roy had to leave early in 2008 for personal reasons and was replaced with new band member Chris Mori.

A CD incorporating new songs and many of the old favourites from the previous incarnation was released on 3 December 2009 - "In Harm's Way".

Mark relocated to Florida in 2010 which meant playing live was unfeasible for a while. He returned later in the year but personal circumstances saw little activity from the band. 2010 saw just one gig, a slot at Whitby Goth Weekend's Thursday night pre-festival warm up, 2011 saw no gigs and 2012 again saw just one gig in September in Nottingham with In Isolation.

2013 was more productive for the band and saw them play at Dark Waters Festival in June and another couple of shows lined up at Legends, Newcastle, supporting Cruxshadows on 5 August & Carpe Noctum at the Gasworks, Bradford, with Rhombus and The Last Cry on 11 October. A complete overhaul/reprogramming of the electronic elements of the band will coincide with the release of a downloadable remixed mini-album (as yet untitled) featuring some of the tracks from 'In Harms Way' album and maybes another surprise or two towards the end of 2013.

=== The 30th Anniversary (Mori 2.0) (2017–present) ===
May 2017 saw the band invited to open the first ever Marquis Masquerade Gothic Ball, in Whitby, with new lead guitarist Jono Mori.

== Musical style ==
Momento Mori associate themselves with the gothic rock movement and draw most of their influences from bands of that genre. Influences include The Chameleons, The Pixies and The Sisters of Mercy.

== Discography ==
- The Face That Shone (1991) Nightbreed recordings
- In Harms Way (2009) JPB International
- High Ground (2009) Nightbreed Recordings

== Members ==
Current members

- Mark Mori - lead vocals
- Chris Mori – guitar
- Jono Mori- Guitar

Past members

- Jon Mori - (bass, programming, guitars, backing vocals, production)
- Ste Cosgrove - drums
- Charlie Charlton - guitar
- Roy Gibson - guitar and song writer
- Gav Mori - drums
- Dunc Arundel - bass
- Simon Greenwood - bass
- Phil Tyler-Mori - guitar
- Austin Davey - guitar
- Paul Mileson - guitar
