= Follow My Lead =

Follow My Lead may refer to:

- Follow My Lead (band)
- "Follow My Lead", song by 50 Cent from Curtis
- "Follow My Lead", song by rappers Brotha Lynch Hung and C-Bo from Blocc Movement
- "Follow My Lead", song by Justin Timberlake and Esmée Denters
- "Follow My Lead", song by Dev
