= Metal Gods =

Studio album by Dream Evil
- Released: 26 July 2024
- Recorded: 2023–2024
- Genres: Power metal, heavy metal
- Length: 41:25
- Label: Century Media

Dream Evil chronology
Six (2017)	Metal Gods (2024)	Thunder in the Night (2025)

Professional ratings
Review scores
Source	Rating
Metal.de	7/10
Powermetal.de	7.5/10
Rock Hard	7.5/10
Scream Magazine	4/6

Metal Gods is the seventh full-length album by Swedish heavy metal band Dream Evil. The album was released on 26 July 2024, through Century Media Records. This is their first album with new drummer Sören Fardvik. A music video was released for the title track.

== Track listing ==
No.	Title	Length
1.	"Metal Gods"	3:30
2.	"Chosen Force"	5:07
3.	"The Tyrant Dies at Dawn"	3:55
4.	"Lightning Strikes"	4:22
5.	"Fight in the Night"	3:40
6.	"Masters of Arms"	3:40
7.	"Born in Hell"	3:52
8.	"Insane"	4:28
9.	"Night Stalker"	4:38
10.	"Fight for Glory" (Japanese edition bonus track)	3:35
11.	"Y.A.N.A."	4:09
Total length:		45:00

== Personnel ==
- Niklas Isfeldt – vocals
- Fredrik Nordström – guitars
- Mark Black – guitars
- Peter Stålfors – bass
- Sören Fardvik – drums
