= Enigmatic: Calling =

Enigmatic : Calling

Studio album by Pagan's Mind
- Released: 18 April 2005
- Recorded: September–December 2004
- Studios: Mediamaker Studio, Skien, Norway
- Genres: Progressive metal, power metal
- Length: 65:38
- Label: Limb
- Producer: Jörn Viggo Lofstad

Pagan's Mind chronology
Celestial Entrance (2002)	Enigmatic : Calling (2005)	God's Equation (2007)

Professional ratings
Review scores
Source	Rating
Heavymetal.dk	7/10
RevelationZ Magazine	8/10
Rock Hard	8/10

Enigmatic : Calling is the third studio album by the Norwegian progressive metal band Pagan's Mind. According to the liner notes, Enigmatic : Calling was inspired by "a number of great thinkers, philosophers, scientists, writers, and film directors," including Erich von Däniken, Albert Einstein, and Steven Spielberg. Some of the lyrics address "the idea that mankind was originally created, constructed, and placed here on Earth as a genetically modified species created as a project by 'aliens'."

== Track listing ==
All tracks are written by Pagan's Mind.

No.	Title	Length
1.	"The Celestine Prophecy"	7:37
2.	"Enigmatic Mission"	5:17
3.	"Supremacy, Our Kind"	6:01
4.	"Entrance to Infinity"	7:49
5.	"Coming Home" (instrumental)	2:36
6.	"Celestial Calling"	7:00
7.	"Taken"	7:35
8.	"Resurrection (Back in Time)"	6:37
9.	"Appearance"	1:52
10.	"Search for Life"	5:01
11.	"New World Order"	8:13

- The CD also includes an MPEG video clip for "Enigmatic Mission".

== Personnel ==
=== Pagan's Mind ===
- Nils K. Rue – lead vocals, cover art concept, artwork, logo, and booklet background designs
- Jørn Viggo Lofstad – guitar
- Steinar Krokmo – bass
- Stian Kristoffersen – drums
- Ronny Tegner – keyboards

Additional musicians

- Espen Mjøen – backing vocals

=== Production ===
- Recorded by Espen Mjøen at Mediamaker Studio, Skien, Norway in September–December 2004.
- Vocals recorded at Images & Words Studio, Skien, Norway in November–December 2004.
- Guitar solos on "New World Order" and "Enigmatic Mission" recorded by Christian Clausen.
- Edited by John Nilsson at Studio Fredman.
- Mixed by Fredrik Nordström and Patrik J. Sten at Studio Fredman, Gothenburg, Sweden in February 2005.
- Mastered by Morten Lund at Masterhuset, Oslo, Norway in February 2005.
- Front cover "Goddess" photo by Per Stian Johnsen.
- Photos by Thomas Fjelldalen.
