= Eternal Oath =

Swedish band

- Origin: Stockholm, Sweden
- Genres: Symphonic death metal Melodic death metal Gothic metal Progressive metal
- Years active: 1991–2007, 2011–present
- Label: Sound Pollution/Black Lodge Records
- Members: Joni Mäensivu; Petri Tarvainen; Ted Jonsson; Peter Nagy; Mika Kajanen; Johan Adler
- Past members: Timo Hovinen; Stefan Norgren; Peter Wendin; Pelle Almquist; Ted Lundström; Daniel Dziuba; Martin Wiklander

Eternal Oath is a Swedish symphonic/melodic death metal band, formed in 1991 in Stockholm, Sweden. In their 15-year existence, they released three albums, one demo, one EP, and one compilation album. The group was in the process of recording a fourth album, but disbanded in January 2007. In 2011, the band reunited and released a new album in 2013.

Two notable past members are Peter Nagy (former multi-instrumentalist for Mörk Gryning) and Ted Lundström (current Amon Amarth bassist).

== History ==
Ted Jonsson (drums), Petri Tarvainen (guitar) and Joni Mäensivu (vocals) formed Eternal Oath in 1991. In February 1994, the band recorded a three-song promotional tape that secured a deal with Rat Pack Records for one EP. In March 1995, So Silent was recorded. Financial problems with the company delayed the EP's release. The group broke their contract with the label and self-released the EP the following year, financed by Nwrapped Media.

In March 1998, the band recorded their first album, Through The Eyes Of Hatred, for Singapore-based label Pulverised Records. The album was released in early 1999.

In the fall of 2001, the band entered Studio Fredman in Gothenburg, Sweden to record their second album, Righteous. Containing 10 tracks, including a cover of Paradise Lost's "Eternal", the album received a wide response all over the world. Righteous was mixed and engineered by Fredrik Nordström, known for contribution to albums by In Flames, Arch Enemy, At The Gates and Dark Tranquillity.

A few months later, Pulverised Records went bankrupt. In early 2004, the band signed with Sound Pollution/Black Lodge Records, who in turn purchased the entire Eternal Oath back catalog. In June of the same year, Eternal Oath returned to Studio Fredman to record their third and last LP, Wither, be released March 29, 2005 through Black Lodge.

== Breakup and reunion ==
After over 15 years of activity, the band dissolved in early 2007, with some previous members going on to form a new project, Faceshift, later in the year.

In 2011, the band announced that Eternal Oath was reforming after a 5-year absence. This came at the 20th anniversary of the band. The new lineup consists of four of the founding members, with Peter Nagy-Eklof and Petri Tarvainen on guitar, Ted Jonsson on drums and Joni Mäensivu on vocals. They also bolstered their lineup with two new members: Mika Kajanen on bass and Johan Adler on keyboards. Their fourth album, Ghostlands was released in 2013.

== Style ==
While firmly rooted in Swedish melodic death metal, the band's direction has varied on each album, going from blues/folk music progressions similar to Opeth to symphonic experimentation like Hypocrisy. The band had also utilized female gothic metal vocals and traits of doom/death metal.

== Discography ==
=== Studio albums ===
- 1999: Through The Eyes of Hatred (Pulverised Records)
- 2002: Righteous (Greater Art Records)
- 2005: Wither (Black Lodge Records)
- 2013: Ghostlands

=== EPs ===
- 1996: So Silent (NWrapped Media)

=== Demos ===
- 1991: Art of Darkness

=== Compilation ===
- 2006: Re-Released Hatred (So Silent and Through The Eyes Of Hatred on one CD) (Black Lodge Records)

== Members ==
- Joni Mäensivu - vocals
- Ted Jonsson - drums
- Peter Nagy - guitar
- Petri Tarvainen - guitar
- Mika Kajanen - bass guitar
- Johan Adler - keyboards

=== Past members ===
- Timo Hovinen - vocals
- Peter Wendin - bass guitar
- Stefan Norgren - drums (previously keyboards)
- Pelle Almquist - keyboards
- Ted Lundström - bass guitar (1991–1993)
- Daniel Dziuba - guitar (1991–1993)
- Martin Wiklander - bass guitar (1993–1996)
