= Eyes of Fire =

Eyes of Fire may refer to:

- Eyes of Fire (film), a 1983 American horror film
- Eyes of Fire (band), an American musical group
- "Eyes of Fire", a song by Rainbow on their 1982 album Straight Between the Eyes
- "Eyes of Fire", a song by Pagan's Mind on their 2011 album Heavenly Ecstasy
- Eyes of Fire, a 1995 novel by Heather Graham Pozzessere

== See also ==
- Fire-eye, a bird genus
