= To the Grave =

To the Grave may refer to:

== Music ==
- To the Grave (band), an Australian deathcore band
- To the Grave (album), a 2009 album by Iron Fire
