= Celestial Entrance =

Studio album by Pagan's Mind
- Released: 18 November 2002
- Recorded: January–March 2002
- Studio: Klyve Lydstudio, Skien, Norway
- Genre: Progressive rock, progressive metal, power metal
- Length: 71:42
- Label: Limb Music
- Producer: Pagan's Mind, Fredrik Nordström

Pagan's Mind chronology
Infinity Divine (2000)	Celestial Entrance (2002)	Enigmatic: Calling (2005)

Professional ratings
Review scores
Source	Rating
Heavymetal.dk	7/10
Metal1.info	7/10
RevelationZ Magazine	8/10
Rock Hard	8/10

Celestial Entrance is the second studio album by the Norwegian progressive power metal band Pagan's Mind. According to the liner notes, Celestial Entrance was "inspired by some of the theories of Erich von Däniken, the search for extra-terrestrial intelligence, the mystic parallels of the four religions, and ideas launched by certain open-minded scientists throughout the world." The album has received positive feedback from reviewers, with some comparing it to early Queensrÿche, Crimson Glory, Conception, and Dream Theater.

In the mainstream Norwegian press, Celestial Entrance received dice throws of 4 in Tromsø and Varden and 5 (out of 6) in Telemarksavisa.

== Track listing ==
All tracks are written by Pagan's Mind.

No.	Title	Length
1.	"Approaching"	2:48
2.	"Through Osiris' Eyes"	6:08
3.	"Entrance: Stargate"	6:01
4.	"...Of Epic Questions"	6:10
5.	"Dimensions of Fire"	7:28
6.	"Dreamscape Lucidity"	6:39
7.	"The Seven Sacred Promises"	6:28
8.	"Back to the Magic of Childhood, Part 1: Conception"	2:46
9.	"Back to the Magic of Childhood, Part 2: Exploring Life"	9:17
10.	"In Brilliant White Light"	2:44
11.	"Aegean Shores"	5:14
12.	"The Prophecy of Pleiades"	9:53

== Personnel ==
=== Pagan's Mind ===
- Nils K. Rue – lead vocals, art design, logo, layout, and graphics
- Jørn Viggo Lofstad – guitar
- Thorstein Aaby – guitar
- Steinar Krokmo – bass guitar
- Stian Kristoffersen – drums
- Ronny Tegner – keyboards

=== Production ===
- Recorded by Øyvind Eriksen and Per Sælør at Klyve Lydstudio, Skien, Norway in January–March 2002.
- Clean guitars on "Conception" recorded at Mediamaker Studio in January 2002.
- Vocals recorded at Images & Words Studio, Skien, Norway in March 2002.
- Vocal transfer by Espen Mjøen at Mediamaker Studio, Skien, Norway.
- Transfer and editing by Kjetil Nesheim at NLC Studios in April 2002.
- Edited by Patrik J. and Fredrik Nordström.
- Mixed by Fredrik Nordström at Studio Fredman, Gothenburg, Sweden in April 2002.
- Mastered by Morten Lund at Masterhuset, Oslo, Norway in April 2002.
