= Metalmorphosized =

Studio album by Iron Fire
- Released: September 29, 2010
- Genres: Heavy metal, speed metal, power metal
- Length: 57:43
- Label: Napalm
- Producer: Tommy Hansen

Iron Fire chronology
To the Grave (2009)	Metalmorphosized (2010)	Voyage of the Damned (2012)

Professional ratings
Review scores
Source	Rating
Dead Rhetoric	7/10
Eternal Terror	3/6
Metalzone	60%

Metalmorphosized is the sixth album by Danish power metal band Iron Fire, released on September 29, 2010. The album mostly includes tracks that were re-recorded from demos made in the time between the albums On the Edge and Revenge.

== Track listing ==
1. Reborn To Darkness – 5:08
2. Nightmare – 3:48
3. Still Alive – 5:05
4. Back In The Pit – 3:30
5. The Underworld – 6:30
6. Crossroad – 4:28
7. Riding Through Hell – 3:17
8. Left For Dead – 4:11
9. The Graveyard – 3:43
10. My Awakening – 4:25
11. Drowning In Blood – 3:57
12. The Phantom Symphony – 9:41

Bonus tracks

13. Afterlife – 4:40
14. Crossroad (orchestral version) – 4:11

== Personnel ==
- Martin Steene – vocals
- Kirk Backarach – guitars
- Martin Lund – bass
- Fritz Wagner – drums
