= United (Dream Evil album) =

Studio album by Dream Evil
- Released: 13 October 2006
- Recorded: Studio Fredman
- Genres: Heavy metal, power metal
- Length: 48:45
- Label: Century Media
- Producer: Fredrik Nordström

Dream Evil chronology
The Book of Heavy Metal (2004)	United (2006)	Gold Medal in Metal (Alive & Archive) (2008)

Professional ratings
Review scores
Source	Rating
Allmusic	3/5 stars
Noise.fi	5/5 stars
Metal.de	6/10 stars
Powermetal.de	
Vampster	

United is the fourth full-length album by the Swedish heavy metal band Dream Evil. This is the first album by Dream Evil since the departures of Gus G. and Snowy Shaw, both of whom feature as guests on track 12.

== Track listing ==
No.	Title	Length
1.	"Fire! Battle! In Metal!"	3:11
2.	"United"	3:33
3.	"Blind Evil"	4:23
4.	"Evilution"	4:28
5.	"Let Me Out"	4:28
6.	"Higher on Fire"	4:29
7.	"Kingdom at War"	3:11
8.	"Love Is Blind"	4:47
9.	"Falling"	4:01
10.	"Back from the Dead"	4:28
11.	"Doomlord"	4:42
12.	"My Number One" (Elena Paparizou cover)	3:09

Japanese release tracklist
No.	Title	Length
1.	"Introduction" (Japan bonus)	0:31
2.	"Falling"	4:01
3.	"Fire! Battle! In Metal!"	3:11
4.	"United"	3:33
5.	"Blind Evil"	4:23
6.	"Evilution"	4:28
7.	"Let Me Out"	4:28
8.	"Higher on Fire"	4:29
9.	"Kingdom at War"	3:11
10.	"Love Is Blind"	4:47
11.	"Pain Patrol" (Japan bonus)	3:16
12.	"Back from the Dead"	4:28
13.	"Lady of Pleasure" (Japan bonus)	3:28
14.	"Doomlord"	4:42
15.	"My Number One" (Elena Paparizou cover)	3:09

Limited Edition Bonus Disc
No.	Title	Length
1.	"Calling Your Name"	3:45
2.	"Dynamite"	4:08
3.	"Into the Unknown"	4:27
4.	"I Will Never"	3:55
5.	"Vengeance"	3:15

== Credits ==
- Niklas Isfeldt - Vocals
- Fredrik Nordström - Guitars
- Mark Black - Guitars
- Peter Stålfors - Bass
- Pat Power aka Patrik J - Drums
