= In the Night (Dream Evil album) =

Studio album by Dream Evil
- Released: (Europe) 25 January 2010 (United States) 26 January 2010
- Genre: Power metal, heavy metal
- Length: 46:31
- Label: Century Media
- Producer: Fredrik Nordström

Dream Evil chronology
Gold Medal in Metal (Alive & Archive) (2008)	In the Night (2010)	Six (2017)

Professional ratings
Review scores
Source	Rating
Allmusic	4/5 stars
Blabbermouth	8/10 stars
Sounds Of Rock	8.5/10 stars
Metal.de	7/10 stars
Powermetal.de	8/10 stars
Vampster	

In the Night is the fifth full-length album by the Swedish heavy metal band Dream Evil.

== Track listing ==
No.	Title	Lyrics	Music	Length
1.	"Immortal"	Niklas Isfeldt	Daniel Varghamne	4:38
2.	"In the Night"	Pat Power	Power	3:15
3.	"Bang Your Head"	Isfeldt	Fredrik Nordström, Isfeldt	3:52
4.	"See the Light"	Isfeldt, Peter Stålfors, Nordström	Isfeldt, Nordström	3:40
5.	"Electric"	Power	Power	3:50
6.	"Frostbite"	Isfeldt, Stålfors	Stålfors, Isfeldt	3:31
7.	"On the Wind"	Isfeldt	Varghamne, Isfeldt	3:45
8.	"The Ballad"	Isfeldt, Power	Nordström	4:52
9.	"In the Fires of the Sun"	Varghamne	Stålfors, Varghamne, Isfeldt	4:41
10.	"Mean Machine"	Stålfors	Stålfors, Isfeldt	4:05
11.	"Kill, Burn, Be Evil"	Varghamne	Varghamne	2:51
12.	"The Unchosen One"	Peter Isfeldt	Nordström, Isfeldt	3:37
Total length:				46:31

Limited edition bonus tracks
No.	Title	Lyrics	Music	Length
13.	"Good Nightmare"	Stålfors	Stålfors, Isfeldt	4:00
14.	"The Return"	Stålfors, Nordström, Isfeldt	Nordström, Stålfors, Isfeldt	3:32

Japanese edition bonus tracks
No.	Title	Lyrics	Music	Length
13.	"Good Nightmare"	Stålfors	Stålfors, Isfeldt	4:00
14.	"The Return"	Stålfors, Nordström, Isfeldt	Nordström, Stålfors, Isfeldt	3:32
15.	"Save Yourself"	Stålfors	Stålfors, Isfeldt	3:56
16.	"Black Hole"	Power	Power	3:26

== Personnel ==
- Nick Night (aka Niklas Isfeldt) - vocals
- Dannee Demon (aka Daniel Varghamne) - lead guitar
- Ritchie Rainbow (aka Fredrik Nordström) - rhythm guitar
- Pete Pain (aka Peter Stålfors) - bass guitar
- Pat Power (aka Patrik Jerksten) - drums
