= The Book of Heavy Metal =

Studio album by Dream Evil
- Released: 13 July 2004
- Recorded: December 2003 and February 2004
- Genre: Heavy metal, power metal
- Length: 49:55
- Label: Century Media
- Producer: Fredrik Nordström

Dream Evil chronology
Children of the Night (2003)	The Book of Heavy Metal (2004)	United (2006)

Professional ratings
Review scores
Source	Rating
Rock Hard	8/10 stars
Metal.de	6/10 stars
Powermetal.de	7.5/10 stars
Noise.fi	3/5 stars
Vampster	

The Book of Heavy Metal is the third full-length album by the Swedish heavy metal band Dream Evil. This is the last album to feature Gus G. and Snowy Shaw.

== Track listing ==
No.	Title	Lyrics	Music	Length
1.	"The Book of Heavy Metal (March of the Metallians)"	Snowy Shaw	Shaw	5:25
2.	"Into the Moonlight"	Niklas Isfeldt, Shaw	Shaw	4:19
3.	"The Sledge"	Shaw	Shaw, Fredrik Nordström	2:59
4.	"No Way"	Shaw	Nordström, Gus G	3:19
5.	"Crusaders' Anthem"	Isfeldt, Shaw	Isfeldt, Shaw, Nordström, Peter Stålfors	4:21
6.	"Let's Make Rock"	Nordström, Gus G, Isfeldt, Stålfors, Shaw	Nordström, Gus G, Isfeldt, Stålfors, Shaw	4:03
7.	"Tired"	Shaw	Nordström, Shaw	3:49
8.	"Chosen Twice"	Shaw	Nordström, Shaw	4:22
9.	"M.O.M."	Shaw	Shaw	3:33
10.	"The Mirror"	Isfeldt, Stålfors	Isfeldt	3:46
11.	"Only for the Night"	Shaw	Shaw	4:10
12.	"Unbreakable Chain"	Shaw	Gus G, Shaw	5:53
Total length:				49:55

Japanese Release
No.	Title	Lyrics	Music	Length
1.	"The Enemy" (Japan bonus track)	Shaw	Nordström, Shaw	3:15
2.	"Into the Moonlight"	Isfeldt, Shaw	Shaw	4:19
3.	"Chapter 6" (Japan bonus track)	Shaw	Shaw	4:03
4.	"No Way"	Shaw	Nordström, Gus G	3:19
5.	"Crusaders' Anthem"	Isfeldt, Shaw	Isfeldt, Shaw, Nordström, Stålfors	4:21
6.	"The Book of Heavy Metal (March of the Metallians)"	Shaw	Shaw	5:25
7.	"The Sledge"	Shaw	Shaw, Nordström	2:59
8.	"Tired"	Shaw	Nordström, Shaw	3:49
9.	"Unbreakable Chain"	Shaw	Gus G, Shaw	5:53
10.	"M.O.M."	Shaw	Shaw	3:33
11.	"The Mirror"	Isfeldt, Stålfors	Isfeldt	3:46
12.	"Only for the Night"	Shaw	Shaw	4:10
13.	"Chosen Twice"	Shaw	Nordström, Shaw	4:22
Total length:				53:14

== Notes ==
- "Let's Make Rock" is omitted from this album because it appears as track 13 for the Japanese edition of 2003's "Evilized".
- The "METAL!" shout present at the beginning of "The Book of Heavy Metal" on the U.S. version is removed and placed as the intro to "The Enemy" instead.

== DVD ==
- "Tour 2003" (Footage of the band on tour, and live footage of the band performing 'M.O.M.', 'Children Of The Night' and 'Heavy Metal In The Night') – 35:13
- "The Making Of The Book Of Heavy Metal" (The making of the band's new album) – 26:26

== Personnel ==
Band

- Niklas Isfeldt - vocals
- Fredrik Nordström - rhythm guitars, backing vocals
- Gus G. - lead guitars
- Peter Stålfors - bass, backing vocals
- Snowy Shaw - drums, backing vocals

Guest/Session members

- Mats Olausson - organ and keyboards on 2, 5, 8, 10, and 12
- Andy Alkman - 2nd lead vocals on 4
- Per Edvardsson - harmony vocals on 5 and 11
- Patrik J. - choir vocals on 1, 3, 4, 5, 7 and 10
- Råberra Axelsson - guitar solo on 1
- "Metal" Mike Chlasciak - guitar solo on 4
