= Thunder in the Night (EP) =

EP by Dream Evil
- Released: 11 April 2025
- Recorded: 2023–2024
- Genres: Power metal; heavy metal
- Length: 15:24
- Label: Century Media

Dream Evil chronology
Metal Gods (2024)	Thunder in the Night (2025)

Professional ratings
Review scores
Source	Rating
Metal.de	7.5/10
Metal-Roos	4/5
Powermetal.de	7/10
Rock Hard	7.5/10

Metal Gods is the third EP by Swedish heavy metal band Dream Evil. It was released on 11 April 2025, through Century Media Records.

== Track listing ==
No.	Title	Length
1.	"Thunder in the Night"	4:07
2.	"Calm in the Storm"	4:11
3.	"Fight for Glory"	3:35
4.	"Criminal"	3:31
Total length:		15:24

== Personnel ==
- Niklas Isfeldt - vocals
- Fredrik Nordström - guitars
- Mark Black - guitars
- Peter Stålfors - bass
- Sören Fardvik - drums
