= Evilized =

Studio album by Dream Evil
- Released: July 27, 2003
- Genre: Heavy metal, power metal
- Length: 47:13
- Label: Century Media
- Producer: Fredrik Nordström and Dream Evil

Dream Evil chronology
Dragonslayer (2002)	Evilized (2003)	Children of the Night (2003)

Professional ratings
Review scores
Source	Rating
AllMusic	4/5 stars
Rock Hard	8.5/10 stars
Metal.de	7/10 stars
Powermetal.de	7.5/10 stars
Vampster	
Noise.fi	2/5 stars

Evilized is the second full-length album by the Swedish heavy metal band Dream Evil.

== Track listing ==
No.	Title	Lyrics	Music	Length
1.	"Break the Chains"	Gus G	Gus G	3:32
2.	"By My Side"	Fredrik Nordström, Gus G	Nordström, Gus G	3:38
3.	"Fight You 'Till the End"	Peter Stålfors, Niklas Isfeldt	Stålfors, Isfeldt	3:53
4.	"Evilized"	Stålfors, Isfeldt, Nordström	Stålfors, Isfeldt	4:43
5.	"Invisible"	Snowy Shaw	Shaw	2:53
6.	"Bad Dreams"	Shaw	Shaw	3:10
7.	"Forevermore"	Shaw	Nordström	5:08
8.	"Children of the Night"	Dream Evil	Gus G, Nordström, Shaw	4:45
9.	"Live a Lie"	Stålfors, Isfeldt	Stålfors, Isfeldt	3:26
10.	"Fear the Night"	Gus G, Isfeldt, Stålfors	Gus G, Isfeldt, Stålfors	3:47
11.	"Made of Metal"	Nordström, Gus G, Shaw	Nordström, Gus G, Shaw	3:55
12.	"The End"	Shaw	Shaw	4:23
Total length:				47:13

Japanese edition bonus tracks
No.	Title	Lyrics	Music	Length
13.	"Let's Make Rock"	Nordström, Gus G, Isfeldt, Stålfors, Shaw	Nordström, Gus G, Isfeldt, Stålfors, Shaw	4:03
14.	"Betrayed"	Isfeldt, Stålfors	Stålfors, Isfeldt	4:08
15.	"Evilized - unplugged" (1st pressing)	Stålfors, Isfeldt, Nordström	Stålfors, Isfeldt	4:53

Note: "Let's Make Rock" does not appear for the U.S. version of Evilized but appears as Track 6 on the U.S. version of 2004's "The Book of Heavy Metal"

== Credits ==
- Niklas Isfeldt - vocals
- Fredrik Nordström - guitars, keyboards
- Gus G. - guitars
- Peter Stålfors - bass
- Snowy Shaw - drums
