= Voyage of the Damned (album) =

Studio album by Iron Fire
- Released: January 27, 2012
- Genres: Progressive metal, power metal, speed metal
- Length: 60:44
- Label: Napalm
- Producer: Jakob Hansen

Iron Fire chronology
Metalmorphosized (2010)	Voyage of the Damned (2012)	Among the Dead (2016)

Professional ratings
Review scores
Source	Rating
Dead Rhetoric	7.5/10
Eternal Terror	3.5/6
Metal Express Radio	9/10
Metal.de	8/10
Time for Metal	9/10

Voyage of the Damned is the seventh full-length album by the Danish power metal band Iron Fire, released on January 27, 2012.

== Track listing ==
1. The Dark Beyond - 1:26
2. Enter Oblivion OJ-666 - 4:13
3. Taken - 5:12
4. Slaughter of Souls - 5:13
5. Leviathan - 5:54
6. The Final Odyssey - 5:58
7. Ten Years in Space - 4:12
8. Voyage of the Damned - 10:07
9. With Different Eyes - 4:33
10. Dreams of the Dead Moon - 5:18
11. Verge to Collide - 4:34
12. Realm of Madness - 4:04

Bonus track

13. Warmaster of Chaos - 3:36

== Personnel ==
- Martin Steene - vocals
- Martin Lund - bass
- Kirk Backarach - guitars
- Fritz Wagner - drums

Guest musicians

- Rune Stiassny - keyboards, orchestral arrangements
- Nils K. Rue - vocals on "Voyage of the Damned"
- Dave Ingram - vocals on "Slaughter Of Souls"
- Ivan Grosmeyer - vocals on "Taken"
- Bjørn Nilsen - guitar solo on "Warmaster of Chaos"
