= Godgory =

Swedish death metal band

- Origin: Karlstad, Sweden
- Genres: Melodic death metal Doom metal Gothic metal
- Years active: 1992–2004
- Label: Nuclear Blast
- Members: Matte Andersson; Erik Andersson
- Past members: Mikael Dahlqvist; Stefan Grundel; Henrik Lindström; Fredric Danielsson; Thomas Heder

Godgory was a Swedish melodic death metal/death doom metal band that drummer Erik Andersson and vocalist Matte Andersson formed in 1992.

== Formation and Invasion Records era ==
Forming in 1992, Godgory started covering bands such as Napalm Death, Entombed, Cemetary, Unleashed, and Grave. In April 1994, they entered Unisound Studio and recorded their debut demo, Demo-94, consisting of original material.

The band sent the demo to labels and zines around the world and received a positive response. One label wanted to sign Godgory for a full-length CD, so the band returned to Unisound in November 1994 and recorded their debut album, Sea of Dreams, in one weekend. After recording was complete, the deal with the label fell through. The band had a recorded album and no label to release it.

The band sent the completed tape to labels in search of a new record deal. German label Invasion Records released Sea of Dreams. They signed the band to release a second CD. Sea of Dreams came out in January 1996, over a year after its recording.

The debut album received good reviews in magazines around the world and sold around 5,000 copies. Godgory returned to Unisound in October 1996 to record the follow-up album Shadow's Dance. The band added keyboardist Thomas Heder. In contrast to the "live" recording style of Sea of Dreams, they spent three weeks recording each instrument separately.

Upon release, Shadow's Dance received good reviews and reached the 7th place on the Rockhards Dynamite list. Shadow's Dance sold around 10,000 copies.

== New line-up and Nuclear Blast era ==
After Godgory had recorded Shadow's Dance, Erik and Matte parted ways with Mikael Dahlqvist (guitars), Fredric Danielsson (bass), and Thomas Heder (keyboards). The three were involved with progressive metal band World of Silence and made it their priority. Erik and Matte wanted members who would devote all their energy to Godgory. Around this time, rhythm guitarist Stefan Grundel (formerly Olsson) left Godgory to concentrate on his education.

With two remaining members, the band searched for another record deal. Godgory had heard that Nuclear Blast were interested in them, so they inquired with the label; this resulted in a new, two-album deal. In May 1998, Godgory recorded the song "Conspiracy of Silence" for the Nuclear Blast sampler Beauty in Darkness Vol. 3. This song was the first Godgory material recorded outside Unisound. It was recorded at Studio Fasaden in Hagfors, Sweden.

In October 1998, the band returned to Studio Fasaden to record their third full-length, Resurrection. Since Godgory was not a full band at this point (despite an interest in locating additional full-time members), they recruited former members Mikael Dahlqvist and Thomas Heder as temporary session members. Godgory invited Fredrik Olsson to participate as an additional vocalist, as he had written many lyrics for the band. Olsson handled whispered vocals on the album, while Matte recorded all harsh vocals. Recording took place over a period of five weeks. They released Resurrection in May 1999 to positive reception. The album placed at number 8 on the Rockhard Dynamite list.

Two years after the release of Resurrection, Godgory entered Studio Fredman to record their fourth album, Way Beyond, with producer Fredrik Nordström. Mikael Dahlqvist, Thomas Heder, and Fredrik Olsson joined the band on a session basis, along with World of Silence member Henrik Lindström on guitars and bass. Erik switched from drums to keyboards, and they recorded the album with programmed drums. Way Beyond was released in October 2001.

The band split up in 2004.

== Discography ==
=== Demo albums ===
1994 – Demo '94

=== Studio albums ===
Date of release	Title	Label
1995	Sea of Dreams	Invasion Records
1996	Shadow's Dance	Invasion Records
1999	Resurrection	Nuclear Blast
2001	Way Beyond	Nuclear Blast
