= Demi Monde Bizarros =

Studio album by Notre Dame
- Released: February 16, 2004
- Genre: Goth Rock; Black Metal
- Length: 41:15
- Label: Osmose Productions
- Producer: Snowy Shaw

Professional ratings
Review scores
Source	Rating
AllMusic	3/5
Metal.de	7/10
Noise.fi	3/5
Rock Hard	6.5/10

Demi Monde Bizarros subtitled "Songs about sex, satan and sado-masochism" is the fourth and last album by the Swedish metal band Notre Dame, released with two different covers. The album has 14 songs and it closes with two live tracks, one of them being a cover song, that fit the studio tracks quite well and re-enforce the theatrical atmosphere even more.

== Critical reception ==
AllMusic called the album "astonishingly fun" and noted the track "My Ride into Afterlife" as a "bona fide classic". Vampster gave a positive review but said the compositions are weaker than on previous albums. Metal.de highlighted the tracks "Munsters!" and "My Ride into Afterlife" but called the album overall above average.

== Track listing ==
No.	Title	Length
1.	"The Thing..." (Instrumental)	0:46
2.	"Munsters!"	3:26
3.	"The Ride" (Instrumental)	0:30
4.	"My Ride into Afterlife"	6:47
5.	"The Stripper"	3:04
6.	"Verbal Diarrhoea"	3:31
7.	"Bon Voyage Mutherfucker!" (Instrumental)	1:57
8.	"The Master, The Servant and the Slave"	3:49
9.	"Beyond the Threshold of Pain"	3:25
10.	"Hitmusic for Hitmen"	3:08
11.	"Demi Monde Bizarros"	2:41
12.	"S/S Hellride" (Instrumental)	2:00
13.	"These Boots Are Made for Walking (live)" (Nancy Sinatra Cover)	4:33
14.	"The Wurld Is Sick...And So Are We (live)"	1:30
Total length:		41:15

== Credits ==
- Snowy Shaw - vocals, guitar and keyboard
- Mannekin De Sade - drums
- Vampirella - vocals
