= Infinity Divine =

Studio album by Pagan's Mind
- Released: 1 November 2000
- Recorded: September–October 2000
- Studios: Klyve Lydstudio, Skien, Norway
- Genres: Progressive metal, power metal
- Length: 68:16
- Label: FaceFront
- Producer: Pagan's Mind

Pagan's Mind chronology
Infinity Divine (2000)	Celestial Entrance (2002)

Professional ratings
Review scores
Source	Rating
Heavymetal.dk	7/10
Rock Hard	5.5/10 (original); 8/10 (re-recording)
Østlendingen	3/6

Infinity Divine is the debut album by the Norwegian progressive metal band Pagan's Mind. In 2004, the band revisited the album, re-releasing it with re-recorded parts and a new mix, with many songs featuring drastically altered arrangements. The re-recorded version omits the song "Moonlight Pact" and adds a new recording of "Embracing Fear" and a cover of "At the Graves" by King Diamond.

== Track listing ==
All tracks are written by Pagan's Mind, except where noted.

No.	Title	Length
1.	"Prelude to Paganism"	1:03
2.	"Caught in a Dream"	8:42
3.	"Infinity Divine"	7:49
4.	"Embracing Fear" (lyrics by Øyvind Vang and Nils K. Rue)	6:03
5.	"Astral Projection"	6:44
6.	"Angels' Serenity"	4:51
7.	"Dawning of the Nemesis"	7:04
8.	"King's Quest"	6:39
9.	"Twilight Arise"	4:36
10.	"Moonlight Pact"	7:07
11.	"A New Beginning"	7:38

All tracks are written by Pagan's Mind, except where noted.

2004 re-recorded version
No.	Title	Length
1.	"Prelude to Paganism"	1:02
2.	"Caught in a Dream"	6:02
3.	"Infinity Divine"	6:12
4.	"Embracing Fear" (lyrics by Øyvind Vang and Nils K. Rue)	5:56
5.	"Astral Projection"	5:41
6.	"Angels' Serenity"	4:20
7.	"Dawning of the Nemesis"	5:09
8.	"King's Quest"	5:39
9.	"Twilight Arise"	4:35
10.	"A New Beginning"	8:08
11.	"Embracing Fear 2004" (lyrics by Øyvind Vang and Nils K. Rue)	6:17
12.	"At the Graves" (King Diamond cover; written by King Diamond)	9:34

== Personnel ==
=== Pagan's Mind ===
- Nils K. Rue – lead vocals
- Jørn Viggo Lofstad – guitar
- Thorstein Aaby – guitar
- Steinar Krokmo – bass
- Stian Kristoffersen – drums
- Ronny Tegner – keyboards (2004 re-recorded version only)

Additional musicians (original release)

- Ronny Tegner – keyboards
- Bente Aanesen – backing vocals on "Astral Projection"

=== Production ===
Original release:

- Recorded by Øyvind Eriksen and Per Sælør at Klyve Lydstudio, Skien, Norway in September–October 2000.
- Mixed by Ronnie Le Tekrø and Dag Stokke at Studio Studio, Nyhagen, Norway in September–October 2000.
- Mastered by Ola Johansen at Masterhuset, Oslo, Norway in October 2000.

Re-recorded version:

- Vocals re-recorded at Images & Words Studio, Skien, Norway in January 2004.
- "Embracing Fear 2004" re-recorded by Espen Mjøen at Mediamaker Studio, Skien, Norway in September 2003.
- Additional editing and engineering by Espen Mjøen at Mediamaker Studio.
- Remixed and mastered by Tommy Hansen at Jailhouse Studio, Denmark in January 2004.

== Notes ==
- Glen Drover and Gus G. appear on the cover of the King Diamond song "At the Graves," playing the first and second solos, respectively.
