= Beyond the Void =

Studio album by Iron Fire
- Released: 8 March 2019
- Recorded: 2018
- Studio: Antfarm, Aarhus, Denmark
- Genre: Power metal, hard rock, heavy metal, thrash metal
- Length: 44:07
- Label: Crime

Iron Fire chronology
Among the Dead (2016)	Beyond the Void (2019)

Professional ratings
Review scores
Source	Rating
Metal Express Radio	5/10
Rockmagazine.net	9/10
Sonic Perspectives	8.8/10

Beyond the Void is the ninth full-length album by Danish power metal band Iron Fire, released on 8 March 2019.

== Track listing ==
1. Intro – 0:39
2. Beyond the Void – 4:02
3. Final Warning – 3:54
4. Cold Chains of the North – 3:39
5. Wrong Turn – 3:45
6. Bones and Gasoline – 4:53
7. Old Habits Die Hard – 3:51
8. Judgement Day – 4:29
9. To Hell and Back – 3:34
10. One More Bullet – 4:06
11. The Devil's Path – 3:49
12. Out of Nowhere – 3:26

== Personnel ==
- Martin Steene – vocals, bass
- Kirk Backarach – guitars
- Gunnar Olsen – drums
