= Among the Dead (album) =

Studio album by Iron Fire
- Released: 16 September 2016
- Recorded: 2014–2015
- Studios: Death Island Studio, Nykøbing Mors, Denmark
- Genres: Power metal, progressive metal, speed metal
- Length: 40:50
- Label: Crime

Iron Fire chronology
| Voyage of the Damned (2012) | Among the Dead (2016) | Beyond the Void (2019) |

Professional ratings
Review scores
| Source | Rating |
|---|---|
| Dead Rhetoric | 8/10 |
| Distorted Sound | 6/10 |
| Metal Express Radio | 5.5/10 |
| Metal Revolution | 68% |
| New Noise Magazine | 3.5/5 |

Among the Dead is the eighth full-length album by the Danish power metal band Iron Fire, released on 16 September 2016.

== Track listing ==
1. Intro (The Lost City) - 1:16
2. Among the Dead – 4:13
3. Hammer of the Gods – 3:54
4. Tornado of Sickness – 3:58
5. Higher Ground – 3:45
6. Iron Eagle – 3:44
7. Made to Suffer – 4:11
8. The Last Survivor – 3:30
9. No Sign of Life – 3:34
10. Ghost from the Past – 4:19
11. When the Lights Go Out – 4:26

Bonus track

12. For Whom the Bell Tolls (Metallica cover) - 5:00

== Personnel ==
- Martin Steene – vocals, bass
- Kirk Backarach – guitars
- Gunnar Olsen – drums
