= Blade of Triumph =

Studio album by Iron Fire
- Released: 29 June 2007
- Recorded: Hellfire Studio; Area 51 Studio; Ear Plug Studio
- Genre: Heavy metal; power metal
- Length: 54:52
- Label: Napalm Records
- Producer: Fredrik Nordström

Iron Fire chronology
Revenge (2006)	Blade of Triumph (2007)	To the Grave (2009)

Blade of Triumph is the fourth full-length album by Danish power metal band Iron Fire. It was released in 2007 by Napalm Records.

== Track listing ==
1. "Dragonheart" - 5:47
2. "Bloodbath of Knights" - 4:23
3. "Dawn of Victory" - 4:52
4. "Lord of the Labyrinth" - 4:23
5. "Bridges Will Burn" - 4:38
6. "Follow the Sign" - 4:37
7. "Steel Invaders" - 4:32
8. "Jackal's Eye" - 5:36
9. "Legend of the Magic Sword" - 4:27
10. "Gladiator's Path" - 4:11
11. "Blade of Triumph" - 7:26

== Personnel ==
- Martin Steene - vocals
- Kirk Backarach - guitars, keyboards
- J.J. - guitars
- Martin Lund - bass
- Jens B. - drums
