= Follow My Lead (band) =

Irish metalcore band

- Origin: Donegal, Ireland
- Genres: Metalcore; Nu metalcore; Post-hardcore
- Years active: 2012–2018
- Labels: inVogue Records; Fearless Records
- Past members: Danny Bochkow; Niall Friel; Robbie Thorne; Declan Graham; Ryan Dawson; Matie Foxx; William Woods
- Website: www.facebook.com/ followmyleadband

Follow My Lead was an Irish metalcore band from Donegal.

== History ==
=== Formation and signing to Fearless records ===
The band was formed in 2013 in Donegal, Ireland and consisted of vocalist Ryan Dawson, guitarists Niall Friell and Robbie Thorne, as well as bassist Declan Graham and drummer William Woods. Dawson left the group for unknown reasons in first year of existence and was replaced by Mattie Foxx.

On 23 August 2013 the band self-released their first EP called Sleepless for digital download. The music video for Crestfallen was released on YouTube on BryanStars's YouTube channel. The band announced at the end of 2014 that they flew to Gothenburg, Sweden to work on their debut album together with Fredrik Nordström who had worked with Bring Me the Horizon, In Flames and Architects in the past at Studio Fredman. The band signed a label contract with Fearless Records in December 2014 and released XIII as digital download on their website.

=== Departure of Mattie Foxx signing to InVogue records ===
While working on their album, Mattie Foxx announced his departure from Follow My Lead on 18 May 2015 leaving the remaining musicians without vocalist. Eight weeks later the band announced that Danny Bochkow, who played guitar in Irish metal band Displaced would replace Foxx as vocalist. Fearless Records dropped the band with only one song released on that label. The band announced in April 2016 that they signed with inVogue Records. They announced their debut album to be released sometime in 2016.

=== Spit, Kick, Revolt. ===
Along with the announcement of signing to inVogue Records, the band released the music video for their single Jugular and first information about the debut album. The album is called Spit, Kick, Revolt. and was announced to be released on 17 June 2016. After the release of the album the band toured the United Kingdom between 15 and 23 July.

== Musical style ==
The music of Follow My Lead can be described as a typical version of Post-hardcore which can feature elements of Metalcore. The vocals switch between screams and clean vocals. There are even elements of Rap vocals listenable. The musicians name acts like While She Sleeps, Of Mice & Men and Bring Me the Horizon as musical influences.

Due to the use of rap vocals and Turntables the music can be described lightly as Nu Metal. The music was compared to the early Linkin Park.

== Discography ==
- 2013: Sleepless (EP)
- 2016: Spit, Kick, Revolt. (Album, inVogue Records)

== Band members ==
Final Line-Up

- Danny Bochkow − lead vocals (2015–2018)
- Niall Friel – lead guitar (2012–2018)
- Robbie Thorne – rhythm guitar (2012–2018)
- Declan Graham – bass, backing vocals (2012–2018)

Former members

- Ryan Dawson – lead vocals (2012–2013)
- Mattie Foxx – lead vocals (2012–2015)
- William Woods – drums, percussion (2012–2017)

Timeline
