= Snowy Shaw =

Swedish heavy metal musician

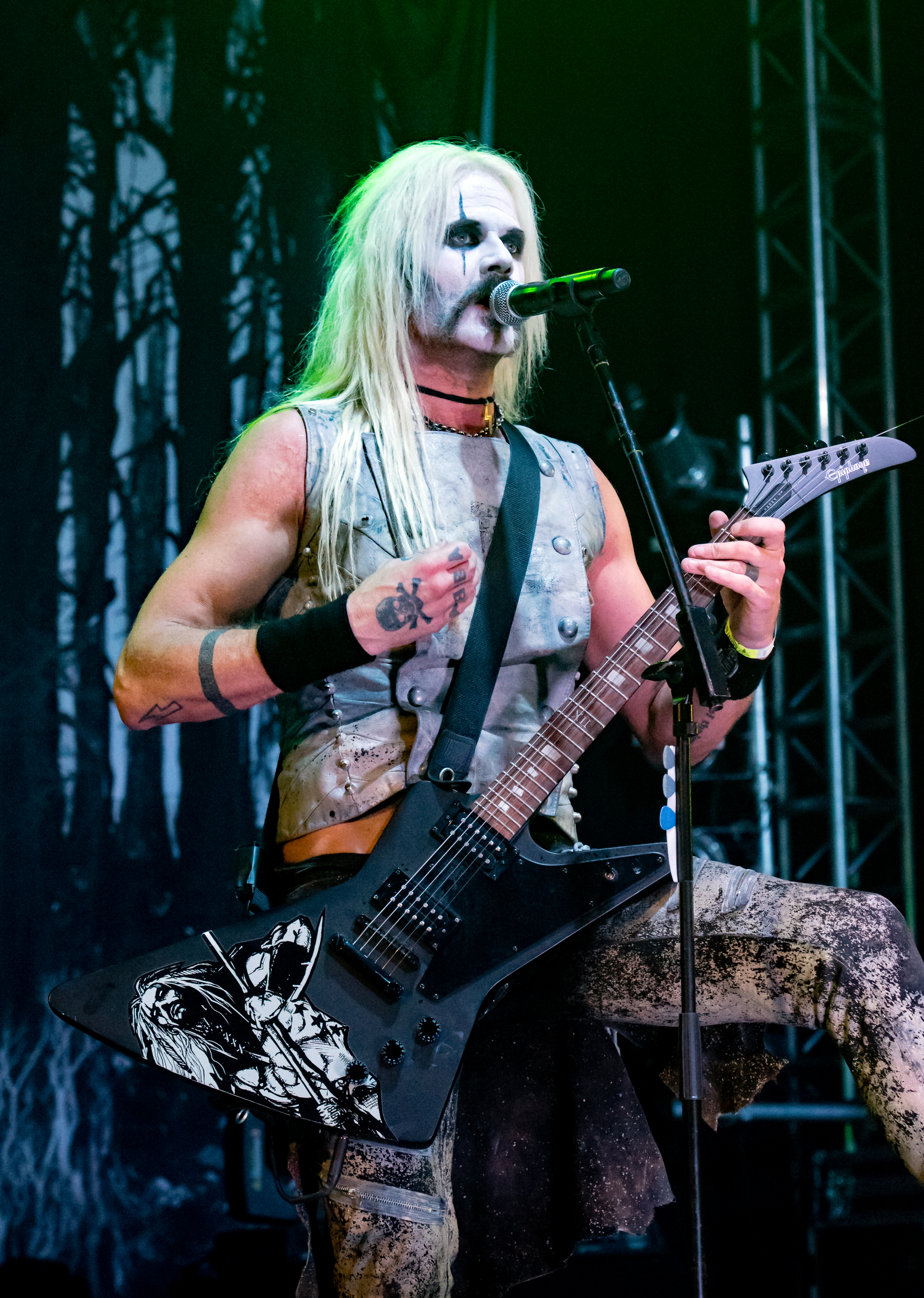
- Shaw in 2016

Background information
- Birth name: Tommie Mike Christer Helgesson
- Born: 25 July 1968 (age 57)
- Origin: Gothenburg, Sweden
- Genres: Heavy metal, black metal, doom metal, symphonic metal, gothic metal, power metal, punk rock, shock rock
- Occupation(s): Musician, songwriter
- Instrument(s): Drums, guitar, bass, keyboards, vocals
- Years active: 1989–present
- Website: snowyshaw.net

Snowy Shaw (born Tommie Mike Christer Helgesson; 25 July 1968) is a Swedish musician based in the port city of Gothenburg in the west coast of Sweden. He has played with many heavy metal bands, like King Diamond, Dream Evil, Mercyful Fate, IllWill, and Memento Mori. He founded the band Notre Dame.

Snowy is adept at playing guitar as well as drums. He is a primary songwriter in Dream Evil. In October 2006, Snowy joined the symphonic metal band Therion, singing on the Gothic Kabbalah album and participated in the 2007 tour together with already established singer Mats Levén. In August 2010, he was announced as the new bassist and clean vocalist of symphonic black metal band Dimmu Borgir, although he was only officially a member for one day then quit and rejoined Therion.

== Discography ==
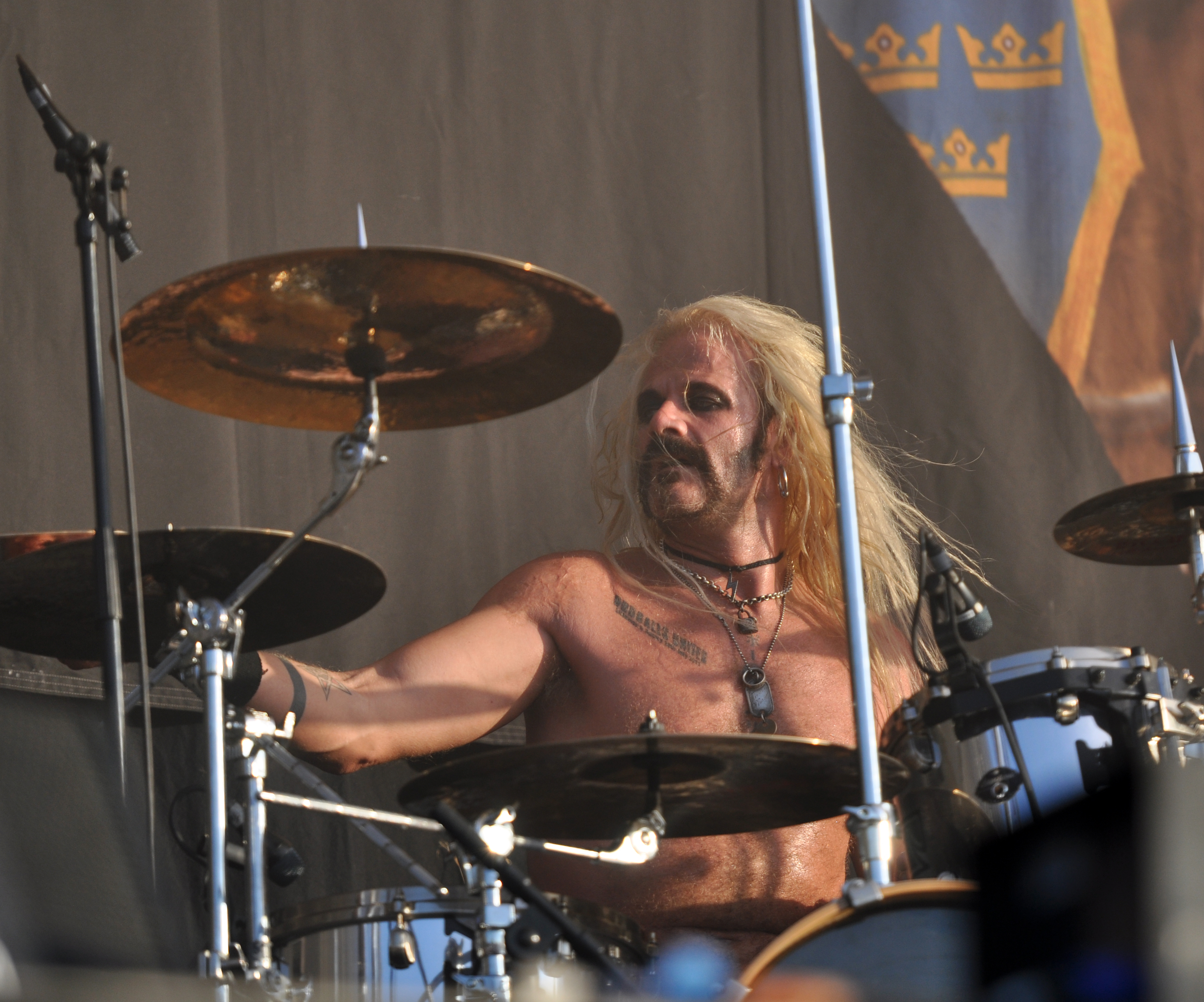
Snowy Shaw performing at Wacken Open Air 2013

=== With King Diamond ===
- The Eye (1990)

=== With Mercyful Fate ===
- Time (1994)

=== With Memento Mori ===
- Rhymes of Lunacy (1993)
- Life, Death, and Other Morbid Tales (1994)

=== With Notre Dame ===
- Coming Soon to a Théatre Near You!!! (1998)
- Le Théâtre du Vampire (1999)
- Nightmare Before Christmas (1999)
- Abattoir, Abattoir du Noir (2000)
- Coming Soon to a Theatre Near You, the 2nd (2002)
- Demi Monde Bizarros (2004)
- Creepshow Freakshow Peepshow (2005)

=== With Dream Evil ===
- Dragonslayer (2002)
- Evilized (2003)
- Children of the Night (EP, 2003)
- The First Chapter (EP, 2004)
- The Book of Heavy Metal (2004)
- Gold Medal in Metal (2005)

=== With Loud 'N' Nasty ===
- No One Rocks Like You (2007; produced by Snowy Shaw)

=== With Therion ===
- Gothic Kabbalah (2007)
- Live Gothic (2008)
- Sitra Ahra (2010)
- Les Fleurs du Mal (2012)
- Live in Atlanta Adulruna Rediviva and Beyond (2007)

=== With Dimmu Borgir ===
- Abrahadabra (2010)

=== With XXX (pronounced Triple X) ===
Currently Snowy Shaw works with the band XXX making glitter rock. Their debut album, Heaven, Hell or Hollywood, was recorded, mixed and mastered by Andy La Rocque in the Sonic Train Studios. They have been signed by King Records/Japan.

=== With Theatres des Vampires ===
- Moonlight Waltz (2011)

=== With Snowy Shaw ===
- Snowy Shaw is Alive! (2011)
- The Liveshow: 25 Years of Madness in the Name of Metal (2014)
- Live in Hell! (2015)
- White Is the New Black (2018)
- Be Kind to Animals or I'll Kill You (2018)

=== With Opera Diabolicus ===
- †1614 (2012)
- Death on a Pale Horse (2021)

=== With Mad Architect ===
- Journey to Madness (2013)
- Hang High (2015)

=== With Dark Embrace ===
- The call of the wolves (2017)
- Dark Heavy Metal (2023)

=== With Barndoom med Snömannen & Hans Vänner ===
- Self-titled (2017)
- Kråksång & Rävspel (2017)

=== With Poison Pill ===
- Poison Pill (2017)
