= To the Grave (album) =

Studio album by Iron Fire
- Released: 9 January 2009
- Genre: Heavy metal, power metal
- Length: 55:36
- Label: Napalm
- Producer: Tommy Hansen

Iron Fire chronology
| Blade of Triumph (2007) | To the Grave (2009) | Metalmorphosized (2010) |

Professional ratings
Review scores
| Source | Rating |
|---|---|
| Blabbermouth.net | 5.5/10 stars |

To the Grave is the fifth studio album of the Danish heavy metal band Iron Fire. It was released through Napalm Records on 9 January 2009.

== Track listing ==
1. "The Beast from the Blackness" - 4:50
2. "Kill for Metal" - 4:11
3. "The Demon Master" - 4:00
4. "Cover the Sun" - 4:54
5. "To the Grave" - 3:39
6. "March of the Immortals" - 4:03
7. "The Kingdom" - 4:24
8. "Frozen in Time" - 5:26
9. "Hail to Odin" - 4:59
10. "Doom Riders" - 5:41
11. "Ghost of Vengeance" - 4:26
12. "The Battlefield" - 5:09

Tracks 1,2,5,6,7,9 & 11 written by: Martin Steene
Tracks 3,4,8,10 & 12 written by: Martin Steene & Kirk Backarach

== Album line-up ==
- Martin Steene – lead & backing vocals
- Kirk Backarach – guitars & backing vocals
- Martin Lund – bass & backing vocals
- Fritz Wagner – drums & backing vocals

Guest musicians

- Danny Svendsen – keyboards & backing vocals
- Ivan Grosmeyer – backing vocals
- Dion Wind – backing vocals
- Dennis Munkebæk – backing vocals
- Jesper Brogaard – backing vocals
- Gunnar Olsen – backing vocals
- Kristian Iversen – backing vocals
- Morten Bryld – backing vocals
- Turtle – backing vocals
