= Iron Fire =

Danish heavy metal band

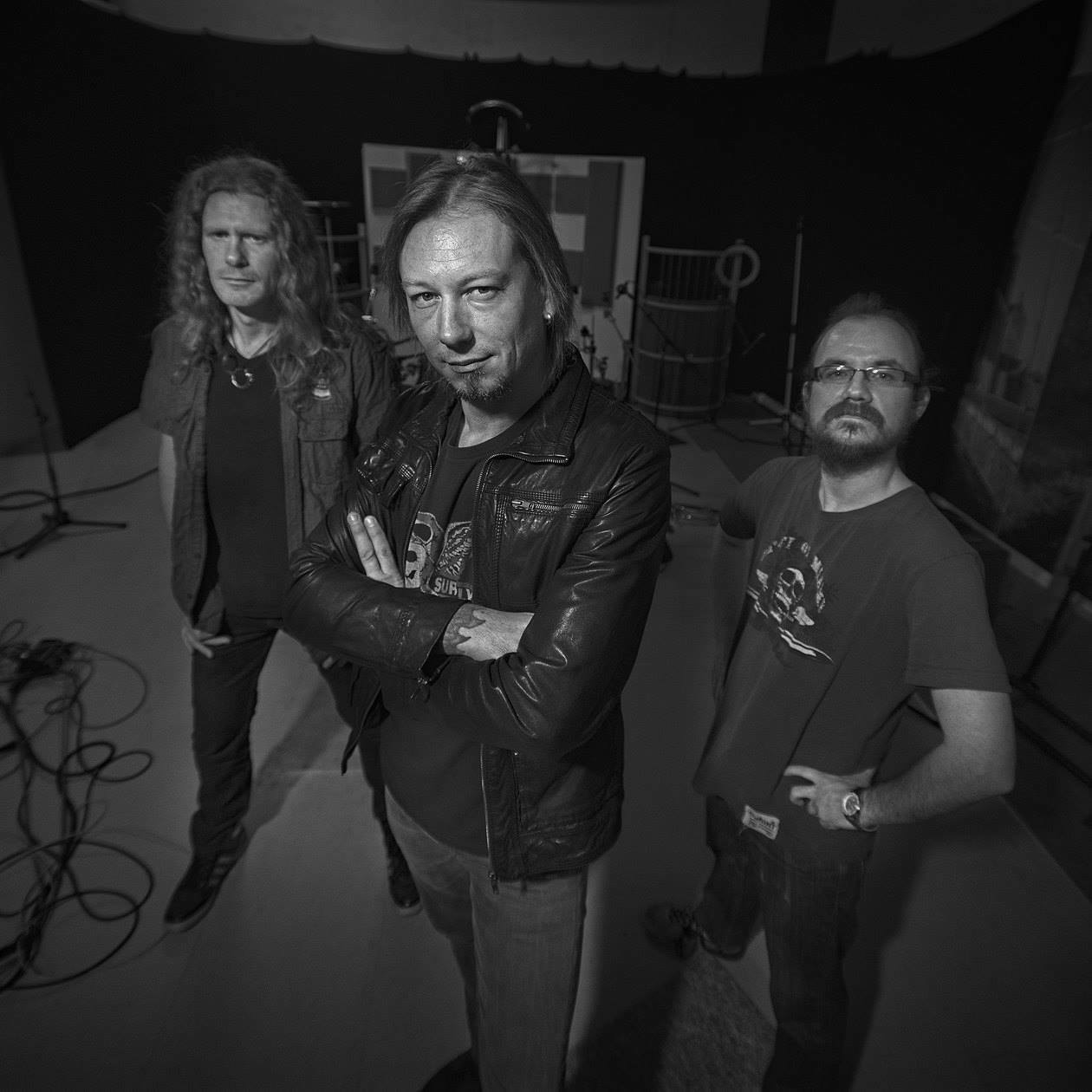

Background information
- Also known as: Misery; Decades of Darkness
- Origin: Denmark
- Genres: Power metal, heavy metal
- Years active: Since 1995
- Labels: Napalm, Noise
- Members: Martin Steene; Kirk Backarach; Gunnar Olsen

Iron Fire is a Danish power metal band that was formed in 1995 under the name Misery. The name was soon changed to Decades of Darkness and finally to Iron Fire. They have released nine albums with their debut Thunderstorm coming out in 2000.

== History ==
After releasing a demo in the late 1990s Iron Fire experienced a small breakthrough in 2000 when their debut album Thunderstorm was released on Noise Records. At the time power metal was in vogue in Europe with bands like HammerFall, Freedom Call, Nocturnal Rites, and Sonata Arctica all coming through. Iron Fire was a typical example of the style with their fast, melodic metal tunes paired with an imagery dominated by fire, swords, warriors, and dragons. Thunderstorm was produced by the Danish producer Tommy Hansen, who was known for the sound on the Helloween albums Keeper of the 7 Keys parts I and II.

After the release of Thunderstorm, the band experienced some line-up changes with drummer Gunnar Olsen being replaced by Morten Plenge and guitarist Kristian Iversen by Martin Slott. They fell out with the label as their second album, On the Edge, did not prove as successful as their debut. The band, led by Steene, experienced with different sound, which was slightly more progressive with more emphasis on ballads. They did not want to repeat themselves, but ended up getting no support from the label. After this the band more or less fell apart and Steene had to rebuild a new line-up. This led to a break in album activities and a search for a new label. During that period the band produced two demos, while Steene was also working with Force of Evil formed by the two Mercyful Fate guitarists Michael Denner and Hank Shermann.

In March 2006, Iron Fire fought their way back when they released the album, Revenge, under the Napalm Records label. Steene now had Kirk Backarach, who was to become a mainstay, with him on the guitar. Johan Jacob H. Olsen played the other guitar, Jens Berglid the drums, and Martin Lund the bass. Revenge saw a return towards pure metal with less experimentation, and the band began to establish themselves again. Their music was now marked by heavy riffage as a foundation for Steene's high pitched, and slightly sleaze inspired, vocals and catchy melodies. The band adopted a Viking theme in their artwork and in some of their lyrics.

Revenge was followed by Blade of Triumph in 2007. After this effort drummer Jens Berglid left the band listing family issues as the reason. The band had time to find a replacement in Fritz Wagner before embarking on a Germany Tour of Triumph in 2007 with U.D.O and Primal Fear. At this time Martin Steene was also working with former bandmates Gunnar Olsen and Martin Slott as well as Iron Fire bass player Martin Lund on their goth rock project Nightlight. Their album, Funeral of Love, was released in the winter 2009.

Steene and Lund were busy as also Iron Fire's fifth album To the Grave was released in the winter 2009. With Johan Jacob H. Olsen out of the band Kirk Backarach was now handling the guitars alone on the album, while different guitarists filled in live. To the Grave marked the end of what can be seen as the band's Viking warrior trilogy.

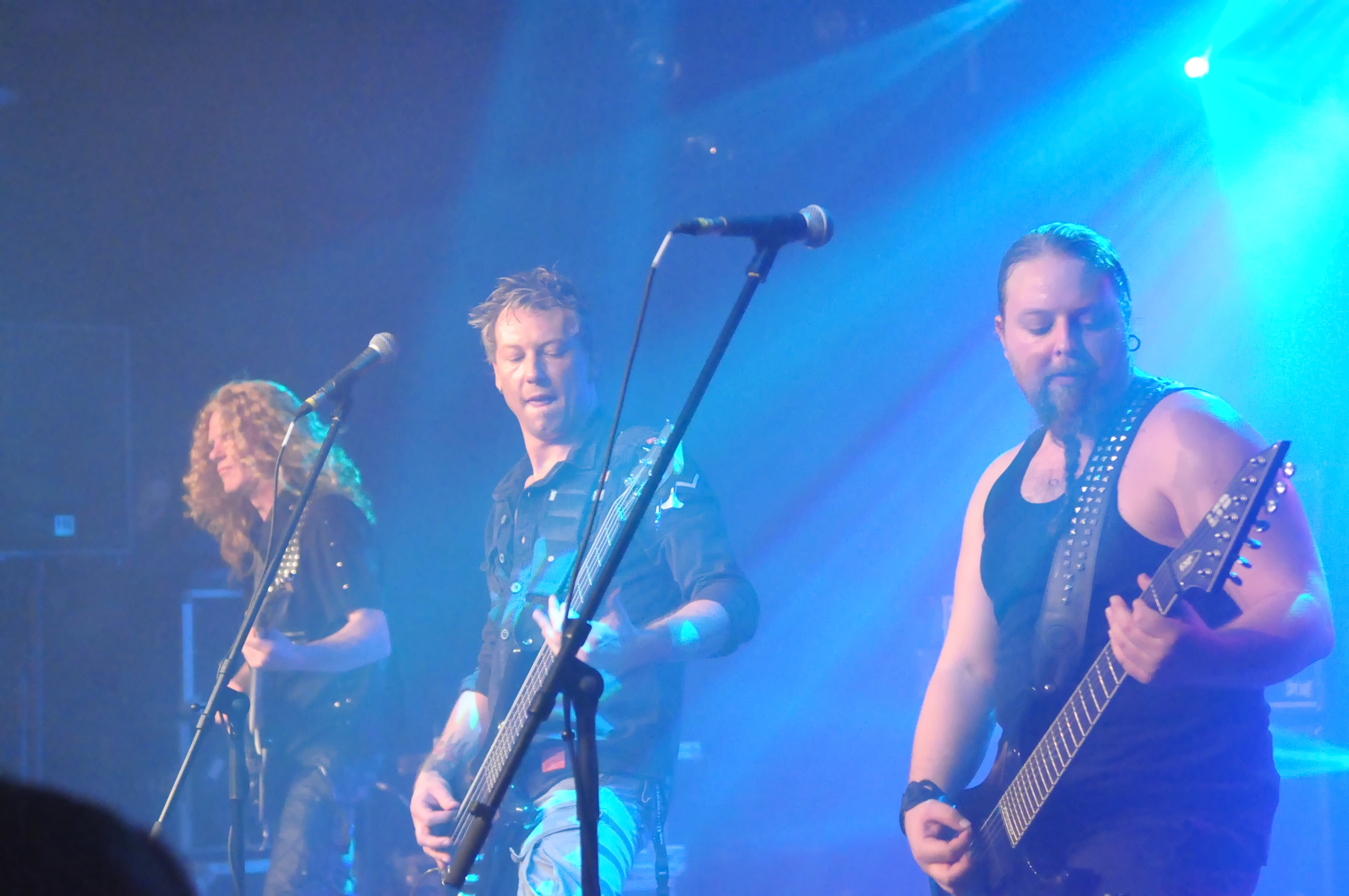
Iron Fire performing in 2014

After an album, Metalmorphosized, released in 2010, which contained reworked versions of left-over material from then bands' first decade, they released the album Voyage of the Damned in 2012. It marked a turn towards sci-fi themed lyrics and artwork while also containing more keyboards (Rune Stiassny of the Danish doom metal band Saturnus), without losing the heaviness. A video clip was shot for the single Leviathan. In this video session guitarist Rune Stiassny can also be seen. He has since been a stable live musician for the band.

Voyage of the Damned would be the last full album to feature drummer Fritz Wagner and bassist Martin Lund. They both, however, played on the 2014 single A Token of My Hatred (a Virgin Steele cover), released on Crime Records.

2016 saw Iron Fire return to a more stripped-down sound with the album Among the Dead where the band explored the zombie genre, the music still carried by heavy riffs paired with Steene's melodic vocals. Also former drummer Gunnar Olsen returned after being out of the band for 16 years. Olsen did, however, play in Steene's goth rock project Nightlight. After the release of Among the Dead the band played shows all over Denmark and a few in Norway, while already starting recordings for the next album.

== Band members ==
- Martin Steene – vocals (since 1995), bass (since 2013)
- Kirk Backarach – guitars (since 2003)
- Gunnar Olsen – drums (1998–2000, since 2016)

Former members

- Kristian "Iver" Iversen (Forcentury) – guitars (1995–2000)
- Kristian H. Martinsen – guitars, percussion (1998–2001)
- Martin Slott (Nightlight)– guitars (1998–2002)
- Søren Jensen – guitars (2002–2003)
- Jeff Lukka – guitars (2003)
- Johan Jacob (J.J.) H. Olsen – guitars (2006–2008)
- Thomas Mogensen – drums
- Morten Plenge – drums (2000–2001)
- Steve Mason (Forcentury) – drums (2001–2003)
- Jens Berglid – drums (2006–2007)
- Tony Olsen – drums
- Martin Sunddal – drums
- Fritz Wagner – drums (2007–2013)
- Jakob Lykkebo – bass (1998–2001)
- Jose Cruz – bass (2002–2003)
- Martin Lund – bass (2004–2013)

Live musicians

- Christian Martinsen – bass
- Rune Stiassny (Saturnus) – guitar
- Martin Slott – guitar
- Marc Masters (Forcentury)– guitars (2008–2009)

== Discography ==
=== Studio albums ===
- Thunderstorm (2000)
- On The Edge (2001)
- Revenge (2006)
- Blade of Triumph (2007)
- To the Grave (2009)
- Metalmorphosized (2010)
- Voyage of the Damned (2012)
- Among the Dead (2016)
- Beyond the Void (2019)

=== Other releases ===
- Demo (1998)
- Spaced Out (2003)
- The Underworld [Demo] (2003)
- A Token of my Hatred (Virgin Steele cover) [single] (2014)
- Dawn of Creation: Twentieth Anniversary [Compilation] (2018)
