= Children of the Night (EP) =

EP by Dream Evil
- Released: October 3, 2003
- Genre: Heavy metal, power metal
- Length: 19:21
- Label: Century Media
- Producer: Fredrik Nordström and Dream Evil

Dream Evil chronology
Evilized (2003)	Children of the Night (2003)	The Book of Heavy Metal (2004)

Professional ratings
Review scores
Source	Rating
Noise.fi	4/5 stars
Rock Hard	
Metal.de	
Powermetal.de	
Vampster	

Children of the Night is an EP released by the heavy metal band Dream Evil. The Japanese version is different from other editions.

== Track listing ==
1. Children of the Night - 4:19 (Edited Version)
2. Dragonheart - 3:31
3. Betrayed - 4:00
4. Evilized - 4:54 (Unplugged Version)

== Japan Track listing ==
1. Children of the Night (Edited Version)
2. Take the World
3. The Prophecy (demo)
4. Heavy Metal in the Night (demo)
5. Evilized (Acoustic Version)

This version also includes the Children of the Night video clip.
