= Pagan's Mind =

Norwegian band

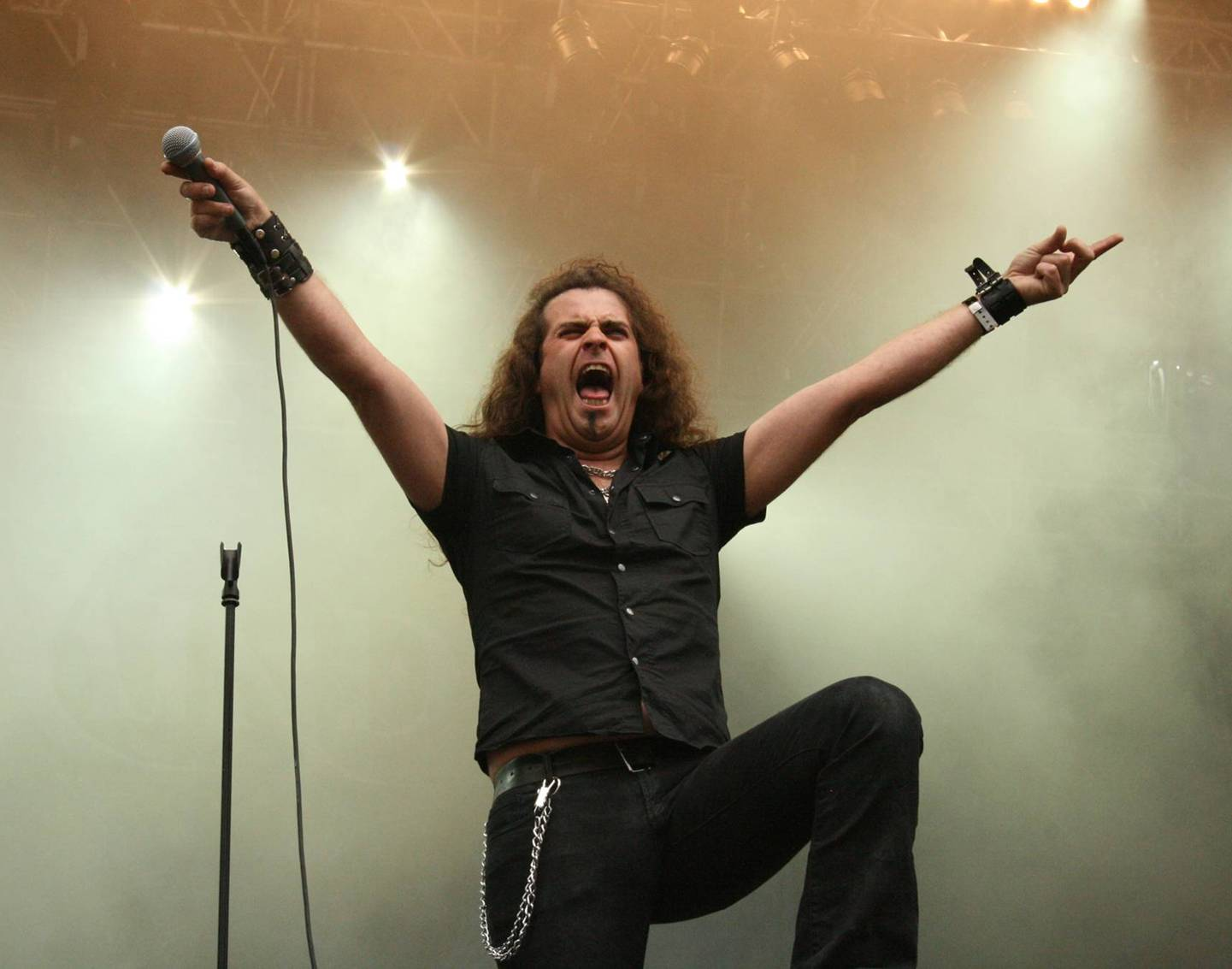
- Nils K. Rue at a 2008 Pagan's Mind performance at the Norway Rock Festival

Background information
- Also known as: Silverspoon (2000)
- Origin: Skien, Norway
- Genres: Progressive metal, power metal
- Years active: 2000–2014, 2017–present
- Labels: Limb Music, SPV/Steamhammer
- Members: Nils K. Rue; Jørn Viggo Lofstad; Steinar Krokmo; Stian Kristoffersen; Ronny Tegner
- Past members: Thorstein Aaby
- Website: www.pagansmind.com

Pagan's Mind is a progressive metal band from Skien, Norway. They have released five studio albums, and the current line-up features only original members.

== Biography ==
Founded in 2000 from the band Silverspoon by Nils K. Rue, Thorstein Aaby, and Stian Kristoffersen. Pagan's Mind released their first album, Infinity Divine, that same year. The following album, Celestial Entrance, was released in 2002 and was a relatively big success even outside of Norway. A re-recorded version of Infinity Divine was released in 2004. Their third album, Enigmatic: Calling, was released in 2005 and debuted at number 15 on the Norwegian albums chart.

In February 2008, power metal band Power Quest announced that Pagan's Mind guitarist Jørn Viggo Lofstad will be providing guest instrumentation for the upcoming album Master of Illusion.

In 2008, Pagan's Mind toured with Sonata Arctica on their Unia tour.

In 2009, Pagan's Mind played ProgPower USA.

On 2 March 2011, Pagan's Mind announced Heavenly Ecstasy as the title of their forthcoming album. The band also released a new song called "Intermission" as a premiere for the online radio show "The Metal Madman". The album was released on SPV/Steamhammer on 20 May in Germany, 23 May in other parts of Europe and in June in USA/Canada.

On 11 August 2014 Pagan's Mind launched a crowdfunding campaign to fund their next live release called Full Circle - Live At Center Stage, which ran till 20 September and was successfully funded by 163% through their Indiegogo campaign. On 31 July the release date of Full Circle - Live At Center Stage was announced to be on 16 October 2015 in a Blu-ray+2CD, DVD+2CD and 2LP+CD format through SPV Steamhammer GmbH.

Between 2014 and 2017, the band was inactive due to health issues from the members of the bands. They resumed their activities in late 2017, and started working on a new album. On 22 January they announced that due to a family situation, K. Rue would not be featured on the three shows planned in March, and would be replaced by Ole Aleksander Wagenius from the band Withem; the band stated that K. Rue's situation would not interfere with his involvement in the upcoming album.

On 17 June 2020 Lofstad appeared as a guest on the podcast "The Genghis & Ragman Show", where he revealed that there were some internal strife within the band that they were working through. He also stated that the band had made enough material to create a new album, and that he hopes to be able to release that one final album with the band. In July 29th 2021, K. Rue appeared on the Youtube show "Breaking Absolutes", where he talked about the upcoming album. During the interview he stated that the songwriting will move away from the topics commonly associated with the band. He also noted that despite band members moving away from each other, they had found a way to be able to work together, and also assured fans that the new album is coming. Nils K. Rue reiterated that sentiment in another interview on August 9th 2023 with Norway Rock Magazine.

== Side-projects by band members ==
Nils K. Rue was the vocalist for Canadian power metal Band Eidolon for their final album as well as a single before the band disbanded.

On 28 November 2016 it was announced that Nils K. Rue would play a character named The Prophet in the next Ayreon album The Source.

On 22 February 2018 Northward, a hard rock project by Jørn Viggo Lofstad and singer Floor Jansen, was unveiled. The two created the project in 2007, writing an entire album worth of music in 2008 but being unable to record previously due to their busy schedules; they ultimately reunited in 2017 to finally record their self-titled debut album, which was released in 2018.

== Influences ==
Their music is influenced by Stargate, especially the theatrical film. In an interview, frontman Nils K. Rue said: "I wouldn't say I like the TV series Stargate, because I never saw an entire episode of that. But I really like the film Stargate. Of course, I took some inspiration from that..."

== Band members ==
- Nils K. Rue – lead vocals (2000–present)
- Jørn Viggo Lofstad – guitar, backing vocals (2000–present)
- Steinar Krokmo – bass, backing vocals (2000–present)
- Ronny Tegner – keyboards (2000–present)
- Stian Kristoffersen – drums (2000–present)

=== Former members ===
- Thorstein Aaby – guitar (2000–2003; died 2007)

=== Live member ===
- Ole Aleksander Wagenius – vocals (2018)

== Discography ==
=== Studio albums ===
- Infinity Divine (2000)
- Celestial Entrance (2002)
- Enigmatic: Calling (2005)
- God's Equation (2007)
- Heavenly Ecstasy (2011)

=== Live albums ===
- Live Equation (2009)
- Full Circle: Live at Center Stage (2015)

== Videography ==
=== DVD and video ===
- New World Order Live and Supremacy Our Kind Live (ProgPower USA VIII Concert DVD)
- God Equation Live 2009 (Promo/Concert Sale DVD)

=== Music videos ===
- "Through Osiris' Eyes" (Celestial Entrance)
- "Aegean Shores" (Celestial Entrance)
- "Enigmatic Mission" (Enigmatic: Calling)
- "Atomic Firelight" (God's Equation)
- "Intermission" (Heavenly Ecstasy)
