= Memento Mori (band) =

Swedish metal band

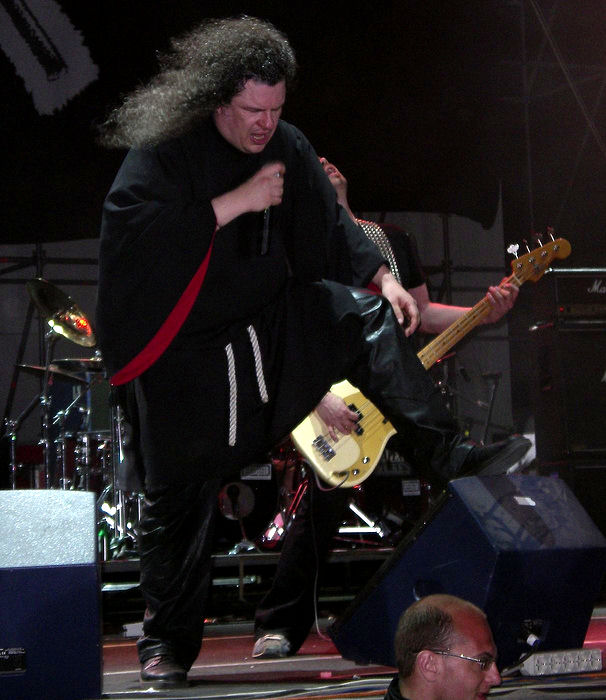
- Vocalist Messiah Marcolin

Background information
- Origin: Stockholm, Sweden
- Genres: Epic doom metal
- Years active: 1992–1997
- Label: Black Mark

Memento Mori was a Swedish band that is mainly doom metal but has some power metal influences. The band was founded by Messiah Marcolin, Snowy Shaw and Mike Wead in 1992 after Messiah left Candlemass and Wead took a break from his other band Hexenhaus. After two albums Messiah left the band because he was not credited as a songwriter; Snowy Shaw also quit the band to work with the reunited Mercyful Fate. The third album was sung by Kristian Andrén who used to sing for Swedish power doom metal band Tad Morose. Messiah returned for the fourth album, Songs for the Apocalypse Vol IV, without Snowy Shaw. Drum duties were taken over by fellow Swede and Memory Garden drummer Tom Bjorn. After that album, the band broke up. All albums were released by Black Mark.

== Former members ==
- Messiah Marcolin – vocals
- Mike Wead – guitars
- Nikkey Argento – guitars
- Marty Marteen – bass
- Tom Bjorn – drums
- Kristian Andrén – vocals
- Miguel Robaina – keyboards
- Snowy Shaw – drums
- Johan Billerhag (a.k.a. "Billy St. John") – drums

== Discography ==
- Rhymes of Lunacy (1993)
- Life, Death, and Other Morbid Tales (1994)
- La Danse Macabre (1996)
- Songs for the Apocalypse, Vol. 4 (1997)
