= Gold Medal in Metal =

Gold Medal In Metal (Alive and Archive)

Live album by Dream Evil
- Released: 25 August 2008
- Genre: Power metal, heavy metal
- Label: Century Media
- Director: Patric Ullaeus
- Producer: Fredrik Nordström

Dream Evil chronology
United (2006)	Gold Medal In Metal (Alive and Archive) (2008)	In the Night (2010)

Gold Medal in Metal (Alive & Archive) is the first live DVD/CD released by Swedish heavy metal band Dream Evil. It includes a DVD featuring the band playing live at the Sticky Fingers in their hometown of Gothenburg on 25 November 2006, directed and produced by Patric Ullaeus. The audio includes an additional disc of rare tracks, some previously unreleased and some only available on Japanese albums, as well as three new studio tracks recorded in 2007.

This collection was released on 25 August 2008 via Century Media Records.

== Track listing ==
Gold Medal disc (100:45)

I. Live Maerd (Live Show)

No.	Title	Length
1.	"United"
2.	"Blind Evil"
3.	"Fire! Battle! In Metal!"
4.	"In Flames You Burn"
5.	"Crusaders' Anthem"
6.	"Back from the Dead"
7.	"Higher on Fire"
8.	"The Prophecy"
9.	"Made of Metal"
10.	"Heavy Metal in the Night"
11.	"Let Me Out"
12.	"The Chosen Ones"
13.	"The Book of Heavy Metal"
14.	"Chasing the Dragon"
15.	"Children of the Night"

II. Video Clips

1. Fire! Battle! In Metal!
2. Blind Evil
3. The Book of Heavy Metal
4. Children of the Night

III. Interview

1. The band's beginning and the inspirations...
2. The "album by album commentary"
3. Why is there a difference between Dream Evil and other bands?
4. The new line-up...
5. The section where you can ask each other questions for all viewers
6. The next goals for Dream Evil
7. The famous last words...
8. The encore...

Silver Medal disc - Alive (67:00)

CD Disc 1 (Audio live-album with same track listing as "Live Maerd" DVD section)

1. United
2. Blind Evil
3. Fire! Battle! In Metal!
4. In Flames You Burn
5. Crusaders' Anthem
6. Back from the Dead
7. Higher on Fire
8. The Prophecy
9. Made of Metal
10. Heavy Metal in the Night
11. Let Me Out
12. The Chosen Ones
13. The Book of Heavy Metal
14. Chasing the Dragon
15. Children of the Night

Bronze Medal disc - Archive (60:53)

CD Disc 2

1. Dominator - 3:23
2. Fight for Metal - 3:52
3. December 25th - 4:17
4. Pain Patrol - 3:15
5. Lady of Pleasure - 3:27
6. Chapter 6 - 4:03
7. Gold Medal in Metal - 3:12
8. Point of No Return - 3:52
9. The Enemy - 3:15
10. Hero of Zeroes - 4:30
11. Bringing the Metal Back - 3:43
12. Betrayed - 4:02
13. Evilized [unplugged] - 4:56
14. Dragonheart - 3:36
15. Take the World - 4:09
16. Crusader's Anthem [demo] - 4:03
17. Touring Is My Life [live] - 1:58
