= Revenge (Iron Fire album) =

Studio album by Iron Fire
- Released: March 31, 2006
- Genre: Heavy metal, power metal
- Length: 55:25
- Label: Napalm Records
- Producer: Tommy Hansen

Iron Fire chronology
On the Edge (2001)	Revenge (2006)	Blade of Triumph (2007)

Revenge is the "comeback" album from the band Iron Fire, released March 31, 2006. The album followed a struggle to get a record deal and maintain a stable line-up.

== Track listing ==
1. "Wings of Rage" - 4:24
2. "Iron Head" - 4:25
3. "Metal Messiah" - 4:54
4. "Whirlwind of Doom" - 4:51
5. "Savage Prophecy" - 5:28
6. "Fate of Fire" - 4:26
7. "Stand as King" - 4:49
8. "Brotherhood of the Brave" - 4:40
9. "Alone in the Dark" - 4:26
10. "Mindmachine" - 3:55
11. "Ice-cold Arion" - 4:20
12. "Break the Spell" - 4:40

All songs written by: Martin Steene

== Album line-up ==
- Martin Steene - Vocals (Acoustic Guitar on "Icecold Arion")
- Kirk Backarach - Guitars
- J.J. - Guitars
- Martin Lund - Bass
- Jens B. - Drums

Guest Musicians

- Tommy Hansen - Keyboards on all tracks except track # 11
- Casper Jensen - Keyboards on track # 11
