= God's Equation =

Studio album by Pagan's Mind
- Released: 9 November 2007
- Recorded: 2007
- Studios: Mediamaker Studio, Skien, Norway
- Genres: Heavy metal, progressive metal, power metal
- Length: 60:08
- Label: Limb
- Producer: Espen Mjøen

Pagan's Mind chronology
Enigmatic: Calling (2005)	God's Equation (2007)	Heavenly Ecstasy (2011)

Professional ratings
Review scores
Source	Rating
Heavymetal.dk	9/10
Metal Express Radio	8.5/10
Metal Storm	9.2/10
Rock Hard	8/10

God's Equation is the fourth album by the Norwegian progressive metal band Pagan's Mind. It was released on 9 November 2007 in Europe and on 15 January 2008 in the United States. The 2-disc limited edition version of the album contains a poster, including six bonus tracks, a video clip and wallpapers in a paperboard slipcase.

== Track listing ==
No.	Title	Length
1.	"The Conception"	2:03
2.	"God's Equation"	7:57
3.	"United Alliance"	5:04
4.	"Atomic Firelight"	5:19
5.	"Hallo Spaceboy" (David Bowie cover)	5:30
6.	"Evolution Exceed"	6:08
7.	"Alien Kamikaze"	4:37
8.	"Painted Skies"	6:33
9.	"Spirit Starcruiser"	6:02
10.	"Farewell"	2:10
11.	"Osiris' Triumphant Return"	8:45
12.	"Shine Eternally" (Bonus Track)	7:42

== Credits ==
=== Band members ===
- Nils K. Rue − vocals
- Jørn Viggo Lofstad − guitars
- Steinar Krokmo − bass
- Stian Kristoffersen − drums
- Ronny Tegner − keyboards

=== Other ===
- "God's Equation" was mixed by Stefan Glaumann (of Rammstein) in Toytown Studios, Sweden.
