= Faceshift =

Swedish band

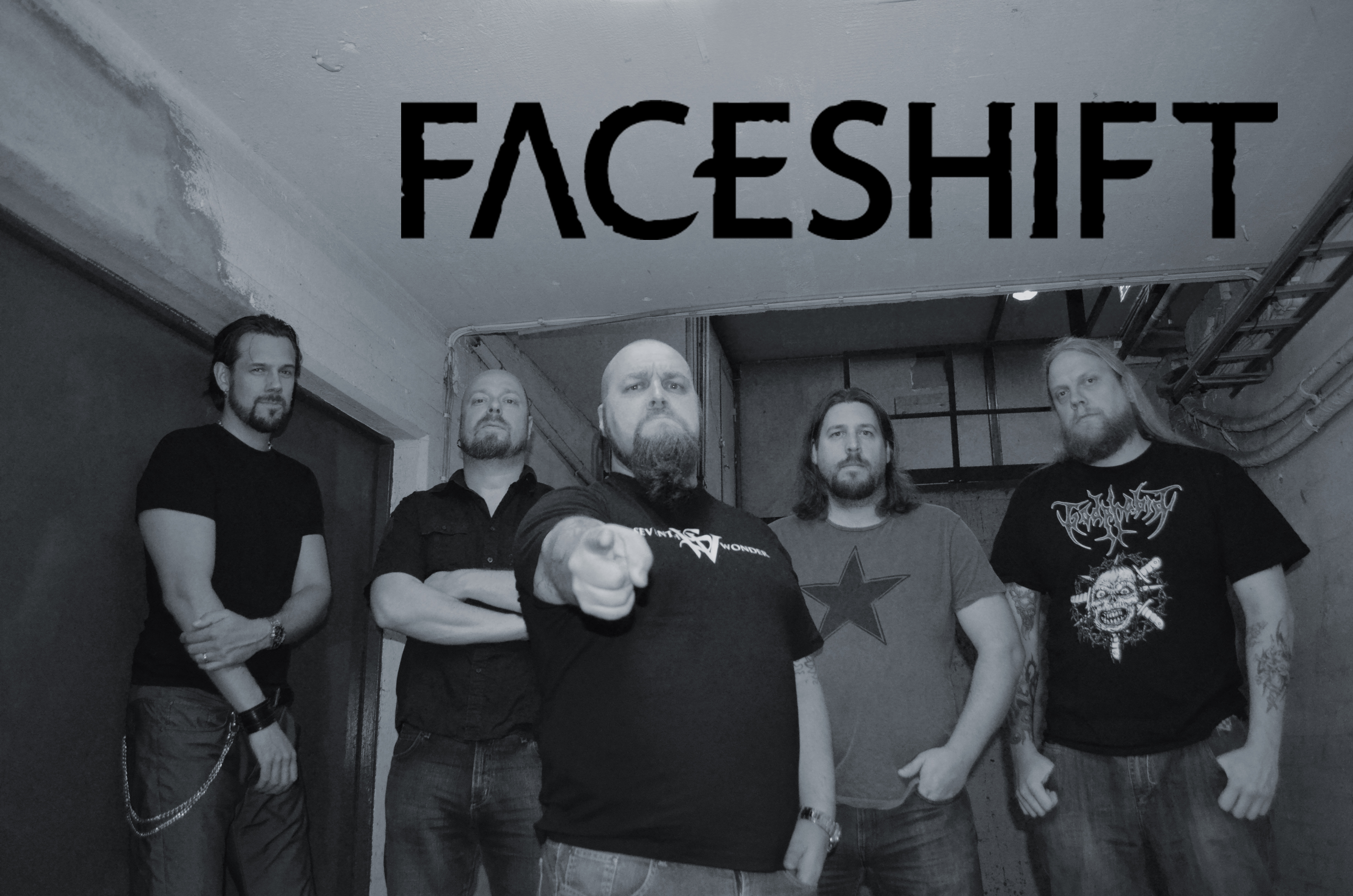

Background information
- Origin: Stockholm, Sweden
- Genres: Heavy metal Grunge; Progressive metal
- Years active: 2005-
- Label: Mighty Music
- Members: Timo Hovinen; Stefan Norgren; Petri Tarvainen; Mika Kajanen; David Bertilsson
- Past members: Peter Nagy; Peter Wendin

Faceshift is a metal band, formed in 2005 in Stockholm, Sweden.

== History ==
Faceshift, from Stockholm, Sweden is a band that, while firmly rooted in classic heavy metal from the 80's and 90's, incorporates elements of grunge, prog, death and blues to create their own blend of music. The band's second album, the critically acclaimed All Crumbles Down, embodies the diversity of all the members' musical origins, ranging from drummer Stefan Norgren's prog metal roots from Seventh Wonder, via singer Timo Hovinen's grunge-esque vocals, through the death landscapes mastered by bassist Mika Kajanen and Petri Tarvainen, to lead guitarist David Bertilsson's bluesy touch.

== Discography ==
=== Albums ===
- 2015 All Crumbles Down (Mighty Music)

Track list:

1. Betrayed
2. The Lie
3. Pieces
4. A New Beginning
5. Someone to Be
6. Of Dignity and Shame
7. Awaken
8. Painted Life
9. Stand Alone
10. On the Inside
11. When All Crumbles Down
- 2007: Reconcile (Black Lodge Records)

Track list:

1. Reality/Fatality (3:54)
2. My Own Demise (4:20)
3. Self Appointed Victim (3:41)
4. No Cure Sickness (3:35)
5. Live the Lie (5:17)
6. The Dark Domain (4:26)
7. Chokehold (4:11)
8. Reconcile (4:03)
9. Greater Than I (3:42)
10. The Craving (4:09)
11. Bound (3:18)
12. Conclusion (4:51)

=== Singles ===
- 2012: "A New Beginning"

Track list:

1. New Beginning (04.17)
2. Awaken (04.39)
- 2007: "Chokehold" (Black Lodge Records)

== Members ==
From Faceshift's official Facebook page.

- Timo Hovinen – Lead Vocals
- Stefan Norgren – Drums, Backing Vocals
- David Bertilsson – Lead Guitar
- Petri Tarvainen – Rhythm Guitar
- Helene Norgren – Bass Guitar

=== Past members ===
- Peter Nagy-Eklöf – Guitar (2005–2008)
- Peter Wendin – Bass Guitar (2005-2008)
- Mika Kajanen - Bass Guitar (2008 - 2016)
