= Heavenly Ecstasy =

Studio album by Pagan's Mind
- Released: 20 May 2011
- Recorded: 2009–2010
- Genre: Progressive metal, power metal
- Length: 55:56
- Label: Steamhammer

Pagan's Mind chronology
God's Equation (2007)	Heavenly Ecstasy (2011)

Professional ratings
Review scores
Source	Rating
AllMusic	3.5/5 stars
Hardrock Haven	8.8/10
Metal.de	8/10

Heavenly Ecstasy is the fifth studio album by the Norwegian progressive metal band Pagan's Mind. It was released on 20 May 2011 in Germany, 23 May 2011 in the rest of Europe, and 31 May 2011 in the USA and Canada. It is the first album the band released with label Steamhammer Records. The album was released in several formats: as a digipak with two bonus tracks, 28-page booklet, and poster; a double gatefold LP with two bonus tracks on orange-colored vinyl; as a standard jewel case; and as a digital download. A music video was released for the song "Intermission".

== Track listing ==
No.	Title	Length
1.	"Contact"	0:48
2.	"Eyes of Fire"	5:48
3.	"Intermission"	5:41
4.	"Into the Aftermath"	5:18
5.	"Walk Away in Silence"	5:08
6.	"Revelation to the End"	8:32
7.	"Follow Your Way"	5:18
8.	"Live Your Life Like a Dream"	5:55
9.	"The Master's Voice"	5:16
10.	"Never Walk Alone"	6:09
11.	"When Angels Unite"	2:03
Total length:		55:56

Bonus tracks
No.	Title	Length
12.	"Create Your Destiny"	5:49
13.	"Power of Mindscape"	4:16

== Personnel ==
=== Pagan's Mind ===
- Nils K. Rue – lead vocals
- Jørn Viggo Lofstad – guitar
- Steinar Krokmo – bass
- Stian Lindaas Kristoffersen – drums
- Ronny Tegner – keyboards
