= Fredrik Nordström =

Swedish record producer (born 1967)

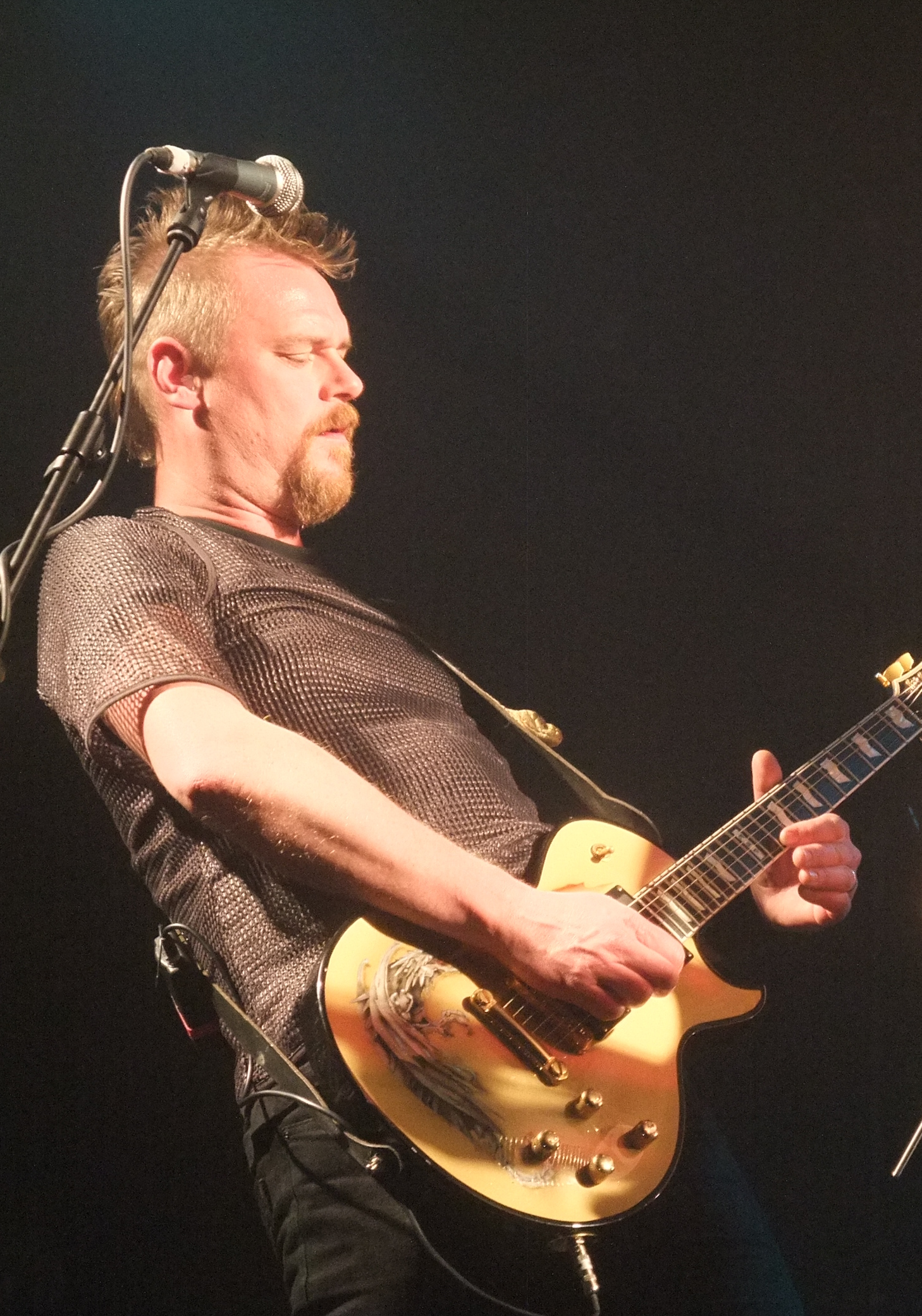
- Nordström performing in 2010

Background information
- Born: Björn Tom Fredrik Nordström; 5 January 1967 (age 59); Sweden
- Genres: Heavy metal; power metal; melodic death metal
- Occupations: Record producer; audio engineer; musician
- Instruments: Guitar; keyboards
- Years active: 1992–present
- Member of: Dream Evil
- Website: studiofredman.com

Björn Tom Fredrik Nordström (born 5 January 1967) is a Swedish record producer and musician, and the guitarist of the heavy metal band Dream Evil. He is one of the leading melodic death metal and power metal producers in Sweden and has worked with some of said genres' top acts, including At the Gates, Arch Enemy, Nightrage, Dark Tranquillity, In Flames, Soilwork, Opeth, and Powerwolf.

Fascinated by technology from a young age, Nordström opened a small recording studio in Gothenburg, mainly to record his own music. The studio evolved into Studio Fredman, one of the leading Swedish recording studios where he works with his employee Henrik Udd.

In 1999, Nordström formed the heavy metal band Dream Evil to perform his own music, and as of 2024, Dream Evil has released six albums, one live DVD/CD set, and two EPs. Today, Nordström is considered one of the top metal producers in Europe, and one of the central figures of the Gothenburg style.

== Discography with Dream Evil ==
- Dragonslayer (2002)
- Evilized (2003)
- Children of the Night (EP, 2003)
- The First Chapter (EP, 2004)
- The Book of Heavy Metal (2004)
- United (2006)
- Gold Medal in Metal (Alive & Archive) (2008)
- In the Night (2010)
- Six (2017)

== Production credits ==
=== 1990 ===
- Calcutta Cornflakes (demo)

=== 1993 ===
- Ceremonial Oath – The Book of Truth

=== 1994 ===
- At the Gates – Terminal Spirit Disease
- In Flames – Lunar Strain (mixing, engineering)
- In Flames – Subterranean (EP) (engineering)

=== 1995 ===
- At the Gates – Slaughter of the Soul
- Dark Tranquillity – Of Chaos and Eternal Night (EP)
- Dark Tranquillity – The Gallery
- Memory Garden – Forever (EP)

=== 1996 ===
- Arch Enemy – Black Earth
- Dark Tranquillity – Enter Suicidal Angels (EP)
- In Flames – The Jester Race
- LOK – Ord och inga visor
- Memory Garden – Tides
- Sacrilege – Lost in the Beauty You Slay
- Sludge Nation – Wisehead
- Sludge Nation – Blow Your Speakers with Sludge Nation

=== 1997 ===
- Armageddon – Crossing the Rubicon
- Dark Tranquillity – The Mind's I
- Dimension Zero – Penetrations from the Lost World
- HammerFall – Glory to the Brave
- In Flames – Black-Ash Inheritance (EP)
- In Flames – Whoracle
- Lord Belial – Enter the Moonlight Gate
- Misanthrope – Visionnaire
- Sacrilege – The Fifth Season
- Skitsystem – Levande Lik

=== 1998 ===
- Arch Enemy – Stigmata
- Exhumation – Dance Across the Past
- HammerFall – Legacy of Kings
- The Haunted – The Haunted
- Misanthrope – Libertine Humiliations
- Opeth – My Arms, Your Hearse
- Embraced – Amorous Anathema
- Runemagick – The Supreme Force of Eternity
- Soilwork – Steelbath Suicide
- Spiritual Beggars – Mantra III

=== 1999 ===
- Arch Enemy – Burning Bridges
- Dark Tranquillity – Projector
- Exhumation – Traumaticon
- In Flames – Colony
- Malevolence – Martyrialized
- Opeth – Still Life
- Septicflesh – Revolution DNA
- Sinergy – Beware the Heavens

=== 2000 ===
- Arch Enemy – Burning Japan Live 1999
- Buried Dreams – Perceptions
- The Crown – Deathrace King
- Dark Tranquillity – Haven
- In Flames – Clayman
- Sludge – Scarecrow Messiah
- Soilwork – The Chainheart Machine
- Spiritual Beggars – Ad Astra

=== 2001 ===
- Arch Enemy – Wages of Sin
- Dimmu Borgir – Puritanical Euphoric Misanthropia
- Godgory – Way Beyond
- Opeth – Blackwater Park (mixing)
- Soilwork – A Predator's Portrait

=== 2002 ===
- Arch Enemy – Burning Angel (EP)
- Dark Tranquillity – Damage Done
- Dragonland – Holy War
- Dream Evil – Dragonslayer
- Eternal Oath – Righteous
- Firewind – Between Heaven and Hell
- The Fifth Sun – The Moment of Truth
- Opeth – Deliverance (engineering)
- Sinergy – Suicide by My Side
- Soilwork – Natural Born Chaos

=== 2003 ===
- On Thorns I Lay – Egocentric
- Evergrey – Recreation Day
- Soilwork – Figure Number Five
- Darkest Hour – Hidden Hands of a Sadist Nation
- Dimmu Borgir – Death Cult Armageddon
- Dream Evil – Evilized
- Firewind – Burning Earth
- The Haunted – One Kill Wonder
- Nightrage – Sweet Vengeance
- Old Man's Child – In Defiance of Existence
- Pagan's Mind – Celestial Entrance
- Passenger – Passenger
- Septicflesh – Sumerian Daemons
- Zyklon – Aeon

=== 2004 ===
- Ancient – Night Visit (mixing)
- Dark Tranquillity – Exposures – In Retrospect and Denial
- Dream Evil – The Book of Heavy Metal
- The Fifth Sun – The Hunger to Survive
- The Haunted – Revolver
- Rotting Christ – Sanctus Diavolos (mastering)
- Sludge – Yellow Acid Rain

=== 2005 ===
- Contrive – The Meaning Unseen
- Dark Tranquillity – Character (mixing)
- Dragonlord – Black Wings of Destiny
- Eternal Oath – Wither
- Firewind – Forged by Fire (mixing assistance)
- Nightrage – Descent into Chaos
- Old Man's Child – Vermin
- Pagan's Mind – Enigmatic: Calling
- Powerwolf – Return in Bloodred

=== 2006 ===
- Bleed in Vain – Say Everything Will Be Fine (mixing)
- Dream Evil – United
- Ever Since – Between Heaven and Hell
- Firewind – Allegiance (mixing)
- Dragonland – Astronomy (mixing)
- I Killed the Prom Queen – Music for the Recently Deceased
- Lyzanxia – Unsu
- Machinae Supremacy – Redeemer
- Norther – Till Death Unites Us
- Splitter – En Sorglig Historia
- Wolf – The Black Flame

=== 2007 ===
- All Ends – Wasting Life (EP)
- All Ends – All Ends
- Anthelion – Bloodshed Rebefallen
- Arch Enemy – Rise of the Tyrant
- Dimmu Borgir – In Sorte Diaboli
- Iron Fire – Blade of Triumph
- Powerwolf – Lupus Dei
- Breed – Breed (mixing)

=== 2008 ===
- Bring Me the Horizon – Suicide Season
- Coming Fall – Kill the Lights
- Eclipse Eternal – Ubermensch: Evolution Beyond the Species
- Evergrey – Torn
- Firewind – The Premonition
- The Hollow Earth Theory – Rise of Agartha
- Norther – N
- Septicflesh – Communion
- Zonaria – The Cancer Empire
- Cripple Bastards – Variante alla Morte
- Arkan – Hilal

=== 2009 ===
- Eyes of Noctum – Inceptum
- Feed Her to the Sharks – The Beauty of Falling (mixing)
- Job for a Cowboy – Ruination (mixing)
- Narnia – Course of a Generation
- Nightrage – Wearing a Martyr's Crown (production/mixing/keyboards)
- Old Man's Child – Slaves of the World
- Outrage – Outrage
- Powerwolf – Bible of the Beast
- Mean Streak – Metal Slave (mixing)
- Wintergrave – Final Termination (EP)

=== 2010 ===
- Bring Me the Horizon – There Is a Hell Believe Me I've Seen It. There Is a Heaven Let's Keep It a Secret.
- Buried in Verona – Saturday Night Sever
- Dream Evil – In the Night
- Dreamshade – What Silence Hides
- Demovore – Beneath Darkened Skies (mixing/mastering/re-amping, other work by Christopher Karlsrud)
- Sabaton – Coat of Arms (mixing)
- Arkan – Salam
- Nightrage – Vengeance Descending (production/mixing/keyboards)

=== 2011 ===
- Akrya – Akrya (mastering)
- Nervosia – Apathy's Throne (EP) (mixing/mastering)
- Hamlet – Amnesia (mixing/mastering)
- Powerwolf – Blood of the Saints
- Nightrage – Insidious (mixing/mastering)
- Confession – The Long Way Home
- Shadowside – Inner Monster Out
- Myrath – Tales of the Sands (mixing)
- Adept – Death Dealers

=== 2012 ===
- A Breach of Silence – Dead or Alive
- At the Skylines – The Secrets to Life (producer)
- Deathronic – Duality Chaos (mixing/mastering)
- Eths – III
- Far West Battlefront – Chapters (mixing/mastering)
- Feed Her to the Sharks – Savage Seas
- Furnaze – None More Black
- Midnight in Alaska – Boundless
- Buried in Verona – Notorious
- InnerSiege – Kingdom of Shadows (mixing/mastering)

=== 2013 ===
- Delta – The End of Philosophy (mixing)
- Artificial Heart – A Heart Once Lost (mixing/mastering)
- Adept – Silence the World
- Raven Lord – Descent to the Underworld (mixing)
- Desolated – Disorder of Mind (mastering)
- Outrage – Outraged
- Powerwolf – Preachers of the Night
- Solium Fatalis – Solium Fatalis (mixing/mastering)
- Primitai – Rise Again (mixing/mastering)
- Excrecor – Hypnotic Affliction (mastering)

=== 2014 ===
- Tellus Terror – EZ Life DV8 (mixing and mastering)
- I Killed the Prom Queen – Beloved
- Architects – Lost Forever // Lost Together
- HammerFall – (r)Evolution
- A Breach of Silence – The Darkest Road (producer)
- At the Gates – At War with Reality
- Forget My Silence – Supersonic

=== 2015 ===
- Dawn Protection – Eternal (mixing and mastering)
- Powerwolf – Blessed & Possessed (producer)
- Buried in Verona – Vultures Above, Lions Below
- Chabtan – The Kiss of Coatlicue (mastering)

=== 2016 ===
- Follow My Lead – Spit, Kick, Revolt.
- Architects – All Our Gods Have Abandoned Us
- HammerFall – Built to Last

=== 2018 ===
- The Moor – Jupiter's Immigrants (mixing and mastering)

=== 2019 ===
- O.Y.D. – Indigo
- Voice of Ruin – Acheron
- The Offering – Home
- Lagerstein – 25/7

=== 2020 ===
- Aqvilea - Beyond the Elysian Fields

=== 2021 ===
- Iotunn – Access All Worlds (mixing and mastering)
- The Moor – Wrath of Vultures (mixing and mastering)
- The Moor – Emissaries (mixing and mastering)
- Act of Denial – Negative (mixing and mastering
- Obscura – A Valediction (mixing and mastering)
- Cognizance (band) - Upheaval (mixing and mastering)

=== 2022 ===
- Nightrage – Abyss Rising

=== 2023 ===
- Saidon – Saidon
- Killsorrow – Wasteland Chronicles

=== 2024 ===
- The Moor – Ombra
- Hammerfall – Avenge the Fallen
- Thermality – The Final Hours

=== 2025 ===
- Obscura – A Sonication

=== 2026 ===
- Dimmu Borgir – Grand Serpent Rising

== See also ==
- Dream Evil
- Studio Fredman
