= Patrik Jerksten =

Swedish record producer

- Born: 19 July 1974 (age 50); Sweden
- Occupation(s): Drummer, sound engineer

Anders Patrik Jerksten (born 19 July 1974), also known as Patrik J., Patrik J. Sten or Pat Power, is a Swedish sound engineer and drummer, he has played for Passenger, The Fifth Sun, and Dream Evil. He has worked extensively in the famous Studio Fredman and has engineering, mixing and production credits for many heavy metal bands such as Dimmu Borgir, The Haunted, Firewind, Nightrage, Darkest Hour and Susperia.

In 2006 he was invited into the ranks of Dream Evil, the heavy/power metal band featuring his Studio Fredman colleague Fredrik Nordström, as the replacement for their departed drummer Snowy Shaw.

== Credits ==
- "Cranking the Sirens" from Figure Number Five by Soilwork (musical composition)
