= ProgPower USA =

Annual American music festival

- Logo for ProgPower USA
- Genre: Progressive metal Power metal
- Dates: February (2001); June (2022); September (2003–2006, 2008–2019, 2023–present); October (2007); November (2001–2002)
- Venue: J.J. Kelley's (2001); Center Stage Theater (2001–2019, 2022–present)
- Locations: Lansing, Illinois (2001); Atlanta, Georgia (2001–2019, 2022–present)
- Years active: 2001–2019, 2022–present
- Founders: Glenn Harveston
- Website: progpowerusa.com

ProgPower USA is a music festival held annually in the United States that primarily focuses on progressive metal and power metal. It was founded in 2001. Its upcoming edition, ProgPower USA XXVI is scheduled to take place on September 9-11, 2027. The festival's band selection process focuses on quality over quantity. In addition to the emphasis on the power and progressive metal genres, the festival has branched out into other genres with the inclusion of the "oddball" slot that does not fit the normal motif. ProgPower USA gives bands that have never performed in the States a chance to perform in the country. The festival has been described as a cultural experience for fans with autograph signing sessions, guest appearances, reunions, and meet-and-greets. The festival has hosted over 70 bands' USA debuts including Blind Guardian, Gamma Ray, Nightwish, and Stratovarius.

== History ==
ProgPower USA began in 2001. The very first festival was February 23–24, 2001, in Lansing, Illinois, just outside Chicago, at J.J. Kelley's. The subsequent events have been held in Atlanta, Georgia, at the Center Stage Theater (formerly Earthlink Live).

Festival founder and retired promoter, Glenn Harveston's notion of ProgPower USA began over dinner among friends after attending the Powermad festival in Baltimore, Maryland. As the festival progressed, the roster scope diversified with the intent of reaching a larger fan base. The brand's international success is based upon an unofficial partnership with ProgPower Europe. The festival overcame early hardship from an attendance perspective due to the tragic events of September 11 at ProgPower II and flourished with multiple sell-outs over the next 13 years.

ProgPower XXI was notorious for being delayed twice by the COVID-19 pandemic and being the first edition to be held in June.

In the program for ProgPower XIX (as well as repeated posts on social media), Glenn announced ProgPower XXV (held in 2026) would be his final year of the festival.

Starting with ProgPower XXVI in 2027, the festival will be promoted by Milton Mendonça.

== Lineups ==
=== February 2001 ===
ProgPower USA I was held at J.J. Kelley's in Lansing, Illinois, on February 23–24, 2001.

| ProgPower USA I | Country of origin |
|---|---|
| Onward | USA |
| Etheria | USA |
| Power of Omens | USA |
| Zero Hour | USA |
| Reading Zero | USA |
| Ion Vein | USA |
| Destiny's End | USA |
| Jag Panzer | USA |
| Evergrey | Sweden |
| Pain of Salvation | Sweden |
| Symphony X | USA |

=== November 2001 ===
ProgPower USA II was held at Center Stage (then called Earthlink Live) in Atlanta, Georgia on November 9 & 10, 2001.

| ProgPower USA II | Country of origin |
|---|---|
| Superior | Germany |
| Balance of Power | England |
| Nightingale | Sweden |
| Spiral Architect | Norway |
| Steel Prophet | USA |
| Angel Dust | Germany |
| Ark | Norway |
| Evergrey | Sweden |
| Kamelot | USA |
| Symphony X | USA |

=== 2002 ===
ProgPower USA III was held at Center Stage (then called Earthlink Live) in Atlanta, Georgia, on November 15–16, 2002. The ProgPower USA III Pre-Show Party was held Thursday November 14, 2002, at The Riviera Club in Atlanta, Georgia.

Pre-Show Party - Thursday November 14, 2002

| Pre-Show Party | Country of origin |
|---|---|
| Cea Serin | USA |
| Persephone's Dream | USA |
| Magistral | USA |

Day 1 - Friday November 15, 2002

| ProgPower USA III - Day 1 | Country of origin |
|---|---|
| Zero Hour | USA |
| Silent Force | Germany |
| Edguy | Germany |
| Blind Guardian | Germany |
| Pain of Salvation | Sweden |

Day 2 - Saturday November 16, 2002

| ProgPower USA III - Day 2 | Country of origin |
|---|---|
| Reading Zero | USA |
| Threshold | United Kingdom |
| The Devin Townsend Band | Canada |
| Gamma Ray | Germany |
| Angra | Brazil |

=== 2003 ===
ProgPower USA IV was held on September 5–6, 2003, at Center Stage (then called Earthlink Live) in Atlanta, Georgia.

| ProgPower USA IV | Country of origin |
|---|---|
| Redemption | USA |
| Mercenary | Denmark |
| Vanden Plas | Germany |
| Nightwish | Finland |
| Symphony X | USA |
| Pagan's Mind | Norway |
| Secret Sphere | Italy |
| Circle II Circle | USA |
| Evergrey | Sweden |
| Rage | Germany |

Pre-Show Party

The ProgPower USA IV Pre-Show Party was held September 4, 2003, at The Riviera Club in Atlanta, Georgia.

| Pre-Show Party | Country of origin |
|---|---|
| Katagory V | USA |
| Stride | USA |
| Prymary | USA |

=== 2004 ===
ProgPower USA V took place on September 17–18, 2004, at Center Stage Atlanta (then called Earthlink Live) in Atlanta, Georgia.

| ProgPower USA V | Country of origin |
|---|---|
| Into Eternity | Canada |
| Dreamscape | Germany |
| Tad Morose | Sweden |
| Kamelot | USA |
| Weapons of Mass Destruction | USA |
| Adagio | France |
| Wuthering Heights | Denmark |
| Brainstorm | Germany |
| Pain of Salvation | Sweden |
| Edguy | Germany |

Showcase

The Showcase took place on Thursday September 16, 2004, at The Eleven50 Club.

| Showcase | Country of origin |
|---|---|
| Prototype | USA |
| Magistral | USA |
| Enertia | USA |
| Halcyon Way | USA |

=== 2005 ===
ProgPower USA VI took place on September 16–17, 2005 at Center Stage Atlanta (then called Earthlink Live) in Atlanta, Georgia.

| ProgPower USA VI | Country of origin |
|---|---|
| Manticora | Denmark |
| Circus Maximus | Norway |
| Orphaned Land | Israel |
| Conception | Norway |
| Angra | Brazil |
| Stride | USA |
| Symphorce | Germany |
| Pink Cream 69 | Germany |
| Therion | Sweden |
| Stratovarius | Finland |

Showcase

The Showcase took place on Thursday September 15, 2005, at The Loft (above Center Stage) in Atlanta, Georgia.

| Showcase | Country of origin |
|---|---|
| Dreamscape | Germany |
| D.C. Cooper | USA |
| Outworld | USA |
| Orphaned Land (acoustic set) | Israel |

=== 2006 ===
ProgPower USA VII took place on September 15–16, 2006 at Center Stage in Atlanta, Georgia.

| ProgPower USA VII | Country of origin |
|---|---|
| Pyramaze | Denmark |
| Savage Circus | Germany/Sweden |
| Freak Kitchen | Sweden |
| Mercenary | Denmark |
| Evergrey | Sweden |
| Zero Hour | USA |
| Vision Divine | Italy |
| Thunderstone | Finland |
| Epica | Netherlands |
| Jørn | Norway |

Showcase

The Showcase took place on Thursday September 14, 2006, at The Loft (above Center Stage) in Atlanta, Georgia.

| Showcase | Country of origin |
|---|---|
| Theocracy | USA |
| Circus Maximus | Norway |
| Leatherwolf | USA |
| Circle II Circle | USA |

=== 2007 ===
ProgPower USA VIII took place on October 5–6, 2007 at Center Stage Atlanta in Atlanta, Georgia.

| ProgPower USA VIII | Country of origin |
|---|---|
| Raintime | Italy |
| Communic | Norway |
| Virgin Steele | USA |
| Redemption | USA |
| Pagan's Mind | Norway |
| Sonata Arctica | Finland |
| Firewind | Greece |
| Threshold | United Kingdom |
| Primal Fear | Germany |
| After Forever | Netherlands |
| All Star Jam | n/a |

The All Star Jam was a collaboration of members of various bands who performed throughout the weekend playing familiar classic metal songs.

Showcase

The Showcase took place on Thursday October 4, 2007, at Center Stage in Atlanta, Georgia. From 2007 forward all Showcases (now called the Kick-Off) take place at the main Center Stage theater.

| Kick-Off | Country of origin |
|---|---|
| Halcyon Way | USA |
| Krucible | USA |
| Cellador | USA |
| Freak Kitchen | Sweden |

=== 2008 ===
ProgPower USA IX took place on September 26–27, 2008 at Center Stage Atlanta in Atlanta, Georgia.

| ProgPower USA IX | Country of origin |
|---|---|
| Pathosray | Italy |
| Elvenking | Italy |
| Andromeda | Sweden |
| Iron Savior | Germany |
| Riverside | Poland |
| Amorphis | Finland |
| Saint Deamon | Sweden |
| Spheric Universe Experience | France |
| Rob Rock | USA |
| Mustasch | Sweden |
| Jon Oliva's Pain | USA |
| Iced Earth | USA |

Kick-Off

This Kick-Off for this year was billed as the Hellish Rock World Tour as Manticora, Gamma Ray and Helloween were on tour at the time and used the Showcase date as a regular tour stop. This event took place in the main Center Stage theater on Thursday September 25, 2008.

| Kick-Off | Country of origin |
|---|---|
| Manticora | Denmark |
| Gamma Ray | Germany |
| Helloween | Germany |

Mid-Week Mayhem

The first Mid-Week Mayhem at ProgPower USA was held at The Loft (above Center Stage on Wednesday September 24, 2008, in Atlanta, Georgia.

| Mid-Week Mayhem | Country of origin |
|---|---|
| Circle II Circle | USA |
| Midnight | USA |
| Eclipsed by Sanity | USA |

=== 2009 ===
ProgPower USA X took place on September 11–12, 2009 at Center Stage Atlanta in Atlanta, Georgia.

| ProgPower USA X | Country of origin |
|---|---|
| Cage | USA |
| Mindflow | Brazil |
| Diablo Swing Orchestra | Sweden |
| Sabaton | Sweden |
| Royal Hunt | Denmark |
| Crimson Glory | USA |
| Circus Maximus | Norway |
| Orphaned Land | Israel |
| Pagan's Mind | Norway |
| Brainstorm | Germany |
| Fates Warning | USA |

Kick-Off

The Kick-Off took place on Thursday September 10, 2009, at Center Stage in Atlanta, Georgia.

| Kick-Off | Country of origin |
|---|---|
| Future's End | USA |
| Suspyre | USA |
| Enchant | USA |
| Primal Fear | Germany |

=== 2010 ===
ProgPower USA XI took place on September 10–11, 2010 at Center Stage Atlanta in Atlanta, Georgia.

| ProgPower USA XI | Country of origin |
|---|---|
| Illusion Suite | Norway |
| Stormwarrior | Germany |
| Leaves' Eyes | Germany/Norway |
| Seventh Wonder | Sweden |
| Týr | Faroe Islands |
| Nocturnal Rites | Sweden |
| Kamelot | USA |
| Blackguard | Canada |
| Oceans of Sadness | Belgium |
| DGM | Italy |
| Delain | Netherlands |
| Tarot | Finland |
| HammerFall | Sweden |

Kick-Off

The Kick-Off took place on Thursday September 9, 2010, at Center Stage in Atlanta, Georgia.

| Kick-Off | Country of origin |
|---|---|
| Six Minute Century | USA |
| Borealis | Canada |
| Leprous | Norway |
| Accept | Germany |

Mid-Week Mayhem

The Mid-Week Mayhem took place on Wednesday September 8, 2010, at The Loft at Center Stage in Atlanta, Georgia.

| Mid-Week Mayhem | Country of origin |
|---|---|
| Seven Kingdoms | USA |
| Vangough | USA |
| Ross the Boss | USA |

=== 2011 ===
ProgPower USA XII took place on September 16–17, 2011 at Center Stage Atlanta in Atlanta, Georgia.

| ProgPower USA XII | Country of origin |
|---|---|
| Creation's End | USA |
| Darkwater | Sweden |
| Voyager | Australia |
| Eldritch | Italy |
| Mob Rules | Germany |
| Ihsahn | Norway |
| Sanctuary | USA |
| Haken | United Kingdom |
| While Heaven Wept | USA |
| Red Circuit | Germany |
| Labyrinth | Italy |
| Forbidden | USA |
| Therion | Sweden |

Kick-Off

The Kick-Off took place on Thursday September 15, 2011, at Center Stage in Atlanta, Georgia.

| Kick-Off | Country of origin |
|---|---|
| PowerGlove | USA |
| Vanden Plas | Germany |
| Evergrey | Sweden |

Mid-Week mayhem

The Mid-Week Mayhem took place on Wednesday September 14, 2010, at The Loft at Center Stage in Atlanta, Georgia.

- Evergrey (Acoustic) followed by metal karaoke.

=== 2012 ===
ProgPower USA XIII took place on September 14–15, 2012, at Center Stage Atlanta in Atlanta, Georgia.

| ProgPower USA XIII | Country of origin |
|---|---|
| Sinbreed | Germany |
| Kingcrow | Italy |
| Amaranthe | Sweden |
| Serenity | Austria |
| Primordial | Ireland |
| Redemption | USA |
| Epica | Netherlands |
| Beyond the Bridge | Germany |
| Lanfear | Germany |
| Solution .45 | Sweden |
| Mystic Prophecy | Germany |
| MaYaN | Netherlands |
| Pretty Maids | Denmark |
| Symphony X | USA |

Instead of a Kick-Off and Mid-Week Mayhem, Nightwish and Kamelot performed Wednesday and Thursday night before the festival, September 12–13, 2012.

=== 2013 ===
ProgPower USA XIV took place on September 6–7, 2013, at Center Stage Atlanta in Atlanta, Georgia.

| ProgPower USA XIV | County of Origin |
|---|---|
| Damnation Angels | United Kingdom |
| Myrath | Tunisia |
| Xandria | Germany |
| Wolverine | Sweden |
| Ashes of Ares | USA |
| Soilwork | Sweden |
| Shadow Gallery | USA |
| Divinity Compromised | USA |
| Heaven's Cry | Canada |
| Wolf | Sweden |
| Circus Maximus | Norway |
| Armored Saint | USA |
| Sabaton | Sweden |

Kick-Off

The Kick-Off took place on Thursday September 5, 2013, at Center Stage) in Atlanta, Georgia.

| Kick-Off | Country of origin |
|---|---|
| In The Silence | USA |
| Circle II Circle | USA |
| Luca Turilli's Rhapsody | Italy |

Mid-week Mayhem

The Mid-Week Mayhem took place on Wednesday September 4, 2013, at The Loft at Center Stage) in Atlanta, Georgia.

| Mid-Week Mayhem | Country of origin |
|---|---|
| Morglbl | France |
| Mindcrime (a Queenrsyche Tribute) | USA |

=== 2014 ===
ProgPower USA XV took place on September 12–13, 2014, at Center Stage Atlanta in Atlanta, Georgia.

| ProgPower XV | Country of origin |
|---|---|
| Need | Greece |
| Orden Ogan | Germany |
| Leprous | Norway |
| Overkill | USA |
| Seventh Wonder (playing Mercy Falls in its entirety) | Sweden |
| Stratovarius (playing Visions in its entirety) | Finland |
| Withem | Norway |
| Divided Multitude | Norway |
| Voodoo Circle | Germany |
| Masterplan | Germany |
| Pain of Salvation (playing Remedy Lane in its entirety) | Sweden |
| Jon Oliva's Pain (playing Savatage's Streets: A Rock Opera in its entirety) | USA |

Kick-Off

The Kick-Off took place on Thursday September 11, 2014, at Center Stage) in Atlanta, Georgia.

| Kick-Off | Country of origin |
|---|---|
| Draekon | USA |
| DGM | Italy |
| Pagan's Mind (playing Celestial Entrance in its entirety) | Norway |

Mid-Week Mayhem

The Mid-Week Mayhem took place on Wednesday September 10, 2014.

| Mid-Week Mayhem | Country of origin |
|---|---|
| Theocracy | USA |
| Vangough | USA |
| Pain of Salvation | Sweden |

=== 2015 ===
ProgPower USA XVI took place on September 11–12, 2015, at Center Stage Atlanta in Atlanta, Georgia.

| ProgPower XVI | Country of origin |
|---|---|
| Native Construct | USA |
| Jeff Scott Soto | USA |
| Voyager (set list chosen by the fans) | Australia |
| Anathema | United Kingdom |
| Falconer (final live show) | Sweden |
| Helker | Argentina |
| Unleash the Archers | Canada |
| Dragonland | Sweden |
| Riverside | Poland |
| Royal Hunt (playing Paradox in its entirety) | Denmark/USA |
| Angra (playing Holy Land in its entirety) | Brazil |

Kick-Off

The Kick-Off took place on Thursday September 10, 2015, at Center Stage in Atlanta, Georgia.

| Kick-Off | Country of origin |
|---|---|
| Almah | Brazil |
| Dragonland | Sweden |
| Armored Saint | USA |
| Saxon | England |

Mid-Week Mayhem

The Mid-Week Mayhem took place on Wednesday September 9, 2015, at The Loft at Center Stage in Atlanta, Georgia.

| Mid-Week Mayhem | Country of origin |
|---|---|
| Halcyon Way | USA |
| Ashes of Ares | USA |
| Voyager (playing I Am the ReVolution in its entirety) | Australia |
| Evergrey | Sweden |

=== 2016 ===
ProgPower USA XVII took place on September 7–10, 2016, at Center Stage Atlanta in Atlanta, Georgia. Starting in 2016, ProgPower USA became a full four-day event. The Mid-Week Mayhem (Wednesday) and Kick-Off (Thursday) shows are now known as Days 1 and 2 respectively of the new format, while the traditional ProgPower USA Friday and Saturday shows are now Days 3 and 4 respectively.

Days 1 & 2

Days 1 and 2 (September 7–8, 2016) took place at Center Stage in Atlanta, Georgia. Day 2 (Thursday show) was called the Promoter's Pick night. There were four bands per day.

| ProgPower XVII – Days 1 & 2 | Country of origin |
|---|---|
| LORD | Australia |
| Stream of Passion | Netherlands |
| Spock's Beard | USA |
| DragonForce | United Kingdom |
| Ghost Ship Octavius | USA |
| Pyramaze | Denmark |
| Circus Maximus | Norway |
| Blind Guardian | Germany |

Days 3 & 4

Days 3 and 4 (September 9–10, 2016) took place at Center Stage in Atlanta, Georgia. These days are considered to be main event with six bands per day.

| ProgPower XVII – Days 3 & 4 | Country of origin |
|---|---|
| Ascendia | Canada |
| Vanishing Point | Australia |
| Freedom Call | Germany |
| The Gentle Storm | Netherlands |
| Scar Symmetry | Sweden |
| Fates Warning (playing Awaken the Guardian in its entirety, with original lineup featuring John Arch) | USA |
| Savage Messiah | United Kingdom |
| Serious Black | Multinational |
| Green Carnation (playing Light of Day, Day of Darkness in its entirety) | Norway |
| Refuge (Classic Rage lineup 1988–1993) | Germany |
| Haken | United Kingdom |
| Devin Townsend (with special guest Anneke van Giersbergen) | Canada |

=== 2017 ===
ProgPower USA XVIII took place on September 6–9, 2017 at Center Stage Atlanta in Atlanta, Georgia.

Days 1 & 2

Days 1 and 2 took place on September 6–7, 2017, at Center Stage in Atlanta, Georgia, with four bands on Wednesday and five bands on Thursday.

| ProgPower XVIII – Days 1 & 2 | Country of origin |
|---|---|
| Power Quest | United Kingdom |
| Serenity | Austria |
| Orphaned Land | Israel |
| Haken (playing Visions in its entirety) | United Kingdom |
| Next to None | USA |
| Twilight Force | Sweden |
| Vanden Plas | Germany |
| Between the Buried and Me (playing Colors in its entirety) | USA |
| Metal Church | USA |

Days 3 & 4

Days 3 and 4 took place on September 8–9, 2017, at Center Stage in Atlanta, Georgia, with six bands per day.

| ProgPower XVIII – Days 3 & 4 | Country of origin |
|---|---|
| Daydream XI | Brazil |
| Distorted Harmony | Israel |
| Lords of Black | Spain |
| Angel Dust | Germany |
| Myrath | Tunisia |
| Mike Portnoy's Shattered Fortress (Performing the Twelve-step Suite, featuring members of Haken and The Neal Morse Band) | USA / United Kingdom |
| Seven Spires | USA |
| Dynazty | Sweden |
| Snowy Shaw | Sweden |
| Pain | Sweden |
| Amaranthe | Sweden |
| Katatonia | Sweden |

=== 2018 ===
ProgPower USA XIX took place on September 5–8, 2018 at Center Stage Atlanta in Atlanta, Georgia.

Days 1 & 2

Days 1 and 2 took place on September 5–6, 2018 at Center Stage in Atlanta, Georgia, with four bands per day.

| ProgPower XIX – Days 1 & 2 | Country of origin |
|---|---|
| Ross the Boss (Manowar set) | USA |
| Gloryhammer | Multinational |
| Nocturnal Rites | Sweden |
| Voyager | Australia |
| Cellar Darling | Switzerland |
| Oceans of Slumber | USA |
| Doro | Germany |
| Angra (25th Anniversary fans pick the set list) (playing ØMNI in its entirety) | Brazil |

Days 3 & 4

Days 3 and 4 took place on September 7–8, 2018 at Center Stage in Atlanta, Georgia, with six bands per day.

| ProgPower XIX – Days 3 & 4 | Country of origin |
|---|---|
| Manimal | Sweden |
| Persefone | Andorra |
| Bloodbound | Sweden |
| Labyrinth (playing Return to Heaven Denied Part 1 in its | Italy |
| Redemption | USA/Sweden |
| Sons of Apollo | USA |
| Triosphere | Norway |
| Eclipse (U.S. exclusive appearance) | Sweden |
| Soen | Sweden |
| VUUR | Netherlands |
| Alestorm | Multinational |
| Tarja Turunen | Finland |

=== 2019 ===
ProgPower USA XX took place on September 4–7, 2019 at Center Stage Atlanta in Atlanta, Georgia.

Days 1 & 2

Days 1 and 2 took place on September 4–5, 2019 at Center Stage in Atlanta, Georgia, with four bands per day.

| ProgPower XX – Days 1 & 2 | Country of origin |
|---|---|
| While Heaven Wept | USA |
| Theocracy | USA |
| Sanctuary | USA |
| Insomnium | Finland |
| Tomorrow's Eve | Germany |
| MaYan | Multinational |
| Galneryus | Japan |
| Evergrey | Sweden |

Days 3 & 4

Days 3 and 4 took place on September 6–7, 2019 at Center Stage in Atlanta, Georgia, with six bands per day.

| ProgPower XX – Days 3 & 4 | Country of origin |
|---|---|
| Paladin | USA |
| Subsignal | Germany |
| Barren Earth | Finland |
| Psychotic Waltz | USA |
| Orden Ogan | Germany |
| Seventh Wonder | Sweden |
| Sorcerer | Sweden |
| Jag Panzer | USA |
| Caligula's Horse | Australia |
| Poets of the Fall | Finland |
| Threshold | United Kingdom |
| Demons & Wizards | Multinational |

=== 2022 ===
ProgPower USA XXI took place on June 1–4, 2022, at Center Stage Atlanta in Atlanta, Georgia.

Days 1 & 2

Days 1 and 2 took place on June 1–2, 2022, at Center Stage in Atlanta, Georgia.

| ProgPower XXI – Days 1 & 2 | Country of origin |
|---|---|
| Mindmaze | USA |
| KLONE | France |
| Flotsam and Jetsam | USA |
| Hypocrisy | Sweden |
| Spektra | Brazil |
| Wilderun | USA |
| Seven Spires | USA |
| Pain of Salvation | Sweden |
| Stratovarius | Finland |

Days 3 & 4

Days 3 and 4 took place on June 3–4, 2022 at Center Stage in Atlanta, Georgia.

| ProgPower XXI – Days 3 & 4 | Country of origin |
|---|---|
| The Cyberiam | USA |
| Aether Realm | USA |
| Witherfall | USA |
| Jason Bieler & the Baron von Bielski Orchestra | USA |
| Jeff Scott Soto (Tribute to Queen) | USA |
| Conception | Norway |
| Arion | Finland |
| Thank You Scientist | USA |
| Riot V | USA |
| Ray Alder | USA |
| Ihsahn | Norway |
| Turilli / Lione Rhapsody | Italy |

=== 2023 ===
ProgPower USA XXII took place on September 6–9, 2023 at Center Stage Atlanta in Atlanta, Georgia.

Days 1 & 2

Days 1 and 2 took place on September 6–7, 2023 at Center Stage in Atlanta, Georgia.

| ProgPower XXI – Days 1 & 2 | Country of origin |
|---|---|
| The Reticent | USA |
| Elvenking | Italy |
| Cynic | USA |
| Swallow the Sun | Finland |
| Doro | Germany |
| Seven Kingdoms | USA |
| Zero Hour | USA |
| The Halo Effect | Sweden |
| VOLA | Denmark |
| Beast in Black | Multinational |

Days 3 & 4

Days 3 and 4 took place on September 8–9, 2023 at Center Stage in Atlanta, Georgia.

| ProgPower XXII – Days 3 & 4 | Country of origin |
|---|---|
| The Cryptex | Germany |
| Battle Beast | Finland |
| Ad Infinitum | Switzerland |
| Green Carnation | Norway |
| Caligula's Horse | Australia |
| Kamelot | Multi-National |
| Poverty's No Crime | Germany |
| Evil Invaders | Belgium |
| Visions of Atlantis | Austria |
| Delain | Netherlands |
| Unleash the Archers | Canada |
| Myrath | Tunisia |

=== 2024 ===
ProgPower USA XXIII took place on September 4–7, 2024 at Center Stage Atlanta in Atlanta, Georgia.

Days 1 & 2

Days 1 and 2 took place on September 4–5, 2024 at Center Stage in Atlanta, Georgia.

| ProgPower XXIII – Day 1 & 2 | Country of origin |
|---|---|
| Darkwater | Sweden |
| Victorius | Germany |
| Dream Evil | Sweden |
| Circus Maximus | Norway |
| Angra | Brazil/Italy |
| Nospūn | USA |
| Temperance | Italy |
| Earthside | USA |
| Twilight Force | Sweden/Italy |
| Leprous | Norway |
| Dark Tranquillity | Sweden |

Days 3 & 4

Days 3 and 4 took place on September 6–7, 2024 at Center Stage in Atlanta, Georgia.

| ProgPower XXIII – Days 3 & 4 | Country of origin |
|---|---|
| Striker | Canada |
| Fifth Angel | USA |
| Elegy | The Netherlands |
| Soen | Sweden |
| Lovebites | Japan |
| Amorphis | Finland |
| Frozen Crown | Italy |
| Disillusion | Germany |
| Illumishade | Switzerland |
| Damian Wilson | UK |
| Winger (Performing "Pull") | USA |
| Pagan's Mind | Norway |

=== 2025 ===
ProgPower USA XXIV took place on September 3–6, 2025 at Center Stage Atlanta in Atlanta, Georgia.

Days 1 & 2

Days 1 and 2 took place on September 3–4, 2025 at Center Stage in Atlanta, Georgia.

| ProgPower XXIV – Days 1 & 2 | Country of origin |
|---|---|
| Aries Descendant | USA / Denmark |
| Secret Sphere | Italy |
| Eclipse | Sweden |
| Green Carnation | Norway |
| Visions of Atlantis | Austria |
| Alterium | Italy |
| Maestrick | Brazil |
| Anciients | Canada |
| Novembers Doom | USA |
| VOLA | Denmark |
| Sonata Arctica | Finland |

Days 3 & 4

Days 3 and 4 took place on September 5–6, 2025 at Center Stage in Atlanta, Georgia.

| ProgPower XXIV – Days 3 & 4 | Country of origin |
|---|---|
| Sometime in February | USA |
| Majestica | Sweden |
| Be'lakor | Australia |
| Rivers of Nihil | USA |
| ProgJect | Multinational |
| Orden Ogan | Germany |
| Lux Terminus | USA |
| Night Demon | USA |
| Saigon Kick (Featuring Jeff Scott Soto) | USA |
| Cemetery Skyline | International |
| Skáld | France |
| Symphony X | USA |

=== 2026 ===
ProgPower USA XXV took place on September 9–12, 2026 at Center Stage Atlanta in Atlanta, Georgia. This was the final ProgPower for both Glenn Harveston (Days 3 and 4) and Nathan Block (Day 1) as promoters.

Days 1 & 2

Days 1 and 2 took place on September 9–10, 2026 at Center Stage in Atlanta, Georgia.

| ProgPower XXV – Days 1 & 2 | Country of origin |
|---|---|
| The Reticent | USA |
| Noveria | Italy |
| Conception | Norway |
| Threshold | United Kingdom |
| Ensiferum | Finland |
| Fires in the Distance | USA |
| Scardust | Israel |
| Teramaze | Australia |
| Firewind | Greece |

Days 3 & 4

Days 3 and 4 took place on September 11–12, 2026 at Center Stage in Atlanta, Georgia.

| ProgPower XXV – Days 3 & 4 | Country of origin |
|---|---|
| DGM | Italy |
| Brainstorm | Germany |
| Crimson Glory | USA |
| Ashes of Ares | USA |
| Hammerfall | Sweden |
| Evergrey | Sweden |
| Sunburst | Greece |
| Seven Spires | USA |
| Roy Khan | Norway |
| Redemption | Multinational |
| The Gathering feat. Anneke van Giersbergen | Netherlands |
| Voyager | Australia |

=== 2027 ===
ProgPower USA XXVI is scheduled to take on September 9–11, 2027 at Center Stage Atlanta in Atlanta, Georgia. This will be the first ProgPower USA that will be promoted solely by Milton Mendonca. The festival will change from a four day festival to a three day festival moving forward.

Day 1

Day1 is scheduled to take place on September 9, 2027 at Center Stage in Atlanta, Georgia.

| ProgPower XXVI – Day 1 | Country of origin |
|---|---|
| Advent Horizon | USA |
| Silent Skies | Multinational |
| Metal Church | USA |
| H.E.A.T | Sweden |
| Eluveitie | Switzerland |

Day 2

Day 2 is scheduled to take place on September 10, 2027 at Center Stage in Atlanta, Georgia.

| ProgPower XXVI – Day 2 | Country of origin |
|---|---|
| Royal Sorrow | Finland |
| Triosphere | Norway |
| Einar Solberg | Norway |
| Omnium Gatherum | Finland |
| Unleash the Archers | Canada |
| Wind Rose | Italy |

Day 3

Day 3 is scheduled to take place on September 11, 2027 at Center Stage in Atlanta, Georgia.

| ProgPower XXVI – Day 3 | Country of origin |
|---|---|
| Power Paladin | Iceland |
| Ihlo | United Kingdom |
| Vision Divine | Italy |
| Masterplan | Germany |
| Lynch Mob (40th Anniversary of Dokken's "Back For The Attack”) | USA |
| Nevermore | USA |

== Postponed and cancelled lineups ==
=== 2020–2021 ===
ProgPower USA XXI was originally scheduled to take place on September 9–12, 2020 at Center Stage Atlanta in Atlanta, Georgia. However, due to the COVID-19 pandemic it was postponed. This was announced on May 22, 2020.

The rescheduled dates for ProgPower USA XXI were to take place on September 8–11, 2021 at Center Stage Atlanta in Atlanta, Georgia. Due to the COVID-19 pandemic, it was postponed again.

== Photo galleries ==
- Ahola, Esa. ProgPower USA. Web. November 28, 2013.
- Thomas, Allen Ross. ProgPower USA. Web. November 28, 2013.
- Schmidt, Stephen. ProgPower USA. Web. November 28, 2013.
