= Strange and Beautiful (Crimson Glory album) =

Studio album by Crimson Glory
- Released: June 24, 1991
- Studios: Kajem/Victory Studios - Victory West (Gladwyne); Kajem/Victory Studios - Victory East (Philadelphia)
- Genres: Hard rock; heavy metal
- Length: 58:40
- Labels: Atlantic (US); Roadrunner (Europe)
- Producers: Mitch Goldfarb, Jon Drenning

Crimson Glory chronology
Transcendence (1988)	Strange and Beautiful (1991)	Astronomica (1999)

Professional ratings
Review scores
Source	Rating
AllMusic	2/5 stars
Collector's Guide to Heavy Metal	6/10

Strange and Beautiful is the third studio album from progressive metal band Crimson Glory. Signed to Atlantic Records in 1991, this album was a marked stylistic departure from their previous albums' decidedly progressive metal sound to a more bluesy, hard rock sound. It was the first album without longtime members, guitarist Ben Jackson and drummer Dana Burnell and it was also the last to feature vocalist Midnight. Two songs were co-written with former Drexel University Associate Professor and entertainment attorney, Marcy Rauer Wagman, while the first single "The Chant" was written by outside songwriters M. McKinley & Marti Frederiksen. Midnight departed the band prior to the tour and was replaced by future Michael Schenker Group frontman, David Van Landing. It was the only album in their canon to feature drummer Ravi Jakhotia and the band went on hiatus following the supporting tour.

== Track listing ==
No.	Title	Writer(s)	Length
1.	"Strange and Beautiful"	Jon Drenning, Midnight	6:17
2.	"Promise Land"	Drenning, Jeff Lords, Marcy Rauer	5:22
3.	"Love and Dreams"	Drenning, Lords, Midnight	5:29
4.	"The Chant"	Marti Frederiksen, M. McKinley	3:45
5.	"Dance on Fire"	Drenning, Lords, Midnight	5:27
6.	"Song for Angels"	Drenning, Rauer	5:19
7.	"In the Mood"	Drenning, Lords, Midnight	5:55
8.	"Starchamber"	Drenning, Lords, Midnight	7:28
9.	"Deep Inside Your Heart"	Drenning, Lords, Midnight	5:14
10.	"Make You Love Me"	Drenning, Lords, Midnight	4:05
11.	"Far Away"	Midnight	4:44

== Personnel ==
- Midnight – lead vocals, background vocals
- Jon Drenning – guitars, background vocals
- Jeff Lords – bass, background vocals
- Ravi Jakhotia – drums, percussion

Additional musicians

- John Avarese – keyboards
- Annette Hardeman, Charlene & Paula Holloway – background vocals
- Ric Sandler – grand piano
- Daryl Burgee – percussion
- Ron Kerber – saxophone
- Babatunde Olatunji – intro vocal to "Promise Land"

Production

- Jon Drenning - producer, mixing
- Mitch Goldfarb – producer, engineer, mixing
- Brook Hendricks – second engineer
- Brian Stover, John Fairhead, Jeff Chestek, Cherri Parker – assistant engineers
- George Marino – mastering at Sterling Sound, New York
- Justice Mitchell – artwork
