= Dana Burnell =

American drummer

- Born: January 26, 1963
- Genres: Heavy metal, progressive metal
- Occupations: Musician, songwriter
- Instruments: Drums, vocals
- Years active: 1979–present
- Labels: Roadrunner, MCA, Spitfire,

Dana Burnell is an American musician best known for being the original drummer of the bands Crimson Glory, and A Persuasive Reason and Parish.

== Biography ==
Burnell co-founded the group that would eventually become known as Crimson Glory along with four other musicians, including rhythm guitarist Ben Jackson in Sarasota, Florida in 1979 under the name Pierced Arrow (later changed to 'Beowulf'). This group underwent multiple personnel changes before Jackson and Burnell were joined by the other three musicians who would compose the classic lineup of Crimson Glory - vocalist Midnight, lead guitarist Jon Drenning, and bassist Jeff Lords. Burnell and Jackson played on the albums Crimson Glory and Transcendence before leaving the group in 1989. They later formed the band Parish and began recording what would be their sole album Envision, however, Burnell ultimately left in the middle of the recording sessions due to family issues. He was replaced by Rich Tabor, who would finish the recording and subsequently was the only drummer credited on most original pressings of Envision until it was re-released in 2019 with a DVD and bonus material.

In 2006, Burnell reunited with the original lineup of Crimson Glory as they performed sporadically for about a year until Midnight was arrested and charged for charged with driving under the influence, prompting the band to call on Wade Black, who appeared on their fourth album Astronomica, to rejoin. In 2010, Crimson Glory reemerged with new vocalist Todd La Torre and tentative plans for a fifth album. The band toured for three years before La Torre left the band, citing the band's inactivity and apparent lack of interest in writing. La Torre moved on to join Queensrÿche and Crimson Glory was on hiatus once more.

In 2012, Burnell joined the band A Persuasive Reason.

== Discography ==
With Crimson Glory

Year	Title
1986	Crimson Glory
1988	Transcendence
2026	Chasing the Hydra

With Parish

Year	Title	Notes
1995	Envision	Tracks 1, 3, 6, and 8 only according to a Japanese pressing of the original. Disc 2 of the 2019 CD/DVD re-release.
