= Crimson Glory (album) =

Studio album by Crimson Glory
- Released: 1986
- Studio: Morrisound (Tampa, Florida)
- Genre: Heavy metal; power metal
- Length: 38:28
- Label: Par
- Producer: Dan Johnson

Crimson Glory chronology
| Crimson Glory (1986) | Transcendence (1988) |

Professional ratings
Review scores
| Source | Rating |
|---|---|
| AllMusic | 4/5 stars |
| Collector's Guide to Heavy Metal | 7/10 |
| Ride Into Glory | 97/100 |

Crimson Glory is the debut studio album by the American heavy metal band Crimson Glory, originally released in 1986 on Par Records in the US. It was later licensed by and re-issued on Roadrunner Records in Europe.

In 2006, Greek record label Black Lotus Records announced plans to release a re-mastered and expanded version with a new title, "Lost Reflections" and two previously unreleased songs, "Love Me, Kill Me" and "Dream Dancer". However, citing bankruptcy, Black Lotus ceased operations before this release came to fruition.

== Track listing ==
All tracks are written by Jon Drenning, Jeff Lords and Midnight.

Side one
| No. | Title | Length |
|---|---|---|
| 1. | "Valhalla" | 3:46 |
| 2. | "Dragon Lady" | 4:21 |
| 3. | "Heart of Steel" | 6:07 |
| 4. | "Azrael" | 5:42 |

Side two
| No. | Title | Length |
|---|---|---|
| 5. | "Mayday" | 2:59 |
| 6. | "Queen of the Masquerade" | 5:27 |
| 7. | "Angels of War" | 5:23 |
| 8. | "Lost Reflection" | 4:43 |

2008 Metal Mind CD reissue
| No. | Title | Writer(s) | Length |
|---|---|---|---|
| 9. | "Dream Dancer" | Crimson Glory | 6:54 |

== Personnel ==
Crimson Glory

- Midnight – lead vocals
- Jon Drenning – lead guitar, synclavier
- Ben Jackson – rhythm guitar
- Jeff Lords – bass guitar
- Dana Burnell – drums

Additional musicians

- Peter Abood – emulator, synclavier
- Jim Morris – emulator programming
- Lex Macar – synclavier programming

Production

- Dan Johnson – producer
- Jim Morris – engineer
- Mike Fuller – mastering at Fullersound, Miami
