= Seven Kingdoms (band) =

American power metal band

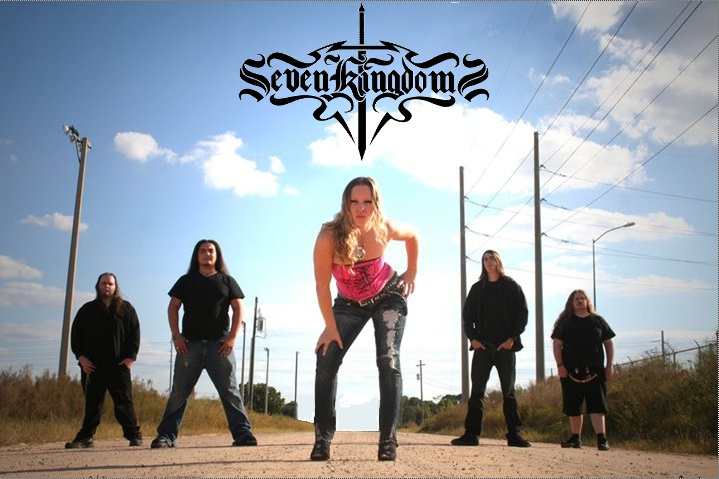

Background information
- Origin: DeLand, Florida, United States
- Genres: Heavy metal; thrash metal; power metal; symphonic metal
- Years active: 2007–present
- Label: Reigning Phoenix Music Napalm Records
- Members: Camden Cruz; Kevin Byrd; Sabrina Valentine; Colton Zeitler
- Past members: Lux Edwards; Cory Stene; John Zambrotto; Miles Neff; Aaron Sluss; John Tyler McDaniel; Keith Byrd
- Website: https://www.sevenkingdomsofficial.com

Seven Kingdoms are an American heavy metal band from DeLand, Florida. The band was formed in DeLand in 2007 by guitarist Camden Cruz and vocalist Lux Edwards, after they parted with their previous band, This Solemn Vow. The band has shifted lineups repeatedly, and currently includes guitarists Cruz and Kevin Byrd, vocalist Sabrina Valentine (Cruz's wife) and touring drummer Colton Zeitler.

The band, in an early lineup, recorded their independent debut album, Brothers of the Night, in late 2007. The album was heavily inspired by the writings of fantasy novelist George R. R. Martin. Their second album, Seven Kingdoms, featuring the current lineup, was released by Nightmare Recordings in July 2010.

Since their formation, the band has played several shows throughout the United States and Canada, including international showcase ProgPower USA in Atlanta (September 2010).

== History ==
Camden Cruz and Lux Edwards formed the band in 2007. The next two members to join were brothers Kevin and Keith Byrd on guitars and drums, respectively. Rounding out the group were John Zambrotto on keyboards, and Cory Stene playing bass. Edwards obtained several possible band names from novelist George R. R. Martin's epic fantasy series A Song of Ice and Fire, and the band members chose the name Seven Kingdoms. In August 2007 they recorded their debut album, Brothers of the Night, at Morrisound Studios in Temple Terrace, Florida. The album, heavily influenced by Martin's novels, was released independently in November 2007.

Stormborn, from the album Brothers of the Night (2007)

For the next year they toured throughout Florida in support of the album. In January 2008, they replaced Aghora at Florida's Hellstock event. In May 2008 they played at The Maximum Metal Show in St. Petersburg, Florida.

Seven Kingdoms in the studio recording the album Seven Kingdoms (2009)

In early 2009 the band moved in a new direction in preparation for its second album. During the writing of the album, the band ultimately decided that keyboards were not going to be featured, and Zambrotto was released. Edwards and Stene soon left as well. Miles Neff became the new bassist and Sabrina Valentine became the new vocalist. The second album, Seven Kingdoms, was recorded at Morrisound Studios in September 2009. In November 2009 the band signed a worldwide booking and management deal with Intromental Management. They opened for heavy metal band W.A.S.P. at Club Firestone in Orlando, Florida, in March 2010.

In April 2010, Seven Kingdoms signed a worldwide deal with Nightmare Records for their second album. That month they were the subject of an interview on Beach 92.7 radio and played SwordFest with Cage. Their second album, Seven Kingdoms, was released in July 2010. It contained 11 songs and featured an appearance by Crimson Glory / Leatherwolf singer Wade Black. Seven Kingdoms played at ProgPower USA in September 2010, opening the Midweek Mayhem event. That month they parted ways with bassist Miles Neff, who was replaced by Aaron Sluss. They entered regular rotation at Epic Rock Radio.com in October 2010. In November they began The Sacred Worlds and Songs Divine tour, opening for Blind Guardian and Holy Grail. They also played at Florida Powerfest II, a festival organized by guitarist Camden Cruz, on December 18, 2010.

On October 9, 2012, Seven Kingdoms released their third album The Fire is Mine. It would be followed by their 2016 EP In the Walls. The band has since released several more albums and EPs, and will release their sixth album titled Sono Sola on January 29, 2027 through crowdfunding campaign.

== Discography ==
Studio albums

- Brothers of the Night (2007)
- Seven Kingdoms (2010)
- The Fire Is Mine (2012)
- Decennium (2017)
- Zenith (2022)
- Sono Sola (2027)

EPs

- In the Walls (2016)
- Empty Eyes (2019)
- The Square (2024)
