= Where dragons rule =

Where dragons rule may refer to two power metal songs:

- "Where Dragons Rule", a song by Crimson Glory on 1988 studio album Transcendence
- "Where Dragons Rule", a song by DragonForce on 2003 studio album Valley of the Damned
