= M2: Descending into Madness =

Studio album by Midnight
- Released: September 16, 2014
- Studio: Fix A Flat Studios, Tampa, Florida; Ghost Mansion Studios; East Ave Recording, Sarasota, Florida
- Genre: Heavy metal
- Label: Conquest Music, Inc.
- Producer: Lee Harrison and Midnight

Midnight chronology
Sakada (2005)	M2: Descending into Madness (2014)

M2: Descending into Madness is the second and final solo album by ex-Crimson Glory frontman Midnight, released posthumously five years after his death in 2009. This album was originally released in limited edition back in 2006 and still being worked on for an open edition one year later.

== Track listing ==
All lyrics by Midnight. All music by Midnight except as noted.

Disc one
No.	Title	Writer(s)	Length
1.	"Seven Angels"	Midnight, Lee Harrison	7:00
2.	"Doc And Kate"		5:38
3.	"Descending Into Madness"		6:50
4.	"Cold Caves"		5:28
5.	"The Field"		3:01
6.	"The End"		4:36
7.	"Tea For Two"		4:59
8.	"Black Sheep"		3:30
9.	"Windows"		4:39
10.	"Little Aquafina"		3:29
11.	"Angel With An Axe"		5:47
12.	"The Last Forever"	Midnight, Matt LaPorte, Phil Anderson, Lee Harrison	8:41

Disc two
No.	Title	Writer(s)	Length
1.	"Pain"		5:22
2.	"Sparrow"		5:53
3.	"No One Ever Came"		4:31
4.	"Carnival 1"		5:01
5.	"The Plow"		1:11
6.	"Love Song (Piano)"		5:18
7.	"Egyptian Lullabye"		5:47
8.	"Plastic Jesus"	Matt McDonald, Midnight	3:55
9.	"Boxes"	Midnight, Matt LaPorte	5:53
10.	"Mermaids"		4:57
11.	"The Deep"		7:42
12.	"Arabian Nightmare"	Matt LaPorte, Midnight	12:12

Disc three
No.	Title	Writer(s)	Length
1.	"Pomegranate Wine"		2:46
2.	"Carnival 2"		5:44
3.	"Garden Of Stone"		4:55
4.	"What I Did Last Night"	Matt LaPorte, Midnight, Phil Anderson	3:04
5.	"I Will Be There"		2:48
6.	"Green Eggs Gilligan"		2:08
7.	"Silver Balloon"		4:22
8.	"Seventeen"		1:55
9.	"Sparrow 2"		3:45
10.	"Love Song (Acoustic)"		5:04
11.	"Motorcycles"	Phil Anderson, Matt LaPorte, Midnight	5:50
12.	"Tales From The Cavern"		7:36

== Personnel ==
- Midnight - All vocals, acoustic guitars
- Lee Harrison - Guitars, bass, drums, keys, fx, lute
- Matt LaPorte - Guitars, bass, mandolin, keys, programming
- Phil Anderson - Hammered dulcimer and percussion
- John Zahner - Keyboards
- Zane Black - Keyboards
- Ronnie Dee - Saxophone on "Cold Caves"
- Tim Fredenburg - Executive Producer
