= Stay Beautiful =

Stay Beautiful may refer to:

- "Stay Beautiful" (Manic Street Preachers song), a 1991 single by the Manic Street Preachers from their 1992 album Generation Terrorists
- "Stay Beautiful" (The Last Goodnight song), a 2008 single by The Last Goodnight from their 2007 album Poison Kiss
- "Stay Beautiful", a song by Taylor Swift from her 2006 album Taylor Swift
- Stay Beautiful, a glam club night run by Simon Price in London 2001-2010 and Brighton 2011-2016
