= Transcendence (Crimson Glory album) =

Studio album by Crimson Glory
- Released: November 1, 1988
- Studio: Morrisound Studios, Tampa, Florida
- Genre: Heavy metal; power metal; progressive metal
- Length: 50:24
- Label: Roadracer (Europe); MCA (US)
- Producer: Jim Morris, Tom Morris

Crimson Glory chronology
Crimson Glory (1986)	Transcendence (1988)	Strange and Beautiful (1991)

Singles from Transcendence
- 1. "Lady of Winter" Released: 1988; 2. "Lonely" Released: 1988

Transcendence is the second studio album by American heavy metal band Crimson Glory, released in 1988 via Roadracer Records (now Roadrunner Records) in Europe and MCA Records in United States. It is considered by many to be their finest work. It was recorded at Morrisound Studios.

In 2006, Black Lotus Records announced a plan to release a remastered version with a new name, "Transcendence: Renovatio". This was rumoured to feature new cover art, two bonus tracks and more, but Black Lotus ceased operations shortly thereafter and it was never released.

== Writing and recording ==
"Masque of the Red Death" is about the story written by Edgar Allan Poe. "Eternal World" was written as an instrumental for the tour of the band's first record in the Netherlands.

The drums are a combination of both live and sampled drums. The band sampled drummer Dana Burnell performing live drums into a synclavier without any cymbals, and then re-recorded the cymbals live later in order to have complete separation of drums and cymbals. Guitarist Jon Drenning stated "It was a very arduous and time consuming way to do it but at the time it seemed like something we wanted to try to achieve; a pristine, clean sound and true separation of all instruments."

== Artwork ==
The front cover artwork was made by Japanese artist Takashi Terada, which was featured on the Japanese poster art for the 1985 science fiction film Lifeforce. Following some of the album's themes of mysticism and divinity, the back cover features a Kabbalistic Tree of Life. This is superimposed by a series of runic letters which, when decoded, spell:
CRIMSON GLORY
WE WILL STRIKE DOWN THE ONES WHO LEAD US
WE ARE YOUR FUTURE – WE ARE FOREVER
TRANSCENDENCE

== Critical reception and legacy ==
Professional ratings
Review scores
Source	Rating
AllMusic	4.5/5 stars
Collector's Guide to Heavy Metal	8/10
Rock Hard	9.5/10

Upon release Kirk Blows of British magazine Music Week reviewed album positively and found it "more complex and sophisticated" than debut. He wrote: "Thoughtfully structured, powerful yet with melodic passages, Transcendence is fine testimony of a band who have the potential to fully establish themselves in the near future."

In 2005, Transcendence was ranked number 412 in Rock Hard magazine's book The 500 Greatest Rock & Metal Albums of All Time. Loudwire named it at #15 in their list "Top 25 Power Metal Albums of All Time". ThoughtCo named the album in their list "Essential Power Metal Albums".

== Track listing ==
Side one
No.	Title	Lyrics	Music	Length
1.	"Lady of Winter"	Midnight, Jon Drenning	Drenning	4:00
2.	"Red Sharks"	Dana Burnell, Drenning	Drenning, Jeff Lords	4:52
3.	"Painted Skies"	Midnight	Drenning, Midnight, Lords	5:16
4.	"Masque of the Red Death"	Midnight	Lords, Ben Jackson, Drenning	4:15
5.	"In Dark Places"	Midnight, Drenning	Drenning, Lords	7:03

Side two
No.	Title	Lyrics	Music	Length
6.	"Where Dragons Rule"	Midnight, Drenning	Drenning, Lords, Midnight	5:07
7.	"Lonely"	Midnight, Drenning	Drenning, Lords, Zahner	5:18
8.	"Burning Bridges"	Midnight	Drenning	6:32
9.	"Eternal World"	Midnight, Drenning	Drenning, Lords	3:54
10.	"Transcendence"	Midnight	Drenning (intro), Midnight	4:34

== Personnel ==
- Midnight – lead vocals, backing vocals
- Jon Drenning – lead guitar
- Ben Jackson – rhythm guitar
- Jeff Lords – bass guitar
- Dana Burnell – drums

Additional musicians

- Jim Morris – synclavier programming
- Lex Macar – synclavier programming
- John Zahner – additional synthesizer programming
- Janelle Sadler – backing vocals (haunting melodies)
- Tom Morris – backing vocals (kruschev impression)
- Jim Morris – backing vocals (mission commander)
- The Killing Crew – backing vocals
- The Red Death Mob – backing vocals
- The Dragon Beast – backing vocals

Production

- Jim Morris – producer, mixing, engineering
- Tom Morris – mixing, additional engineering
- Judd Packer, Scott Burns, Mike Gowan, John Cervini – assistant engineers
- Jon Drenning – artistic direction
