= Jon Drenning =

American musician and songwriter

- Born: Jon William Drenning; April 5, 1965; Jacksonville, Florida, U.S.
- Genres: Heavy metal, progressive metal
- Occupations: Musician, songwriter
- Instrument: Guitar
- Years active: 1983–present
- Labels: Roadrunner, MCA, Atlantic, Spitfire, Paradigm Records, Quadra Records

Jon William Drenning (born April 5, 1965) is an American musician and songwriter best known for being the lead guitarist of Crimson Glory. He is also known for his work in the bands Crush and Erotic Liquid Culture.

== Biography ==
=== Crimson Glory ===
In 1979, guitarist Ben Jackson and drummer Dana Burnell co-founded the band Pierced Arrow, which was later renamed Beowulf. This band underwent multiple lineup changes before they were later joined by Drenning, bassist Jeff Lords, and finally vocalist John Patrick McDonald, Jr., who would become professionally known as Midnight, and settled on the name Crimson Glory in 1983.

Since their inception, Crimson Glory have released four studio albums with Drenning and Lords being the only members to appear on each one; Drenning would also serve as the sole guitarist on their third album Strange and Beautiful. Other studio members have been drummer Ravi Jahkotia and vocalist Wade Black, who appeared respectively on Strange and Beautiful and Astronomica. The original lineup eventually reunited in March 2005 with tentative plans for recording a fifth album. However, Midnight died in 2009 at the age of 47 from a stomach aneurysm.

In 2010, Crimson Glory reemerged with new vocalist Todd La Torre and tentative plans for a fifth album. The band toured for three years before La Torre parted ways with the band to join Queensrÿche, putting the band on hiatus again.

=== Other musical projects ===
When Crimson Glory first went on hiatus after a brief tour in support of Strange and Beautiful with vocalist David VanLanding filling in for Midnight, Drenning along with Lords and Jahkotia formed the short-lived projects Crush (with vocalist Billy Martinez) and Erotic Liquid Culture (with VanLanding), releasing one label-supported, self-titled album for each project.

=== Equipment ===
Drenning is a long time user of Jackson guitars, normally favoring the Rhoads model. He also uses other guitars, most notably a Gibson Les Paul Gold Top.

== Personal life ==
Drenning and his ex-wife Danae Saree have a son and an adopted daughter.

In 2005, while playing in Crush, Drenning pursued a career as football journalist, mentored by senior ESPN NFL analyst and College and Pro Football News Weekly editor Frank Ross and appearing occasionally on ESPN2.

In April 2014, Drenning was arrested on charges of conspiracy to purchase cocaine and use of a two-way communication device to facilitate a felony.

== Discography ==
Crimson Glory

→ See Crimson Glory discography

With Crush

- Crush (1994) (cassette only, not on label)
- Crush (1995)

With Erotic Liquid Culture

- Erotic Liquid Culture (1996)
