= Seven Kingdoms (album) =

Studio album by Seven Kingdoms
- Released: July 13, 2010
- Recorded: July-September 2009
- Genres: Heavy metal; power metal
- Length: 56:21
- Label: Nightmare
- Producer: Jim Morris

Seven Kingdoms chronology
Brothers of the Night (2007)	Seven Kingdoms (2010)	The Fire Is Mine (2012)

Professional ratings
Review scores
Source	Rating
Dangerdog	4.5/5
Femme Metal	95/100
Metal Express Radio	8/10
Sonic Cathedral	9/10

Seven Kingdoms is the self-titled second studio album by American power metal band Seven Kingdoms, released on July 13, 2010. The album has been noted to display "Seven Kingdoms' explosive brand of power metal with strokes of death, thrash, and progressive metal instead of the usual symphonic" trends", though the thrash/death metal influences have become less prominent than in their 2007 debut album Brothers of the Night.

Recording for Seven Kingdoms began in July 2009 at Morrisound Studios, containing 11 songs (including the intro) and featuring an appearance by Crimson Glory/Leatherwolf singer Wade Black in the title track. It is their first album with vocalist Sabrina Valentine, and their only album with bassist Miles Neff who was replaced by Aaron Sluss.

== Track listing ==
No.	Title	Length
1.	"Prelude"	1:17
2.	"Somewhere Far Away"	4:41
3.	"The Ones Who Breathe the Flame"	5:11
4.	"Open the Gates"	6:30
5.	"Vengeance by the Sons of a King"	6:06
6.	"Wolf in Sheep's Clothes"	4:28
7.	"A Murder Never Dead"	4:03
8.	"Into the Darkness"	6:03
9.	"Eyes to the North"	4:28
10.	"Thunder of the Hammer"	4:44
11.	"Seven Kingdoms" (featuring Wade Black)	8:50

== Personnel ==
- Sabrina Valentine – vocals
- Camden Cruz – guitars
- Kevin Byrd – guitars
- Miles Neff – bass
- Keith Byrd – drums
