= Ion Vein =

American heavy metal band (formed 1995)

- Origin: Chicago, Illinois
- Genres: Heavy Metal; Progressive metal Thrash metal Power Metal
- Years active: 1995–present
- Labels: Majesphere Records; Now&Then Records UK; Mortal Music
- Members: Scott Featherstone; Chris Lotesto; Rich Knight; Rob Such; Chuck White
- Past members: Dan Charatin; John Ashe; Mike Holewinski; Russ Klimczak; Scott Lang; John Malufka; Brian Rossin; Brian Gordon; Jonathon Quigley; Andrew Bunk; Allen James
- Website: ionvein.com.com

Ion Vein is an American heavy metal band from Chicago, Illinois, formed in 1995.

Founded by guitarist Chris Lotesto formerly of Latent Fury, Ion Vein has released three studio albums, two digital EPs, and appeared on several tribute and compilation albums. Producer Neil Kernon, produced/engineered/mixed their second album Reigning Memories and third album Ion Vein.

Ion Vein's first two albums have been described as prog/power metal.

== History ==
=== Early years (1995–1998) ===
Originally formed in 1989, as Latent Fury, by lead guitarist Chris Lotesto, the band released a self-titled three-song demo in 1991, dubbed “legendary” by many European fans, before lineup changes resulted in that era coming to an end along with the necessity of a name change in 1994. Lotesto, along with remaining Latent Fury members, John Ashe, Dan Charatin, and Mike Holewinski, pressed on as Ion Vein, a name Ashe came up with to describe what the effect the band wanted their music to have on fans, for most of 1995 before various circumstances led Lotesto to re-group and re-form the band under the same moniker at the end of that year.

Enter vocalist, Russ Klimczak, a high school friend of Lotesto's, and member of another popular southside Chicago band called Counter Attak. The two admired each other's work for quite some time and talked of joining forces several times during '95 as Counter Attak had broken up earlier that year. The start of 1996 saw Klimczak and Lotesto paired up for what would be the true beginning of Ion Vein as a band. Lotesto already had most of the songs written for what would become the debut album, Beyond Tomorrow, when he and Klimczak started working together, so when he answered an ad for a drummer in a local music paper in March, Scott Lang entered the fold and the three were off to find the remaining pieces of the puzzle.

A year-long search briefly brought Klimczak's old band mates, rhythm guitarist John Malufka, and bassist, Brian Rossin, into the fold, at the start of 1997, to record the Promo Sampler 1997 limited release containing the songs "Reflections Unclear" and "The Bridge of Dawn". The timing wasn't right for Malufka and Rossin to remain in the band and so the search for a permanent bassist and second guitarist continued. Finally, in September, as luck would have it, the same paper that yielded Lang would once again bring Ion Vein another strong player in bassist, Brian Gordon. The band forged on for another month as a four piece when upon returning from vacation, Lotesto was surprised to see Malufka at rehearsal with all of his gear plugged in and ready to go. Klimczak was able to finally talk his childhood best friend, and high school mate of both he and Lotesto, into coming out of his self-imposed hiatus to join Ion Vein full-time. Ion Vein was officially "born," and rolling with a full head of steam, playing their first show together in November 1997.

=== Beyond Tomorrow (1998–2002) ===
After hitting the Chicago club circuit in November, the band honed its skills on stage before the recording of Beyond Tomorrow was to begin in the summer of 1998. The band caught a break and were asked to perform at Powermad, an up-and-coming underground prog/power metal festival in Baltimore, Maryland, in August 1998, where they walked in completely unknown, and walked out with a very strong buzz in the metal underground after "blowing the roof off the place" as many in attendance proclaimed. The experience at Powermad was quite an eye-opener and the band realized that their debut album needed to be stronger than it currently was, so they decided to take it to another studio to remix and remaster it before releasing it.

A few offers from small record labels rolled in, but the band decided it was in their best interest to release Beyond Tomorrow on their label, Majesphere Records, to help generate enough buzz independently in hopes of landing a deal on a grander scale. The album was released in February 1999, and while getting a lot of positive press worldwide, it failed to attract a larger label that could help propel the band to the next level.

In the meantime, however, Ion Vein did attract the attention of Dwell Records, best known for their internationally distributed tribute albums, and songs were contributed to their Iron Maiden, Ozzy, Dio, King Diamond, and Queensrÿche tribute albums between 1998 and 2000, further garnering the band fans and critical acclaim around the world.

In March 2000, Gordon announced his departure and was replaced with Jonathon Quigley in July of that year. Quigley proved to be a strong writer and made an immediate impact during the writing sessions for the next album.

Other key moments during this period included opening for Armored Saint, Flotsam and Jetsam, Iced Earth, Nevermore, and Angra; appearances at Chicago Powerfest, and ProgPower USA; and being named to the "Top 5 New Bands of 1998" and "Top 5 local albums 1999" in the Midwest Beat Magazine's reader's poll, and "Best Metal Band 1999" in Chicago's Suburban Nitelife Magazine reader's poll.

=== Reigning Memories (2002–2006) ===
Realizing their sophomore album had to be something really special, Lotesto contacted Grammy winning producer, Neil Kernon (Queensrÿche, Judas Priest, Nevermore, Hall & Oates, etc.), who agreed to produce, engineer, and mix the new album. The sessions for Reigning Memories began in July 2001 but were plagued by a variety of technical and scheduling problems that lead to drastic delays and frustration. During the sessions, the band parted with Quigley in November 2002 and Gordon was brought in the studio to redo all the bass tracks. The album was mixed in December, mastered in March, and released as a 'US only' limited release in May 2003 on Majesphere Records, as the band continued to shop for a larger label home.

While strong reviews and press continued to pour in, the prospects for major indie record deal seemed to drift further and further away so the band decided to release the album worldwide via Majesphere in September 2003. Shortly thereafter, the band parted ways with drummer, Scott Lang, in October 2003 and replaced him with Chuck White (ex-Michael Angelo Batio, Winterkill, Spirit Web) in December 2003. Additionally, Andy Bunk (ex-Braindance), who joined Ion Vein on bass in December 2002, announced his departure in November 2003, and rhythm guitarist, John Malufka, announced his retirement from being an active musician in February 2004. Gordon returned to the fold on bass as a full-time member once again in September 2004 and the band continued as a four piece with Andy Parades (ex-Talamasca) temporarily filling in on rhythm guitar when possible for live dates.

During this period of turmoil, however, Ion Vein was approached by a few overseas labels that took a very keen interest in how Reigning Memories was developing in the European market. After some very positive discussions, the band decided to sign with the UK's Now & Then Records, whom, at the time, had a very good reputation in the industry, in May 2004 for a full scale release of Reigning Memories throughout the Europe and Far East markets. Frustrations began to set in as Now & Then sat on the album for a full year before finally releasing it in April 2005 and communication with the label became quite difficult and eventually non-existent. The band released a statement in March 2006 proclaiming their official parting of ways with Now & Then and continued moving forward.

This period of turmoil and evolution was not quite finished yet, however, and to the surprise of many, the band announced the parting of ways with vocalist, Russ Klimczak, in May 2006, thus closing the first chapter of the Ion Vein story after a solid 10-year run.

Other key moments during this period included opening for Overkill, King's X, Metal Church, Trouble, Loudness, Symphony X, Sonata Arctica, and Seven Witches; appearance at the Brave Words, Bloody Knuckles fest in Cleveland, Ohio, and Louder, Harder, Faster fest in Allentown, Pennsylvania; and having Reigning Memories named in the "Top 10 Local Albums of 2003" (#7) by the Northwest Indiana Times, and reviewed by Greg Kot in the Chicago Tribune.

=== New album and rebuilding (2006–2011) ===
With the basic tracks for their third album complete by late summer 2006, Ion Vein was now faced with the arduous task of finding a new vocalist that not only could complement the more focused, in-your-face heaviness of the new album, but elevate the band beyond anything they had achieved up to this point. The band pressed on for 18 months, holding countless auditions, and regular weekly rehearsals, with only the belief in the strength of the new material to help them carry them onward.

In late August 2007, Allen James joined the fold, and the band spent the rest of the year demoing and refining vocal tracks, before getting back in the studio with Kernon in December/January. Four tracks were mixed for shopping to labels, and Ion Vein finally returned to the stage in full form at Chicago Powerfest 2008, appearing once again, with Iced Earth to a packed house. The band finished recording and mixing the album, and continued a very strong run of live dates in the Chicago area, but was forced to bring their newfound momentum to a grinding halt at the end of 2009, parting ways with James, and Gordon, due to irreconcilable differences.

Ion Vein kicked off 2010 with a renewed energy, and as luck, or fate, would have it, Lotesto got an email at the beginning of February from, vocalist, Scott Featherstone (Enertia, ex-Attica USA), whom he had known, and been a big fan of since Ion Vein and Enertia first began playing shows together in early 2000. Lotesto promptly sent three tracks from Enertia's, Kernon produced, Force album, to White, and he immediately knew as well, that Featherstone was exactly what Ion Vein needed.

Upstate New York based, Featherstone, started recording vocal demos to the finished basic tracks in his home studio in March, and after making his way out to Chicago for their first live pre-production rehearsal in September, was ready to return in November to start tracking with Kernon.

As of early 2011, the band was very excited about the recordings and looking forward to finishing up the album so they can get back out on the road. Rob Such (Twelfth Gate, ex-Syris) joined the fold on bass in the summer of 2011 thus rounding out the line-up.

=== IV v1.0 (2011–2012) ===
Things took quite a bit longer than planned but after partnering with Chicago-based Mortal Music, the band released a three song DR (digital release) on September 27, containing the three tracks “Enough,” “Love/Hate,” and “Anger Inside,” to very positive reviews.

The DR concept was developed by Mortal Music as taking a snap shot of an album of music and releasing it into the market a "chapter" at a time, so to speak, to allow it to work its way into the marketplace faster and to help alleviate the musical overload fans and press alike are experiencing these days with so many options available. The full-length album will then be available on CD at the end of the cycle for those that still collect physical product.

The band finally returned to the stage on February 10, 2012 supporting the mighty Testament (band), and plans for releasing the next DR, and touring, are currently underway.

=== IV v2.0 (2012–2014) ===
Ion Vein released their second three song DR (digital release) on 12-10-12 which features the tracks “Seamless (Take Me Away),” “Fool’s Parade,” and “This Is Me” to more favorable reviews, further cementing their path in the metal community with the new line-up.

In September 2012, the band shared the stage with prog metal band, Symphony X, allowing them to debut the IV v2.0 songs to a live audience before the December release and in hopeful preparation for a tour.

While a tour never materialized in 2013, a headlining show at Chicago's infamous Metro Chicago in February and support slot for prog metal legends Fates Warning (who were very influential in the early years of the IV) served to be significant highlights for the year as recording of the new album was being wrapped up.

=== Ion Vein (2014) ===
Mixing for their long-awaited, self-titled third album began in January and it was released on July 4 in Europe, and July 8 in North America. The album contains 12 songs which include re-mixed/re-mastered versions of the IV v1.0 and IV v2.0 releases. This marked the band's first album since 2003's Reigning Memories.

=== Beyond Tomorrow (re-mastered) plus Latent Fury Demo 1991/unreleased live tracks (2018) ===
In collaboration with Greece's Arkeyn Steel Records, a combination release was put together to celebrate the very early years of guitarist, Chris Lotesto's, beginnings in Latent Fury and the transformation into Ion Vein. The CD release was limited to 500 hand-numbered copies and featured the three studio songs from the classic 1991 cassette demo, titled "Latent Fury," along with six unreleased live tracks plus the long out-of-print Ion Vein debut album, Beyond Tomorrow, in re-mastered form. The 12 page glossy booklet features many never before seen photographs/memorabilia and the release was made available for digital download in May 2019.

== Band members ==
Current members

- Scott Featherstone – lead vocals (2010–present)
- Chris Lotesto – lead guitar, backing vocals (1995–present)
- Rich Knight – rhythm guitar (2012–present)
- Rob Such – bass (2011–present)
- Chuck White – drums, percussion (2003–present)

Former members

- Dan Charatin – rhythm guitar, backing vocals (1995)
- John Ashe – drums, percussion, backing vocals (1995)
- Mike Holewinski – bass (1995)
- Russ Klimczak – lead vocals (1996–2006)
- Scott Lang – drums, percussion (1996–2003)
- John Malufka – rhythm guitar (1997–2004)
- Brian Rossin – bass (1997)
- Brian Gordon – bass, backing vocals (1997–2000, 2004–2009)
- Jonathon Quigley – bass, backing vocals (2000–2001)
- Andrew Bunk – bass, backing vocals (2002–2003)
- Allen James – lead vocals (2007–2009)

== Discography ==
=== Digital Releases (DRs) ===
- IV v1.0 (2011, Majesphere Records/Mortal-Music)
- IV v2.0 (2012, Majesphere Records/Mortal-Music)

=== Studio albums ===
- Beyond Tomorrow (1999, Majesphere Records)
- Reigning Memories (2003, Majesphere Records; 2005, Now & Then Records UK)
- Ion Vein (2014, Majesphere Records/Mortal-Music)
- Demo 1991/Beyond Tomorrow (re-mastered) (2018, Arkeyn Steel Records)

=== Other Studio Releases ===
- Demo '97 (1997)
- Demo '99 (1999)

=== Tributes & Compilations ===
- Powermad Sampler 1998 - Track: Beyond Tomorrow (1998, Global Connections Records)
- A Call To Irons 2: Tribute to Iron Maiden - Track: Killers (1998, Dwell Records)
- Awaken the Demon: Tribute to Dio - Track: Don't Talk to Strangers (1999, Dwell Records)
- Powermad Sampler 1999 - Track: Bridge of Dawn (1999, Global Connections Records)
- Powerquest: The Awakening - Track: Fading Shadows (1999, KMI Records)
- Land of the Wizard: Tribute to Ozzy - Track: Mr. Crowley (2000, Dwell Records)
- Church of the Devil: Tribute to King Diamond - Track: Victimized (2000, Dwell Records)
- Rebellion: Tribute to Queensryche - Track: Take Hold of the Flame (2001, Dwell Records)
- A Call to Irons 1&2 – A tribute to Iron Maiden Volumes 1 & 2 - Track: Killers (2002, Dwell Records)
- ProgPower USA IV Showcase Sampler - Track: Faith and Majesty (2003, Metal Ages Media)
- Madmen of Ozzy – A tribute to Ozzy Osbourne - Track: Mr. Crowley (2007, Crimson Mask Records)
