= DJ Ravidrums =

- Born: Ravi Jakhotia; October 9, 1968 (age 57); New York City, United States
- Genres: House, dance, funk, rock
- Occupations: Dj, drummer
- Instruments: Drums, percussion, keyboards, turntables, vocals
- Label: Hitskope Records
- Formerly of: Crimson Glory; The Last Goodnight
- Website: ravidrums.com

Ravi Jakhotia (born October 9, 1968), also known by his stage name DJ Ravidrums, is an American electronic music artist DJ and drummer. He was the music director and drummer on the 2009 NBC TV series Howie Do It and 2011 CBS TV series Live to Dance. He performed at the Oscars in 2009 for Slumdog Millionaire, at the Mariah Carey Infinity Las Vegas show as a special guest in 2015, and Super Bowl pre-game amongst numerous other shows.

== Career details ==
In 2002, he appeared in the Episode 5 of Dog Eat Dog hosted by Brooke Burns. He was not the top dog, but he and his teammates won the final trivia and split the total grand prize of $25,000.00.

=== As Ravi Jakhotia ===
In 1991, Jakhotia replaced Dana Burnell as the drummer for the progressive metal band Crimson Glory. Following the departure of vocalist Midnight, the remaining Crimson Glory members (Jakhotia, Jon Drenning and Jeff Lords) moved to Arizona in 1995, forming the band Crush with vocalist Billy Martinez and releasing one album under that moniker. They later replaced Martinez with former Michael Schenker singer, David Van Landing (who also toured with Crimson Glory after Midnight left) and changed their name to Erotic Liquid Culture. ELC would release a self-titled album in 1996 on Quadra Records before disbanding.

In 2007, Jakhotia was drummer for the alternative rock band The Last Goodnight and appeared on the album Poison Kiss.

=== As DJ Ravidrums ===
Ravidrums was the first Indian American music director of an American TV series. Howie Mandel discovered Drums performing in the 2008 Super Bowl pregame show. Drums is also credited with inventing the process of live drum playing while re-mixing.

Drums has served as personal DJ for Hugh Hefner, appeared in a Gap commercial, and played a small role in The Matrix Reloaded.

Ravidrums appeared on the Nintendo E3 2008 Press Conference where he performed on stage to promote the then-upcoming game, Wii Music.

He performed at the 2009 Oscars when two nominated songs came from Slumdog Millionaire. He has performed with Paula Abdul, Ricky Martin, Will Smith and The Black Eyed Peas. Events where he appeared included the HBO Emmy after party, Fashion Week in New York City and Los Angeles, and a Michael Jordan party. His musical styles include house, dance, funk, rock, Latin, Brazilian, reggae, Reggaeton, swing and hip-hop.

One day before Donald Trump's presidential inauguration, Ravidrums performed at the Make America Great! Welcome Celebration concert at Lincoln Memorial on January 19, 2017.

== Personal life ==
Jakhotia was born in New York City in 1968. He attended Chamberlain High School in Tampa, Florida and graduated in 1986. He is married and lives in Santa Ana, Orange County.
