= The Square (EP) =

EP by Seven Kingdoms
- Released: November 8, 2024
- Recorded: 2024
- Genres: Thrash metal; power metal
- Length: 19:46
- Label: Reigning Phoenix
- Producer: Jim Morris

Seven Kingdoms chronology
Zenith (2022)	The Square (2024)	Sono Sola (2027)

Singles from Zenith
- 1. "The Square" Released: September 24, 2024; 2. "Through These Waves" Released: October 12, 2024; 3. "Wilted Pieces" Released: November 9, 2024; 4. "Kyrie" Released: December 18, 2024; 5. "The Serpent and the Lotus" Released: January 29, 2025

Professional ratings
Review scores
Source	Rating
Dead Rhetoric	9/10
Metal Express Radio	8.1/10
Rock Hard	7/10

The Square is an EP by American power metal band Seven Kingdoms. It was released on November 8, 2024, through Reigning Phoenix Music. Music videos were released for every track on the EP, including the title track, "Through These Waves", a cover of the Mr. Mister single "Kyrie", and "The Serpent And The Lotus".

"Wilted Pieces" was described to have "an 80's inspired sound with an anthem like quality that may speak to someone with a broken heart searching for healing and understanding on a deeper level. Often times we find ourselves searching for the experience of love outside of ourselves, while never truly learning how to be a source of love for ourselves. Learning to listen to that little voice inside us rather than disregarding it for the sake of a temporary feeling. Knowing that though our eyes can deceive us, our hearts will never lie. Remembering that just because someone didn't love you, doesn't mean no one ever will." "Kyrie" features a synth part performed by producer Jim Morris.

== Track listing ==
No.	Title	Length
1.	"The Square"	4:12
2.	"Through These Waves"	3:32
3.	"Wilted Pieces"	3:44
4.	"The Serpent and the Lotus"	4:03
5.	"Kyrie" (Mr. Mister cover) (featuring Jim Morris on synths))	4:15
Total length:		19:46

== Personnel ==
- Sabrina Valentine – vocals
- Camden Cruz – guitars, bass
- Kevin Byrd – guitars
- Keith Byrd – drums
