= Jeff Lords =

American musician

- Genres: Heavy metal, progressive metal
- Occupations: Musician, songwriter
- Instrument: Bass
- Years active: 1983–present
- Labels: Roadrunner, MCA, Atlantic, Spitfire, Paradigm Records, Quadra Records

Jeff Lords is an American musician best known for being the bassist and sole constant member of Crimson Glory. He is also known for his work in the bands Crush and Erotic Liquid Culture, and currently in the band Dark Matter.

== Career ==
=== Crimson Glory ===
In 1979, guitarist Ben Jackson and drummer Dana Burnell co-founded the band Pierced Arrow, which was later renamed Beowulf. This band underwent multiple lineup changes before they were later joined by Lords, guitarist Jon Drenning, and finally vocalist John Patrick McDonald, Jr., who would become professionally known as Midnight, and settled on the name Crimson Glory in 1983.

Since their inception, Crimson Glory have released four studio albums with Lords and Drenning being the only members to appear on each one. Other studio members have been drummer Ravi Jahkotia and vocalist Wade Black, who appeared respectively on Strange and Beautiful and Astronomica. The original lineup eventually reunited in March 2005 with tentative plans for recording a fifth album. However, Midnight died at the age of 47 from a stomach aneurysm.

In 2010, Crimson Glory reemerged with new vocalist Todd La Torre and tentative plans for a fifth album. The band toured for three years before La Torre parted ways with the band to join Queensrÿche, putting the band on hiatus again.

=== Other musical projects ===
When Crimson Glory first went on hiatus after a brief tour in support of Strange and Beautiful with vocalist David VanLanding filling in for Midnight, Lords along with Drenning and Jahkotia formed the short-lived projects Crush (with vocalist Billy Martinez) and Erotic Liquid Culture (with VanLanding), releasing one label-supported, self-titled release under each moniker.

Since the early 2010s, Lords has played bass in his current project Dark Matter whose other members have been vocalist Paul Beach, lead guitarist Terry Schambers, drummer Jesse Rojas, and, for a brief spell, rhythm guitarist Chris Baylor. So far, this band has released two full-length albums: Terminal Endeavor, and Encipher; the latter features guest vocals by Todd La Torre on four tracks. With the addition of drummer G.J. Gosman and keyboardist John Beach, Dark Matter later morphed into Gods of Centaurus and released another pair of albums under that moniker: Gods of Centaurus and Volition.

== Discography ==
With Crimson Glory

→ See Crimson Glory discography

With Crush

- Crush (1994) (cassette only)
- Crush (1995)

With Erotic Liquid Culture

- Erotic Liquid Culture (1996)

With Dark Matter

- Terminal Endeavor (2012)
- Encipher (2016)

With Gods of Centaurus

- Gods of Centaurus (2022)
- Volition (2025)

Other appearances

Year	Title	Artist	Track(s)
2001	Here I Come	Ben Jackson	Bass on "The Bomb"
