= Zenith (Seven Kingdoms album) =

Studio album by Seven Kingdoms
- Released: June 17, 2022
- Recorded: June-November 2021
- Genres: Thrash metal; power metal; heavy metal
- Length: 43:43
- Label: Distortion Music
- Producer: Jim Morris

Seven Kingdoms chronology
| Decennium (2017) | Zenith (2022) | The Square (2024) |

Singles from Zenith
- 1. "I Hate Myself for Loving You" Released: February 8, 2022; 2. "Universal Terrestrial" Released: April 9, 2022; 3. "Diamond Handed" Released: May 6, 2022

Professional ratings
Review scores
| Source | Rating |
|---|---|
| Metal Storm | 7.1/10 |
| My Global Mind | 9/10 |
| Sonic Perspectives | 8.1/10 |

Zenith is the fifth studio album by American power metal band Seven Kingdoms, released on June 17, 2022, via Distortion Music Group. It was recorded, mixed, and mastered at Morrisound Recording, with cover art by Jan Yrlund, known for his work for Battle Beast, Korpiklaani, and Wind Rose. The album includes three songs that were originally recorded and released for their 2019 EP Empty Eyes.

== Track listing ==
| No. | Title | Length |
|---|---|---|
| 1. | "Diamond Handed" | 4:04 |
| 2. | "A Silent Remedy" | 4:02 |
| 3. | "Love Dagger" | 3:11 |
| 4. | "Chasing the Mirage" | 4:25 |
| 5. | "Valonqar" | 4:15 |
| 6. | "Empty Eyes" | 3:50 |
| 7. | "Magic in the Mist" | 3:56 |
| 8. | "Universal Terrestrial" | 3:43 |
| 9. | "The Water Dance" | 5:01 |
| 10. | "Life Signs" | 3:30 |
| 11. | "I Hate Myself for Loving You" (Joan Jett and the Blackhearts cover) | 3:46 |

== Personnel ==
- Sabrina Valentine – vocals
- Camden Cruz – guitars, bass
- Kevin Byrd – guitars
- Keith Byrd – drums
