= Illusion Suite =

Norwegian heavy metal band from Oslo

Illusion Suite is a progressive metal-band from Oslo, Norway. The band was established in 2003 and in 2009, their debut album Final Hour was released. The album was mixed and mastered at Basement Studios in Germany. They performed at ProgPower USA 2010 in Atlanta, USA.

== Discography ==
- 2004: Demo One (4-track demo)
- 2005: The Adventures of Arcan (5-track EP)
- 2009: Final Hour (Limb Music/Tuba Records)
- 2013: The Iron Cemetery (POWER PROG)

== Members ==
- Bill Makatowicz – vocals
- Kim "Jacobsen" Silseth – guitars
- Roger Bjørge – drums
- Dag Erik Johnsen – bass guitar

Former members

- Øyvind Larsen – guitar
- Ketil Ronold – keyboards
