= Howie Do It =

2009 Canadian TV series

- Starring: Howie Mandel; DJ Ravidrums
- Opening theme: "This Is How We Do It" by Montell Jordan (Remixed by DJ Ravidrums)
- Countries of origin: Canada; United States
- Original language: English
- No. of seasons: 1
- No. of episodes: 20

Production
- Executive producers: Howie Mandel; Morgan Elliott; Scott Hallock; Kevin Healey
- Production locations: Caesars Windsor; Windsor, Ontario
- Running time: 30 minutes
- Production companies: 3 Arts Entertainment; Alevy Productions; Hallock-Healey Entertainment; Suddenly Seemore Productions; CanWest Media; HDI Productions

Original release
- Network: Global; NBC
- Release: January 9 – May 1, 2009

Howie Do It is a comedy television series, co-commissioned by Global and NBC, that stars Howie Mandel and DJ Ravidrums. The series features practical jokes in the vein of earlier shows like Just for Laughs Gags, Punk'd or Candid Camera – the supposed twist being that the cameras are in the open, not hidden as in the other series. Mandel appears, often incognito, in several of the jokes. After the big reveal, either Howie or one of his assistants then delivers the line "This is Howie Do It!" The theme song to the show is a remix of "This Is How We Do It" by Montell Jordan, remixed by DJ Ravidrums. The show premiered on NBC and Global TV on January 9, 2009.

Mandel also served as an executive producer of the series, along with Scott Hallock and Kevin Healy of Spy TV, and Morgan Elliot and Michael Rotenberg. Six episodes were ordered. The studio segments were filmed at Caesars Windsor in Windsor, Ontario on August 24, 25, and 26, 2008. Tickets to the tapings were given out to new members of Harrah's Total Rewards program at the casino. The head of NBC's unscripted department, Craig Plestis, said that NBC's choice to share the costs of the series with Global was part of "trying to figure out new ways to do business as shows become more expensive."

== U.S. Nielsen ratings ==
Episode number	Episode	Rating	Share	Rating/Share (18-49)	Viewers (millions)	Rank (Overall)
1	"Pilot/102"	4.7	7	2.1/7	7.68	66
2	"103/104"	3.5	6	1.8/6	6.06	115
3	"105/106"	3.4	6	1.6/6	5.54	132
4	"107/108"	3.3	5	1.5/5	5.24	141
5	"109"	3.0	4	1.3/4	4.69	190
6	"110"	2.5	4	1.2/4	4.08	267
7	"111"	2.6	5	1.1/4	3.97	289
8	"112"	2.7	5	1.3/5	4.56	199
9	"113"	2.4	5	TBA	4.03	277
10	"114"	2.5	5	1.3/5	3.89	318
11	"115"	2.5	4	1.0/4	3.20	408
12	"116"	2.1	4	1.0/4	3.11	700
13	"117"	2.1	4	1.1/4	3.06	509
14	"118"	1.9	3	1.0/3	2.47	831
15	"119"	2.0	4	0.9/3	3.34	TBA
16	"Finale"	2.2	4	1.7/4	3.29	832
