= Ben Jackson (musician) =

American musician and songwriter (born 1963)

- Born: Benjamin Donald Jackson; July 17, 1963 (age 62)
- Genres: Heavy metal, progressive metal
- Occupations: Musician, songwriter
- Instruments: Guitar, vocals, bass
- Years active: 1979–present
- Labels: Roadrunner, MCA, Spitfire

Benjamin Donald Jackson is an American musician and songwriter best known for being the rhythm guitarist of Crimson Glory. He is also known for his short-lived band Parish, and his solo career consisted of two albums Here I Come and All Over You, and his current project Avenging Benji.

== Biography ==
=== Crimson Glory ===
Ben Jackson co-founded the group that would eventually become known as Crimson Glory along with four other musicians, including drummer Dana Burnell, in Sarasota, Florida in 1979 under the name Pierced Arrow (later changed to 'Beowulf'). This group underwent multiple personnel changes before Jackson and Burnell were joined by the other three musicians who would compose the classic lineup of Crimson Glory - vocalist Midnight, lead guitarist Jon Drenning, and bassist Jeff Lords. Jackson and Burnell played on the albums Crimson Glory and Transcendence before leaving the group in 1989.

In 1999, Jackson reformed Crimson Glory with Drenning, Lords, and new vocalist Wade Black for the recording of their fourth album, Astronomica. The band toured over a one-year period in support of the album before going on a second hiatus.

In 2006, Jackson reunited with the original lineup of Crimson Glory as they performed sporadically for about a year until Midnight was arrested and charged for charged with driving under the influence, prompting the band to call on Wade Black to rejoin.

In 2010, Crimson Glory reemerged with new vocalist Todd La Torre and tentative plans for a fifth album. The band toured for three years before La Torre left the band, citing the band's inactivity and apparent lack of interest in writing. La Torre moved on to join Queensrÿche and Crimson Glory was on hiatus once more.

=== Other musical projects ===
After his first departure from Crimson Glory, Jackson went on to form the band Parish with vocalist John David, guitarist David Edward, bassist Mike Luther (later replaced by Bernard Hernandez), and then ex-Crimson Glory bandmate Dana Burnell on drums. Burnell co-wrote the songs that would appear on the band's 1995 debut album, Envision, but departed for family reasons during the recording sessions. He was replaced by Rich Tabor, who would finish the recording. Envision would be Parish's first and only album. Musically, the offering sounds much like Crimson Glory's Transcendence, but not vocally. In January 2018, 20th Century Music announced via their Facebook page that they would re-release Envision with a DVD and bonus material.

In 2001, Jackson released his solo debut, Here I Come, on which he took up lead vocals for the first time and played most of the guitar and bass parts; while his former Parish bandmate Rich Tabor contributed drums. In 2005, he released his sophomore effort, All Over You, under the name "The Ben Jackson Group". He described the album as "more of a band effort with the result being more heavy metal in style." The other musicians on this album are guitarist Mark Borgmeyer, bassist Danny Binz, Tabor on drums, and backing vocalist Rose Marie Sexton. Keith Bergman of Blabbermouth.net gave the album a 5/10 rating and concluded his review by writing, "Bump the rating up one point if you can name every ex-member of Royal Hunt, and two if you've ever had anything autographed by Ted Poley."

In 2008, Jackson announced he was announced that he was putting the finishing touches on his third solo album, Gold and Dragons. This album was officially released two years later under a new band name, “Avenging Benji”. The band quietly released a very limited edition four song EP, Out for Blood, in 2016. In 2019, they announced they were planning to release a second full-length album entitled, Love Angel Sex Devil, adding vocalist Wade Black (ex-Crimson Glory) to the line-up.

== Discography ==
With Crimson Glory

Year	Title
1986	Crimson Glory
1988	Transcendence
1999	Astronomica
2026	Chasing the Hydra

With Parish

Year	Title
1995	Envision

Solo

Year	Title
2001	Here I Come

With The Ben Jackson Group

Year	Title
2005	All Over You

With Avenging Benji

Year	Title
2010	Gold and Dragons
2016	Out for Blood (EP)

Guest appearances

Year	Album	Artist	Track(s)
2005	Sakada	Midnight	Bass on "Berber Trails"
