= Decennium =

Studio album by Seven Kingdoms
- Released: March 17, 2017
- Recorded: June-July 2016
- Genres: Symphonic metal; power metal; speed metal; thrash metal
- Length: 51:37
- Label: Napalm
- Producer: Jim Morris

Seven Kingdoms chronology
The Fire Is Mine (2012)	Decennium (2017)	Zenith (2022)

Professional ratings
Review scores
Source	Rating
Dangerdog	4/5
Ghost Cult Magazine	7.5/10
Metal Hammer	4/7
Metal.de	8/10
My Global Mind	8/10
Rock Hard	6/10

Decennium is the fourth studio album by American power metal band Seven Kingdoms, released on March 17, 2017.

== Track listing ==
No.	Title	Length
1.	"Stargazer"	5:09
2.	"Undying"	5:11
3.	"In the Walls"	4:52
4.	"The Tale of Deathface Ginny"	4:55
5.	"Castles in the Snow"	5:09
6.	"Kingslayer"	5:56
7.	"The Faceless Hero"	4:19
8.	"Neverending"	5:45
9.	"Hollow"	4:49
10.	"Awakened from Nothing"	5:32

== Personnel ==
- Sabrina Valentine – vocals
- Camden Cruz – guitars
- Kevin Byrd – guitars
- Aaron Sluss – bass
- Keith Byrd – drums
