= The Fire Is Mine =

Studio album by Seven Kingdoms
- Released: October 9, 2012
- Recorded: May 2012
- Genres: Heavy metal; power metal; symphonic metal
- Length: 53:00
- Label: Nightmare
- Producer: Jim Morris

Seven Kingdoms chronology
Seven Kingdoms (2010)	The Fire Is Mine (2012)	Decennium (2017)

Professional ratings
Review scores
Source	Rating
Dangerdog	4.5/5
Femme Metal	97/100
Hard Rock Haven	9/10
Metal Express Radio	9.5/10
Metal Reviews	74/100
Metalholic	8.7/10
Powermetal.de	9/10
Sonic Cathedral	8/10

The Fire Is Mine is the third studio album by American power metal band Seven Kingdoms, released on October 9, 2012.

== Track listing ==
No.	Title	Length
1.	"Beyond the Wall"	1:17
2.	"After the Fall"	5:41
3.	"Forever Brave"	5:11
4.	"Flame of Olympus"	4:50
5.	"Symphony of Stars"	5:37
6.	"The Fire Is Mine"	5:38
7.	"Kardia"	4:56
8.	"Fragile Minds Collapse"	6:03
9.	"In the Twisted Twilight"	5:01
10.	"A Debt Paid in Steel"	0:56
11.	"The King in the North"	7:50

== Personnel ==
- Sabrina Valentine – vocals
- Camden Cruz – guitars
- Kevin Byrd – guitars
- Aaron Sluss – bass
- Keith Byrd – drums
