= Pictures of You (The Last Goodnight song) =

2007 single by the Last Goodnight

Single by the Last Goodnight

from the album Poison Kiss
- B-side: "Get Closer"
- Released: June 25, 2007
- Length: 3:10
- Label: VRA
- Songwriters: Jeff Blue, Kurtis John, Mike Nadeau
- Producer: Jeff Blue

The Last Goodnight singles chronology
"Pictures of You" (2007)	"Stay Beautiful" (2008)

"Pictures of You" is a song by American rock band the Last Goodnight. It was released in June 2007 as the first single from their debut album, Poison Kiss (2007). The song peaked at number 70 on the US Billboard Hot 100 chart and became a top-three hit in Australia and the Czech Republic. The song is certified platinum in Australia for shipping over 70,000 copies.

== Music video ==
"Pictures of You" was supported in a promo video directed by Marc Klasfeld. The video plays upon the song's title, mixing in various "pictures" to create the images and scenes which comprise the video. The same music video was being used by ABC Television and the Seven Network to promote the second season of Brothers & Sisters, but with scenes from the show mixed in.

== Track listings ==
European CD single

1. "Pictures of You" – 3:10
2. "Get Closer" – 3:26

European maxi-CD single

1. "Pictures of You" – 3:10
2. "Push Me Away" (album version) – 3:00
3. "When It All Comes Down" – 2:59
4. "Now That You're Gone" – 3:41
5. "Pictures of You" (instrumental) – 3:14

Australian CD single

1. "Pictures of You" – 3:10
2. "Get Closer" – 3:26
3. "Pictures of You" (video)

== Charts ==
=== Weekly charts ===
Chart (2007−2009)	Peak position
Australia (ARIA)	3
Austria (Ö3 Austria Top 40)	24
Canada (Canadian Hot 100)	32
Czech Republic Airplay (ČNS IFPI)	2
Germany (GfK)	25
Germany Airplay (BVMI)	5
Italy (FIMI)	34
Mexico Anglo (Monitor Latino)	1
Poland (Polish Airplay Charts)	4
Slovakia Airplay (ČNS IFPI)	76
Sweden (Sverigetopplistan)	15
Switzerland (Schweizer Hitparade)	76
US Billboard Hot 100	70
US Adult Top 40 (Billboard)	9
US Mainstream Top 40 (Billboard)	29
US Pop 100 (Billboard)	52

Chart (2022)	Peak position
Poland (Polish Airplay Top 100)	78

=== Year-end charts ===
Chart (2008)	Position
Australia (ARIA)	18
US Adult Top 40 (Billboard)	38

Chart (2009)	Position
Germany (Media Control GfK)	98

== Certifications ==
Region	Certification	Certified units/sales
Australia (ARIA)	Platinum	70,000^{^}
Germany (BVMI)	Gold	150,000^{‡}
^{^} Shipments figures based on certification alone.^{‡} Sales+streaming figures based on certification alone.

== Release history ==
Region	Date	Format(s)	Label	Ref.
United States	June 12, 2007	Digital download	Virgin	
United States	June 25, 2007	Hot adult contemporary radio	Virgin	
United States	June 26, 2007	Contemporary hit radio	Virgin	
Australia	January 21, 2008	CD single	EMI	
