= Astronomica (album) =

Studio album by Crimson Glory
- Released: August 10, 1999
- Studio: Dreamland, Anna Maria, Florida
- Genre: Progressive metal, heavy metal
- Length: 69:38
- Label: Spitfire (US); Rising Sun (Europe)
- Producer: Jon Drenning

Crimson Glory chronology
Strange and Beautiful (1991)	Astronomica (1999)

Professional ratings
Review scores
Source	Rating
AllMusic	4/5 stars
Collector's Guide to Heavy Metal	7/10

Astronomica is the fourth studio album by the American progressive metal band Crimson Glory, released in 1999 via Spitfire Records (USA) and Rising Sun (Europe). After a long hiatus following their less-than-successful album Strange and Beautiful, the band reformed with Wade Black on vocals and Steve Wacholz (of Savatage fame) on drums. Although he is pictured in the album artwork (with the intention of being the new drummer), Wacholz never actually played on the record – a drum machine was used. Wade Black's vocal delivery was not appreciated by all fans, who were accustomed to Midnight's voice. Still, the album was greeted as a successful comeback.

"March to Glory" is a re-interpretation of the tune "Boadicea", to be found on Enya by Irish singer and songwriter Enya, which was released in 1987 and re-released in 1992 bearing the title The Celts.

"Cydonia" contains a hidden track which includes 20:15 minutes of recorded police scanner communications that describe alleged U.F.O. sightings (on the 1999 Spitfire Records edition only).

== Track listings ==
All music by Jon Drenning and Jeff Lords – all lyrics by Billy Martinez and Jon Drenning except where noted.

Track listing
No.	Title	Writer(s)	Length
1.	"March to Glory" (Instrumental)		3:28
2.	"War of the Worlds"	Drenning, Lords	4:08
3.	"New World Machine"	Drenning, Lords, Martinez	4:14
4.	"Astronomica"		4:54
5.	"Edge of Forever"		5:47
6.	"Touch the Sun"		5:55
7.	"Lucifer's Hammer"	Drenning, Lords	4:25
8.	"The Other Side of Midnight"		4:29
9.	"Cyber-Christ"	Drenning, Lords	5:14
10.	"Cydonia"		5:47
Total length:			49:16

A special edition limited to 5000 was released with a second disc, featuring 3 live tracks with Midnight on vocals, recorded at Manatee Civic Center on September 2, 1989.

1. "Painted Skies" (Drenning, Lord, Midnight) – 7:10
2. "Queen of the Masquerade" (Drenning, Lord, Midnight) – 6:19
3. "Lost Reflection" (Drenning, Lord, Midnight) – 6:29

A limited edition remaster from 2008 on the Polish Metal Mind label expanded the second disc with further studio and live material:

1. "War of the Worlds" – remake
2. "Astronomica" – demo version
3. "Touch the Sun" – demo version
4. "Dragon Lady" – live
5. "Eternal World" – live
6. "Painted Skies" – 7:10
7. "Queen of the Masquerade" – 6:19
8. "Lost Reflection" – 6:29

== Personnel ==
- Wade Black – vocals
- Jon Drenning – guitars, producer, engineer, mixing
- Ben Jackson – guitars
- Jeff Lords – bass
- Steve Wachholz – credited as drummer, but did not play on album.

== Astronomica the band ==
In 2023, Black formed a band named Astronomica that included Luca Caracciolo on drums, Rich Marks on lead guitar, Kyle Sokol of Rude Squad on bass & former Avenging Benji bassist Ryan Bales now on rhythm guitar.
