= Sakada (Midnight album) =

Studio album by Midnight
- Released: September 27, 2005
- Studio: East Avenue Recording Studio, Sarasota, Florida
- Genre: Hard rock, Heavy metal
- Length: 48:52
- Label: Black Lotus Records
- Producer: Phil Anderson and Midnight

Midnight chronology
Sakada (2005)	M2: Descending into Madness (2014)

Professional ratings
Review scores
Source	Rating
Allmusic	2.5/5 stars
Brave Words & Bloody Knuckles	9/10
Metal Temple	6/10

Sakada is the first solo album by ex-Crimson Glory frontman Midnight.

== Track listing ==
Disc 1
No.	Title	Writer(s)	Length
1.	"Incubus"	Scott Gibson, Midnight, Phil Anderson	4:56
2.	"Berber Trails"	Midnight, Phil Anderson	6:19
3.	"Little Mary Sunshine"	Scott Gibson, Midnight, Phil Anderson	4:02
4.	"Miss Katie"	Phil Anderson, Midnight	6:20
5.	"War"	Phil Anderson, Scott Gibson, Midnight	4:38
6.	"Pain"	Midnight	5:46
7.	"Sakada"	Midnight, Ronny Czyrny, Gerd Woelk	6:07
8.	"Lost Boy"	Midnight, Phil Anderson, Scott Gibson	5:47
9.	"Cat Song"	Midnight, Phil Anderson, Scott Gibson	4:57

== Personnel ==
- Midnight - Vocals, acoustic guitar
- Scott Gibson - Electric guitars, bass, acoustic guitar
- Phil Anderson - Drums and percussion, washboard, maracas and hammered dulcimer
- Ben Jackson - Bass (Track 2)
- Matte Wuole - Electric guitar (Tracks 2, 3 & 8)
- Dave Talkovic - Bass (Tracks 5 & 8)
- Keith S. Coker - Flute (Track 9)
- Dave Steele - Banjo (Track 5)
- Ronny Czyrny - Acoustic guitar (Track 9)
- Gerd Woelk - Bass (Track 9)
