= Withem =

Withem is a surname. Notable people with the surname include:

- Ron Withem (1946–2020), American politician
- Shannon Withem (born 1972), American baseball player
