= Poison Kiss =

Studio album by The Last Goodnight
- Released: August 28, 2007
- Recorded: 2007
- Length: 41:51
- Label: Virgin
- Producer: Jeff Blue

Professional ratings
Review scores
| Source | Rating |
|---|---|
| AllMusic | 3.5/5 stars |
| Entertainment Weekly | B− |

Poison Kiss is the only studio album by American rock band The Last Goodnight. The album was released on August 28, 2007. After their 2008 tour, the band was dropped by Virgin, and disbanded shortly after.

== Track listing ==
1. "Poison Kiss" – 3:47
2. "Back Where We Belong" – 3:50
3. "Pictures of You" – 3:09
4. "Stay Beautiful" – 3:14
5. "This Is the Sound" – 3:18
6. "One Trust" – 3:55
7. "Return to Me" – 3:10
8. "Good Love" – 3:40
9. "If I Talk to God" – 3:36
10. "Push Me Away" – 3:00
11. "In Your Arms" – 3:31
12. "Incomplete" – 3:41

== Charts ==
| Chart (2007–2008) | Peak position |
|---|---|
| Australian Albums (ARIA) | 90 |
| Italian Albums (FIMI) | 75 |
| Polish Albums | 4 |
| US Heatseekers Albums (Billboard) | 5 |

== Release history ==
Release history and formats for Poison Kiss
| Region | Date | Format(s) | Label | Ref. |
|---|---|---|---|---|
| United States | August 28, 2007 | CD; digital download | Virgin | |
| Australia | February 11, 2008 | CD; digital download | EMI | |
