= The Last Goodnight =

American alternative rock and pop band

- Origin: Enfield, Connecticut, Connecticut, US
- Genres: Alternative rock, pop rock
- Years active: 2006–2008, 2023
- Labels: EMI/Virgin, producer: Jeff Blue
- Past members: Leif Christensen (Bass guitar, vocals); Kurtis John Henneberry (Vocals, piano); Mike Nadeau (Guitar); Ely Rise (Keyboards); Anton Yurack (Guitar, vocals); Max Hattem (Sitar); Larone "Skeeter" McMillan (Drums, percussion); Jeff Blue (Studio Drummer)
- Website: thelastgoodnight.net

The Last Goodnight is an American alternative rock/pop band from Enfield, Connecticut. Their major label debut, Poison Kiss, was released on 28 August 2007. The first single from the album, "Pictures of You", became a pop radio hit in the summer of 2007. After breaking up in 2008, the band returned after 15 years with two new singles, "Damn These Walls", which was released on December 1, 2023, and "Rockstars", which was released on January 26, 2024.

== History ==
In June 2005, the Enfield, Connecticut band, Renata, performed at the Whisky a Go Go in West Hollywood, California. The band caught the eye of RCA Records A&R Sr. VP, Jeff Blue. Blue left RCA to develop the band in his house for three years. Blue brought the band to Virgin Records and eventually produced the debut album which spawned the single "Pictures of You" and "Stay Beautiful" which was written by him, Henneberry, and Nadeau.

== Discography ==
=== Studio albums ===
Title	Details	Peak chart positions		
Title	Details	US Heat.	AUS	ITA
Poison Kiss	Released: August 28, 2007; Label: Virgin, EMI; Format: CD, digital download	5	90	75

=== Singles ===
Year	Title	Peak chart positions										Certifications	Album
Year	Title	US	US Adult	AUS	AUT	CAN	GER	ITA	POL	SWE	SWI	Certifications	Album
2007	"Pictures of You"	70	9	3	24	32	25	34	4	15	76	ARIA: Platinum; BVMI: Gold	Poison Kiss
2008	"Stay Beautiful"	—	14	42	—	—	—	—	—	—	—		Poison Kiss
2023	"Damn These Walls"												Non-album singles
2024	"Rockstars"												Non-album singles
