= Vangough =

American progressive metal band

- Origin: Oklahoma, United States
- Genres: Progressive Metal
- Years active: 2008–present
- Members: Clay Withrow; Kyle Haws; Jeren Martin
- Website: www.facebook.com/officialvangough/

Vangough are an American progressive metal band from Oklahoma, United States. The band was formed by vocalist and guitarist Clay Withrow in 2008 when he wanted to pursue more of a band effort after releasing his solo album, Dissonance Rising. They released their first album Manikin Parade in 2009, which was defined as a cross between Pain of Salvation and The Flower Kings. Their second album, Kingdom of Ruin was released in 2011, and their third album, Between the Madness in 2013. Apart from the studio albums, the band also released an acoustic album titled Acoustic Scars and an instrumental disc inspired by video games titled Game On!

== Manikin Parade ==
The band's debut album Manikin Parade surprised fans and critics of progressive metal alike. Metal Underground and Sea of Tranquility compared the songs to The Flower Kings and Pain of Salvation praising Clay Withrow's vocal styles, guitar playing, and compositional skills.

== Kingdom of Ruin ==
The band signed a record deal with Nightmare Records for their second album Kingdom of Ruin, which was described by Prog Sphere as slightly more "concise" and "focused" while noting that Withrow's vocals are still the "pinnacle" of the band. Dawn of the Deaf praised the production of the album while Danger Dog, awarding the release 5 out of 5 stars, commented on the album's diversity and praised the band's creativity. Metal Temple also gave the album a positive review, remarking: "[The album is] a marvelous trip of Progressive Metal, Rock, Jazz, and Folk unique music."

== Between the Madness ==
Between the Madness generally received positive reviews. Danger Dog awarded it 4.5 stars out of 5 and described it as a "challenging and entertaining" listen while it was described as a "heavy, dark, and a seemingly unrelenting release of creative energy" by Prog Rock Music Talk reviewer Brian McKinnon. Jeff Stevens from Prog Metal Zone called the band "easily one of the best U.S. prog metal bands going right now" while Explicitly Intense defined Between the Madness as an album "of stellar yet epic proportions." Metal Underground claimed the album "bridges the gap between Vangough's left brain and right brain" and pointed out similarities between the songs on the album with the band's prior work. Commented the reviewer: "The overall sound hasn't drastically changed, and even shows some musical nods to prior songs. In "Vaudeville Nation," a scathing condemnation of a track, a clever link is established with Manikin Parade around 4:28. The main melody of the latter is re-introduced on guitars in a straight-played manner. Later in the song, a similar Manikin Parade vocal melody emerges in the line "...and burn the circus to the ground," and up through the yell following it." Prog-Sphere declared it as "one of the albums of the year" and Bloody Good Horror as well as Lords of Metal praised the album's diversity. Oklahoma Gazette called Between the Madness the band's "most enjoyable and well-executed rock opera to date."

== Recent activities ==
The band successfully funded their first live CD on Kickstarter in August, 2014. Also, they are getting ready for their first North American tour with Swedish progressive metal band Pain of Salvation starting in September and covering many states as well as Mexico.
