= Stay Beautiful (The Last Goodnight song) =

2008 single by The Last Goodnight

Single by The Last Goodnight

from the album Poison Kiss
- B-side: "Now That You're Gone"
- Released: February 19, 2008
- Genre: Pop rock
- Length: 3:14
- Label: Virgin
- Songwriter(s): Kurtis John; Jeff Blue; Ely Weisfeld
- Producer(s): Jeff Blue

The Last Goodnight singles chronology
"Pictures of You" (2007)	"Stay Beautiful" (2008)	"If I Talk to God" (2008)

"Stay Beautiful" is the second single from The Last Goodnight's album Poison Kiss (2007).

== Track listings ==
- Australian CD single
1. "Stay Beautiful" – 3:14
2. "Now That You're Gone" – 3:41
3. "Stay Beautiful" (Video)
- Australian digital release
1. "Stay Beautiful" – 3:14
2. "Now That You're Gone" – 3:40

== Charts ==
Chart (2008)	Peak position
Australia (ARIA)	42
US Adult Top 40 (Billboard)	14

== Release history ==
Region	Date	Format(s)	Label	Ref.
United States	February 19, 2008	Hot adult contemporary radio	Virgin	
Australia	May 26, 2008	CD single	EMI	
