= Crimson Glory =

American heavy metal band

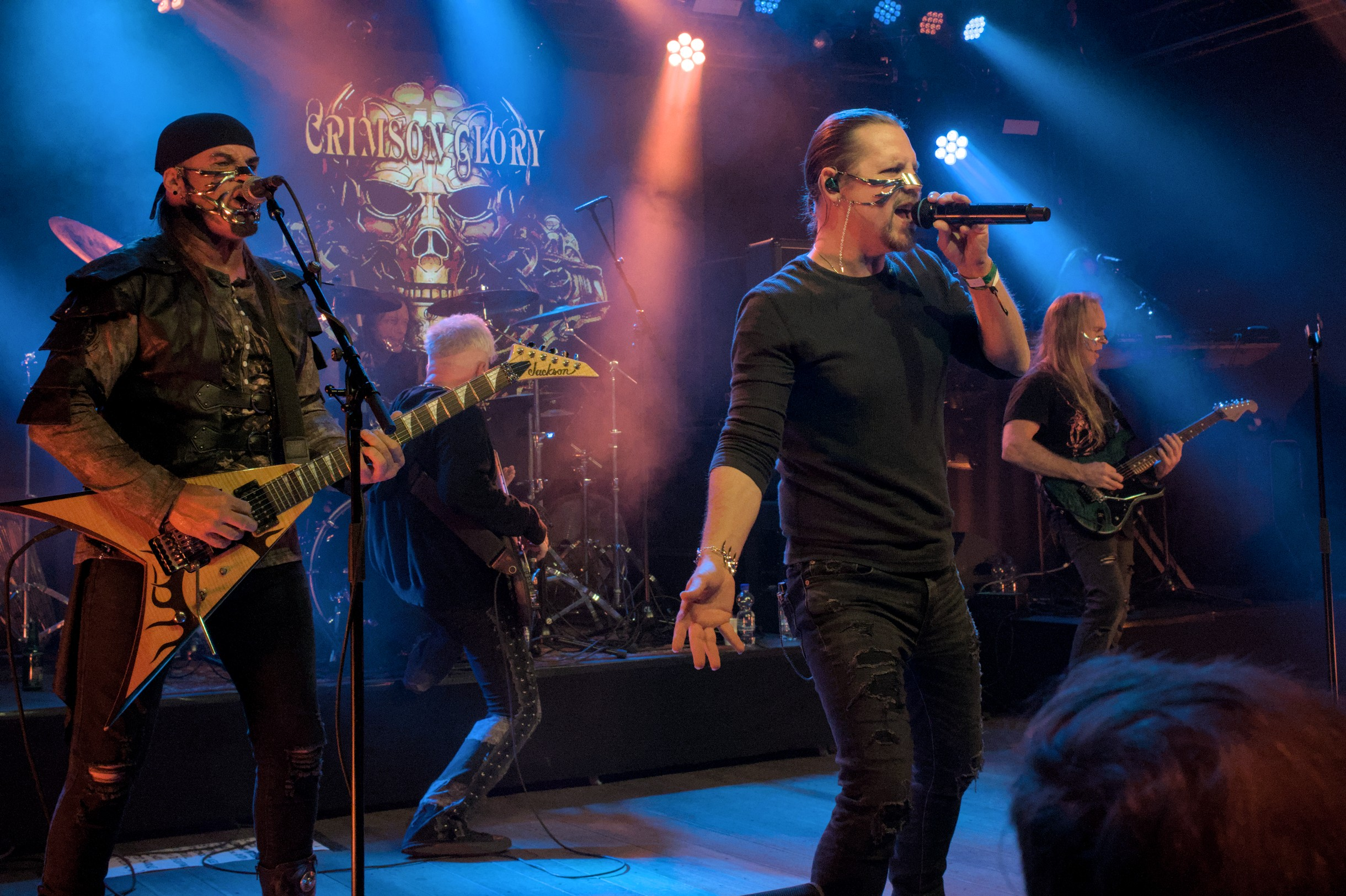
- Crimson Glory performing in 2024

Background information
- Also known as: Pierced Arrow (1979–1982), Beowulf (1982–1983)
- Origin: Sarasota, Florida, U.S.
- Genres: Heavy metal; progressive metal; power metal
- Years active: 1979–1991; 1999–2000; 2005–2013; 2023–present
- Labels: Roadrunner; MCA; Atlantic; Spitfire
- Members: Jeff Lords; Ben Jackson; Dana Burnell; Mark Borgmeyer; Travis Wills
- Past members: Midnight; Jon Drenning; Ravi Jakhotia; Wade Black; Steve Wacholz; Jesse Rojas; Todd La Torre
- Website: officialcrimsonglory.com

Crimson Glory is an American heavy metal band that was formed in 1983 in Sarasota, Florida. It started in 1979 under the name Pierced Arrow, then Beowulf, before settling on Crimson Glory. The classic line-up consisted of the vocalist Midnight, guitarists Jon Drenning and Ben Jackson, bass guitarist Jeff Lords and drummer Dana Burnell. With that lineup, the band rose to international fame in the mid-1980s and was considered one of the pioneers of the American progressive metal movement, along with Queensrÿche, Dream Theater, Fates Warning and Watchtower. To date, the band has released five studio albums and one EP.

== Biography ==
=== Background and formation (1979–1983) ===
Crimson Glory was formed in Sarasota, Florida, in 1979 under the name Pierced Arrow. Pierced Arrow's line-up consisted of Tony Wise on vocals, Bernardo Hernandez and Ben Jackson on guitars, Glen Barnhardt on bass (later replaced by Jeff Lords), and Dana Burnell on drums. Hernandez and Lords were replaced by Chris Campbell and John Colemorgan respectively in late 1981, and in early 1982, the band changed its name to Beowulf. In 1983, the band changed bassists, guitarists and vocals. Lords rejoined, Chris Campbell was replaced by Jon Drenning and Tony Wise by Mark Ormes. Later Mark Ormes left and while searching for a singer, the group found an old school mate of Jeff Lords, John Patrick McDonald (later known as Midnight), singing on the beach. They later changed their name to Crimson Glory after a rose hybrid.

Wise later surfaced in the band Tyger Tyger, and also released a solo album, Germania, before his death from diabetes in 2012.

=== Crimson Glory (1983–1987) ===
They rehearsed for four years before recording their self-titled debut album, produced by Dan Johnson, on Par Records in 1986. This was later re-issued after signing on with their new label, Roadrunner Records (then called Roadracer Records). Tight dual-lead harmonies and soaring vocals feature prominently on this release. They later toured Europe in support of Celtic Frost and Anthrax. They played at the 1987 Hammersmith Odeon.

In an era of sound-and-lookalike metal bands, Crimson Glory's goal was to be immediately identifiable from the others, so they wore full-face metallic silver masks. They used them on stage, as well as for all photo shoots and public appearances. Vocalist Midnight was the exception to this, as his mask left his mouth uncovered.

=== Transcendence (1988–1989) ===
Their next release, Transcendence, was released under Roadrunner Records in Europe and MCA Records in the United States. It contained the song "Lonely", which was their first hit single and music video.

Transcendence was a landmark in the genre, often cited as one of the greatest progressive metal albums of all time, best metal albums of the decade, and an influence by many bands like Cage, Triosphere and Rhapsody of Fire. The album garnered them much praise and attention, both at home and abroad. They were on the cover of Kerrang! magazine in May 1989.

They later toured North America, Europe and Japan with the bands Metallica, Ozzy Osbourne, Queensrÿche, U.D.O., Doro, Anthrax. Their biggest show was in the Metal Hammer Festival in Dortmund, Germany in front of 20,000 fans in the spring 1990.

While on tour in support of their self-titled debut album, they discovered how hot the masks would be on stage. To keep the mystique, they cut them down into a partial Phantom of the Opera style for the Transcendence tour.

While touring behind Transcendence, they performed in front of 5,000 spectators at the Manatee Civic Center in their hometown of Bradenton, Florida, on September 2, 1989. This concert was simulcast across America on Z Rock Radio. There were plans to release this show on DVD. In addition, the band performed "In Dark Places" at the 1989 Tampa Bay Music Awards and walked away with three awards that night – Most Outstanding Male Vocalist (Midnight), Most Outstanding Local Release (Transcendence) and Most Outstanding Metal Band (beating fellow Florida band Savatage for this one).

When the tour ended, drummer Dana Burnell and guitarist Ben Jackson left the group. Ben Jackson later formed the band Parish, which released an album titled Envision in 1995.

=== Strange and Beautiful (1990–1992) ===
Burnell was replaced by Ravi Jakhotia in 1991, who brought a decidedly more "tribal" feel to the band. The material they wrote for the next album was more hard rock oriented and based more upon drum grooves as opposed to guitar riffs, on which their first two albums were largely based. Also Midnight became more involved in the composition of the album. It signified a bold and definite shift away from the metal sound upon which the band had built their reputation. It was at this time the band continued on as a four-piece.

The revamped group was signed to Atlantic Records and released their third album, entitled Strange and Beautiful. Prior to the start of the tour, vocalist Midnight departed as well and retired from the music business for a decade. Guitarist Jon Drenning recruited vocalist David Van Landing as a replacement for Midnight on what was to be a short-lived tour in the US. The biggest show of the tour was at the end of the year in Los Angeles at the Concrete Foundations Forum along with Ozzy Osbourne, Soundgarden and Alice in Chains.

In 1994, Jon Drenning moved to Phoenix, Arizona, and formed the band Crush with Lords, Jakhotia and singer Billy Martinez. In 1995, the band released one self-titled album under that name on Paradigm Records. Crush broke up and reformed a year later as Erotic Liquid Culture with the former Crimson Glory touring vocalist David Van Landing. As with Crush, the group recorded and released one self-titled album for Quadra Records in 1996 before calling it a day. Jon eventually returned to Florida and reformed Crimson Glory in 1999.

=== Astronomica (1999–2000) ===
In late 1996, Drenning and Lords wanted to reform Crimson Glory. They contacted Midnight but he was not interested nor was he in the right physical condition to record an album up to the band's standards. So they contacted the singer Wade Black (from the band Lucian Blaque) and Savatage drummer Steve Wacholz. (Although he is pictured in the album and credited as the drummer, he did not record or tour with the band). Ben Jackson joined later, after his band Parish broke up. This incarnation of the group released Astronomica in 1999 after a big delay because the master tapes were stolen and they had to record the album again. Astronomica sold more than 30,000 copies in Europe in their first few weeks of the release. Following the release they did a few warm-up shows in Florida and toured the Netherlands, Germany, France with Vanden Plas, Belgium and Greece with Kamelot and Evergrey. Troubles began during the tour and after returning to the US the band once again went their separate ways.

=== Reunion and second hiatus (2005–2009) ===
In March 2005, the band announced a reunion with the original line-up. The songwriting process of their fifth album, Metatron, Lucifer and the Divine Chaos (later shortened to Divine Chaos), began. In April 2006, the band confirmed that Midnight would sing on the new album, re-record the vocals for Astronomica and tour with them. On May 1, the band confirmed for the Rockwave Festival in Greece. A few days later it was announced that Black Lotus Records closed its doors and all bands were released of their contracts.

After the show in Greece in July, there were plans to tour Europe. In September, Drenning, Burnell, Lords and Jesse Rojas performed as guest musicians with Ben Jackson Group at Kamelot concert.

On January 22, 2007, Midnight was arrested and charged with driving under the influence with blood-alcohol level .20 or higher. Four days later, the band parted ways with Midnight, saying it would be difficult to work with him "as his current state of mind and his present physical condition would impede plans we have in place for future appearances, releases and recordings". Wade Black, who had recently left Leatherwolf, joined the band again. They played two shows in Florida with Vicious Rumors and in the Bay Area Rock Fest. After that they quietly went on indefinite hiatus.

=== Death of Midnight, Todd LaTorre, and break-up (2009–2013) ===
On July 8, 2009, in hospital with family, friends and bandmates by his side, former singer Midnight died at 3:30 am. Although the press initially stated total kidney and liver failure, the real cause of death was a stomach aneurysm. In memory of their fallen friend and bandmate, Midnight, the band played a tribute show, headlining 2009's ProgPower in Atlanta, Georgia. The show featured many special guest vocalists, including Lance King from Pyramaze, Nils K. Rue from Pagan's Mind, Chris Salinas from Zero Hour, Ronny Monroe from Metal Church, Andy Franck from Brainstorm, Sean Peck from Cage, Danilo Herbert from Mindflow, Joakim Brodén from Sabaton, Michael Eriksen from Circus Maximus, Rob Rock, Mark Boals from Royal Hunt, Clay Barton from Suspyre, Kelly Sundown from Beyond Twilight and their former vocalist, David Van Landing. A few weeks prior to the show, Jon Oliva's Pain guitarist, Matt LaPorte, introduced Todd La Torre to the band and he was added as a guest vocalist at ProgPower X.

In May 2010, the band formally announced Todd La Torre as their new singer. La Torre made his first public appearance as a full-time member of Crimson Glory at the Pathfinder Metal Fest in Marietta, Georgia on October 30, 2010. A drummer for 24 years in various hard rock and heavy metal bands in the Tampa Bay area, he was never seeking out being the frontman of a band, "it just happened". In May 2012, La Torre joined four members of Queensrÿche as singer for two shows under the name Rising West. La Torre has since joined Queensrÿche as a full-time member.

In 2011, to celebrate the 25th anniversary of their first album, the band toured Europe, playing in Netherlands, at the Keep It True XIV and Bang Your Head!!! festivals in Germany, Switzerland, Karmøygeddon festival in Norway and Belgium.

The band were said to be working on a new album and had released a raw demo entitled "Garden Of Shadows". However, in 2013, it was announced that vocalist Todd La Torre parted ways with Crimson Glory. He revealed that the band had been suffering a long period of inactivity, and explained: "We had wonderful momentum and we were working within an important window of time within which the new record should have been recorded and released to have the most impact given the bands resurgence. Unfortunately, the record never materialized despite my best efforts, [and] I haven't been contacted to write with Crimson Glory for over six months."

=== Return with Travis Wills and Chasing the Hydra (2023–present) ===
On December 22, 2023, the band announced they had returned with new vocalist Travis Wills and new guitarist Mark "Borgy" Borgmeyer. They also released a new single, "Triskaideka", and would be releasing a second new single, "Indelible Ashes", in the near future. They also announced several live shows to take place in October 2024 in Europe. In 2025, the band participated in the Hell's Heroes music festival held at the White Oak Music Hall in Houston.

Crimson Glory's first studio album in 27 years, Chasing the Hydra, was released on April 17, 2026.

== Side projects ==
In March 2001, Wade Black and Ben Jackson launched a project called Sector 9 with the drummer Jesse "Martillio" Rojas and bass guitarist Chris Baylor. In July 2001, Ben Jackson left the band to concentrate on his solo career. Jesse Martillo and Chris Baylor also left. Baylor joined Ben Jackson Group and they released an album in 2001. Wade Black went on to front Seven Witches in 2000, Leash Law in 2004 and Leatherwolf in 2006.

Meanwhile, Midnight was scheduled to work with the guitarist Luca Turilli from Rhapsody. He later started to work on a demo tape called Songs from the Attic. He asked his fans via Blabbermouth if they would be willing to buy MP3s instead of a CD. The demo was delayed two times, once because of a post-9/11 power outage. The title was later changed to M and was finally released as an EP on November 30. While working on the EP Midnight had joined forces with former Atheist guitarist Rand Burkey. They started composing material for an album, under the projected title of Cookooflower. A demo from Cookooflower was going to be included on the EP. He later dropped Cookooflower project and the inclusion of the two songs with Burkey after failing to agree in the contract. Burkey uploaded one song to MP3.com for promotional purposes.

In March 2002, Ben Jackson performed two shows at Keegan's Clubhouse Lounge in Sarasota where he played all the songs from his first solo album, Here I Come. Burnell, Lords and Black assisted to the show, while Midnight refused to go. By the same time Midnight's website was taken down by webmaster and partner because of Midnight's lack of involvement in his musical career. A month later his website was re-established under a new domain.

In June, Wade Black left Seven Witches due to "personal and business-related matters within the band". He started a new band with ex-Nocturnus members Mike Davis and Emo Mowery called Tiwanaku. He also resurrected his old band Lucian Blaque. Wade appeared as a guest musician on Rick Renstrom's solo album.

Ben Jackson Group performed at the 2002 Diamond Awards Show at Club Diamonds in Bradenton, Florida.

On July 28, 2003, Ben Jackson posted on his website that he wanted Crimson Glory to reunite with the original line-up, that the band has been waiting for a sign from Midnight. Later, Midnight sang guest vocals on Ben Jackson's second solo album, All Over You.

Jackson and Midnight performed an acoustic set in July 2004. Both were later invited to the ProgPower V Festival to a meet and greet and not to perform. Ben was later invited to perform a song with Kamelot. In December, Midnight signed with Black Lotus Records to release his first solo album, Sakada.

In 2012, Jeff Lords formed the band Dark Matter with vocalist Paul Beach, guitarist Terry Schambers, and drummer Jesse Rojas. So far, this band has released one full-length album, Terminal Endeavor (2012), and one EP, Enchipher (2016); the latter features Todd La Torre singing guest vocals on four tracks.

== Members ==
Current members

- Jeff Lords – bass (1983–1991, 1999–2000, 2005–2013, 2023–present)
- Ben Jackson – rhythm guitar, backing vocals (1983–1989, 1999–2000, 2005–2013, 2023–present)
- Dana Burnell – drums (1983–1989, 2005–2013, 2023–present)
- Travis Wills – lead vocals (2023–present)
- Mark "Borgy" Borgmeyer – lead guitar (2023–present)

Current touring musicians

- Stian Kristoffersen - drums (2026)
- John Zahner – keyboards (1989, 2011–2012, 2024–present)

Former members

- Jon Drenning – lead guitar (1983–1991, 1999–2000, 2005–2013)
- Midnight – lead vocals (1983–1991, 2005–2007; died 2009)
- Ravi Jakhotia – drums (1989–1991)
- Wade Black – lead vocals (1999–2000, 2007–2010)
- Steve "Doc" Wacholz – drums (1999)
- Todd La Torre – lead vocals (2010–2013)

Former touring musicians

- David Van Landing – lead vocals (1991; died 2015)
- Jesse "Martillo" Rojas – drums, percussion, backing vocals (2000)

== Discography ==
"Lady of Winter" (1988)
"Lady of Winter" (Transcendence), demonstrating Crimson Glory's fast tempo, and aggressive musicianship featured in early releases

"Love and Dreams" (1991)
The third album marked a stylistic departure from the progressive metal.

"War of the Worlds" (1999)
"War of the Worlds" (Astronomica), featuring Wade Black on vocals

Albums

- Crimson Glory (1986)
- Transcendence (1988)
- Strange and Beautiful (1991)
- Astronomica (1999)
- Chasing the Hydra (2026)

Singles

- "Dream Dancer" (1986)
- "Lady of Winter" (1988)
- "Lonely" (1988)
- "Promise Land" (1991 Atlantic promotional CD)
- "The Chant" (b/w "Love and Dreams") (1991)
- "Song for Angels" (b/w "Far Away") (1991)
- "Triskaideka" (2023)
- "Indelible Ashes" (2024)

Compilations

- In Dark Places... 1986–2000 (2010)

EPs

- War of the Worlds (2000)

Released demos

- "Garden of Shadows" (2012)
