= David VanLanding =

American singer (1964–2015)

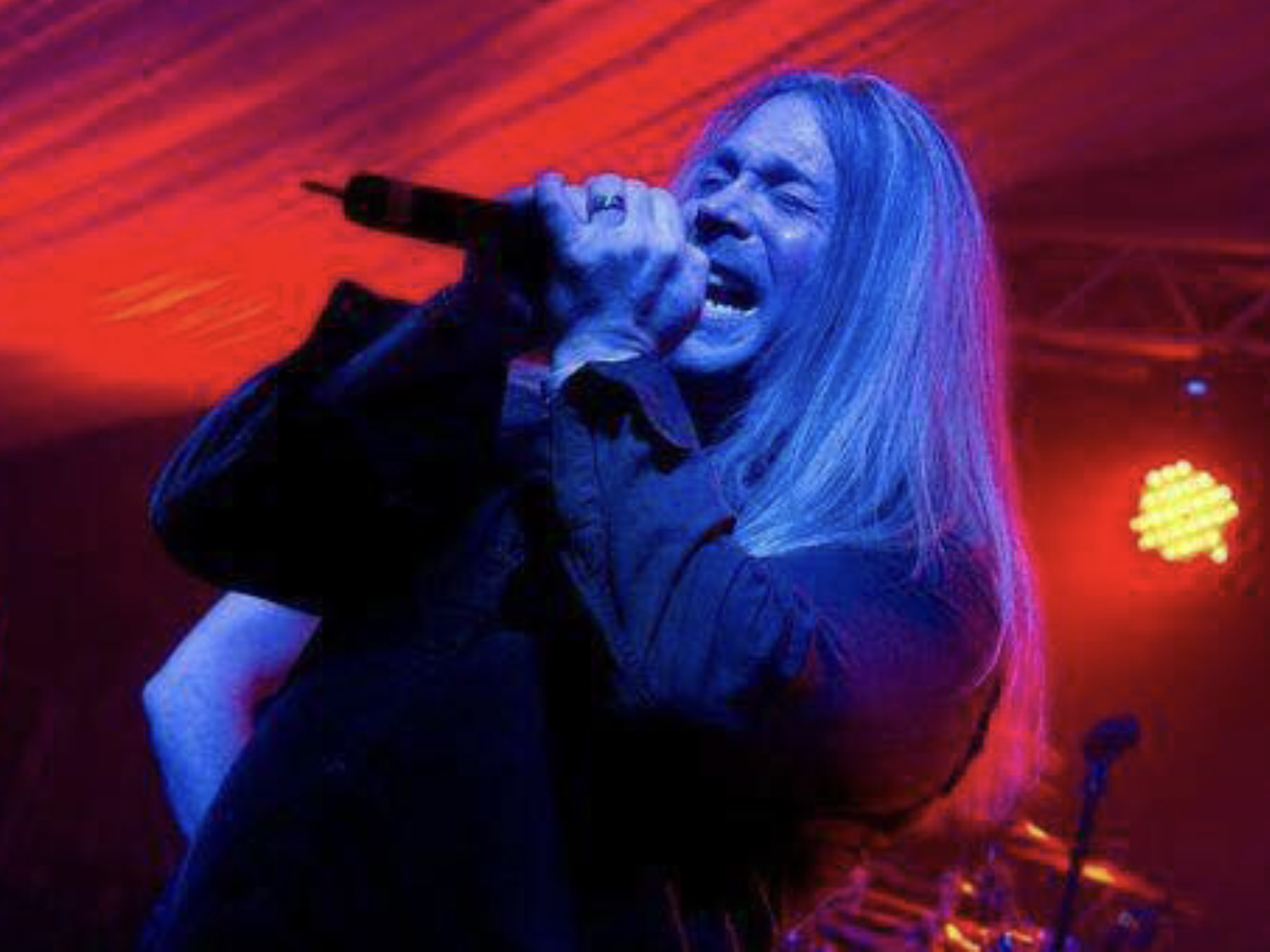
VanLanding performing with MSG in 2013

William David VanLandingham (October 6, 1964 – November 17, 2015), known professionally as David VanLanding or David Van Landing, was an American rock music singer, who worked with Mannekin, Michael Schenker Group, Crimson Glory, Erotic Liquid Culture.

VanLanding was born in October 1964 and studied in Columbia School Of Theatrical Arts in Maryland and took part in several musicals and shows. After graduation from Wakefield High School, Arlington, he joined the Maryland-based band Mannekin and stayed with them until disbanding in 1990. Soon thereafter he was invited to Tony MacAlpine's Eyes Of The World Tour, replacing Alan Sehorn

In 1992, he was with Crimson Glory to replace vocalist Midnight for a short time before they disbanded. A few years later, he reunited with former musicians of Crimson Glory to form the band Erotic Liquid Culture (1996)

In mid-90s he auditioned with Michael Schenker Group, which resulted in three tours during 1997–1999 (USA, Japan, Europe). He was invited by Michael Schenker again for 2011 (Temple Of Rock South American Tour), and 2012 (Temple Of Rock North American Tour), to replace Robin McAuley who was dealing with health issues. Also, Schenker wrote that he and VanLanding were planning a special show together on the Axes and Anchors cruise; February 2016.

Between the tours, VanLanding was teaching voice, fronting various bands and taking part in some cover bands.

VanLanding died on November 17, 2015, in a car accident involving a collision with a dump truck in Clearwater, Florida. He was 51 years old.

== Discography ==
David VanLanding's credits may be found on the following albums:

- CD Erotic Liquid Culture, 1996, Quadra
- CD The Michael Schenker Story Live, May 1997
- CD Michael Schenker Group Live In Tokyo 97, July 2005
