= Midnight (musician) =

American singer (1962–2009)

Background information
- Born: John Patrick McDonald Jr. April 29, 1962
- Died: July 8, 2009 (aged 47) St. Petersburg, Florida, U.S.
- Genres: Heavy metal; progressive metal
- Occupations: Singer, songwriter
- Years active: 1982–2009
- Formerly of: Crimson Glory
- Website: www.allsoulsmidnight.com

Midnight (born John Patrick McDonald Jr.; April 29, 1962 – July 8, 2009) was an American musician best known as the lead vocalist of heavy metal band Crimson Glory. The band became known for Midnight's "ear-shattering screams", which drew comparisons to Geoff Tate, and "painfully strident delivery."

== Career ==
Midnight joined Crimson Glory in the early 1980s. In 1986, their debut album was issued by PAR Records and picked up internationally by Roadrunner Records. It took the newcomers only a couple of years to surpass their debut with their sophomore effort, 1988's Transcendence, a joint release on MCA/Roadrunner. In 1991 they signed to Atlantic Records and released Strange & Beautiful, an album which showed a commercial switch in the band's sound. Not long after the latest release, Midnight left the band and the other members dispersed and became involved with various other acts.

For roughly seven years, Midnight remained out of sight. In the late 1990s, Midnight spent months recording a six-song full-band recording to try to secure a new record deal and some press. Unfortunately, when he left Florida and went to Texas he lost the only original master tape. To recover from this huge setback, Midnight reappeared with a low-budget EP originally titled Songs from the Attic which was later re-released simply as M; produced by Tim Fredenburg and featuring Bobby Kovacs on guitar, it explored a more acoustic direction. Only 500 copies were made. Once again, Midnight vanished, until in late 2004 it was announced that he had joined forces with Black Lotus Records to release his full-length debut solo album, Sakada.

After the release of Sakada, Midnight did a short press tour in Europe which also included several acoustic performances. In 2007, Midnight joined forces with a new group of musicians including Matt LaPorte who also played with the ex-Savatage frontman's band Jon Oliva's Pain, and Lee Harrison, the drummer and founder of the death metal band Monstrosity who also previously toured with Obituary and is currently with Terrorizer, as well. Together they recorded, in addition to the All Souls Midnight disc, material for a 20-song covers disc simply titled Covers, a 36 song 3-CD set of original songs titled M2 – Descending into Madness, and a 24-clip DVD documenting the final recordings called A Strange Tea Party, all of which remains unreleased. Other musicians involved in these recordings were Phil Anderson (who produced and played on Sakada), John Zahner (Crimson Glory, Jon Oliva's Pain), Zane Black (Kozmic Lords), Chris Tripp (Tripp3), Ronnie Dee (Greg Billings), and Jerry Outlaw (Genitorturers, Jon Oliva's Pain).

Midnight joined forces with Jon Oliva in 2008 to re-record "Painted Skies" from Transcendence.

== Death and later developments ==
On July 8, 2009, Midnight died of a stomach aneurysm at the age of 47 in St. Petersburg, Florida. In memory of their fallen bandmate, the rest of Crimson Glory played a tribute show, headlining 2009's ProgPower. The show featured several guest vocalists, including Todd La Torre, who eventually joined the band as their new lead singer.

== Discography ==
=== Crimson Glory ===
- Crimson Glory (1986)
- Transcendence (1988)
- Strange and Beautiful (1991)

=== Solo ===
- The Lost Tape (1998); unreleased
- Songs from the Attic (2000)
- M (2001)
- Sakada (2005)
- All Souls Midnight (2008), 100 copies on CD-R only
- Covers (2009) unreleased
- A Strange Tea Party DVD (2009); unreleased
- M2: Descending into Madness (2014)
- Through Oceans of Space (2021); released in 2023

=== Guest appearances ===
- Genius: A Rock Opera (2002): Maindream character
- Ben Jackson Group - All Over You (2005): guest vocals on "Rock n' Roll Heaven (or Bust)"
