= Andi Kravljaca =

Swedish singer

- Born: Andi Kravljača; 11 August 1981 (age 45); Sarajevo, Bosnia and Herzegovina
- Origin: Sweden
- Genres: Progressive metal Power metal Heavy metal Symphonic metal Melodic death metal Gothic metal
- Instrument: singer
- Years active: 2002–present
- Website: www.aeonzen.com

Andi Kravljaca is a Bosnian-born Swedish heavy metal singer and guitarist, most known for his vocal work in progressive metal band Aeon Zen, although he is perhaps best known as vocalist for Swedish progressive metal band, Seventh Wonder, appearing on the band's first album, Become, in 2005. He was born in Sarajevo.

He holds a master's degree in physics, field and particle theory from the University of Stockholm, is a qualified pilot and has lectures on Meteorology on YouTube.

== Active bands and projects ==
=== Nergard – 2013–present ===
In 2013, Kravljaca appeared alongside among others Göran Edman, Nils K Rue and Ralf Scheepers as one of the lead vocalists on Norwegian melodic metal band Nergard's first album 'Memorial for a Wish'. In 2015 the Norwegian band released another album, titled 'A Bit Closer to Heaven' which again featured Kravljaca alongside other vocalists such as Elize Ryd and Nils K. Rue. 2021 saw the release of the third Nergard album, 'Eternal White', on which Kravljaca was one of three featured singers, as well as playing several guitar and one keyboard solo for the record.

=== Nibiru Ordeal – 2017–present ===
In 2017 Kravljaca was announced as the new frontman of the Finnish power metal band Nibiru Ordeal. Singles "Stardust" and "Gone with the Wind" were released shortly after. The band released their first full length album "Solar Eclipse" on 15 November 2019 with Andi as their lead vocalist.

=== Bioplan – 2019–present ===
In late 2018, Kravljaca embarked on an instrumental solo project, choosing to forego singing for guitar and keyboard work. The debut EP, 'Ocular', was released in April 2019, with another two EPs following in 2020 and 2022 respectively.

=== Hydra ===
Published in 2022 by Frontiers Music, Hydra's debut album 'Point Break' features Kravljaca on vocals as well as rhythm and lead guitars.

== Previous bands and projects ==
=== Seventh Wonder – 2002–2005 ===
Kravljaca joined Seventh Wonder in 2002, and appeared on the band's second demo recording 'Temple in the Storm', subsequently also appearing as lead vocalist for the band's debut album, 'Become', released in 2005. Following the release of the album, the band and Andi parted ways.

=== Silent Call – 2006–2014 ===
In 2006 Kravljaca joined the Swedish progressive metal band Silent Call, which subsequently released their debut album "Creations From A Chosen Path" in 2008. 2010 saw the release of Silent Call's second album, Greed. Following the release of Silent Call's third album 'Truth's Redemption' in 2014, and citing exhaustion from excessive touring, Kravljaca decided to leave Silent Call in late 2014.

=== Thaurorod – 2012–2018 ===
In late 2012, following a lengthy audition process by the band, Kravljaca was announced as the new singer and frontman of Finnish power metal band Thaurorod. He appears on the band's 2013 release "Anteinferno" and the 2018 release 'Coast of Gold', after which the band ceased being active.

=== Aeon Zen – 2009–2021 ===
In 2009 Kravljaca recorded two vocal guest appearances, and two guitar solos, with the UK progressive metal band, Aeon Zen. Following the release of the album, Kravljaca also recorded and appeared on the Time Divine single, recorded vocals on two more songs on their second album, and in 2010 performed live with Aeon Zen for the first time. In 2011, Kravljaca toured with Aeon Zen supporting Devin Townsend on his European tour. Kravljaca has since 2013 been a full member of Aeon Zen, after being the main vocalist on their 2013 album, Enigma. In 2014, the album Ephemera was released. This album digs further into the modern side of progressive metal. Aeon Zen released the album 'Inveritas' in 2019, and released their final album, 'Trans/Versal' in 2021.

== Guest and session musician ==
=== Departure – 2012 ===
In 2012, Kravljaca made a guest appearance on the Departure album 'Hitch A Ride', performing all of the vocals on the record.

=== Celestial Decay – 2014 ===
Following a selection process, Kravljaca was selected as the lead vocalist for Swedish Symphonic Metal band "Celestial Decay"'s second album: "QuantumX", which was released in 2014.

=== The Chronicles Project – 2015 ===
2015 also saw the release of another project in which Kravljaca took part, which was 'When Darkness Falls' by The Chronicles Project. This project was again a collaboration between musicians worldwide and is a concept album.

=== Temet Nosce – 2015–2019 ===
In 2015, Kravljaca appeared live with Norwegian band Temet Nosce, and subsequently released two singles, 'Boomerang' and 'Stargazer' later that year. In the years since, Kravljaca has continued to work with Temet Nosce, releasing a further two singles so far.

=== First Signal – 2022– ===
Kravljaca is featured on the fourth First Signal album, 'Closer To The Edge', playing roughly half of the rhythm and lead guitars on the album alongside Michael Palace.

== Discography ==
=== Studio albums ===
- Hydra - DeHydration, 2026 (v, g)
- Kindred North - Kindred North, 2026 (v, g)
- Hydra - ReHydration, 2024 (v, g)
- Find Me - Nightbound, 2024 (g)
- Hydra - Point Break, 2022 (v, g)
- First Signal - Closer To The Edge, 2022 (g)
- Aeon Zen – Trans/Versal, 2021 (v)
- Nergard – Eternal White, 2021 (v, g, k)
- Nibiru Ordeal – Solar Eclipse, 2019 (v, g)
- Aeon Zen – Inveritas, 2019 (v)
- Aeon Zen – Ephemera (Game of The Year Edition), 2018 (v)
- Thaurorod – Coast of Gold, 2018 (v, g)
- The Chronicles Project – When Darkness Falls, 2015 (v, g, k)
- Nergard – A Bit Closer To Heaven, 2015 (v)
- Silent Call – Truth's Redemption, 2014 (v)
- Aeon Zen – Ephemera, 2014 (v)
- Celestial Decay – QuantumX, 2014 (v)
- Thaurorod – Anteinferno, 2013 (v)
- Nergard – Memorial for a Wish, 2013 (v)
- Aeon Zen – Enigma, 2013 (v)
- Departure – Hitch A Ride, 2012 (v)
- Aeon Zen – The Face of the Unknown, 2010 (v)
- Silent Call – Greed, 2010 (v)
- Aeon Zen – A Mind's Portrait, 2009 (v, g)
- Silent Call – Creations From A Chosen Path, 2008 (v, g)
- Seventh Wonder – Become, 2005 (v)

v = vocals g = guitars k= keyboards

=== EPs ===
- Bioplan – Arcade Dreams, 2022 (g)
- Bioplan – Epipath, 2020 (g)
- Bioplan – Ocular, 2019 (g)
- Nergard – Intermission, 2014 (v)
- Aeon Zen – Self Portrait, 2013 (v)

v = vocals g = guitars k= keyboards

=== Singles and Guest appearances ===
- Nergard - Destiny (TNT tribute single), 2025 (v, g)
- Asterise - Farewell (guest guitar solo), 2024 (g)
- Nergard - Blood Red Skies (Judas Priest tribute single), 2022 (v, g)
- Asterise - Promised Land (guest guitar solo), 2022 (g)
- Phoenix Down - A Brief Impasse (lead guitar), 2021 (g)
- TDW - No Can Do (guest guitar solo), 2020 (g)
- Eigenflame - Lines of Liberty (single), 2020 (v)
- Temet Nosce – Exit Stereotyp (single), 2019 (v)
- Temet Nosce – Fire (single), 2018 (v)
- Nibiru Ordeal – Gone with the Wind (single), 2017 (v)
- Nibiru Ordeal – Stardust (single), 2017 (v)
- The Rose of Lilith – Soulless (single), 2017 (v)
- Thaurorod - Deja Vu (Iron Maiden tribute single), 2016 (v)
- Nergard - One of These Days (single), 2016 (v)
- Temet Nosce – Stargaze (single), 2015 (v)
- Aeon Zen – Disconnected (single), 2015 (v)
- Temet Nosce – Boomerang (single), 2015 (v)
- The Rose of Lilith – Serenity (single), 2015 (v)
- Sense vs Sanity – Another Me (acoustic bonus track), Out of The Void, 2013 (v)
- Aeon Zen – Time Divine (single), 2010 (v)

v = vocals g = guitars k= keyboards
