= Aeon Zen =

British progressive rock/metal band

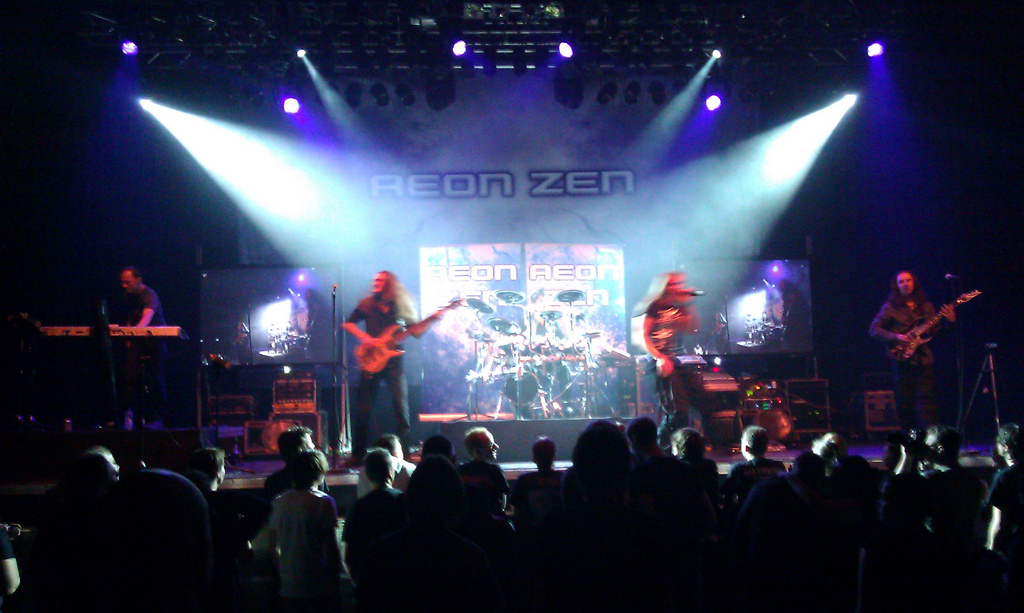

Background information
- Origin: Cambridge, England
- Genre: Progressive metal
- Years active: 2008–2021
- Labels: Time Divide Records, Nightmare Records
- Formerly of: Timefall
- Members: Rich Gray; Andi Kravljaca; Alistair Bell; Steve Burton
- Past members: Lloyd Musto; Shaz; Tom Green

Aeon Zen are an English progressive metal band formed in 2008, led by founding member Rich Gray (formerly Hinks). They have been praised and heavily featured in the international music press, labelled by Classic Rock Magazine as 'a strong contender for best newcomer at the very, very least' and, additionally, as Progression Magazine’s selection for "debut album of the year".

To date, the band has released six studio albums, and have assembled a line-up for live performances. Their first and second albums, entitled A Mind's Portrait and The Face of the Unknown respectively, were released through Time Divide Records on 1 May 2009 and 12 October 2010. These were followed by Enigma, released through Nightmare Records on 22 January 2013, Ephemera, released on 1 September 2014, Inveritas, released on 10 May 2019, and Transversal, released on 24 September 2021.

== History ==
=== Origins and A Mind's Portrait (2008–2010) ===
Aeon Zen was founded in 2008 when Rich Gray and Lloyd Musto decided to form a new studio project. Unlike their previous bands, such as Timefall, which had a one-to-one correlation of members and instruments, Aeon Zen consisted of just the two members, with Musto playing drums and Gray on all other instruments and production. Vocal duties were, on their debut album, shared amongst guests. According to the band, the name Aeon Zen was chosen to portray an "eternal state of bliss and enlightenment", although the use of Aeon as an adjective is a non-standard construction.

Writing and recording for their first album started in late 2008 and took roughly two months to complete, with both writing and recording occurring simultaneously. Several of the songs on A Mind's Portrait were written several weeks before the album was released, with Gray composing the majority of the material.

Following the completion of the album, the band was signed to the record label Time Divide Records Ltd. in November 2008. This signing, and subsequent likelihood of an album release, helped in the conscription of the necessary guest vocalists such as Nils K. Rue of Pagan's Mind and Andi Kravljaca of Silent Call (ex Seventh Wonder), among others. The album was finally released on 1 May 2009. Artwork for the album was designed by Mattias Norén, who had previously undertaken work for groups such as Outworld, Evergrey and Into Eternity, among others.

Shortly after the album release, Lloyd Musto left the band to pursue other projects. As of 2009, Rich was working on a 2nd album, as well as putting together a live band and rehearsing with session musicians to tour and play shows.

=== The Face of the Unknown and Live Band (2010–2013) ===
In July 2010 the band played their first live gig at the Luminaire in London, a performance that was praised for its high fidelity sound but critiqued for the undersized venue. During this time, Gray had been working on a follow-up album and, on 5 August 2010, he announced that The Face of the Unknown would be released on 12 October of the same year under the Time Divide label. Guest vocalists announced included Michael Eriksen (Circus Maximus), Andi Kravljaca (Silent Call), Nick D'Virgilio (Spock's Beard), Jem Godfrey (Frost*) and Jonny Tatum (Eumeria). Artwork for the album was, once again, designed by Mattias Norén.

In early 2011 the band announced that they were embarking on a 23-date European tour with The Devin Townsend Project, spanning the UK, Germany, Sweden, Norway and the Netherlands, among others.

=== Enigma, Inveritas, Transversal and disbandment (2013–2021) ===
After a delay as the band switched labels to Nightmare Records, their third album, Enigma, was released on 22 January 2013.

On 20 September 2013, it was announced on Facebook that Shaz left the band.

In 2019, they released Inveritas.

On 24 September 2021, Aeon Zen released their final studio album, Transversal, consisting of one single 30-minute song split across 10 different tracks. The song was composed as a tribute to the band's whole career, with the artwork referencing all previous albums.

== Musical style and critical response ==
Aeon Zen's music has been described as transcending stylistic and generic boundaries, moving from soft to heavy and defying categorization as purely metal, rock, progressive or even classical. A fusion of "many stylistic elements", Aeon Zen's music, as exhibited on A Mind's Portrait, includes "catchy melodies", "a diverse mix of songs and styles", and "progressive time changes" which "run through the gamut of emotions".

In terms of comparison, many reviewers have noted their affinity with others in the Progressive Metal field, notably Dream Theater, Queensrÿche and Symphony X. The main departure from these groups is in the montage of styles presented on the album. Some reviewers felt that the "multiplicity of ideas" could be too overbearing for listeners unfamiliar with a new group, or even that such an overloading led to an overall "incoherence" on the album. Other reviewers felt that, rather than being a sign of weakness, it was a commendable feat to have enlisted the vocal services of so many prominent artists within the field.

Nevertheless, the band felt obliged to counter these assertions by stating that the intermixture of styles is exactly the effect that was intended:

I wanted to create something different to anything I had done before and I also wanted to achieve an effect with the album that was truly breathtaking and I was sure I had enough quality material to stand up on its own and be noticed.

Furthermore, in a video interview, Rich Gray stated that "[on A Mind's Portrait] you even have piano ballads, there's even an orchestral track (mixed in with heavier progressive rock and metal tracks). Vocally, there's everything ranging from operatic power metal style singing, all the way to death metal growling. Nothing is out of the question." However, even those critics who believed the band were yet to find their "musical identity", praised the album as a bold statement of intent, particularly given the young age of the musicians.

== Band members ==
=== Current ===
- Rich Gray (formerly Hinks) – vocals, guitars, bass, keyboards, alto saxophone (2008–present), drums (2009–2012)
- Andi Kravljaca – vocals (2012–present)
- Steve Burton – drums (2012–present)
- Alistair Bell – guitars (2014–present)

=== Former ===
Studio

- Lloyd Musto – Drums, Vocals (2008–2009)
- Shaz Dudhia – Keyboards (2012–2013)
- Matt Shepherd - Lead Guitar (2009–2013)

Live

- Jamie Brooks – Keyboards (2010)
- Cristian Van Schuerbeck – Keyboards (2010)
- Mike Lennon – Drums (2010)
- Shaz Dudhia – Keyboards (2012–2013)
- Vadim Pruzhanov (DragonForce) – Keyboards (2011)
- Matt Shepherd – Guitar (2010-2013)
- Tom Green – keyboards (2014)

== Discography ==
- A Mind's Portrait (2009)
- The Face of the Unknown (2010)
- Enigma (2013)
- Ephemera (2014)
- Inveritas (2019)
- Transversal (2021)

=== EPs and singles ===
- Live In Tilburg (2011)
- Self Portrait (2013)
- Disconnected (2015)
