= Hell Symphony =

Studio album by Root
- Released: 1991
- Genre: Black metal
- Length: 44:18
- Label: Zeras Records
- Producer: Jiří "Big Boss" Valter, Pavel Zym, Petr Hošek

Root chronology
Zjevení (1990)	Hell Symphony (1991)	The Temple in the Underworld (1992)

Hell Symphony is the second full-length album by Czech black metal band Root. It was originally released in 1991.

The album contains the first Root songs in the English language. On the band’s homepage, the style was described as heavy compared to the "monumentality of The Temple in the Underworld, mystery of Kärgeräs and the dark charm of The Book". Rock Hard magazine featured Hell Symphony on its list 250 Black-Metal-Alben, die man kennen sollte.

"The Oath" and "Satan’s March" were included as bonus tracks in the 2001 re-release of the album along with live versions of "The Old Ones", "Message", "Leviathan" and "Píseň pro Satana".

== Track listing ==
No.	Title	Writer(s)	Length
1.	"Beelzebub"	Petr Hošek	6:16
2.	"Belial"	Dan Janáček, Petr Hošek	2:55
3.	"Lucifer"	Petr Hošek	3:50
4.	"Abaddon"	Jiří Valter	3:00
5.	"Asmodeus"	Petr Hošek	3:03
6.	"Satan"	Jiří Valter	4:00
7.	"Leviathan"	Petr Hošek, Jiří Valter	5:34
8.	"Astaroth"	Jiří Valter	2:44
9.	"Loki"	Petr Hošek	4:17
10.	"The Prayers"	Petr Hošek	3:50
11.	"The Oath"	Petr Hošek	0:40
12.	"Satan's March"	Jiří Valter, Petr Hošek	3:47

== Personnel ==
- Jiří "Big Boss" Valter - Vocals, Keyboards, Effects, Percussion
- Petr "Blackosh" Hošek - Electric & Acoustic Guitars, Vocal Backing
- Dan "Mr. D.A.N." Janáček - Guitars
- Rostislav "Black Drum" Mozga - Drums
