= Zjevení =

Studio album by Root
- Released: December 1990 (Czech Republic); 1999 (worldwide)
- Recorded: 16/28 July 1990
- Genre: Black metal
- Length: 37:03 (vinyl); 47:16 (CD)
- Label: Zeras (Czech Republic); Sheer Records (worldwide)
- Producer: Big Boss

Root chronology
| Zjevení (1990) | Hell Symphony (1991) |

Alternative cover
- Cover of the 1991 CD re-issue

Professional ratings
Review scores
| Source | Rating |
|---|---|
| Death Metal Underground | Favorable link |
| MetalReviews.com | 86/100 link |
| Destructive Music | 9/10 link |

Zjevení ("Revelation") is the debut album by Czech black metal band Root, released in December 1990 through now-defunct record label Zeras. It is noticeably the only full-length album by the band to feature songs with lyrics in Czech, and is regarded for shaping the sonority of the early Czech black metal scene of the late 1980s/early to mid-1990s.

The album's cover art and photography was responsible by František "Franta" Štorm, a long-time friend of Root's frontman Big Boss and founding member of yet another influential Czech black metal band, Master's Hammer. He also collaborated with Root on the cover art of their single "7 černých jezdců/666".

The album was re-issued in CD format in 1991 with a different cover art (also by Franta Štorm) and the bonus track "Hřbitov". A music video was made for it.

Sheer Records, another now-defunct Czech label, distributed the album outside the Czech Republic, re-releasing it in 1999 with its title translated into English as The Revelation. The track list also comes with English titles, and is slightly different than the original Zeras one ("Hřbitov" becomes track 8 while "Cesta zkázy" becomes track 12). Sheer's version is currently out of print and very rare to find, but in 2008 it was reprinted by Nuclear War Now! Productions. Both versions have different artworks.

The lyrics to "Intro" were taken from the Tenth Enochian Key, as transcribed by Anton LaVey on the Satanic Bible and translated to Czech by Big Boss.

== Covers ==
German black metal band Nargaroth covered "Píseň pro Satana" on their 2001 album Black Metal ist Krieg: A Dedication Monument.

== Critical reception ==
Zjevení is frequently lauded for being one of the cornerstones of the early Czech black metal scene, alongside Master's Hammer's Ritual. (1991) and Maniac Butcher's Barbarians (1995). Lance Viggiano of Death Metal Underground gave it a positive review, comparing Root's sonority and aesthetics favorably to Mercyful Fate and Black Sabbath, and saying that the album "is not only historical significant as a metal record but also possesses a high degree of tunefulness. Zjevení rewards the listener without a strict reliance on mental imagery and artistic intent. The immediacy of this quality is deceptive and easily disparaged but it is required when providing a complete musical experience". MetalReviews.com gave it an 86 out of 100, comparing the album's sonority to early Voivod and stating that "as a debut, Zjevení is undoubtedly brilliant. The six-minute 'Cesta zkázy' alone is worth buying the album for, as all over the place as it is there's still a hefty epic section which made my mind turn lovingly to the brilliance of The Book. Alas, Zjevení isn't quite as good, but it still is an excellent piece of the Root puzzle, and is absolutely vital for fans". Writing for Destructive Music, Michael Hing rated the album with a 9 out of 10, praising "Big Boss's unique vocal style [that] cuts over the sometimes doomy and sometimes violent music with the raspy vocals of a possessed satanic priest". He concluded his review by saying that "[It's] not hard to see why Root are one band which are held in such high esteem by lovers of underground extreme metal".

== Track listing ==
All lyrics are written by Big Boss, except for "Intro" by Anton LaVey.

| No. | Title | English title | Length |
|---|---|---|---|
| 1. | "Intro" | | 1:48 |
| 2. | "Zjevení" | Revelation | 4:33 |
| 3. | "Aralyon" | | 3:09 |
| 4. | "Výslech" | Interrogation | 1:16 |
| 5. | "Upálení" | Immolation | 4:03 |
| 6. | "Píseň pro Satana" | Song for Satan | 2:49 |
| 7. | "666" | | 2:55 |
| 8. | "7 černých jezdců" | 7 Black Horsemen | 3:06 |
| 9. | "Démon" | Demon | 3:09 |
| 10. | "Znamení" | Sign | 3:36 |
| 11. | "Cesta zkázy" | Path of Destruction | 6:34 |

CD re-issue bonus track
| No. | Title | English title | Length |
|---|---|---|---|
| 12. | "Hřbitov" | Cemetery | 3:49 |

== Personnel ==
- Big Boss (Jiří Valter) – vocals, production
- Petr "Blackie" Hošek – guitar
- Black Drum (Rostislav Mozga) – drums
- Mr. D.A.N. (Daniel Janáček) – guitar
- František Štorm – photography, cover art
