= Insania (Czech band) =

Czech metal band

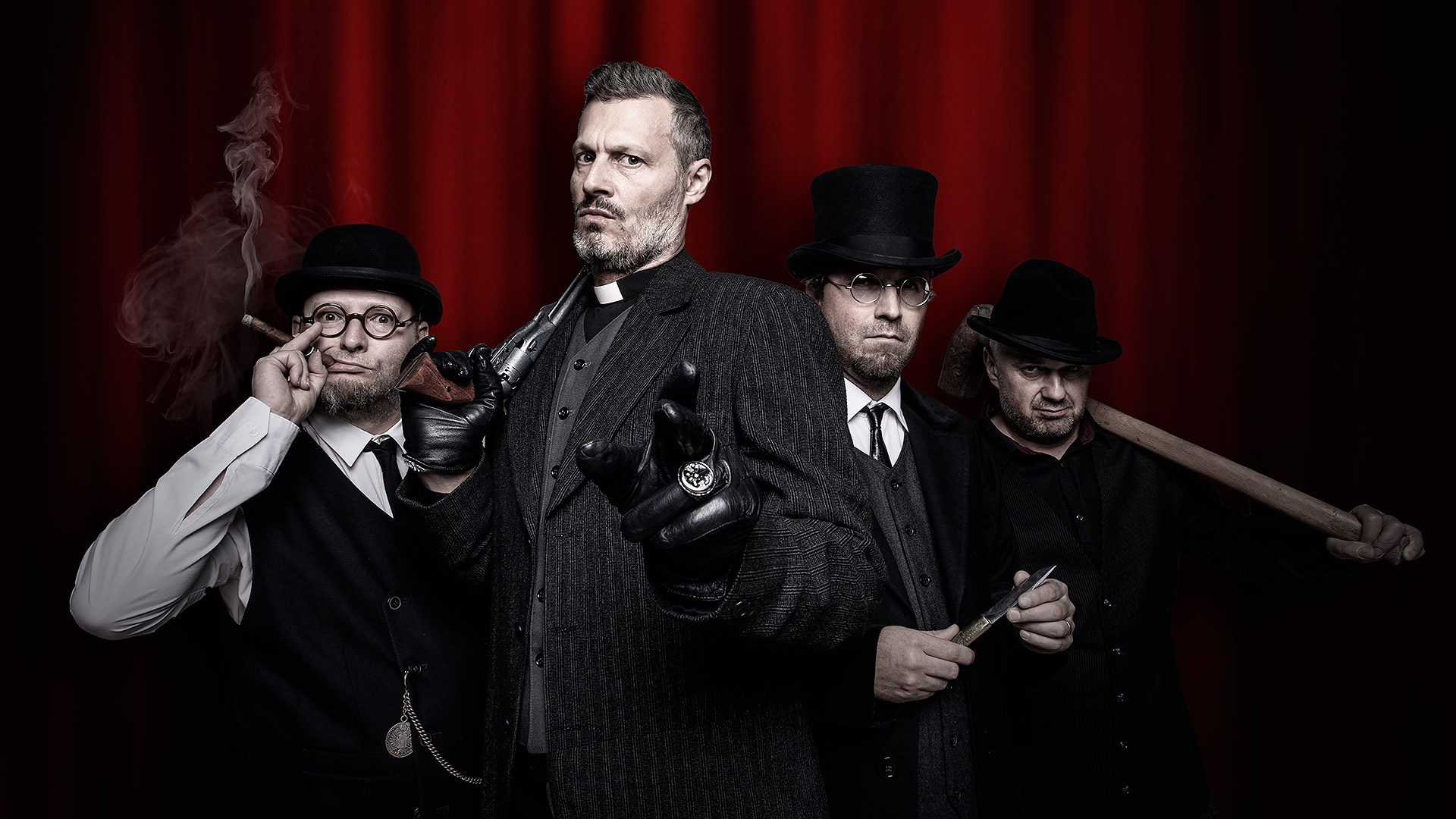
- Insania in 2022. L–R: Klíma, Poly, Tudy, BlackDrum

Background information
- Also known as: Skimmed; INSANIA & the Aristocracy of New Outlaws
- Origin: Brno, Czech Republic
- Genres: Crossover; post-hardcore
- Years active: 1987–present
- Labels: Smile Music Records; Redblack
- Members: Petr Pálenský; Petr Holubář; Radovan Kříž; Rostislav Mozga
- Past members: Martin Vrbík; Marek Loučka; Jan Krátký; Martin Maleček
- Website: insania.cz

Insania (stylized as 1N54N14 and also known as INSANIA & the Aristocracy of New Outlaws) is a Czech crossover/post-hardcore band from Brno, formed in 1987. It consists of vocalist and guitarist Petr "Poly" Pálenský, keyboard player Petr "Tudy" Holubář, bassist Radovan "Klíma" Kříž, and drummer Rostislav "BlackDrum" Mozga. As of 2025, they have released ten studio albums, three EPs, and one live record. They have won Anděl Awards for four of their albums.

== History ==
=== Early years (1987–1990) ===
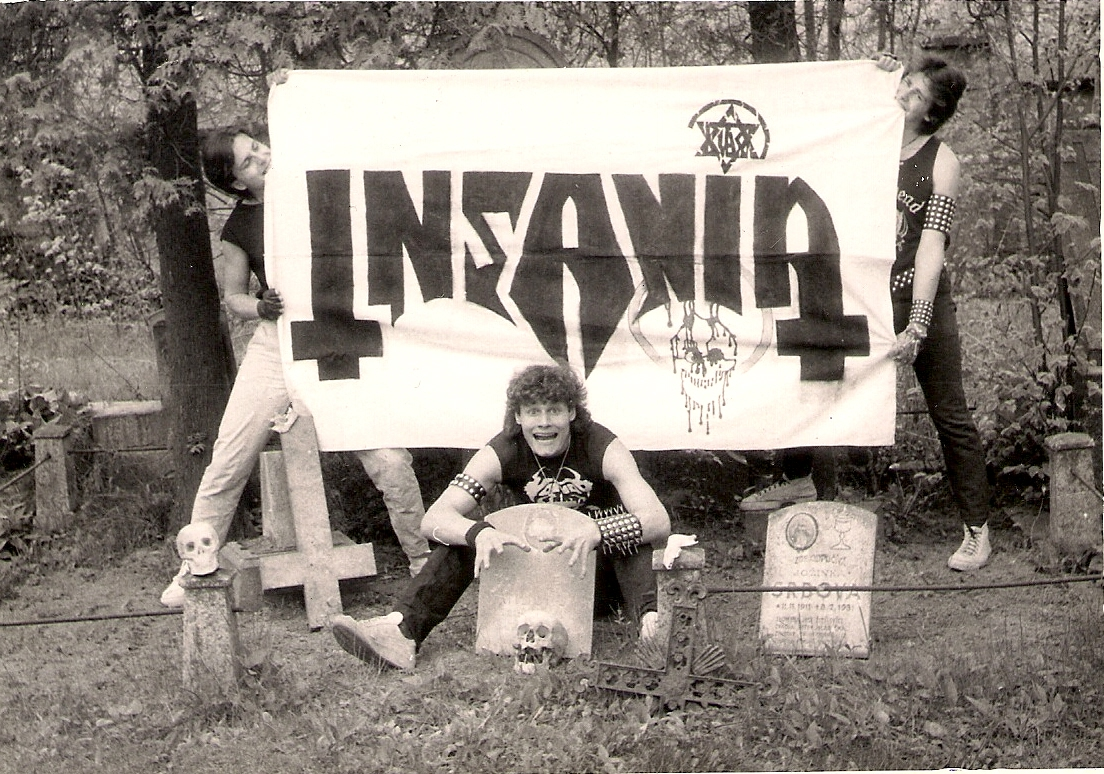
The original Insania lineup in Obřany, Brno, in 1988. L–R: Vrba, Poly, Malcev

Insania was founded in 1987 in Brno, in the former Czechoslovakia (present-day Czech Republic), by guitarist/singer Petr "Poly" Pálenský, bassist Martin "Vrba" Vrbík, and drummer Martin "Malcev" Maleček. After several concerts, their activity was stopped by the secret state police in 1988. The band continued to rehearse under the name Skimmed, and after the Velvet Revolution, in 1990, they released their debut studio album, New Insanity, under the combined title of Insania and Skimmed.

=== R.U.DEAD? and Crossfade (1992–1994) ===
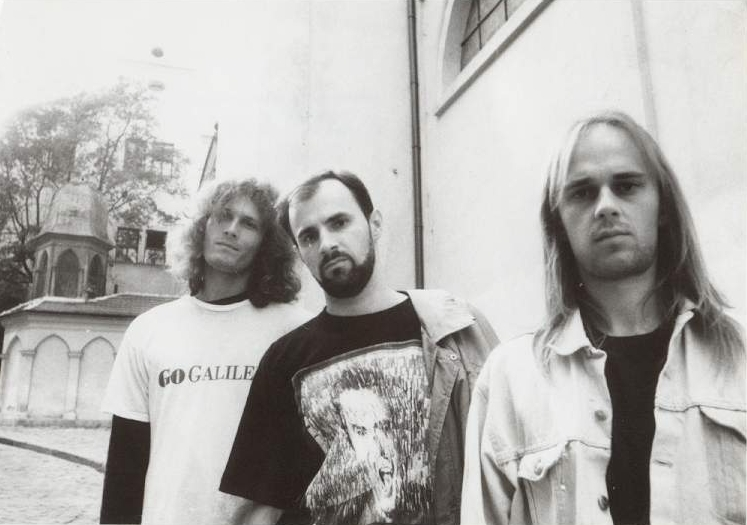
Insania in 1994. L–R: Poly, Calvera, BlackDrum

In 1992, the group resumed its activity under the name Insania, this time with drummer Rostislav "BlackDrum" Mozga, whom Poly had met while playing guitar with the black metal band Root, and bassist Marek Loučka. After releasing the demo R.U.Dead? the same year and the EP Vertigo a year later, in 1994, they issued their first studio album as Insania, titled Crossfade. A video was produced for the opening track, "Zimní varování". After Loučka left, he was replaced by Jan "Calvera" Krátký.

=== God Is Insane ...Join Him!, Virtu-Ritual, US tour (1995–2000) ===
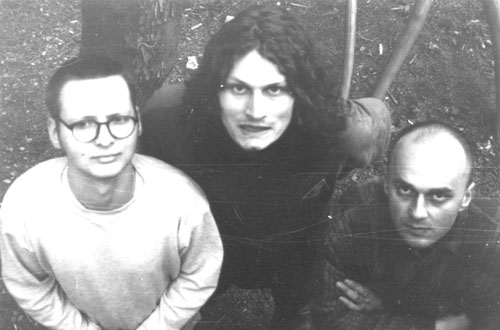
Insania in 1997. L–R: Klíma, Poly, BlackDrum

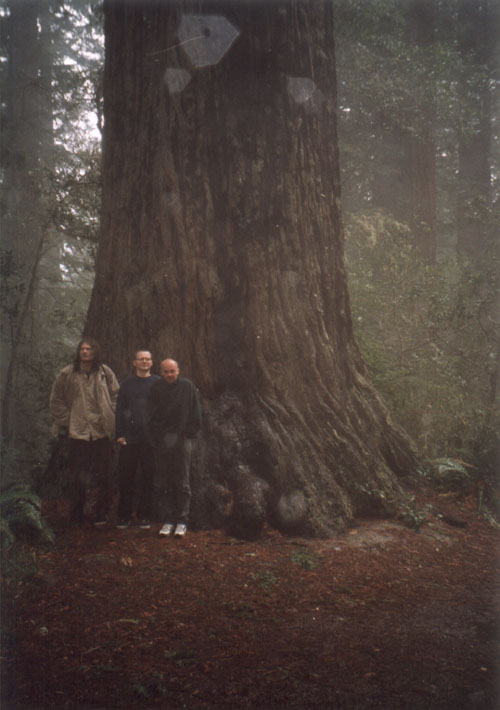
Insania during its 1999 US tour, photographed in Sequoia National Park. L–R: Poly, Klíma, BlackDrum

In 1996, Insania released their second album, God Is Insane ... Join Him!, with a video for the song "Snigger". This was followed by Virtu-ritual in 1998 and a video for "Máj". Subsequent to a US tour in 1999, the band published the album Recycling & Live in Seattle in 2000, which includes five rerecorded tracks from Crossfade, nine live takes, two new songs, recorded in Seattle, and three remixes. Around this time, the group issued a polemical statement titled Manifesto of the Aristocracy of the New Outcasts and began calling themselves INSANIA & the Aristocracy of New Outlaws, so as to be distinguished from the Swedish power metal band Insania. In addition, the following year, a 16-track remix album by various DJs, titled Tamto remixuje Insanii, came out.

=== Trans-Mystic Anarchy, OUT (2001–2006) ===
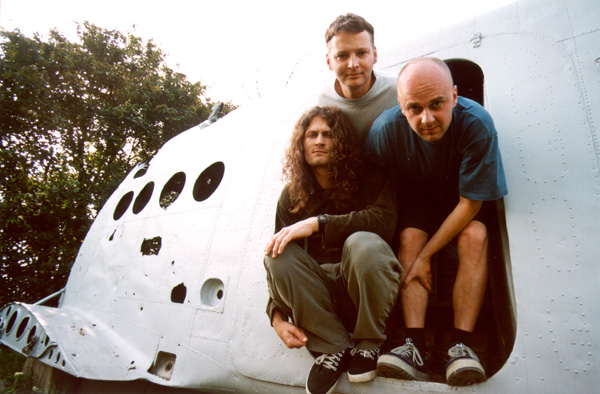
Insania in 2001. L–R: Poly, Klíma, BlackDrum

On 15 January 2001, Insania released its fourth studio album, Trans-Mystic Anarchy, and followed it with OUT in 2004. Two videos were produced for that album: "Letíme dál" and "It's Easy to Fall in Hate".

=== Rock'n'Freud, Kult Hyeny (2007–2012) ===
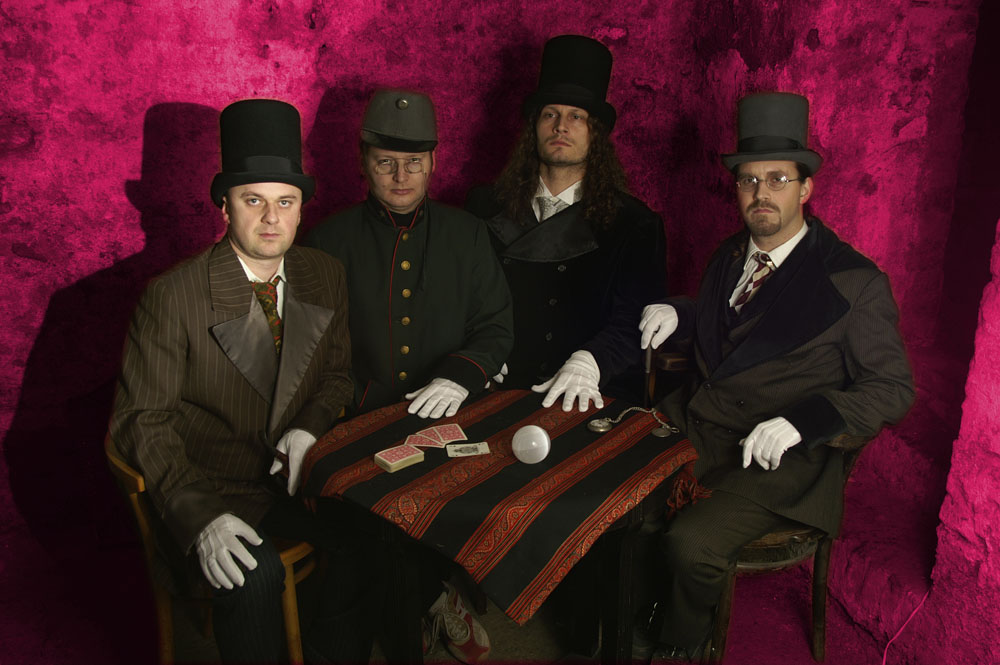
Promotional photo for Rock'n'Freud (2007). L–R: BlackDrum, Klíma, Poly, Tudy

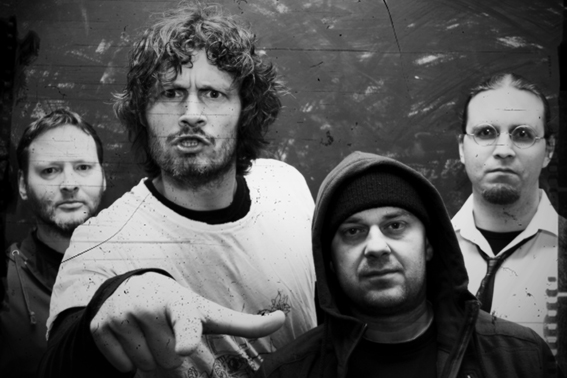
Insania in 2012. L–R: Klíma, Poly, BlackDrum, Tudy

In 2007, Insania issued the album Rock 'n' Freud, which won an Anděl award in the Hard & Heavy category. Until OUT, the band's lyrics had been a mix of English and Czech; all subsequent releases have been sung entirely in Czech. It spawned two singles, "Je mrtvá" and "Večer, kdy Freud zpíval basem", with accompanying music videos.

The band's next record was Kult hyeny (2010), for which two videos were produced: "Volný radikál" and "Pověsíme celebrity!"

=== Zapal dům poraž strom..., Na počátku byl spam (2013–2019) ===
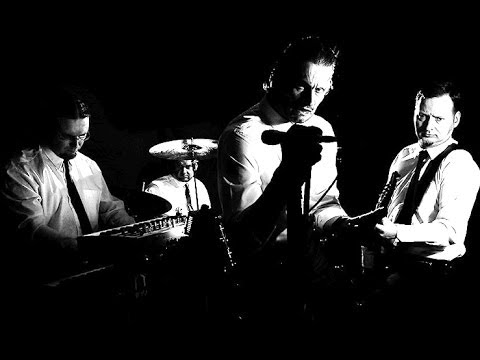
Insania in the video for "Božská komedie" from Zapal dům poraž strom... (2013)

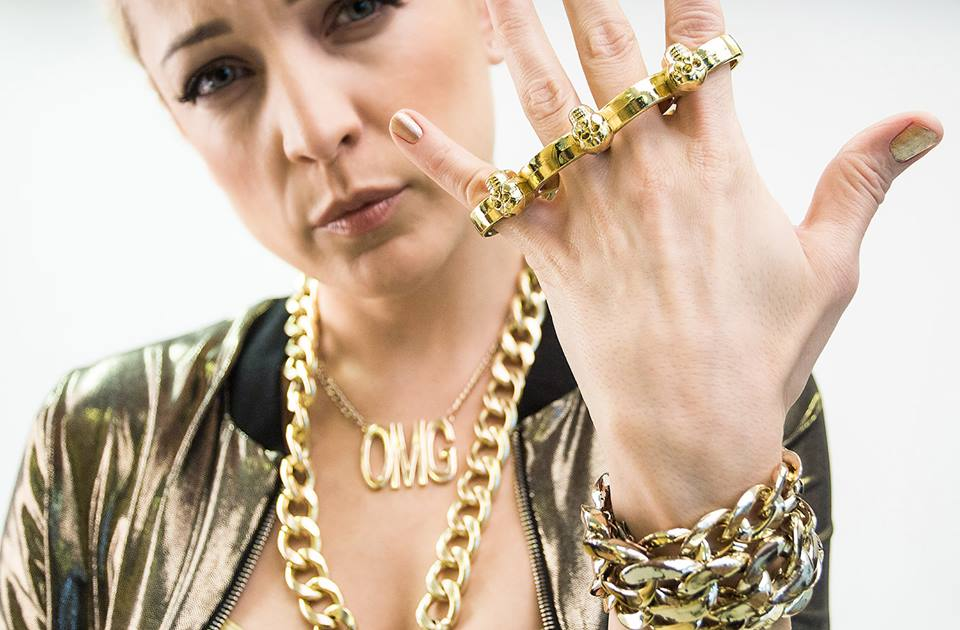
Adéla Elbel in the video for "Ať kypí žluč", from Na počátku byl spam (2017)

The band's eighth studio album, Zapal dům poraž strom..., was released in November 2013. Reviewing it for Novinky.cz, journalist Jaroslav Špulák described the band's style as "forceful indie rock with pop overlaps", while praising the album's strong melodies and attractive lyrics. The record was very well received overall, winning two Anděl awards in the Hard & Heavy and Punk & Hardcore categories. Two music videos were produced to promote it: "Božská komedie" and the animated "Ať shoří v pekle všechny kapely světa!"

In 2017, Insania issued Na počátku byl spam. The CD version included bonus remixes by Jan Vozáry, Vladivojna La Chia, Bodyia, Jan P. Muchow, and Midi Lidi. The record was praised for its hooks, black humour, and sound, though some critics argued that it showed little stylistic development and was less sharp musically and lyrically than earlier albums. Videos followed for "Joe si nepohlídal záda" and "Ať kypí žluč".

=== GRRRotesky, upcoming album (2020–present) ===
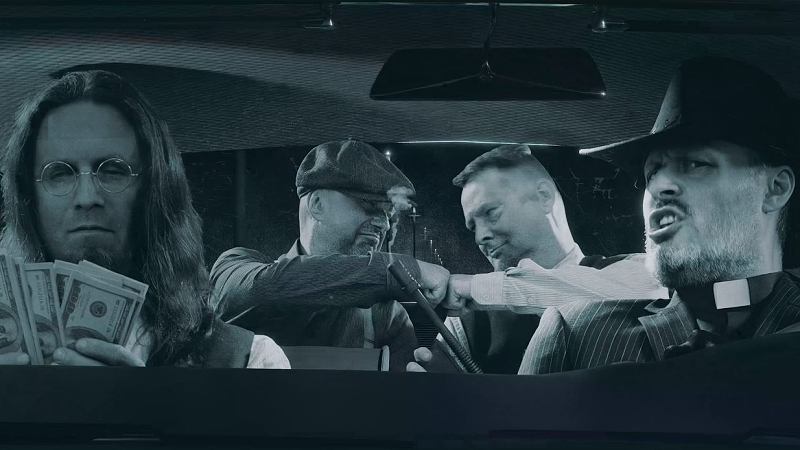
Still from the video for "Jedeme peklo", from GRRRotesky (2023)

In 2020, Insania released a lyric video for the song "Haka starýho Nicka" and an animated one for "Bomba v kabaretu". The album GRRRotesky followed in February 2022, winning that year's Anděl award in the Rock category. Videos from the album included "Vytěsňuju", "Narvi svůj testosteron jinam", "Nasyp to do mě", "Placatej svět", and "Jedeme peklo".

In 2023, the band performed at Rock for People in Hradec Králové.

In March 2025, they released a music video for a new song, titled "Cukr a Bitch", from their upcoming, yet untitled album. The band stated that the new record was planned for release in late 2026.

=== Kacířův kancionál ===
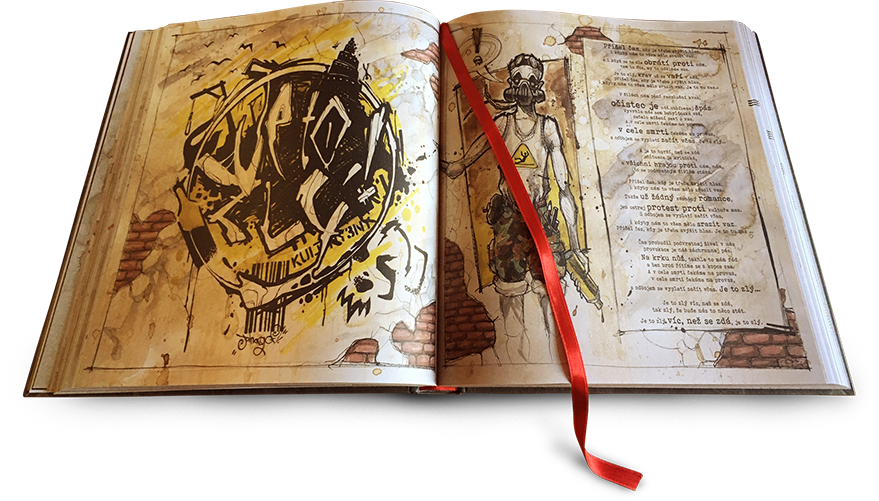
An open copy of Kacířův kancionál (2019)

In April 2019, the band's frontman, Petr "Poly" Pálenský, published the book Kacířův kancionál ("the heretic's hymnbook"), which combines poetry, lyrics inspired by the work of Insania, social commentary, and graphic elements. It includes motifs from religion, philosophy, and pop culture, and features historical and allegorical figures, such as Friedrich Nietzsche, Umberto Eco, God, the Devil, as well as coded references to the work of Jaroslav Foglar. The interactive publication includes hidden elements only accessible via a proprietary mobile app.

== Band members ==
Current

- Petr "Poly" Pálenský – vocals, guitar
- Petr "Tudy" Holubář – keyboards
- Radovan "Klíma" Kříž – bass
- Rostislav "BlackDrum" Mozga – drums

Past

- Martin "Vrba" Vrbík
- Marek Loučka
- Jan "Calvera" Krátký
- Martin Maleček

== Discography ==
Studio albums

- Crossfade (1994)
- God Is Insane ... Join Him! (1996)
- Virtu-ritual (1998)
- Trans-Mystic Anarchy (2001)
- OUT (2004)
- Rock 'N' Freud (2007)
- Kult hyeny (2010)
- Zapal dům poraž strom... (2013)
- Na počátku byl spam (2017)
- GRRRotesky (2022)

EPs

- Vertigo (1993)
- Caught Red-Handed (1995)
- Woodoo Astrology (1997)

Other albums

- R.U.Dead? (demo, 1992)
- Recycling & Live in Seattle (2000)
- Tamto remixuje Insanii (remixes, 2001)

== Awards ==
- Anděl award, Hard & Heavy – Rock 'n' Freud (2007)
- Anděl Award, Hard & Heavy – Zapal dům poraž strom... (2013)
- Anděl Award, Punk & Hard Core – Zapal dům poraž strom... (2013)
- Anděl Award, Rock Album of the Year – GRRRotesky (2022)
