= Tiara (album) =

2018 album by Seventh Wonder

Studio album by Seventh Wonder
- Released: 12 October 2018
- Recorded: 2016–2017
- Genre: Progressive metal, power metal
- Length: 69:56
- Label: Frontiers

Seventh Wonder chronology
The Great Escape (2010)	Tiara (2018)	The Testament (2022)

Tiara is the fifth studio album and the second concept album (after Mercy Falls) by Swedish progressive metal band Seventh Wonder, released on 12 October 2018. It is the band's first studio album in almost eight years since The Great Escape (2010) and their first album with drummer Stefan Norgren, who joined the band in 2011.

== Track listing ==
All songs composed by Seventh Wonder.

1. "Arrival" – 1:30
2. "The Everones" – 6:13
3. "Dream Machines" – 5:38
4. "Against the Grain" – 6:58
5. "Victorious" – 4:55
6. "Tiara's Song (Farewell Pt. 1)" – 7:16
7. "Goodnight (Farewell Pt. 2)" – 7:10
8. "Beyond Today (Farewell Pt. 3)" – 5:06
9. "The Truth" – 4:17
10. "By the Light of the Funeral Pyres" – 3:54
11. "Damnation Below" – 6:44
12. "Procession" – 0:45
13. "Exhale" – 9:30

== Personnel ==
All information from the album booklet.

Seventh Wonder

- Tommy Karevik – vocals, lyrics, producer
- Andreas Söderin – keyboard
- Johan Liefvendahl – guitar
- Andreas Blomqvist – bass, lyrics, producer
- Stefan Norgren – drums, additional vocals

Additional musicians

- Jenny Karevik – additional vocals, co-lead vocals (track 9)
- Johan Larsson – additional vocals, artwork
- Kobra Paige – additional vocals
- Michele Coombe – additional vocals
- Jenna Blomqvist – additional vocals
- Arto Järvelä – violin

Production

- Øyvind Larsen – mixing
- Jens Bogren – mastering

== Charts ==
Chart (2018)	Peak position
Belgian Albums (Ultratop Wallonia)	150
Swiss Albums (Schweizer Hitparade)	86
