= Waiting in the Wings (Seventh Wonder album) =

Studio album by Seventh Wonder
- Released: August 24, 2006
- Recorded: February – March 2006
- Studio: Sound vs. Science Studios
- Genre: Progressive metal, power metal
- Length: 55:54
- Label: Lion Music

Seventh Wonder chronology
Become (2005)	Waiting in the Wings (2006)	Mercy Falls (2008)

Professional ratings
Review scores
Source	Rating
Metal Crypt	4.6 stars on a 5 point scale
Rock Reviews	7.5/10 stars

Waiting in the Wings is the second studio album by Swedish progressive metal band Seventh Wonder. It is the first Seventh Wonder release to feature Tommy Karevik on vocals.

== Track listing ==
1. "Star of David" - 5:13
2. "Taint the Sky" - 6:25
3. "Waiting in the Wings" - 9:18
4. "Banish the Wicked" - 5:36
5. "Not an Angel" - 6:45
6. "Devil's Inc." - 7:14
7. "Walking Tall" - 4:20
8. "The Edge of My Blade" - 6:32
9. "Pieces" - 4:31

== Personnel ==
All information in the album booklet.

Seventh Wonder

- Tommy Karevik – vocals, producer, engineering
- Andreas Söderin – keyboard, producer, engineering
- Johan Liefvendahl – guitar, producer, engineering
- Andreas Blomqvist – bass, producer, engineering
- Johnny Sandin – drums, producer, engineering

Additional musician

- Jenny Karevik – additional vocals

Production

- Carl-André Beckston – cover art, booklet design
- Tommy Hansen – mixing, mastering
- Daniel Flores – engineering
- Patrik Forsberg – photography
