= Root (band) =

Czech black metal band

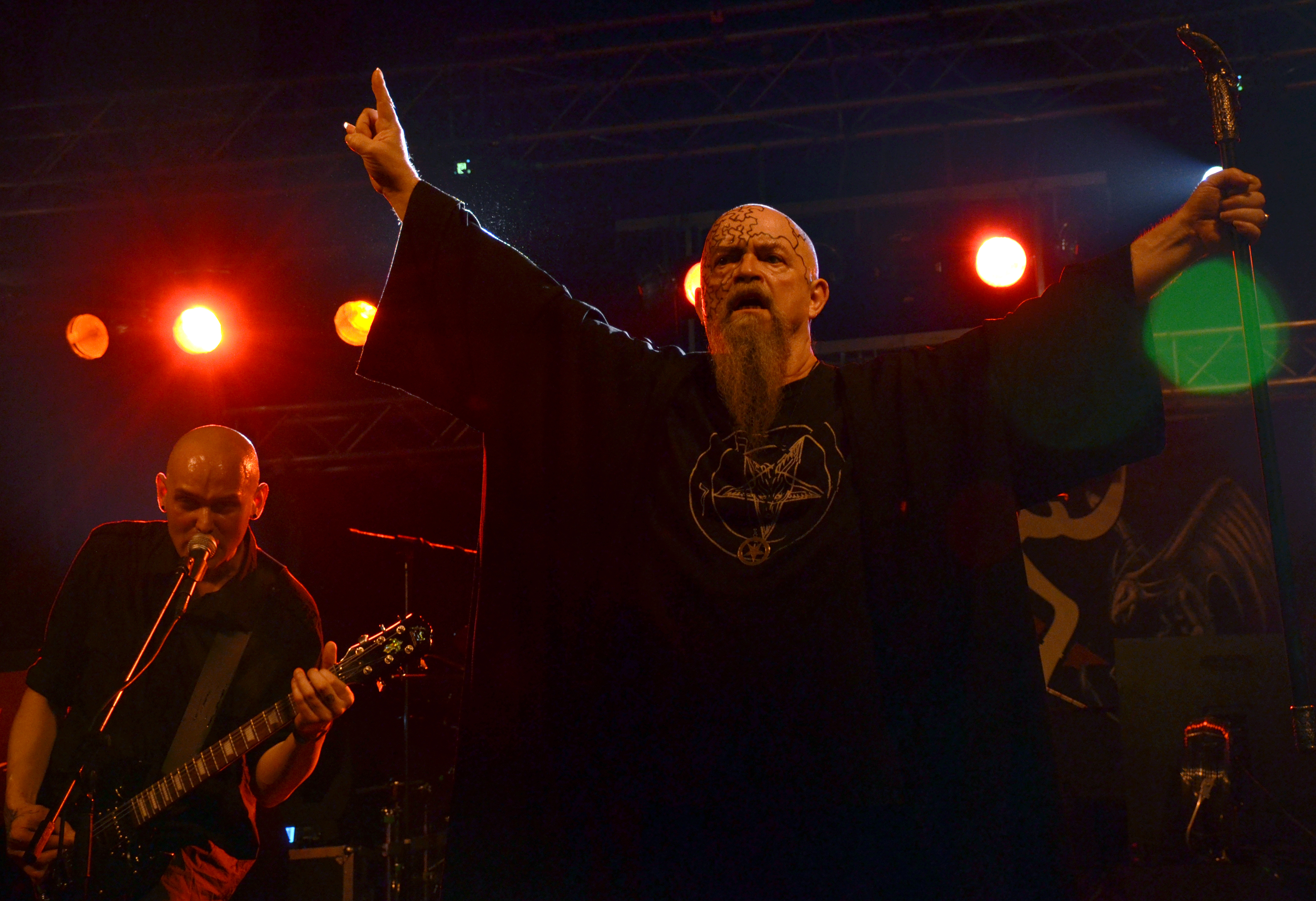
- Root performing in 2014

Background information
- Origin: Brno, Czechoslovakia
- Genres: Black metal; heavy metal
- Years active: 1987–1995; 1996–present
- Label: Redblack
- Members: Jiří "Big Boss" Valter; Aleš Dostál; Igor Hubík; Jiří Háb; Zbyněk Husa
- Past members: Robert Krčmář; Zdeněk Odehnal; Petr Kříž; Petr Pálenský; Dan Janáček; Petr Hošek; René Kostelňák; Marek Fryčák; Rostislav Mozga; Aleš Jedonek; Marek Šmerda; Jan Konečný; Peter Hrnčirík; Pavel Kubát
- Website: rootan.net

Root is a Czech black metal band from Brno, formed in 1987 by vocalist and drummer Jiří "Big Boss" Valter and guitarist/bassist Petr "Blackie" Hošek. They have released 11 studio albums, one live record, and one compilation.

== History ==
=== 1987–1995: Early years, three albums, and breakup ===
The Czech black metal band Root was formed in 1987 by vocalist and drummer Jiří "Big Boss" Valter and guitarist/bassist Petr "Blackie" Hošek, who had previously played in the group Vega together. They were joined by guitarist Zdeněk "Mr. Zet" Odehnal and singer Robert "Dr. Fe" Krčmář, and they recorded their first demo, Deep in Hell, which was ultimately not distributed. Their next demo, Reap of Hell, came out later the same year and was followed by War of Rats in 1988. Another two demos, Messengers of Darkness (with Petr "Mr. Cross" Kříž replacing Mr. Zet on guitar) and The Trial, were released in 1989. The latter saw Petr "Mr. Death" Pálenský taking over on guitar, Rostislav "Black Drum" Mozga on drums, and Big Boss, who couldn't play double bass drum, switching to vocals.

In 1990, Root issued their debut studio album, Zjevení, which included Dan "Mr. D.A.N." Janáček on guitar (having taken over from Mr. Death). Black Drum left the band a year later, and Root issued The Revelation, an English-language version of Zjevení. Their second album, Hell Symphony, followed in 1992 and was their first not to be recorded in Czech; it included René "Evil" Kostelňák on drums. Mr. D.A.N. left following the album's release. The band's third record, The Temple in the Underworld, came out a year later. The group subsequently entered a hiatus and officially split up in 1995.

=== 1996–2010: Reunion, releases, and touring ===
In 1996, in the lineup of Big Boss, Blackie, and Evil, Root released the concept album Kärgeräs, but they were only sporadically active afterward. In 1999, they reissued Zjevení and The Temple in the Underworld as a double CD and also released their fifth studio album, The Book, with guitarist Marek "Ashok" Šmerda.

In 2001, the band reissued Zjevení and Kärgeräs as a double CD and also released their next studio album, Black Seal, with bassist Igor "Igorr" Hubík. The track "Salamandra" features the vocalist Fernando Ribeiro of Moonspell. A year later, Root published Dema, a collection of their early demos as well as a recording of their 1988 Death Metal Session II concert.

In 2003, Root released the album Madness of the Graves. In 2004, founding guitarist Blackie left and was replaced by Aleš "Poison" Jedonek. That year, the band played at the Open Hell festival with Watain and Törr, among others. A year later, Evil also departed, and Marek "Deadly" Fryčák took his place. In 2006, the band released the mini-album Casilda. That year, Evil returned to the band, this time to replace Poison on guitar.

Root's seventh full-length album, Daemon Viam Invenient, came out in 2007, and the band promoted it with performances on the No Mercy Tour, with Napalm Death, Moonspell, and Behemoth; the Nedlok festival in Norway; a tour of Finland with In Aeternum; and the Halloween Party at Lisbon's Coliseu dos Recreios, along with Moonspell once more. In 2009, Deadly was replaced by Peter Hrnčirík, whose place was taken by Pavel "Paul Dread" Kubát a year later.

=== 2011–2016: Heritage of Satan, Kärgeräs – Return from Oblivion ===
In 2011, Evil left the band once more and was replaced by Jan "Hanz" Konečný. The same year, Root released the album Heritage of Satan, featuring Aura Noir and Ava Inferi guitarist Rune "Blasphemer" Eriksen, Behemoth vocalist Adam "Nergal" Darski, and Watain vocalist Erik Danielsson. A year later, the band celebrated its 25th anniversary with a concert in Brno, with the participation of a number of its former members. In 2013, they issued the compilation album Viginti Quinque Annis In Scaena.

In 2016, the band published their tenth studio album, Kärgeräs – Return from Oblivion, the sequel to 1996's Kärgeräs.

== Musical style and ideology ==
According to Legacy journalist Christian Wachter, Root have, since their beginning, maintained an occult aura. The Portuguese metal band Moonspell have mentioned Root as one of their influences. The Rock Hard journalist Björn Thorsten Jaschinski called them "occult metal pioneers". His colleague Wolf-Rüdiger Mühlmann located The Book "in the triangle of death metal, gothic metal and gloomy rock, with folklore melodies that could be interesting for fans of Katatonia, My Dying Bride, Primordial and Thine". Mühlmann described Black Seal as a mix of Mercyful Fate, Moonspell, Anathema, and old heavy metal. For Decibel magazine, the journalist Chris D. wrote, Heritage of Satan "feels less complete than, say, The Book, which is, for me at least, the best Root album to date".

Big Boss founded the Czech branch of the Church of Satan and lives according to Satanism. The Swedish black metal band Watain called them and Törr "the legendary kings of Czech black/death metal" in 2004. According to Big Boss, "the difference between us and Scandinavian groups is that I sing about Satanic magic and myths I create personally, whereas Swedes, Norwegians etc. sing about things that are already known. They therefore have another approach to these topics."

== Band members ==
=== Current ===
- Jiří "Big Boss" Valter – drums (1987–1989), vocals (1989–present)
- Aleš "Alesh A.D." Dostál – guitar (2014–present)
- Igor "Igorr" Hubík – bass (2000–present)
- Jiří Háb – guitar (2018–present)
- Zbyněk Husa – drums (2019–present)

=== Past ===
- Petr "Blackie" Hošek – guitar (1987–2004), studio bass (1987–2000)
- Robert "Dr. Fe" Krčmář – vocals (1988–1989)
- Zdeněk "Mr. Zet" Odehnal – guitar (1988)
- Petr "Mr. Cross" Kříž – guitar (1989)
- Petr "Mr. Death" Pálenský – guitar (1989)
- Rostislav "Black Drum" Mozga – drums (1989–1991)
- Dan "Mr. D.A.N." Janáček – guitar (1990–1992)
- René "Evil" Kostelňák – drums (1992–2004), guitars (2006–2011)
- Marek "Ashok" Šmerda – guitar (1999–2014)
- Aleš "Poison" Jedonek – guitar (2005–2007)
- Marek "Deadly" Fryčák – drums (2008–2009)
- Peter Hrnčirík – drums (2009–2010)
- Paul Dread – drums (2010–2019)
- Jan "Hanz" Konečný – guitar (2011–2017)

== Discography ==
=== Demos ===
Year	Name
1987	Deep in Hell
1987	Reap of Hell
1988	War of Rats
1989	Messengers from Darkness
1989	The Trial

=== Albums ===
Year	Name
1990	Zjevení (reissued in 1999)
1991	Hell Symphony (reissued in 2001)
1991	The Revelation (English-language version of Zjevení)
1992	The Temple in the Underworld
1996	Kärgeräs (reissued in 2001)
1999	The Book
2001	Black Seal
2002	Dema (2-CD demos reissue)
2003	Madness of the Graves
2006	Casilda (mini-album)
2007	Daemon Viam Invenient
2008	Capturing Sweden – Live in Falkenberg
2011	Heritage of Satan
2013	Viginti Quinque Annis In Scaena (compilation)
2016	Kärgeräs – Return from Oblivion

=== DVDs ===
Year	Name
2006	Deep in Root (double disc)

=== Contributions ===
- "Hřbitov" on Death Metal Session (1990)
