= Andreas Blomqvist =

Swedish musical artist

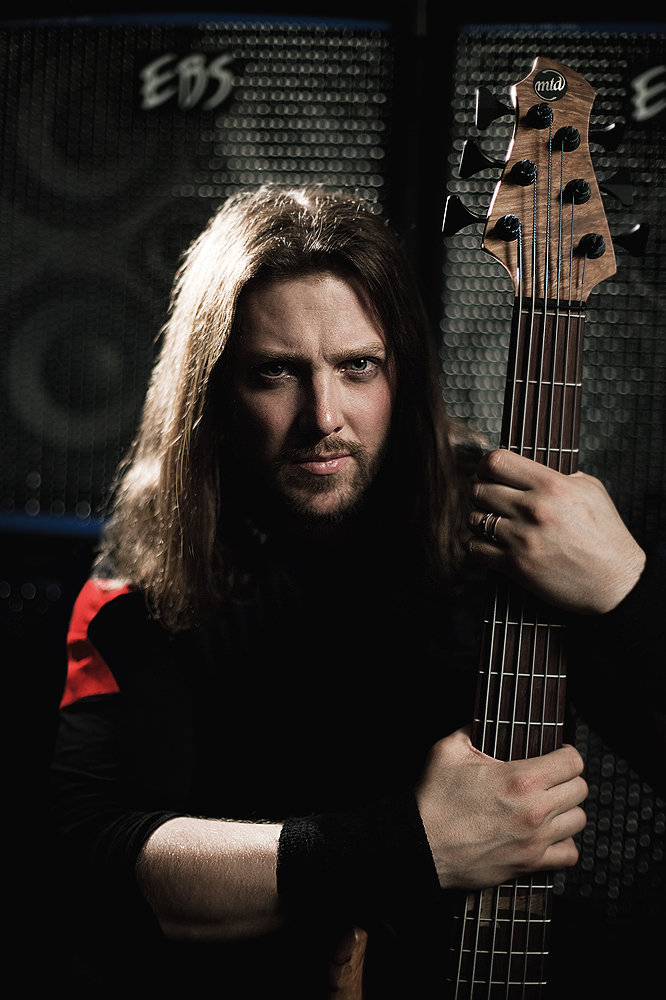

Background information
- Born: Andreas Karl Johan Blomqvist; 10 August 1978 (age 47); Backlura, Stockholm, Sweden
- Genres: heavy metal, progressive rock
- Occupations: Musician, songwriter, scientist
- Instrument: Bass
- Years active: 2000–present
- Label: Lion Music

Andreas Blomqvist is a heavy metal bassist from Stockholm, Sweden, best known for his role as the bassist and founding member of progressive metal band Seventh Wonder. Andreas formed Seventh Wonder alongside guitarist Johan Liefvendahl and drummer Johnny Sandin after their previous band fell apart. The music turned towards the side of progressive metal, and as the band was joined by keyboard player Andreas "Kyrt" Söderin late 2000, the new sound was cemented further. Two demos were recorded over the next few years (Seventh Wonder in 2001 and Temple in the Storm in 2003) and both received good press.

In 2005, Seventh Wonder released their first full-length studio album, Become. It was followed in 2006 by Waiting in the Wings. In 2008, they released the critically acclaimed concept album Mercy Falls. They followed this with the very successful The Great Escape, which was released in 2010. Their most recent studio album is Tiara, released in 2018.

Blomqvist's playing style frequently incorporates techniques such as fretboard tapping and sections of fast arpeggios, such as his bass solo in Walking Tall from Waiting in the Wings. He primarily uses a 6-string Bass Guitar for recording and live performances. On the song Long Way Home from The Great Escape, he played a fretless bass. He has listed Marcel Jacob (Talisman, Yngwie Malmsteen) and Thomas Miller (ex Symphony X) as his most important influences.

Blomqvist also does the majority of Seventh Wonder's interviews, writes much of the music and appears to have been the driving force in the band.

== Discography ==
- Seventh Wonder (2001)
- Temple in the Storm (2003)
- Become (2005)
- Waiting in the Wings (2006)
- Mercy Falls (2008)
- The Great Escape (2010)
- Welcome To Atlanta Live 2014 (2016)
- Tiara (2018)
- The Testament (2022)
