= The Testament (Seventh Wonder album) =

Studio album by Seventh Wonder
- Released: 10 June 2022
- Recorded: 2020–2021
- Genre: Power metal, progressive metal
- Length: 53:01
- Label: Frontiers

Seventh Wonder chronology
Tiara (2018)	The Testament (2022)

Professional ratings
Review scores
Source	Rating
Distorted Sound	7/10
Metal Storm	8/10
Sonic Perspectives	9.3/10

The Testament is the sixth studio album by Swedish progressive metal band Seventh Wonder, released on 10 June 2022. It is the band's first studio album in almost four years since Tiara (2018). It is the final album to feature Tommy Karevik on lead vocals.

== Track listing ==
1. "Warriors" – 4:42
2. "The Light" – 6:13
3. "I Carry the Blame" – 6:06
4. "Reflections" – 5:35
5. "The Red River" – 6:12
6. "Invincible" – 3:39
7. "Mindkiller" – 5:58
8. "Under a Clear Blue Sky" – 8:45
9. "Elegy" – 5:51

== Personnel ==
Seventh Wonder

- Tommy Karevik – vocals
- Andreas Söderin – keyboard
- Johan Liefvendahl – guitar
- Andreas Blomqvist – bass
- Stefan Norgren – drums

== Charts ==
Chart performance for The Testament
Chart (2022)	Peak position
Japanese Hot Albums (Billboard Japan)	92
