= A Mind's Portrait =

Studio debut album by Aeon Zen

Studio album by Aeon Zen
- Released: May 1, 2009
- Recorded: 2009
- Genre: Progressive metal
- Label: Time Divide Records
- Producer: Rich Hinks

Aeon Zen chronology
A Mind's Portrait (2009)	The Face of the Unknown (2010)

A Mind's Portrait is the debut album by British progressive metal group Aeon Zen, first released in May 2009 with catalogue number TDR05009001CD. The album was praised for its intricate montage of "many stylistic elements", spanning "catchy melodies, a diverse mix of songs and styles, and progressive time changes" which "run[s] through the gamut of emotions".

The album's artwork was designed by Mattias Norén, who had previously undertaken work for groups such as Outworld, Evergrey and Into Eternity, among others.

== Critical response ==
The album received generally favorable reviews from niche publications within the Progressive Metal scene. Classic Rock Magazine called the band 'a strong contender for best newcomer at the very, very least' after hearing the album while Progression Magazine called it the "debut album of the year". Elsewhere, the album was hailed as a "refreshing change" amid a stagnated field and "an album to take note of". Stylistically, the album has been compared to others in the field, notably Dream Theater

== Track listing ==
Track	Title	Writer	Duration
1	Existence	Hinks, Musto, Kravljaca	4:10
2	Time Divine	Hinks, Musto, Rue, Shepherd	4:18
3	Blinded Rain	Hinks, Musto, Green, Hemsley, Kravljaca, Whitten	6:33
4	Hope's Echo Pt. I – The Wake	Hinks, Musto, Green, Novak, Whitten	3:48
5	Hope's Echo Pt. II – The Aftermath	Hinks, Musto, Novak, Whitten	4:36
6	A Mind's Portrait	Hinks, Musto	3:44
7	The Circle's End	Hinks, Hemsley	1:52
8	Heavens Falling	Hinks, Musto, Van Schuerbeck	6:38
9	Into the Infinite	Hinks, Musto, Kravljaca, Rue	6:51
10	Goddess	Hinks	4:23
11	The Demise of the Fifth Sun	Hinks, Musto, Bouchoucha, Green, Hemsley, Kravljaca, Whitten	12:28

== Performers and album credits ==
- Rich Hinks – lead, rhythm and acoustic guitars, bass guitars, keyboards and programming, lead vocals on tracks 6 and 8, harsh and backing vocals, producer, mixer, artwork direction and design
- Lloyd Musto – drums, lead vocal on track 8 and backing vocals
- Elyes Bouchoucha – lead vocals on track 11
- Andi Kravljaca – lead vocals on track 1 and 3, guitar solo on tracks 9 and 11
- Andreas Novak – lead vocals on tracks 4 and 5
- Nils K. Rue – lead vocals on tracks 2 and 9
- Matt Shepherd – guitar solo on tracks 1 and 2
- Cristian Van Schuerbeck – keyboard solo on track 8
- Robin Springall (Repeat Performance Mastering, London, UK) – mastering
- Mattias Norén – album art
- Toby SingL Ho, Dan Towers, Perrine Perez Fuentes, Göran G. Johansson, Per Stian Johnsen – photography
- Kevin Codfert and Jorn Viggo Lofstad – technical assistance
