= Seventh Wonder =

Swedish progressive metal band

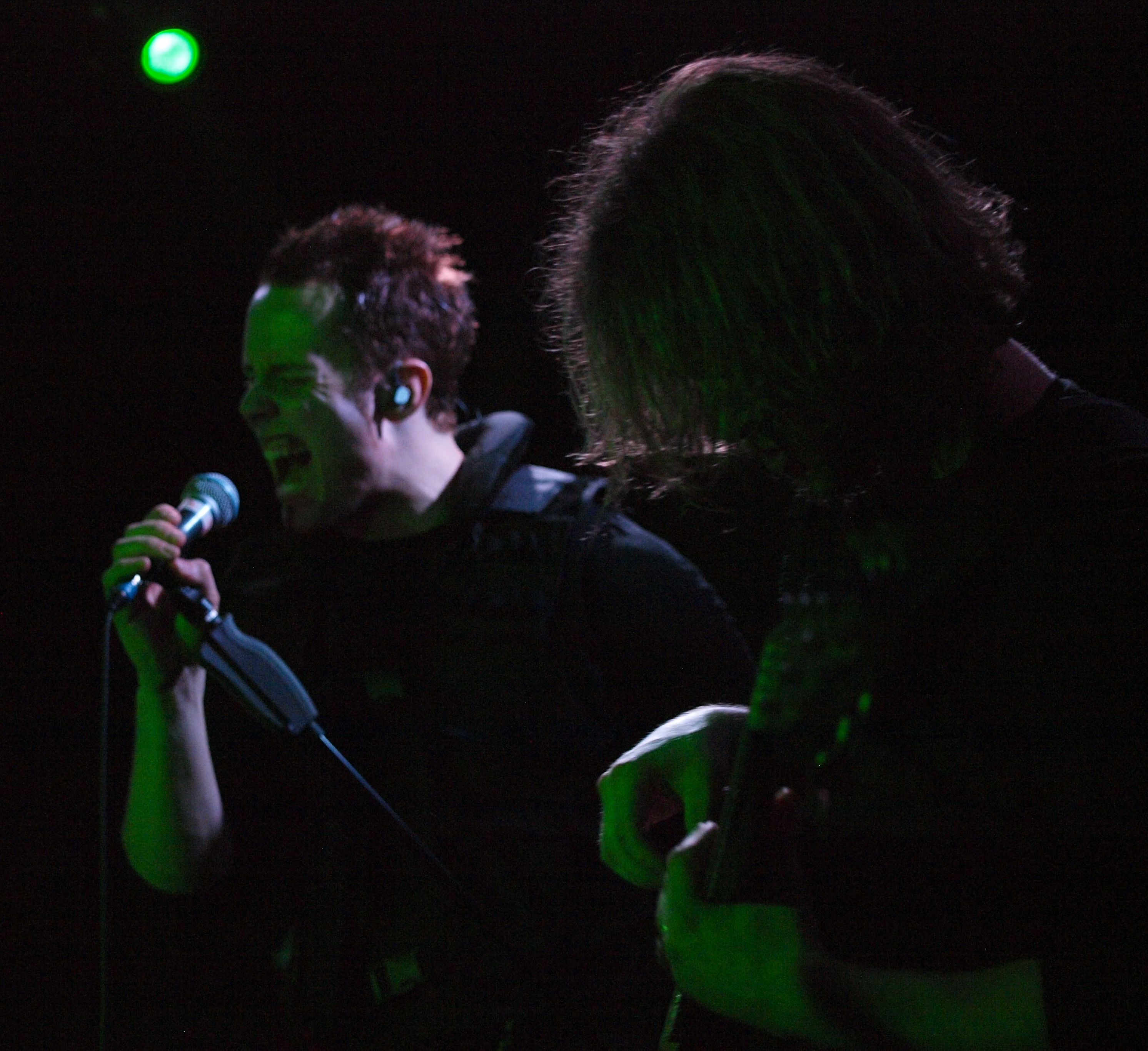
- Seventh Wonder performing in Trieste

Background information
- Origin: Stockholm, Sweden
- Genres: Progressive metal, power metal
- Years active: 2000–present
- Labels: Lion Music (2004–2016), Frontiers (2016–present)
- Members: Andreas Blomqvist; Johan Liefvendahl; Andreas "Kyrt" Söderin; Stefan Norgren; Mattias Olofsson
- Past members: Johnny Sandin; Ola Halén; Andi Kravljaca; Tommy Karevik
- Website: Seventhwonder.se

Seventh Wonder is a Swedish progressive metal band from Stockholm, formed in 2000.

== History ==
Seventh Wonder was formed in 2000 by bass player Andreas Blomqvist, guitarist Johan Liefvendahl and drummer Johnny Sandin after their previous band fell apart. Their music started to develop in the direction of progressive metal and as the band was joined by keyboard player Andreas Kyrt Söderin in late 2000, the new sound was cemented further. Two demos were recorded, the first in 2001 (Seventh Wonder) and the second in 2003 (Temple In The Storm).

Many singers have come and gone in Seventh Wonder over the years, among others Ola Halén of power metal band Insania Sthlm. The longest lasting member in the past was Andi Kravljaca (ex: Heave, Elsesphere, now Silent Call), and it was with Kravljaca at the microphone that the band recorded their debut album Become (released in 2005), after landing a record deal with Finland's Lion Music. Prior to the release of Become in 2005, Tommy Karevik joined the band. Become was well received by the press. However, the band and Andi decided to part ways shortly after the recording process had ended and once more the search for a singer started.

The next album, entitled Waiting in the Wings, was recorded in 2006 and was mixed and mastered by Tommy Hansen. Waiting in the Wings got even better reviews than Become did, scoring multiple top scores of 10 out of 10.

2007 was a year of writing new material and playing live. During 2007 Seventh Wonder played in Sweden, Denmark, Norway, England and the Netherlands together with acts such as Jorn Lande, Pagan's Mind, Queensryche, Testament, Sun Caged and Redemption. In August 2007 the band parted ways with Intromental Management, but continued to work with Lion Music.

Seventh Wonder released their next album, Mercy Falls, on 12 September 2008. It is a concept album about a man who drops into a coma after a car crash and dreams of a place called Mercy Falls, while his family tries in vain to wake him from his sleep. In December 2009, they began writing material for The Great Escape. They entered the studio in April 2010, and posted regular updates on their official forum and YouTube channel. The album The Great Escape was released on 3 December 2010, and was very well received by fans and critics.

Before the release of the album, drummer Johnny Sandin quit the band for private reasons. On 25 April 2011, Seventh wonder announced that Stefan Norgren had replaced Sandin as the band's drummer. In June 2012, Tommy Karevik was announced as Kamelot's new singer, but stated that he has no intention of leaving Seventh Wonder.

On 7 September 2013 the band announced they would be recording a live DVD at 2014 ProgPower USA Festival, performing songs from their album Mercy Falls in its entirety for the first and final time. In 2016, the band signed with Italian record company Frontiers Records to release the live CD/DVD called Welcome To Atlanta Live 2014 on 23 September 2016 and also a new studio album that is expected to be released in 2018. On 28 October 2017, the band announced through their Facebook that the album would be titled Tiara. The album was released on 12 October 2018.

On 16 March 2022, the band announced that the album The Testament would be released on 10 June. Following the release of the album, Karevik announced his departure from the band on 12 June 2023.

On 14 October 2026, the band announced that the album VII will be released on 29 January 2027, their first album with new vocalist Mattias Olofsson.

== Band members ==
=== Current ===
- Andreas Blomqvist – bass (2000–present)
- Johan Liefvendahl – guitar (2000–present)
- Andreas "Kyrt" Söderin – keyboards (2000–present)
- Stefan Norgren – drums (2011–present)
- Mattias Olofsson – vocals (2026–present)

=== Former ===
- Johnny Sandin – drums (2000–2010)
- Ola Halén – vocals (2001–2002)
- Andi Kravljaca – vocals (2002–2005)
- Tommy Karevik – vocals (2005–2023)

== Discography ==
=== Studio albums ===
- Become (2005)
- Waiting in the Wings (2006)
- Mercy Falls (2008)
- The Great Escape (2010)
- Tiara (2018)
- The Testament (2022)
- VII (2027)

=== Live albums ===
- Welcome to Atlanta Live 2014 (2016)

=== Singles ===
- Tiara (Acoustic) (2019)
- Warriors (2022)
