= Tommy Karevik =

Swedish singer (born 1981)

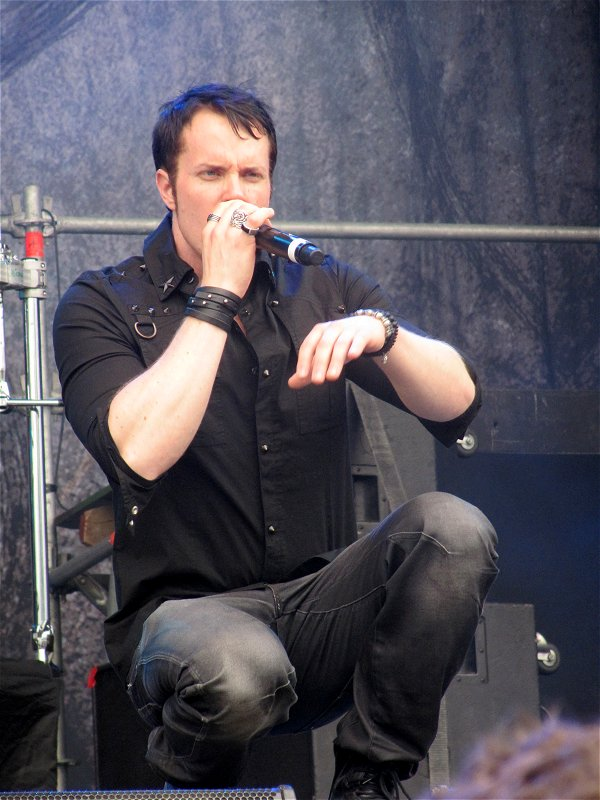
- Karevik with Kamelot in 2012

Background information
- Born: 1 November 1981 (age 44); Stockholm, Sweden
- Genres: Power metal, progressive metal, symphonic metal
- Occupation: Singer
- Years active: 2004–present
- Member of: Kamelot; Firecracker
- Formerly of: Vindictiv; Seventh Wonder

Tommy Karevik (born 1 November 1981) is a Swedish metal vocalist. He is the lead singer of Kamelot and former lead vocalist of Seventh Wonder from 2005 to 2023.

He also appeared on Ayreon's 2013 album The Theory of Everything, in which he portrayed the main character. He appeared once again on the 2017 album The Source as The Opposition Leader and in 2020 on Transitus as Daniel.

== Early life ==
Karevik was born in 1981 in Botkyrka, Sweden. He began singing at a young age, and was a member of his elementary school's choir. At college, Karevik studied nature and science.

== Career ==
=== Seventh Wonder ===
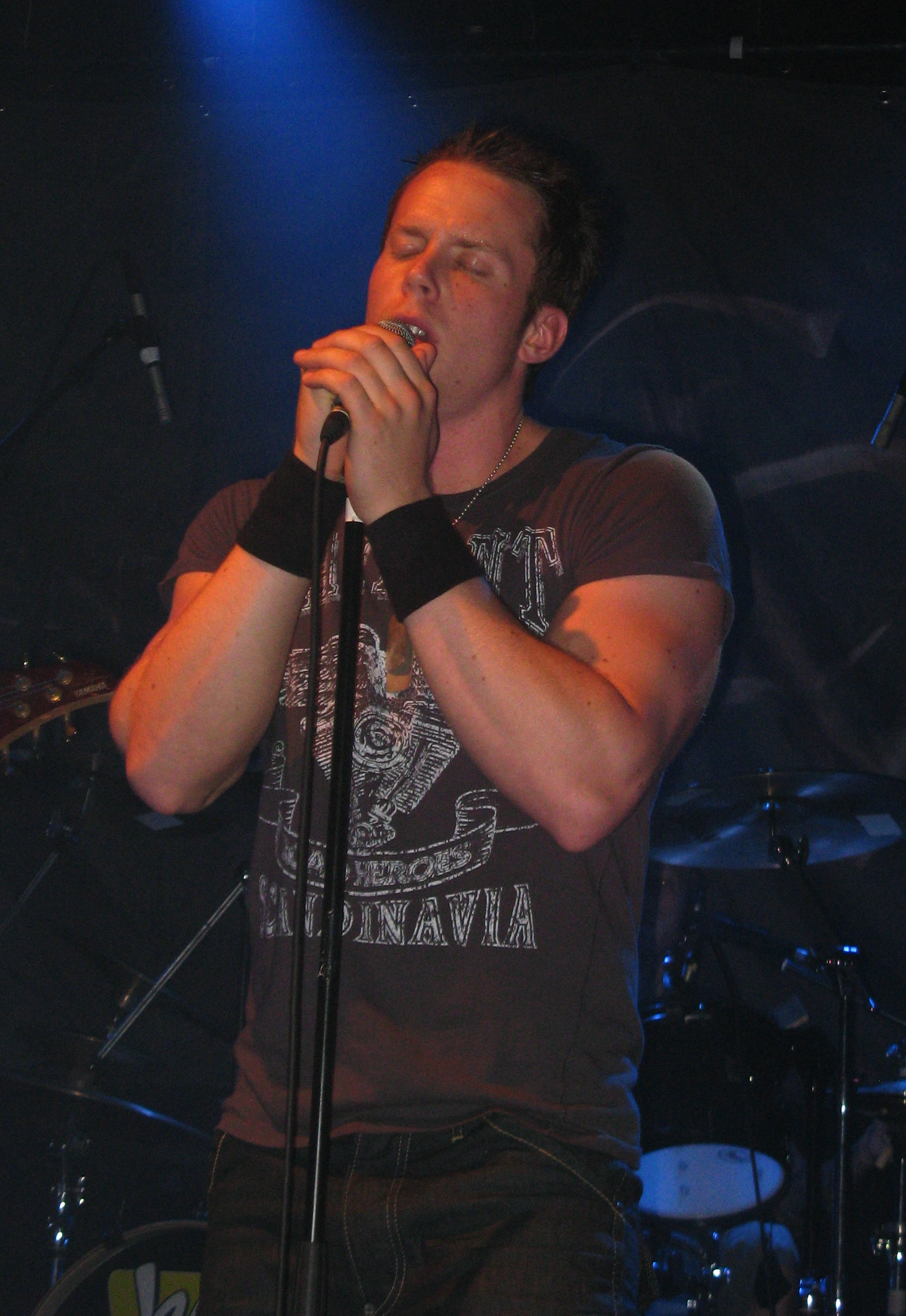
Karevik with Seventh Wonder in 2007

In 2004, Tommy Karevik recorded a few songs with Vindictiv. Shortly after, he left the band for progressive metal band Seventh Wonder, prior to the release of their debut album Become in 2005. Despite the warm reception of the album at the time of its release, the band members have stated that they were generally unhappy with the album due to its poor mixing. Once Karevik joined the band, they toured briefly to promote the album.

The band then returned to the studio, eager to produce fresh material with their new vocalist. The resulting album was Waiting in the Wings, released in 2006. The album was met with very positive reviews.

In 2008, Seventh Wonder released the concept album Mercy Falls, and in 2010 they released The Great Escape.

Studio footage from The Great Escape recording sessions were posted on the band's official forum and YouTube channel. In these videos, it is explained that Karevik was experiencing problems with his voice during the recording of the album, and had to regularly apply a special spray to his throat in order to continue recording his vocals.

After Karevik was announced as the new vocalist for Kamelot in 2012, the band only reunited in 2013 to play shows at some festivals and to announce they would be recording a live DVD at 2014 ProgPower USA Festival, performing songs from their album Mercy Falls in its entirety.

In 2016, the band signed with Italian record company Frontiers Records to release the live CD/DVD called Welcome To Atlanta Live 2014 on September 23, 2016, and also a new studio album to be released in 2018. Later, the band announced the album would be titled Tiara. It was released on October 12, 2018.

Following the release of the band's sixth studio album, The Testament, Karevik announced his departure from Seventh Wonder on 12 June 2023.

=== Kamelot ===
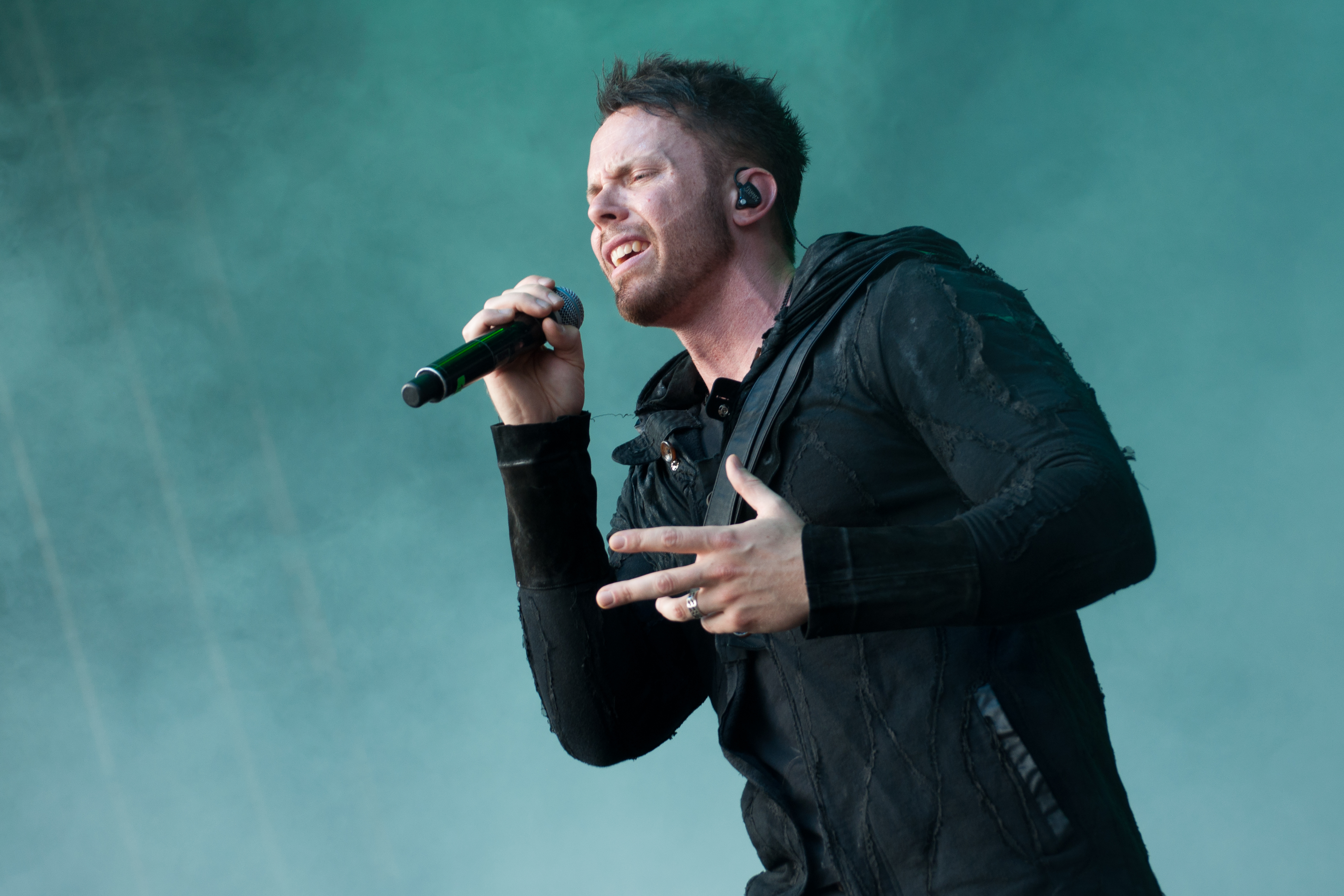
Karevik performing with Kamelot at Masters of Rock in 2018

In 2011, Karevik performed as a guest vocalist for the American symphonic metal band Kamelot. Kamelot was forced to tour without their longtime vocalist Roy Khan, who was unable to perform due to personal problems and health issues. Khan was replaced on tour by Italian singer Fabio Lione of Rhapsody of Fire and during the tour Kamelot announced that Khan had left the band. During Kamelot's tour of Europe, Karevik joined the crew, singing mostly backing vocals, but also performing solo on the songs EdenEcho and Center of the Universe.

On June 22, 2012, Kamelot announced that Karevik had joined as lead singer, replacing Roy Khan.

=== Ayreon ===
On August 31, 2013, Karevik was announced as a guest vocalist, playing the lead role, in the progressive rock opera project Ayreon's album The Theory of Everything. On December 15, 2016, Karevik was announced as "The Opposition Leader" on Ayreon's release, The Source released in 2017. He was presented by Arjen Lucassen as "one of the best singers in the world right now... "

== Personal life ==
Karevik's first contact with metal music was through a classmate. Inspired by his classmate's ability to play guitar, Karevik soon picked up a guitar for the first time. During the days that followed, Karevik wrote his first song in Swedish.

In an interview with vocal coach, Elizabeth Zharoff of The Charismatic Voice, he told that, before discovering metal, he listened mostly to pop music as a teenager. Karevik also added that great vocalists like Mariah Carey and Whitney Houston, had surely influenced his vocal style. He later adapted this soulful singing style to metal music.

Karevik cited singers Jørn Lande, Russell Allen, James LaBrie and the bands Queen and Dream Theater as some of his main influences.

Away from his musical work, Karevik was a full-time firefighter back in Sweden up until his move to Canada.

He also has a sister named Jenny, who appears as a vocalist in a few Seventh Wonder songs throughout his time in the band.

He is in a relationship with Kobra and the Lotus singer Kobra Paige, as seen from their social media accounts. The two were married on April 4, 2020.

== Discography ==
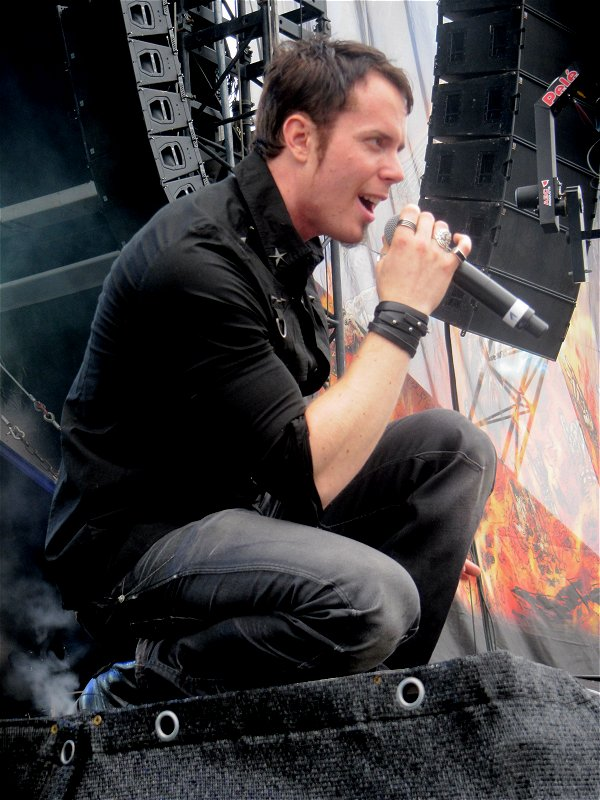
Karevik in 2012

=== Seventh Wonder ===
- Waiting in the Wings (2006)
- Mercy Falls (2008)
- The Great Escape (2010)
- Welcome To Atlanta Live 2014 (2016)
- Tiara (2018)
- The Testament (2022)

=== Firecracker ===
- Born of Fire (2010)

=== PelleK ===
- My Demons (2010)
- Bag of Tricks (2012)

=== Kamelot ===
- Silverthorn (2012)
- Haven (2015)
- The Shadow Theory (2018)
- I Am the Empire – Live from the 013 (2020, live)
- The Awakening (2023)
- Dark Asylum (2026)

=== Ayreon ===
- The Theory of Everything (2013)
- The Source (2017)
- Ayreon Universe – The Best of Ayreon Live (2018)
- Transitus (2020)

=== Avantasia ===
- Here Be Dragons (2025)
