= The Great Escape (Seventh Wonder album) =

Studio album by Seventh Wonder
- Released: December 3, 2010
- Recorded: April – September 2010
- Studio: Studio Wonderland; Studio Nyckelbräda
- Genre: Progressive metal power metal
- Length: 67:21
- Label: Lion Music
- Producer: Johan Larsson & Seventh Wonder

Seventh Wonder chronology
Mercy Falls (2008)	The Great Escape (2010)	Tiara (2018)

The Great Escape is the fourth album by Swedish progressive metal band Seventh Wonder. It was recorded over the Spring and Summer of 2010, and was released on December 3, 2010. It is also the last album recorded with Johnny Sandin on drums, as he left the band for personal reasons after the recording and subsequent shows. "Alley Cat" is the first Seventh Wonder song to have an accompanying music video from the band.

The 30-minute title track The Great Escape is the first (and so far only) song by the band to be longer than 10 minutes. It is an epic song based on the poems 'Aniara' by Swedish Nobel laureate Harry Martinson. It deals with the tragedy of a spaceship which, originally bound for Mars with a cargo of surviving colonists from a ravaged and destroyed Earth, is ejected from the Solar System and becomes entangled in an existential struggle. The first track 'Wiseman' doubles loosely as a prequel to the events of 'The Great Escape'.

== Track listing ==
Lyrics by Blomqvist/Karevik. Music & arrangements by Seventh Wonder.

No.	Title	Length
1.	"Wiseman"	5:42
2.	"Alley Cat"	6:06
3.	"The Angelmaker"	8:29
4.	"King of Whitewater"	7:20
5.	"Long Way Home"	4:26
6.	"Move on Through"	5:04
7.	"The Great Escape": "I. ...And the Earth Wept"; "II. Poisoned Land"; "III. Leaving Home"; "IV. Take-Off"; "V. A Turn for the Worse"; "VI. A New Balance"; "VII. Death of the Goddesses"; "VIII. The Age of Confusion: Despair"; "IX. The Age of Confusion: Lust"; "X. The Age of Confusion: Reason"; "XI. The Aftermath"; "XII. Dining on Ashes"; "XIII. The Curtain Falls"	30:14
Total length:		67:21

Bonus track
No.	Title	Length
8.	"In the Blink of an Eye" (re-recorded version from Become)	6:28

== Personnel ==
All information from the album booklet.

Seventh Wonder

- Tommy Karevik – vocals, lyrics
- Andreas Söderin – keyboard
- Johan Liefvendahl – guitar
- Andreas Blomqvist – bass, lyrics
- Johnny Sandin – drums

Additional musicians

- Johan Larsson – additional vocals, recording, cover art, photography
- Arto Järvela – violin on "King of Whitewater"
- Jenny Karevik – female vocals

Production

- Erik Mårtensson – mixing, mastering
