= The Face of the Unknown =

Studio album by Aeon Zen
- Released: October 12, 2010
- Recorded: 2010
- Genre: Progressive metal
- Label: Time Divide Records
- Producer: Rich Hinks

Aeon Zen chronology
A Mind's Portrait (2009)	The Face of the Unknown (2010)	Enigma (2013)

The Face of the Unknown is the second album by British progressive metal group Aeon Zen. Reviews were generally extremely positive, noting the "uplifting" nature of the record.

== Track listing ==
Track	Title	
1	Salvation	10:31
2	Visions	3:58
3	The Heart of the Sun	7:12
4	Crystal Skies	8:13
5	Natural Selection	4:49
6	The Face of the Unknown	7:00
7	You're Not Alone	5:22
8	My Sacrifice	5:11
9	Start Over	4:26
10	Redemption's Shadow	7:01

== Performers and album credits ==
- Rich Hinks - lead, rhythm and acoustic guitars, bass guitars, keyboards and programming. Lead (tracks 7, 8 and 9), harsh and backing vocals, producer, mixer, artwork direction and design
- Nick D'Virgilio (vocals, track 4)
- Michael Eriksen (vocals, tracks 1 and 3)
- Jem Godfrey (vocals, track 5)
- Andi Kravljaca (vocals, tracks 2 and 6)
- Matt Shepherd (guitar solo, track 2)
- Cristian Van Schuerbeck (keyboard solo, track 6)
- Jonny Tatum (vocals, tracks 8 and 10)
