= Kärgeräs – Return from Oblivion =

Studio album by Root
- Released: 25 November 2016
- Genre: Black metal, heavy metal
- Length: 47:35
- Label: Agonia Records
- Producer: Big Boss

Root chronology
Heritage of Satan (2011)	Kärgeräs – Return from Oblivion (2016)

Professional ratings
Review scores
Source	Rating
Last Rites	Favorable
Echoes and Dust	Favorable
Dead Rhetoric	8/10

Kärgeräs – Return from Oblivion is the tenth studio album by Czech black/heavy metal band Root. Originally announced on 28 September 2016, it was eventually released on 25 November through Agonia Records, and is their first studio album in 5 years since Heritage of Satan. As the title implies, it is a concept album that serves as a sequel to their previous 1996 release, Kärgeräs. Two songs off the album, "Life of Demon" and "Moment of Fright", were released in advance as teasers on their record label's official Bandcamp page as well as on YouTube.

The album's cover art was provided by Thomas Bruno; it originally began as a portrait of the band's frontman, Jiří "Big Boss" Valter, but the band liked it so much they decided to use it as the cover, and Bruno added more details to the portrait. It was recorded, mixed and mastered at the Shaark Studio in South Moravia, where the band also worked on the original Kärgeräs, The Book and Black Seal.

It was the band's first release since The Book with guitarist Aleš "Alesh A.D." Dostál; he left the band in 1999 but re-joined it in 2014.

On 13 January 2017 the band released a music video for "Black Iris" – their first music video since "In the Heart of Darkness", off the 2003 album Madness of the Graves. A second music video, for "Moment of Fright", was released on 24 February 2017.

== Critical reception ==
The album was positively received since its release. Writing for Last Rites webzine, Zach Duvall praised it as being "the best Root album since the departure of Blackie", complementing with: "[E]ven with the album working more as a great EP than a good album, Return from Oblivion contains the best Root material in over a decade. This is not exactly the highest of praise considering the points of comparison, and the album is obviously far from perfect, but it should still be greeted as a welcome addition to the collections of Root die-hards". Guido Segers of Echoes and Dust noticed that "Root is going for storytelling, for theatrics and an epic feeling on this tenth full-length album. No instrumental acrobatics or brutality, but just some beautiful music. If that means sounding a bit cheesy now and then or having some riffs that seem rather tame, like on 'New Empire', that's all fine. Root is not for those that need reality, Kärgeräs II is for the dreamers and lovers of epic fantasy. That means it might not be as musically progressive as it could be, but the nostalgia of a good story is never wrong".

== Track listing ==
All lyrics are written by Big Boss.

No.	Title	Length
1.	"Life of Demon"	4:53
2.	"Osculum Infame"	4:01
3.	"Moment of Fright"	3:15
4.	"The Book of Death"	5:10
5.	"Black Iris"	4:43
6.	"Moment of Hope"	6:30
7.	"The Key to the Empty Room"	6:13
8.	"New Empire"	5:15
9.	"Up to the Down" (instrumental)	3:35
10.	"Do You Think Is It the End?"	3:48

== Personnel ==
- Big Boss (Jiří Valter) – vocals, guitar, production
- Alesh A.D. (Aleš Dostál) – guitar
- Igor Hubík – bass
- Paul Dread (Pavel Kubát) – drums
- Jan Konečný – guitar
- Thomas Bruno – cover art
