= Heritage of Satan =

Studio album by Root
- Released: 25 October 2011
- Recorded: May/June 2011
- Genres: Black metal, heavy metal
- Label: Agonia Records
- Producers: Big Boss, Ashok

Root chronology
Daemon Viam Invenient (2007)	Heritage of Satan (2011)	Kärgeräs – Return from Oblivion (2016)

Professional ratings
Review scores
Source	Rating
Blabbermouth	7/10
Metal Reviews	73/100
Metal Blogs	14/20

Heritage of Satan is the ninth studio album by the Czech black/heavy metal band Root, released on 25 October 2011 by Agonia Records. It was the band's first album to be released by Agonia and their last with the guitarist Marek "Ashok" Šmerda, who left the band three years later to join Cradle of Filth. The album uses many guest musicians, such as Erik Danielsson from Watain (who also provided its cover art), Nergal from Behemoth and Blasphemer from Mayhem, Aura Noir and Ava Inferi.

== Critical reception ==
The album received mixed to positive reviews on its release. Scott Alisoglu, writing for Blabbermouth, gave it 7 out of 10, saying, "[It] offers a range of variations on that classic Scandinavian theme, not least of which includes a good amount of black 'n roll, straight-up grooves, some gothic shading and creative oddities, making for an album that stands apart from the pack, if not always in a way that will pull the listener in for the long term."

Metal Reviews was more critical of the album, giving it 73 out of 100 and calling it a "fun album at best, not a brilliant one. Big Boss is on decent form, his malevolent deep growl as hair-raising as ever, yet the songwriting is somewhat lacking, being adequate rather than full of the spinechilling anthems that we've come to expect from the band".

Metal Blogs praised the album for its mixture of genres such as black metal, sludge metal and punk rock, but criticized the length of its introduction track, ultimately giving it 14 out of 20.

== Track listing ==
All lyrics are written by Big Boss.

No.	Title	Length
1.	"Introprincipio"	5:53
2.	"In Nomine Sathanas" (feat. Nergal and Erik Danielsson)	2:49
3.	"Legacy of Ancestors"	3:42
4.	"Revenge of Hell"	4:30
5.	"Darksome Prophet"	3:45
6.	"Fiery Message" (feat. Erik Danielsson)	5:18
7.	"Son of Satan"	3:24
8.	"His Coming"	4:41
9.	"Greetings from the Abyss" (feat. Nergal)	2:57
10.	"The Apocalypse" (feat. Daniel Řeřucha)	5:44

== Personnel ==
- Big Boss (Jiří Valter) – vocals, drums (track 2), production
- Marek "Ashok" Šmerda – guitar, production
- Igor Hubík – bass guitar, acoustic guitar, backing vocals
- Paul Dread (Pavel Kubát) – drums
- Daniel Řeřucha – vocals (track 10)
- Erik Danielsson – additional vocals (tracks 2 and 6), cover art
- Nergal (Adam Darski) – additional vocals (tracks 2 and 9)
- Blasphemer (Rune Eriksen) – guitar (track 6)
