= Big Boss (musician) =

Czech musician (born 1952)

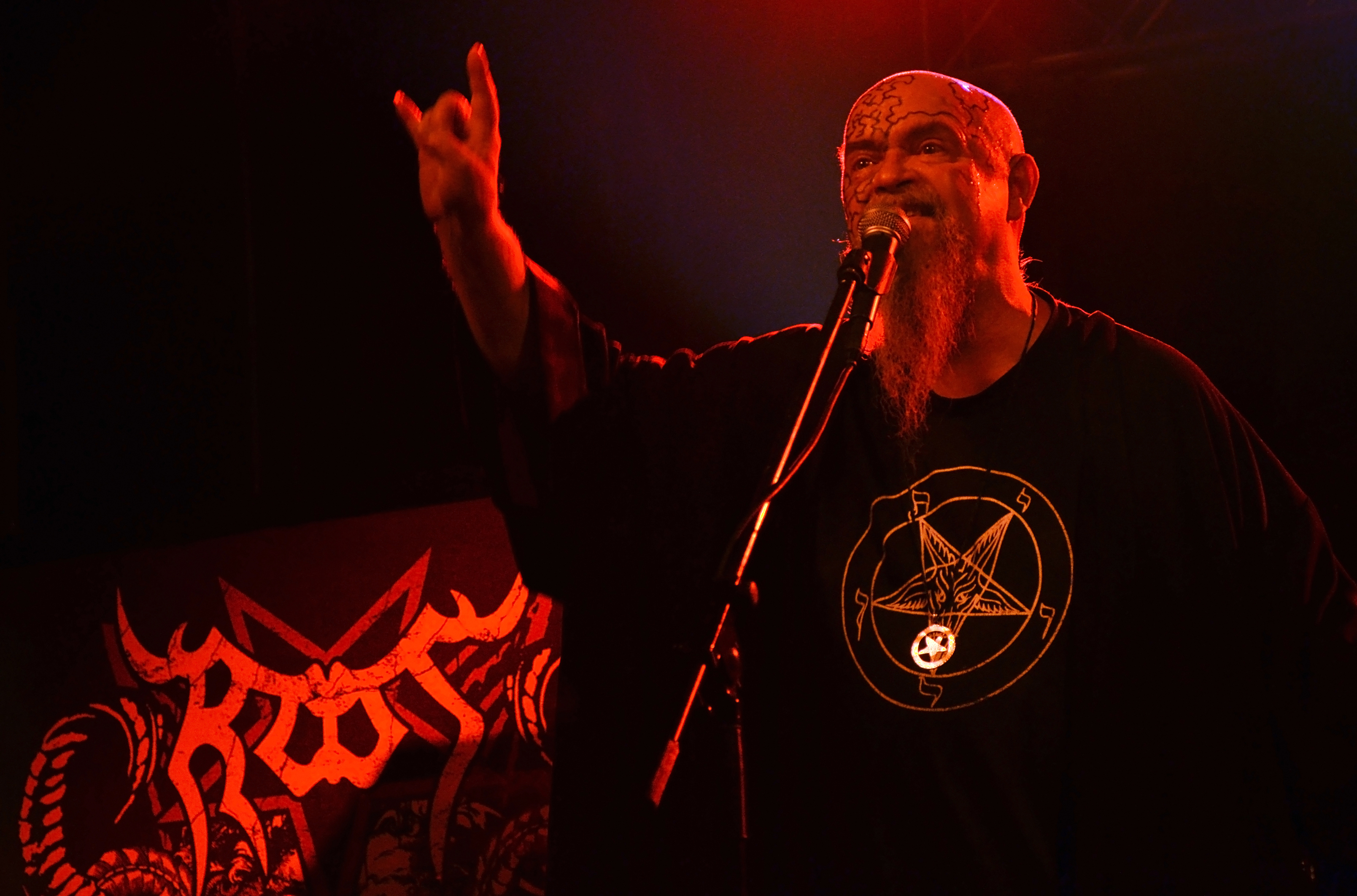
- Big Boss performing with Root in 2014

Background information
- Born: Jiří Valter; 6 February 1952 (age 74); Brno, Czechoslovakia
- Genres: Black metal; heavy metal; progressive metal
- Occupation: Musician
- Instruments: Vocals; drums
- Years active: 1987–present
- Member of: Root; Equirhodont; Big Boss Band
- Website: bigboss.mysteria.cz

Jiří Valter, (born 6 February 1952) better known as Big Boss, is a Czech musician. He started out as the drummer and later became the lead vocalist for the black metal band Root, which he formed in 1987. In 2002, he launched the progressive metal group Equirhodont, and he also performs solo, under the name Jiří "Big Boss" Valter.

== Biography ==
Valter was born in Czechoslovakia in 1952 to the pianist and professor Milan Valter. He started out as a blues singer before moving on to hard rock and eventually metal. According to him, "[a]ll these styles are mixed, either in some of my songs or singing. Mostly in my singing". In late 1987, he founded the black metal band Root together with the guitarist Petr "Blackie" Hošek. They have since released 11 studio albums.

Big Boss launched the side project Equirhodont with Root bandmates Marek Šmerda and Igor Hubík in 2002. In addition to these bands, he has recorded several solo albums, under the name Jiří "Big Boss" Valter.

== Beliefs ==
Valter founded the Czech branch of the Church of Satan in 1991. He claims to have been appointed a high priest by Anton LaVey. He lives his life according to Satanism but delegated the branch's leadership to younger members around 2004 and now believes that "everything that smells of organization is shit".

Rumours have frequently circulated about him being gay. He has denied this and stated: "...if they say that I'm homosexual, it is their problem, not mine. Perhaps it is their wishful thinking. Perhaps when they masturbate, they fantasise about me and I'm an unattainable idol for them... really I don't know".

== Discography ==
=== with Root ===
- Zjevení (1990)
- Hell Symphony (1991)
- The Revelation (1991)
- The Temple in the Underworld (1992)
- Kärgeräs (1996)
- The Book (1999)
- Black Seal (2001)
- Dema (2002)
- Madness of the Graves (2003)
- Casilda (2006)
- Daemon viam invenient (2007)
- Heritage of Satan (2011)
- Kärgeräs – Return from Oblivion (2016)

=== with Equirhodont ===
- Grandiose Magus (2003)
- Black Crystal (2004)

=== Solo ===
- Q7 (1994)
- Belial's Wind (1998)
- Doomy Ballads (2008)
- Collection of Black Roses / Sbírka Černých Růží (2017)
- Než Zemřu (2019)
- Pentagrammaton (box set, 2022)

=== Selected guest performances ===
- "At the Image of Pain" Memorial (Moonspell, 2006)
- "Oaken Dragons" and "The Thrall and the Master" The Journeys and Experiences of Death (Helheim, 2006)
- "Jáma pekel" (Master's Hammer cover) Ezkaton (Behemoth, 2008)
