= Enigma (Aeon Zen album) =

Studio album by Aeon Zen
- Released: January 22, 2013
- Recorded: 2012
- Genre: Progressive metal
- Label: Nightmare Records
- Producer: Rich Hinks

Aeon Zen chronology
The Face of the Unknown (2010)	Enigma (2013)	Ephemera (2014)

Professional ratings
Review scores
Source	Rating
Metal Hammer	8/10 stars
Norway Rock Magazine	5/6 stars
Progression Magazine	15/16 stars

Enigma is the third album by British progressive metal group Aeon Zen. Reviews were generally positive, with AltSounds calling the musicianship "stunning". The album made some departures from the band's previous sounds, with Fireworks magazine noting that "Divinity and Eternal Snow have bursts of growly vocals on the heavier parts", but in spite of this, Prog still deemed there to be an "overwhelming sense of cohesion on this record". Metal Hammer seconded this opinion noting the way that "those theoretically disparate stylistic stands combine to create something that thrums with vitality and a laudable devotion to making music that impresses and resonates".

== Track listing ==
Track	Title	Length
1	Enter the Enigma	2:59
2	Artificial Soul	5:44
3	Divinity	3:55
4	Seven Hills	3:30
5	Warning	6:33
6	Turned to Ash	4:22
7	Still Human	4:53
8	Eternal Snow	6:05
9	Downfall	6:51
10	Survival (CD Bonus Track)	5:15
11	Time Divine 2.0 (CD Bonus Track)	4:44

== Personnel ==
- Rich Hinks – Vocals, Guitar, Bass, Keyboards, Drums, Alto Saxophone, Producer, Mixing, Mastering
- Andi Kravljaca – Vocals
- Matt Shepherd – Guitar
- Shaz – Keyboards
- Steve Burton – Drums
- Nate Loosemore – Guest Vocals
- Atle Pettersen – Guest Vocals
- Jonny Tatum – Guest Vocals
- Mattias Norén – Artwork
