= Kärgeräs =

Studio album by Root
- Released: 1996
- Recorded: 6 November/6 December 1995, Shaark Studio, South Moravia
- Genre: Black metal, heavy metal
- Length: 49:27
- Label: Black Hole Records
- Producer: Big Boss

Root chronology
The Temple in the Underworld (1992)	Kärgeräs (1996)	The Book (1999)

Kärgeräs is the fourth studio album by Czech black metal band Root, released in 1996 through Black Hole Records. Beginning with this album, Root began to drift away from their traditional black metal-inflected sonority, seeing them advancing towards the hybridization of black and heavy metal they are currently famous for.

According to the band's frontman Big Boss, Kärgeräs is a concept album that tells the story of a tribe of warriors that "lived somewhere on this Earth. It was really long ago, long ago before the race of people who unjustly called themselves Homo sapiens settled the Earth. At that time, our story took place". It comes with an 8-page booklet explaining the album's story, plus lyrics and their translation to the Czech language.

The track "Equirhodont/Grandiose Magus" eventually would share its name with the debut album of a side project formed by Big Boss in 2002, Equirhodont. An acoustic music-inflected version of the track "Kärgeräs" previously appeared on his first solo album, Q7, from 1994.

A sequel to Kärgeräs, entitled Kärgeräs – Return from Oblivion, was released on 25 November 2016.

== Track listing ==
All lyrics are written by Big Boss.

No.	Title	Length
1.	"Lykorian" (instrumental)	4:04
2.	"Kärgeräs Prologue"	1:14
3.	"Kärgeräs"	4:23
4.	"Prophet's Song"	4:20
5.	"Rulbräh"	4:18
6.	"Rodäxx"	5:08
7.	"Old Man"	4:13
8.	"Old Woman"	4:29
9.	"Equirhodont/Grandiose Magus"	5:16
10.	"Dygon/Monstrosity"	4:03
11.	"Trygän/Sexton"	6:08
12.	"Dum Vivimus, Vivamus"	1:45

== Personnel ==
- Big Boss (Jiří Valter) – vocals, bass flute, effects, production
- Petr "Blackie" Hošek – guitars, bass, effects, keyboards
- René "Evil" Kostelňák – drums, percussion, guitars (track 8)
