= Mercy Falls =

Studio album by Seventh Wonder
- Released: September 12, 2008
- Recorded: May–June 2008
- Studio: SvS Studios; Studio Nyckelbräda; Studio Wonderland
- Genre: Progressive metal, power metal
- Length: 74:00
- Label: Lion Music
- Producer: Andreas Blomqvist & Seventh Wonder

Seventh Wonder chronology
Waiting in the Wings (2006)	Mercy Falls (2008)	The Great Escape (2010)

Alternative cover

Professional ratings
Review scores
Source	Rating
Sea of Tranquility	4.5/5 stars

Mercy Falls is the third studio album by Swedish progressive metal band Seventh Wonder. It is a concept album that tells the story of a victim of a car crash who, upon awakening from a coma, finds himself in the mysterious town of Mercy Falls, a fictional world he has dreamed up in his comatose state.

The album was released on September 12, 2008. The band announced on their website that the first 1000 copies to be sold would be limited edition copies, with an alternative cover and a bonus DVD containing video footage from the recording sessions as well as interviews with all band members about the new album and private photos from the entire recording process.

== Track listing ==
Mercy Falls track listing
No.	Title	Length
1.	"A New Beginning"	3:05
2.	"There and Back"	3:02
3.	"Welcome to Mercy Falls"	5:11
4.	"Unbreakable"	7:19
5.	"Tears for a Father"	1:58
6.	"A Day Away"	3:43
7.	"Tears for a Son"	1:42
8.	"Paradise"	5:46
9.	"Fall in Line"	6:09
10.	"Break the Silence"	9:29
11.	"Hide and Seek"	7:46
12.	"Destiny Calls"	6:18
13.	"One Last Goodbye"	4:21
14.	"Back in Time"	1:14
15.	"The Black Parade"	6:57
Total length:		74:00

== Personnel ==
All information from the album booklet.

Seventh Wonder

- Tommy Karevik – vocals
- Andreas "Kyrt" Söderin – keyboard
- Johan Liefvendahl – guitars
- Andreas Blomqvist – bass guitar
- Johnny Sandin – drums

Additional musician

- Jenny Karevik – female vocals

Production

- Andreas Blomqvist – producer
- Tommy Hansen – mixing, mastering
- Daniel Flores – engineering, recording
- Johan Larsson – engineering, recording
- Carl-André Beckston – artwork
