= The Book (album) =

Studio album by Root
- Released: 24 June 1999
- Recorded: 18–25 March/10–14 April/20–23 April 1999, Shaark Studio, South Moravia
- Genres: Black metal, heavy metal
- Length: 56:31
- Label: Redblack Productions
- Producer: Petr Hošek

Root chronology
Kärgeräs (1996)	The Book (1999)	Black Seal (2001)

Professional ratings
Review scores
Source	Rating
MetalUnderground.com	4/5 link
MetalReviews.com	89/100 link

The Book is the fifth studio album by Czech black/heavy metal band Root, released on 24 June 1999 through Redblack Productions. It was the band's first album with guitarists Marek "Ashok" Šmerda and Aleš "Alesh A.D." Dostál (even though the latter left the band after the album's release, and only returned in 2014), and their second of four albums to be recorded at the Shaark Studio in South Moravia, the others being Kärgeräs, its sequel Kärgeräs – Return from Oblivion and Black Seal.

The track "Lykorian", included in this album, is different from the eponymous track present in their previous album Kärgeräs.

== Critical reception ==
The Book was very positively received upon its release. MetalUnderground.com gave it a 4 out of 5, stating: "The Book seems more focused overall than The Temple in the Underworld, keeping up the unique style but not going nearly as eclectic. The sound is based in doom and a constant mid-tempo pace, and is overall a bit more mature and advanced than the earlier albums. Unlike with its predecessors, almost none of the album can even be remotely considered black metal anymore, as Root went a far different direction than the infamous second wave. Vocally, the disc usually sticks to a deep and clean baritone singing that can't really be heard anywhere else". MetalReviews.com praised it as "excellent and highly recommended", saying that "the band sound[s] like a cross between Iced Earth and Grand Magus, with plenty of experimentation and a singer that sounds like Roy Orbison" and ultimately rating it with an 89 out of 100.

In 2013, Decibel ranked The Book at number 63 on its list of the Top 100 Black Metal Albums of All Time.

== Track listing ==
All lyrics are written by Big Boss.

No.	Title	Length
1.	"The Book"	5:54
2.	"The Mystical Words of the Wise"	6:09
3.	"The Curse/Durron"	6:24
4.	"Why?"	3:22
5.	"Corabeu (Part I)"	4:09
6.	"Corabeu (Part II)"	5:06
7.	"The Birth"	4:40
8.	"Lykorian"	3:50
9.	"The Message of the Time"	7:48
10.	"Remember Me!"	3:43
11.	"Darkoutro (Toccata – Prestissimo molto)"	5:19

== Personnel ==
- Big Boss (Jiří Valter) – vocals, ocarina
- Petr "Blackie" Hošek – guitar, keyboards, production
- Alesh A.D. (Aleš Dostál) – guitar
- Marek "Ashok" Šmerda – guitar
- René "Evil" Kostelňák – drums
- Milan Valter – piano
- Michal "Siki" Sýkora – cello
- Jaromír "Deather" Bezruč – cover art
- Lenka Slezáková – photography
- Pavel Hlavica – mixing
- Petr Najezchleba – engineering
