= The Temple in the Underworld =

1992 studio album by Root

Studio album by Root
- Released: December 1992
- Recorded: 3/16 October 1992
- Genre: Black metal
- Length: 44:35 (vinyl); 50:43 (CD)
- Label: Monitor
- Producer: Big Boss

Root chronology
Hell Symphony (1991)	The Temple in the Underworld (1992)	Kärgeräs (1996)

Professional ratings
Review scores
Source	Rating
MetalReviews.com	87/100 link

The Temple in the Underworld is the third studio album by Czech black metal band Root, released in December 1992 through Monitor. This marked the end of their early raw black metal sound, and was also their last release with guitarist Daniel "Mr. D.A.N." Janáček. It was re-issued under CD format by Monitor with two bonus tracks.

The lyrics to "Casilda's Song" were taken from the eponymous poem by Robert W. Chambers, originally included on his 1895 book The King in Yellow. However, as per the book, correct spelling should be "Cassilda", not "Casilda". "Intro" uses samples from Ludwig van Beethoven's "Moonlight Sonata".

A music video was made for the track "Aposiopesis".

== Critical reception ==
The Temple in the Underworld has received positive reviews. MetalReviews.com gave it an 87 out of 100, stating: "[Its] riffs are simply amazing, prog-tinged creations of epic melody that will have you gasping with pleasurable shock even as you headbang. Seriously, the hordes of thrashers out there will have their socks blown off by even a few seconds of first track proper 'Casilda's Song', which starts out with epic heavy metal and builds until Big Boss begins to sing and snarl in his usual inimitable way. The riffing speeds up, taking a catchy beatdown that most modern thrash bands would kill to have thought of and the tension builds until the music reaches an almost transcendental point, announcing the band's presence in style".

== Track listing ==
All lyrics are written by Big Boss, except for "Casilda's Song" by Robert W. Chambers.

No.	Title	Length
1.	"Intro" (instrumental)	1:38
2.	"Casilda's Song"	4:49
3.	"The Temple in the Underworld"	5:05
4.	"Aposiopesis"	5:07
5.	"The Solitude" (instrumental)	3:44
6.	"Voices from..." (instrumental)	1:28
7.	"The Wall"	7:56
8.	"The Old Ones"	4:53
9.	"Message"	4:30
10.	"My Name..."	5:25

CD re-issue bonus tracks
No.	Title	Length
11.	"My Deep Mystery"	5:03
12.	"Freebee"	1:05

== Personnel ==
- Big Boss (Jiří Valter) – vocals, production
- Petr "Blackie" Hošek – guitar
- Mr. D.A.N. (Daniel Janáček) – guitar
- René "Evil" Kostelňák – drums
- Pavel Zym – mixing
