= Silent Call =

Swedish progressive metal band

Silent Call was a Swedish progressive and melodic hard rock band.

The band was from Stockholm and made their debut with Creations from a Chosen Path in 2008. Following Greed (2010) and Truth's Redemption (2014), the group announced Windows (2019) as being their last album.

== Discography ==
- Creations from a Chosen Path (2008)
- Greed (2010)
- Truth's Redemption (2014)
- Windows (2019)
