= Ola Halén =

Swedish metal vocalist (born 1977)

- Born: Sven Ola Halén; 12 February 1977 (age 48); Stockholm, Sweden
- Genres: Heavy metal; power metal; hard rock; pop music; acoustic
- Occupations: Singer, songwriter, multi-instrumentalist
- Years active: 2000 – present
- Member of: Insania; Shadows Past; Halén

Sven Ola Halén (born 12 February 1977) is a Swedish metal vocalist and multi-instrumentalist who is the singer and rhythm guitarist of the melodic power metal band Insania (also known as Insania Stockholm). He is also the singer of the progressive power metal band Shadows Past, on hiatus as of 2025.

Halén joined Insania in 2002 after previous vocalist David Henriksson had vacated the band. He remained with the group until 2010, recording the albums Fantasy (A New Dimension) and Agony - Gift of Life, released in 2003 and 2007 respectively.

During his time away from Insania, he released an album with his solo project turned full band Shadows Past called Perfect Chapter in 2013. He rejoined Insania in 2019, recording another album released in 2021 - V - Praeparatus Supervivet, which he also mixed. Following the departure of bandmate and guitarist Peter Östros in 2025, he took up second guitar duties.

He has recorded and released three solo albums, mainly within the heavy and power metal genres. Aside from drums on the 2020 outing Idleness, which were provided by his Shadows Past bandmate Olle Lindroth, Halén has been solely responsible for all vocal and instrumental duties.

He cites his main vocal influences as Michael Kiske (Helloween), Oliver Hartmann (ex-At Vance) and former bandmate Dimitri Keiski.

== Discography ==
Insania

- Fantasy (A New Dimension) (2003)
- Agony – Gift of Life (2007)
- V – Praeparatus Supervivet (2021)

Shadows Past

- Idleness, Pt. I (2000)
- Agony (2001)
- Idleness, Pt. II (2002)
- Idleness, Pt. III (2004)
- Blown Away (demo) (2006)
- Perfect Chapter (demo) (2009)
- Perfect Chapter (2013)

Ola Halén / Halén

- Kind of Weird (2004)
- Nackskott (2016)
- Idleness (2020)
