= 2012 in Nordic music =

The following is a list of notable events and releases that happened in Nordic music in 2012.

== Events ==
- 31 March
  - Norway's Sigrid Moldestad is awarded the Vossajazzprisen for 2012.
  - Norwegian jazz musician and composer Karl Seglem performs the commissioned work Som Spor at Vossajazz.
- 5 May – Norwegian trumpeter Mathias Eick and his quintet receive the BMW Welt Jazz Award 2012.
- 6 May – Swedish singer Loreen wins the 57th annual Eurovision Song Contest, held in Baku, Azerbaijan.
- 6 June – The 20th Sweden Rock Festival opens in Norje, running until 9 June).
- 25 June – Peter Wichers leaves the band Soilwork for a second time.
- 24 September – Swedish band Dark Funeral appear in Washington DC, United States, making their first major appearance with their new vocalist Nachtgarm. He would leave the band after less than a year.
- 1 October – Anette Olzon leaves the band Nightwish.
- 9 November – Finnish band Amberian Dawn announce the departure of singer Heidi Parviainen, drummer Heikki Saari and guitarist Kasperi Heikkinen.
- 21 December – Päivi "Capri" Virkkunen is announced as the new vocalist of Amberian Dawn.

== New works ==
- Hans Abrahamsen – String Quartet No. 4
- Magnus Lindberg – Acequia Madre, for clarinet and piano
- Kaija Saariaho – Circle Map

== Film and television music ==
- Hildur Guðnadóttir – Astro: An Urban Fable in a Magical Rio de Janeiro
- Imaginaerum (released 23 November), based on Finnish symphonic metal band Nightwish's seventh studio album of the same name, co-written by the band's keyboardist and songwriter Tuomas Holopainen.

== Albums released ==
=== January ===
Day	Album	Artist	Label	Notes	Ref.
9	Todd Terje	It's the Arps	Olsen Records	EP	
27	Tord Gustavsen Quartet	The Well	AFM Records		
27	Stian Omenås	Klangkammer 1			

=== February ===
Day	Album	Artist	Label	Notes	Ref.
1	Swallow the Sun	Emerald Forest and the Blackbird	Spinefarm Records		
10	Dunderbeist	Black Arts & Crooked Tails			
10	Engel	Songs for the Dead		EP	
13	Coldworker	The Doomsayer's Call	Listenable Records	Final album before 2013 breakup	
14	Avatar	Black Waltz	eOne Music		
15	Soen	Cognitive	Spinefarm Records	Debut album	

=== March ===
Day	Album	Artist	Label	Notes	Ref.
23	Aura Noir	Out to Die			
26	Borknagar	Urd	High Roller Records / Indie Recordings		
26	Naglfar	Téras	Century Media Records	Features Dirk Verbeuren as a session musician	
30	Atrocity	Die Gottlosen Jahre		Double live DVD	

=== April ===
Day	Album	Artist	Label	Notes	Ref.
18	In Mourning	The Weight of Oceans	Spinefarm Records	Produced by Jonas Kjellgren	
18	Verjnuarmu	Pimmeyvven Ruhtinas	Universal Music		
23	Gothenburg Symphony Orchestra	Sibelius: Symphonies Nos. 5 & 7; Karelia Suite	Decca Records, Deutsche Grammophon	Conducted by Neeme Järvi	

=== May ===
Day	Album	Artist	Label	Notes	Ref.
7	Storm Corrosion	Storm Corrosion	Roadrunner Records	Collaboration between Mikael Åkerfeldt and Steven Wilson	

=== June ===
Day	Album	Artist	Label	Notes	Ref.
1	Circus Maximus	Nine	Frontiers Records		
1	Jorn	Bring Heavy Rock to the Land	Frontiers Records		

=== July ===
Day	Album	Artist	Label	Notes	Ref.
23	Zonaria	Arrival of the Red Sun	Listenable Records		

=== August ===
Day	Album	Artist	Label	Notes	Ref.
24	Tarja Turunen	Act I : Live in Rosario	earMUSIC	Live album recorded at El Círculo Theatre in Rosario, Argentina	
24	Trollfest	Brumlebassen			
27	Ensiferum	Unsung Heroes			
27	Grave	Endless Procession of Souls	Century Media Records		
27	Katatonia	Dead End Kings	Peaceville Records		

=== September ===
Day	Album	Artist	Label	Notes	Ref.
7	Elephant9, with Reine Fiske	Atlantis	Rune Grammofon		

=== October ===
Day	Album	Artist	Label	Notes	Ref.
22	Dark Tranquillity	Zero Distance	Century Media Records	EP	
26	Skálmöld	Börn Loka	Napalm Records	Based on Norse mythology	
30	Ragnarok	Malediction	Agonia Records		

=== November ===
Day	Album	Artist	Label	Notes	Ref.
2	NonExist	From My Cold Dead Hands			
2	Moonlight	Lucifer's Rising	Impaled Records		
2	Tiamat	The Scarred People	Napalm Records		

=== December ===
Day	Artist	Album	Label	Notes	Ref.
3	Basshunter	The Early Bedroom Sessions	Rush Hour	Compilation album	
5	Yngwie Malmsteen	Spellbound	Rising Force		
12	The Project Hate MCMXCIX	The Cadaverous Retaliation Agenda	Mouth of Belial Productions		
21	The Unguided	InvaZion (EP)		EP	

== Deaths ==
- 1 January – Anders Frandsen, Danish singer and television presenter, 51
- 4 January – Totti Bergh, Norwegian jazz saxophonist, 76
- 13 February – Tommi Kristian "Tonmi" Lillman ("Otus"), Finnish drummer (Lordi), 38
- 22 February – Eivin One Pedersen, Norwegian jazz accordionist and pianist, 55
- 15 March – Edvard Hagerup Bull, Norwegian classical composer, 89
- 15 June – Rune Gustafsson, Swedish guitarist and composer, 78
- 8 October – John Tchicai, Danish saxophonist and composer, 76
- 15 October – Axel Borup-Jørgensen, Danish composer, 87
- 3 November
  - Anne-Lise Berntsen, Norwegian soprano, 69
  - Odd Børretzen, Norwegian author and folk singer, 85
- 15 November – Frode Thingnæs, Norwegian jazz musician, 72
