= 2010 in Nordic music =

The following is a list of notable events and releases that happened in Nordic music in 2010.

== Events ==
- 1 January – Swedish band Cult of Luna release Eviga Riket, a publication giving the full story behind their Eternal Kingdom album.
- 29 January – Norwegian jazz bassist Bodvar Moe is awarded the Nordlysprisen.
- 29 May – In the final of the Eurovision Song Contest in Oslo, Norway, Denmark is the most successful of the Scandinavian countries, finishing in fourth place.
- 10 June – The 27th Stockholm Jazz Festival opens in Stockholm, Sweden, running until 12 June.
- 26 July – Emperor Magus Caligula leaves the Swedish band Dark Funeral, followed shortly afterwards by bandmates "B-Force" and "Dominator", leaving Lord Ahriman and "Chaq Mol" as the band's only members.
- 2 November – The Oslo World Music Festival opens, running until 7 November.

== New works ==
- Magnus Lindberg – Souvenir
- Kaija Saariaho – Mirages

== Film scores and incidental music ==
- Jon Ekstrand - Easy Money

== Albums released ==
=== January ===
Day	Album	Artist	Label	Notes	Ref.
11	Tore Johansen feat. Steve Swallow	I.S.	Inner Ear		
18	Motorpsycho	Heavy Metal Fruit	Stickman Records, Rune Grammofon		
18	Valkyrja	Contamination	Metal Blade Records		
25	Deathbound	Non Compos Mentis	Dynamic Arts Records		
25	Dream Evil	In the Night	Century Media Records		
25	Ihsahn	After	Candlelight Records		
25	In Mourning	Monolith	Agonia Records/Pulverised Records		

=== February ===
Day	Album	Artist	Label	Notes	Ref.
2	Nostradameus	Illusion's Parade	AFM Records	Featuring members of Fejd and Pathos	
17	Finntroll	Nifelvind	Century Media		
19	Throes of Dawn	The Great Fleet of Echoes		Released at the Finnish Metal Expo	

=== March ===
Day	Album	Artist	Label	Notes	Ref.
1	Mads Eriksen	Just What the World Needs	MTG Music		
1	Mortemia	Misere Mortem	Napalm Records		
8	Burzum	Belus	Byelobog Productions	First album for 11 years	
10	Salem Al Fakir	Ignore This	EMI		

=== April ===
Day	Album	Artist	Label	Notes	Ref.
14	Anna Bergendahl	Yours Sincerely	Lionheart		
16	Terje Rypdal	Crime Scene	ECM Records	Commissioned for the 2009 Bergen Festival	
19	Live Extracts	Eivind Aarset's Sonic Codex Orchestra	ECM Records	Produced by Manfred Eicher	
23	Ketil Bjørnstad	Remembrance	ECM Records	featuring Tore Brunborg and Jon Christensen	

=== May ===
Day	Album	Artist	Label	Notes	Ref.
10	Keep of Kalessin	Reptilian	Nuclear Blast	Last album to feature Torbjørn "Thebon" Schei on vocals	
19	Eric Saade	Masquerade	Roxy Recordings	First solo album	
19	April Divine	Redemption	Supernova/Cosmos		

=== June ===
Day	Album	Artist	Label	Notes	Ref.
9	Oskar Linnros	Vilja Bli	Universal Records		
14	Grave	Burial Ground	Regain Records	Last album to feature Fredrik Isaksson	
14	Setherial	Ekpyrosis	Regain Records		

=== July ===
Day	Album	Artist	Label	Notes	Ref.
2	Soilwork	The Panic Broadcast	Nuclear Blast	Produced by Peter Wichers	
19	Darkane	Layers of Live	Listenable Records	Live album	
21	Kvelertak	Kvelertak	Indie Recordings	Debut album	

=== August ===
Day	Album	Artist	Label	Notes	Ref.
6	Immortal	The Seventh Date of Blashyrkh	Nuclear Blast	Live DVD album recorded 2007	
18	Satanic Warmaster	Nachzehrer	Werewolf Records		
23	Apocalyptica	7th Symphony	Sony Music Germany		

=== September ===
Day	Album	Artist	Label	Notes	Ref.
1	Tarja Turunen	What Lies Beneath	Vertigo Records		
20	Jan Garbarek and The Hilliard Ensemble	Officium Novum	ECM Records	Produced by Manfred Eicher	

=== October ===
Day	Album	Artist	Label	Notes	Ref.
6	Corroded	Exit To Transfer	Ninetone Records		
19	Dag Arnesen Trio	Norwegian Song 3	Losen Records		
20	Amberian Dawn	End of Eden	Spinefarm Records	First album with Spinefarm	
20	Arckanum	Sviga Læ	Regain Records		

=== November ===
Day	Album	Artist	Label	Notes	Ref.
1	Frida Ånnevik	Synlige Hjerteslag	Grappa Music		
24	Dark the Suns	Sleepwalking in a Nightmare	Firebox Records		
24	Teräsbetoni	Maailma Tarvitsee Sankareita	Sakara Records	Produced by Hiili Hiilesmaa	
26	Hardcore Superstar	Split Your Lip	Nuclear Blast		

=== December ===
Day	Album	Artist	Label	Notes	Ref.
11	Seventh Wonder	The Great Escape	Lion Music	Including 30-minute title track	
16	Haakon Graf with Per Mathisen and Erik Smith	License To Chill	Nordic Records		

== Deaths ==
- 26 January – Dag Frøland, 64, Norwegian entertainer
- 12 February – Grethe Sønck, 80, Danish actress and singer
- 4 March – Amalie Christie, 96, Norwegian classical pianist
- 21 April – Gustav Lorentzen, 62, Norwegian folk singer and entertainer (Knutsen & Ludvigsen)
- 24 April – Bo Hansson, 67, Swedish rock keyboardist
- 30 May – Kristian Bergheim, 83, Norwegian jazz saxophonist
- 5 June – Arne Nordheim, 78, Norwegian contemporary classical experimental composer
- 15 July – Knut Stensholm, 56, Norwegian drummer
- 23 July – Willy Bakken ("willy b"), 59, Norwegian guitarist and popular culture writer
- 16 September – Erkki Ertama, 82, Finnish composer and conductor
- 13 October – Ulrik Cold, 71, Danish operatic bass
- 7 December – Kari Tapio, 65, Finnish schlager singer
- 30 December – Thomas Funck, 91, Swedish baron and polymath
