= You'll Never See... =

You'll Never See…

Studio album by Grave
- Released: 1 September 1992
- Recorded: Sunlight Studios, June 1992
- Genre: Death metal
- Length: 36:59
- Label: Century Media
- Producer: Tomas Skogsberg, Grave

Grave chronology
Into the Grave (1991)	You'll Never See… (1992)	…And Here I Die… Satisfied (1993)

Professional ratings
Review scores
Source	Rating
AllMusic	3/5 stars

You'll Never See… is the second studio album by Swedish death metal band Grave. It was released in 1992 on Century Media.

== Music ==
The music on You'll Never See... is considered to be less complex than on previous releases. Joe DiVita of Loudwire wrote: "On their second album, Sweden’s Grave dumbed down their writing a bit, but a diminishing IQ is sacred within death metal’s halls. [...] The riffing isn’t overly complicated, centering around meaty grooves that trade off [...] with the vocals."

== Critical reception and legacy ==
Eduardo Rivadavia of AllMusic gave the album three stars out of five. He wrote: "even a cursory listen to You'll Never See... is enough to realize that Grave had progressed not one bit from their devastating debut, which still might have been fine and dandy, had the competition not been noticeably outpacing them in every regard. Yes, that unmistakably chunky SDM sound, as produced by the ubiquitous Sunlight Studios, still sounded markedly fresh and served as something of an attraction on its own, but notwithstanding the album's monstrous, opening title track and a few other undeniably strong cuts, the remaining material simply bled together with disappointing indifference."

== Track listing ==
No.	Title	Length
1.	"You'll Never See"	5:10
2.	"Now and Forever"	4:18
3.	"Morbid Way to Die"	4:47
4.	"Obsessed"	3:51
5.	"Grief"	4:53
6.	"Severing Flesh"	5:15
7.	"Brutally Deceased"	3:59
8.	"Christi(ns)anity"	4:44
Total length:		36:59

== Personnel ==
Grave

- Ola Lindgren – guitars, backing vocals
- Jörgen Sandström – vocals, guitars, bass
- Jens Paulsson – drums

Production

- Tomas Skogsberg – recording, mixing, producer
- Claus C. Pilz – layout
- Axel Hermann – cover art
