= Into the Grave =

Studio album by Grave
- Released: 1 August 1991
- Genre: Death metal
- Length: 41:24
- Label: Century Media
- Producer: Tomas Skogsberg

Grave chronology
Into the Grave (1991)	You'll Never See... (1992)

Professional ratings
Review scores
Source	Rating
AllMusic	4.5/5 stars

Into the Grave is the debut album by Swedish death metal band Grave. It was released in 1991 on Century Media. It was re-released 17 September 2001 with additional tracks from the Tremendous Pain EP and some demo tracks.

== Track listing ==
No.	Title	Length
1.	"Deformed"	4:07
2.	"In Love"	3:36
3.	"For Your God"	3:46
4.	"Obscure Infinity"	3:08
5.	"Hating Life"	3:02
6.	"Into the Grave"	4:09
7.	"Extremely Rotten Flesh"	4:36
8.	"Haunted"	3:39
9.	"Day of Mourning"	3:35
10.	"Inhuman"	3:52
11.	"Banished to Live"	4:50
Total length:		41:24

Additional tracks on reissue

1. "Tremendous Pain" – 3:29
2. "Putrefaction Remains" – 2:53
3. "Haunted" – 3:29
4. "Day of Mourning" – 3:34
5. "Eroded" – 3:16
6. "Inhuman" – 3:39
7. "Obscure Infinity" – 3:12

== Personnel ==
Grave

- Ola Lindgren – guitars, vocals
- Jörgen Sandström – lead vocals, guitars
- Jens "Jensa" Paulsson – drums
- Jonas Torndal – bass

Production

- Tomas Skogsberg – producer, mixing
- Axel Hermann – cover art
