= Bhavnath fair =

Religious fair in Gujarat, India

Bhavnath fair Bhavnath Fair
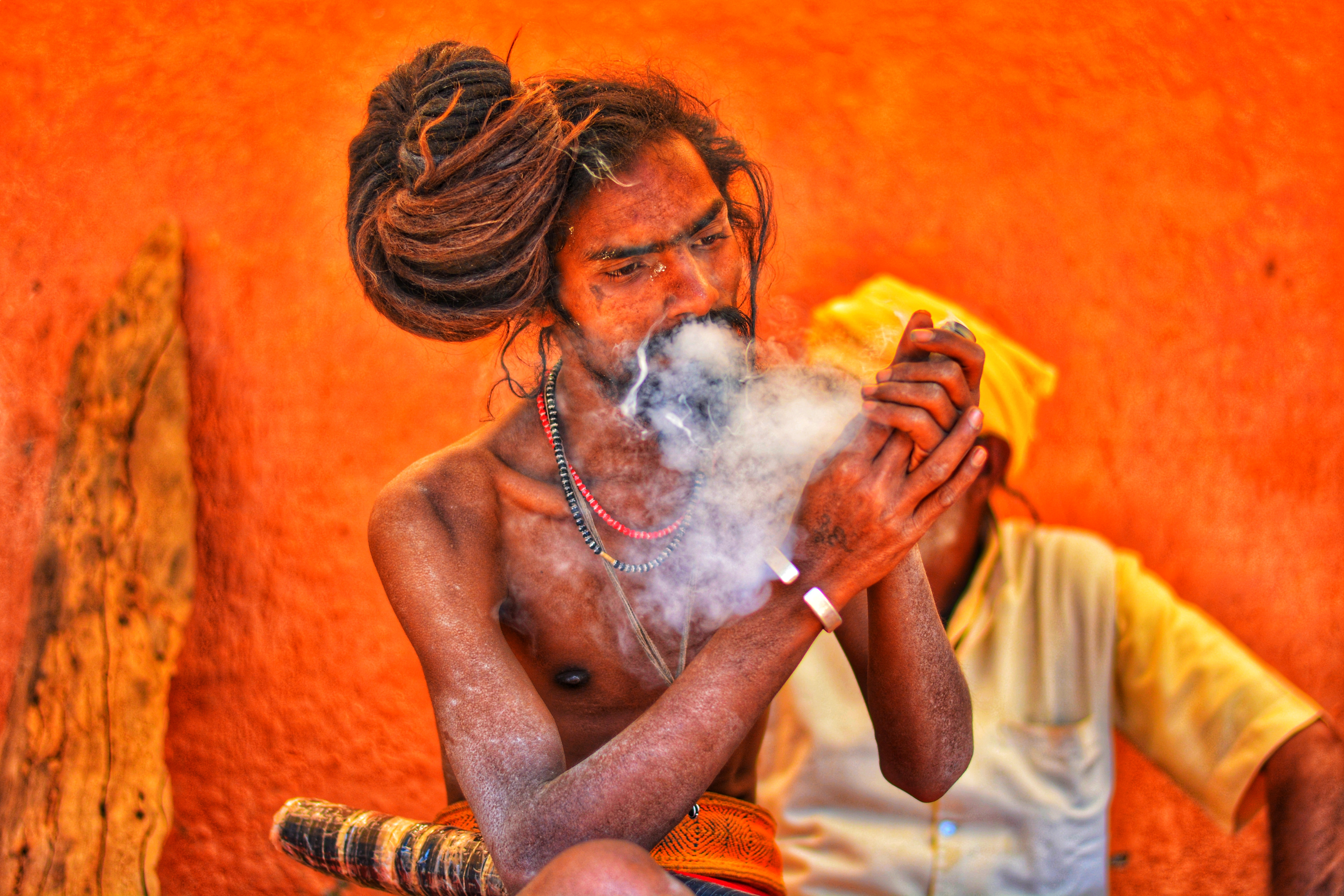
- Naga sadhu at the fair of Bhavnath
- Genre: Cultural and religious festival
- Begins: Maagha Vad Navmi
- Ends: Maagha Vad Teras
- Frequency: Annual
- Locations: Junagadh, Junagadh district, Gujarat
- Country: India

Bhavnath fair is held at the Foothills of Girnar mountain in Junagadh, Gujarat on the banks of the river Suvarnarekha. Bhavnath Fair is one of the important fairs of Gujarat.

== Place ==
At the foothills of Girnar in Junagadh, on the banks of the river Suvarnarekha, lies a very ancient temple of Lord Bhavnath. The background of the spontaneous Shivling of the temple looks beautiful with the wonderful (nature) forest.

== Time ==
This fair is held every year on the occasion of Maha Shivaratri from Maagha Vad (Krishna Paksha) Navmi to Maagha Vad Teras.

== Religious significance ==
In the fair of Bhavanath, Lord Bhavanath is worshiped at the midnight of Maha Shivaratri. A large number of monks and Naga Sadhus come from all over Gujarat to pay homage to Mahapuja. Almonries are also opened at various places for the visitors.

On the day of Maagha Vad Navami, the flag of religion and culture is hoisted over the temple of Lord Bhavanath. At this time, Nagabawa is seen riding on elephants, chanting conch and playing various instruments, chanting Mahadev. The caves of Muchkund, Bhartuhari and Guru Dutt are also very famous in this place. Millions of devotees come here to visit and enjoy the fair.

This place is a place of faith and belief for the people of Ahir and Mer. Folk music, ras-garba and bhajan-kirtan programs are also organized at night during the days of the fair.

== History ==
There is a legend in the Skanda Purana regarding the fair of Bhavnath. According to this legend, when Shiva-Parvati was traveling in a chariot through the sky, her divine ornament falls down near the temple of Bhavnath. Hence it is known as Vastra Putakshetra.

The procession of the Nagabavas, accompanied by the sound of conch during the Maha Puja on the day of Maha Shivaratri, bathing in the Mrigi Kund and chanting at the foothills of Girnar is a spiritual experience. According to a folktale, bathing in a Mrigi Kund brings salvation to the people.

Siddhas like Bhartuhari, Gopichand and Ashwatthama live in Girnar, the place of Navnath and Mahasiddha. And on the day of Shivratri, these Siddha men come to bathe in Mrigi Kund. There is also a belief that Siddha men do not appear outside once they have bathed in this Kund.

== Facilities ==
Accommodation and meals are provided free of cost to the visitors of Bhavnath Fair. Tents that can accommodate 300 to 350 people are built for people. Shops of various offerings and items are also set up for people to buy. Government and semi-government organizations also hold their own exhibitions.
