= Burial Ground =

Burial Ground may refer to:

- a cemetery
- Burial Ground (film), a 1981 Italian zombie movie
- Burial Ground (album), by Grave, 2010
- Burial Ground, a 2012 album by Stick Figure
- "Burial Ground", a 2024 song by The Decemberists, from the album As It Ever Was, So It Will Be Again
