= Sheol (album) =

Studio album by Naglfar
- Released: 24 March 2003
- Recorded: July – August 2002 at Ballerina Audio AB, Sweden
- Genre: Black metal; death metal
- Length: 43:37
- Label: Century Media

Naglfar chronology
Ex Inferis (2002)	Sheol (2003)	Pariah (2005)

Sheol is the third studio album by Swedish black metal band Naglfar. It was released on 24 March 2003 through Century Media Records and New Hawen Records. It was their first full-length album in five years, after Diabolical (1998).

== Reception ==
Professional ratings
Review scores
Source	Rating
Exclaim!	favourable
Rock Hard	10/10

Laura Taylor of Exclaim! said that Sheol is "as melodic as it is brutal", and called it "an unrelenting attack on the senses". She noted that the album "starts to lose effectiveness towards the...end". Rock Hard gave it a 10/10 score, and in 2005, Sheol was ranked number 407 in Rock Hard magazine's book The 500 Greatest Rock & Metal Albums of All Time. Metal.de gave it an 8/10 score, and Blabbermouth.net a 7.5/10.

== Track listing ==
All tracks are written by Naglfar

No.	Title	Length
1.	"I Am Vengeance"	5:16
2.	"Black God Aftermath"	6:28
3.	"Wrath of the Fallen"	4:52
4.	"Abysmal Descent"	6:56
5.	"Devoured by Naglfar"	4:32
6.	"Of Gorgons Spawned Through Witchcraft"	4:45
7.	"Unleash Hell"	3:31
8.	"Force of Pandemonium"	5:25
9.	"The Infernal Ceremony" (instrumental)	1:52

== Personnel ==
=== Naglfar ===
- Jens Rydén – vocals, keyboards, layout, logo, additional artwork
- Kristoffer Olivius – bass, vocals
- Andreas Nilsson – guitars
- Marcus E. Norman – guitars, keyboards
- Mattias Grahn – drums

=== Additional personnel ===
- Nils Johansson – engineering, additional keyboards
- Ingrid Sjöberg – photography
