= Havoc (album) =

Studio album by Circus Maximus
- Released: March 18, 2016
- Genre: Progressive metal
- Length: 54:05
- Label: Frontiers
- Producer: Mats Haugen

Circus Maximus chronology
Nine (2012)	Havoc (2016)

Havoc is the fourth studio album by Norwegian progressive metal band Circus Maximus, released on 18 March 2016. The deluxe edition includes a bonus track and an additional disc featuring a 2012 live performance in Japan.

== Track listing ==
All tracks are written by Circus Maximus.

No.	Title	Length
1.	"The Weight"	6:18
2.	"Highest Bitter"	5:13
3.	"Havoc"	3:22
4.	"Pages"	5:02
5.	"Flames"	4:04
6.	"Loved Ones"	8:09
7.	"After the Fire"	8:30
8.	"Remember"	5:39
9.	"Chivalry"	7:48
Total length:		54:05

Deluxe Edition Bonus Track
No.	Title	Length
10.	"Loath"	4:37
Total length:		58:42

Bonus Live CD (Deluxe Edition)
No.	Title	Length
1.	"Forging"	0:45
2.	"Namaste"	4:09
3.	"The One"	4:03
4.	"Arrival of Love"	4:38
5.	"Abyss"	5:43
6.	"Alive"	5:48
7.	"Game of Life"	5:39
8.	"Last Goodbye"	9:46
Total length:		40:31

== Personnel ==
Circus Maximus

- Michael Eriksen − Lead vocals
- Mats Haugen − Guitar, backing vocals, programming, producer
- Truls Haugen − Drums, percussion, backing vocals
- Lasse Finbråten − Keyboards, samples, programming
- Glen Cato Møllen − Bass

Additional personnel

- Christer Andre Cederberg – Mixing

== Charts ==
Chart (2016)	Peak position
Belgian Albums (Ultratop Flanders)	164
Belgian Albums (Ultratop Wallonia)	132
Norwegian Albums (VG-lista)	19
Swiss Albums (Schweizer Hitparade)	40
