= Hating Life =

Studio album by Grave
- Released: 7 May 1996
- Recorded: December 1995 – January 1996
- Studio: Sunlight Studio, Stockholm
- Genre: Death metal, groove metal
- Length: 32:52
- Label: Century Media
- Producer: Tomas Skogsberg

Grave chronology
| Soulless (1994) | Hating Life (1996) | Extremely Rotten Live (1997) |

Professional ratings
Review scores
| Source | Rating |
|---|---|
| AllMusic | 1/5 stars |
| SLUG | Favourable |

Hating Life is the fourth album by Swedish death metal band Grave. It was released on 7 May 1996 through Century Media Records. The band continues to experiment with their sound by incorporating a groove metal style on this album.

== Track listing ==
| No. | Title | Length |
|---|---|---|
| 1. | "Worth the Wait" | 3:42 |
| 2. | "Restrained" | 3:44 |
| 3. | "Winternight" | 3:03 |
| 4. | "Two of Me" | 2:39 |
| 5. | "Beauty Within" | 3:47 |
| 6. | "Lovesong" | 3:12 |
| 7. | "Sorrowfilled Moon" | 4:23 |
| 8. | "Harvest Day" | 3:44 |
| 9. | "Redress" | 3:30 |
| 10. | "Still Hating Life" | 1:15 |

== Personnel ==
=== Grave ===
- Ola Lindgren – vocals, guitar, bass
- Jens "Jensa" Paulsson – drums

=== Technical personnel ===
- Tomas Skogsberg – production
- Peter in de Betou – mastering
- Rolf Brenner – photography
- Karin Nilsson – winter photo
