= Garden of Storms =

Studio album by In Mourning
- Released: 4 October 2019
- Genre: Progressive metal, melodic death metal, doom metal
- Length: 50:26
- Label: Agonia Records

In Mourning chronology
Afterglow (2016)	Garden of Storms (2019)	The Bleeding Veil (2021)

Professional ratings
Review scores
Source	Rating
Metal Storm	8.2/10
Metal Temple	9/10
Time for Metal	8.8/10

Garden of Storms is the fifth studio album by Swedish melodic death metal band In Mourning, released on 4 October 2019 via Agonia Records.

== Track listing ==
Music written by Tobias Netzell and In Mourning. Lyrics by Tim Nedergård and Björn Pettersson.

No.	Title	Length
1.	"Black Storm"	7:23
2.	"Yields of Sand"	6:23
3.	"Hierophant"	6:17
4.	"Magenta Ritual"	6:43
5.	"Huntress Moon"	6:55
6.	"Tribunal of Suns"	7:25
7.	"The Lost Outpost"	9:20

== Credits ==
=== Musicians ===
- Tobias Netzell – vocals, guitars
- Björn Pettersson – guitars, vocals
- Tim Nedergård – guitars
- Sebastian Svalland – bass
- Joakim Strandberg Nilsson – drums
