= Fiendish Regression =

Studio album by Grave
- Released: 23 August 2004
- Recorded: April–May 2004 at Studio Abyss
- Genre: Death metal
- Length: 50:30
- Label: Century Media
- Producers: Peter Tägtgren, Tommy Tägtgren

Grave chronology
Back from the Grave (2002)	Fiendish Regression (2004)	As Rapture Comes (2006)

Professional ratings
Review scores
Source	Rating
AllMusic	3/5 stars
Scream Magazine	5/6 stars

Fiendish Regression is the sixth album by Swedish death metal band Grave. It was released on 23 August 2004 through Century Media Records.

== Track listing ==
No.	Title	Length
1.	"Last Journey"	5:03
2.	"Reborn"	3:45
3.	"Awakening"	4:28
4.	"Breeder"	4:09
5.	"Trial by Fire"	3:47
6.	"Out of the Light"	4:05
7.	"Inner Voice"	4:07
8.	"Bloodfeast"	4:15
9.	"Heretic"	5:02
Total length:		50:30

Limited first edition bonus tracks and black slipcase
No.	Title	Length
10.	"Burial at Sea" (Saint Vitus cover)	7:40
11.	"Autopsied" (Re-recorded)	4:03

== Personnel ==
Grave

- Pelle Ekegren – drums
- Jonas Torndal – guitars
- Ola Lindgren – vocals, guitars
- Fredrik Isaksson – bass

Production

- Olle Carlsson – photography (band)
- Jacek Wiśniewski – cover art
- Tommy Tägtgren – recording, mixing, producer
- Peter Tägtgren – producer
- Henrik Jonsson – mastering
- Ola Lindgren – recording, mixing, lyrics
- Stefan Wibbeke – layout, design
