= ...And Here I Die... Satisfied =

... And Here I Die... Satisfied

EP by Grave
- Released: 8 February 1993
- Recorded: October 1990 – 29 July 1992
- Genre: Death metal
- Length: 22:45
- Label: Century Media Records

Grave chronology
You'll Never See... (1992)	... And Here I Die... Satisfied (1993)	Soulless (1994)

Professional ratings
Review scores
Source	Rating
AllMusic	2.5/5 stars

...And Here I Die... Satisfied is an EP by Swedish death metal band Grave, released in February 1993 on Century Media Records.

"Black Dawn" is a re-recording of the title track from their 1987 demo when they were known as Corpse.

== Track listing ==
No.	Title	Length
1.	"And Here I Die"	4:09
2.	"I Need You"	4:31
3.	"Black Dawn"	3:27
4.	"Tremendous Pain"	3:27
5.	"Day of Mourning"	3:32
6.	"Inhuman"	3:39
Total length:		22:45

== Personnel ==
Grave

- Jörgen Sandström – vocals, guitars, bass
- Ola Lindgren – guitars, backing vocals
- Jens "Jensa" Paulsson – drums
- Jonas Torndal – bass (tracks 4–6)

Production

- Axel Hermann – cover art
