= Afterglow (In Mourning album) =

Studio album by In Mourning
- Released: 20 May 2016
- Genre: Progressive metal, melodic death metal, progressive death metal
- Length: 53:46
- Label: Agonia Records

In Mourning chronology
The Weight of Oceans (2012)	Afterglow (2016)	Garden of Storms (2019)

Professional ratings
Review scores
Source	Rating
Metal Storm	8.3/10
Metal Temple	6/10

Afterglow is the fourth studio album by Swedish melodic death metal band In Mourning, released on 20 May 2016 via Agonia Records. It is their last album with founding bassist Pierre Stam, and their only album with drummer Daniel Liljekvist, formerly of Katatonia.

== Track listing ==
No.	Title	Length
1.	"Fire and Ocean"	6:19
2.	"The Grinning Mist"	9:50
3.	"Ashen Crown"	8:05
4.	"Below Rise to the Above"	7:46
5.	"The Lighthouse Keeper"	7:29
6.	"The Call to Orion"	8:24
7.	"Afterglow"	5:53

== Credits ==
=== Musicians ===
- Tobias Netzell – vocals, guitars
- Björn Pettersson – guitars, vocals
- Tim Nedergård – guitars
- Pierre Stam – bass
- Daniel Liljekvist – drums
