= The Project Hate MCMXCIX =

Swedish death metal band

- Origin: Sweden
- Genres: Death metal, industrial metal
- Years active: 1998–present
- Members: Lord K. Philipson; Jörgen Sandström; Ellinor Asp; Dirk Verbeuren; Lasse Johansson
- Past members: Mia Ståhl; Jonna Enckell; Michael Håkansson; Daniel Moilanen; Thomas Olsson; Ruby Roque; Tobben Gustafsson; Anders Bertilsson
- Website: theprojecthate.net

The Project Hate MCMXCIX (often referred to as The Project Hate or TPH) is a Swedish death metal band influenced by electro-industrial music.

== History ==
Lord K Philipson (formerly of Leukemia, House of Usher, Lame, Toolshed, Torture Division, as well as doing session work as live bassist/guitarist for Candlemass, Vomitory, Dark Funeral and Grave) and Jörgen Sandström (previously of Vicious Art, Krux, Entombed, Grave, Torture Division, and live bassist/guitarist for Candlemass, Misery Loves Co., Kongh) formed The Project Hate MCMXCIX in 1999.

TPH recorded a three-song demo in 1998, produced by Dan Swanö and featuring backing vocals by Entombed A.D. vocalist Lars-Göran Petrov. The band sent the demo to four labels, and in 1999, they signed with Germany-based Massacre Records, making 1999 the group's official starting year.

In 1998, the band recorded a Philipson-conceived project, Deadmarch: Initiation of Blasphemy, but the album initially went unreleased. It was mastered by Swanö and released on Vic Records 30 November 2009, with new album artwork and booklet.

By the end of 1999, The Project Hate recorded their debut album, Cybersonic Superchrist, released in 2000. During the recording, female singer Mia Ståhl joined the band. Although reviews were positive, the album was not a commercial success since it was not distributed widely.

The following year, the band recorded their second album, When We Are Done, Your Flesh Will Be Ours, in late Nasum frontman Mieszko Talarczyk's Soundlab Studios. It was released in 2001, but like the first album, was only with difficulty available in stores.

In 2002, Petter S. Freed of 2 Ton Predator joined as a touring guitarist and later as a permanent member. Mia Ståhl was fired and Jonna Enckell replaced her. Later that year, the band left Massacre Records and signed with Threeman Recordings. The live album Killing Hellsinki was recorded in Helsinki, Finland, and released in April 2003. Afterwards, the band went back to Soundlab Studios and Mieszko Talarczyk to record Hate, Dominate, Congregate, Eliminate.

In early 2005, the band began recording their fourth studio album, Armageddon March Eternal - Symphonies of Slit Wrists, with Swanö. Bassist Michael Håkansson of Evergrey joined the band during recording, and later full-time. Armageddon March Eternal was released by Threeman Recordings in October 2005.

In 2006, the band left their record label and signed with Peter Stormare's record label, StormVox. The band added drummer Daniel Moilanen for their upcoming album, to have live drums for the first time. The fifth studio album, In Hora Mortis Nostræ, was released September 2007. Distribution deals were sought throughout late 2007 to maximize album reach, with little success.

In July 2009, the band released its sixth full-length studio album, The Lustrate Process, on Vic Records.

Singer Jo Enckell was replaced with ex-Witchbreed's Ruby Roque in 2010. Bassist Michael Håkansson was announced as being no longer in the band following his absence from The Lustrate Process. Lord K Philipson has played bass since. Thomas Ohlsson was replaced with ex-Vomitory/Torture Division drummer Tobias 'Tobben' Gustafsson.

Drummer Dirk Verbeuren replaced Ruby Roque in 2014. The new female singer was Ellinor Asp.

Apart from Philipson, there are no longer any fixed band members; only Jörgen Sandström has been there since the beginning), but a wide array of musicians are brought in for each recording.

== Members ==
=== Current musicians ===
- Lord K Philipson – guitar, bass, keyboards, programming, backing vocals (1998–present)
- Jörgen Sandström – vocals (1998–present)
- Ellinor Asp – female vocals (2014–present)
- Dirk Verbeuren – drums (2014–present)
- Lasse Johansson – guitar solos (2014–present)

=== Former musicians ===
- Mia Ståhl – female vocals (1999–2002)
- Jo Enckell – female vocals (2002–2010)
- Ruby Roque – female vocals (2010–2013)
- Petter S. Freed – guitar (2002–2008)
- Anders Bertilsson – guitar (2009–2011)
- Michael Håkansson – bass (2005–2010)
- Daniel "Mojjo" Moilanen – drums (2006–2007)
- Thomas Ohlsson – drums (2009–2010)
- Tobben Gustafsson – drums (2010–2013)

=== Guest musicians ===
- Morgan Lundin – backing vocals
- L.G Petrov – backing vocals
- Emperor Magus Caligula – backing vocals
- Rickard Alriksson – backing vocals
- Gustaf Jorde – backing vocals
- Jonas Granvik – backing vocals
- Morten Hansen – backing vocals
- Linus Ekström – backing vocals
- Peter Andersson – backing vocals
- Anders Eriksson – backing vocals
- Lars Levin – backing vocals
- Tobbe Sillman – backing vocals
- Jocke Widfeldt – backing vocals
- Matti Mäkelä – backing vocals
- Peter Stjärnvind – backing vocals
- Jonas Torndal – backing vocals
- Anders Schultz – backing vocals
- Björn Åkesson – backing vocals
- Matte Borg – backing vocals
- Robban Eriksson – backing vocals
- Tommy Dahlström – backing vocals
- Tyra Sandström – backing vocals
- Robert Lundin – backing vocals
- Martin van Drunen – backing vocals
- Christian Älvestam – backing vocals
- Johan Hegg – backing vocals
- Leif Edling – backing vocals
- Jo Bench – backing vocals
- Peter Dolving – backing vocals
- Erik Rundqvist – backing vocals
- Lawrence Mackrory – backing vocals
- Richard Sjunnesson – backing vocals
- Ross Dolan – backing vocals
- Johan Längquist – backing vocals
- Boudewijn Bonebakker – guitar solos
- Sebastian Reichl – guitar and keyboard solos
- Mike Wead – guitar solos
- Pär Fransson – guitar solos
- Henry Pyykkö – guitar solos
- Magnus Söderman – guitar solos
- Danny Tunker – guitar solos
- Henrik Danhage – guitar solos
- Fredrik Folkare – guitar solos

== Discography ==
=== Studio releases ===
- Cybersonic Superchrist (2000, Massacre Records)
- When We Are Done, Your Flesh Will Be Ours (2001, Massacre Records)
- Hate, Dominate, Congregate, Eliminate (2003, Threeman Recordings)
- Armageddon March Eternal – Symphonies of Slit Wrists (2005, Threeman Recordings)
- In Hora Mortis Nostræ (2007, StormVox Records)
- Deadmarch: Initiation of Blasphemy (recorded in 1998, released in 2009 by Vic Records)
- The Lustrate Process (2009, Vic Records)
- Bleeding the New Apocalypse (Cum Victriciis In Manibus Armis) (2011, Season of Mist)
- The Cadaverous Retaliation Agenda (self-released on Mouth of Belial in 2013)
- There Is No Earth I Will Leave Unscorched (self-released on Mouth of Belial in 2014)
- Of Chaos and Carnal Pleasures (self-released on Mouth of Belial in 2017)
- Death Ritual Covenant (self-released on Mouth of Belial in 2018)
- Purgatory (self-released on Mouth of Belial in 2020)
- Spewing Venom into the Eyes of Deities (self-released on Mouth of Belial in 2021)
- Abominations of the Ageless (self-released on Mouth of Belial in 2023)
- Undivine Dethroning (self-released on Mouth of Belial in 2025)

=== Live recordings ===
- Killing Hellsinki (live album, 2003)

=== Web releases ===
- "The Innocence of the Three-Faced Saviour" (web-single, 2007)
