= The 1st Chapter (album) =

Studio album by Circus Maximus
- Released: May 14, 2005
- Recorded: 2004 at Lionheart Studios, Toproom Studios and Noisegate Studios
- Genre: Progressive metal
- Length: 69:53
- Label: Frontiers (EU)
- Producer: Circus Maximus

Circus Maximus chronology
The 1st Chapter (2005)	Isolate (2007)

Professional ratings
Review scores
Source	Rating
Allmusic	4.5/5 stars
Sputnikmusic	4/5 stars
Metal Storm	10/10 stars
Blabbermouth	8.5/10 stars
Rock Reviews	8.5/10 stars

The 1st Chapter is the debut album by the Norwegian progressive metal band, Circus Maximus. The 1st Chapter was released on May 14, 2005 in Norway and on June 7, 2005 in the United States. The ongoing theme of The 1st Chapter is about "the journey" to salvation expressed through the lyrics. Musically, it sports a circus-like theme (that actually can be heard) playing throughout the album.

The lyrics to the song "Glory of the Empire" refer heavily to the 2000 film, Gladiator.

The 1st Chapter contains the longest running Circus Maximus song with "The 1st Chapter" running for 19 minutes and 7 seconds.

== Track listing ==
No.	Title	Lyrics	Music	Length
1.	"Sin"	Michael Eriksen	Mats Haugen, Truls Haugen, Glen Cato Møllen	5:53
2.	"Alive"	M. Eriksen	M. Haugen	5:38
3.	"Glory of the Empire"	M. Eriksen	M. Haugen, Espen Storø, T. Haugen	10:27
4.	"Biosfear"	(Instrumental)	T. Haugen, M. Haugen, E. Storø	5:22
5.	"Silence from Angels Above"	M. Haugen	M. Haugen	4:07
6.	"Why Am I Here?"	T. Haugen, M. Haugen, M. Eriksen	M. Haugen, T. Haugen	6:05
7.	"The Prophecy"	M. Eriksen, M. Haugen	M. Haugen, T. Haugen	6:44
8.	"The 1st Chapter"	T. Haugen, M. Haugen, M. Eriksen	E. Storø, M. Haugen, T. Haugen	19:07

=== Bonus Tracks ===
Demo Track Bonus for Europe Only
No.	Title	Length
9.	"Haunted Dreams"	7:12

Demo Track Bonus for United States Only
No.	Title	Lyrics	Music	Length
9.	"Imperial Destruction"	M. Haugen, M. Eriksen	M. Haugen, T. Haugen, E. Storø	6:45

Demo Track Bonus for Japan Only
No.	Title	Length
9.	"Marion"	6:12

== Personnel ==
- Michael Eriksen – vocals
- Mats Haugen – guitars
- Truls Haugen – drums, backing vocals
- Glen Cato Møllen – bass guitar
- Espen Storø – keyboards

== Production ==
- Produced by Circus Maximus
- Mixed and mastered by Tommy Hansen (Jailhouse Studios)
- Artwork by Mattias Norèn (Progart Media)
- Layout and logo by Claus Jensen (Intromental Design)
