= Out of Respect for the Dead =

Studio album by Grave
- Released: 16 October 2015
- Recorded: 2014–2015
- Studio: Studio Soulless, Stockholm
- Genre: Death metal
- Length: 48:20
- Label: Century Media
- Producer: Ola Lindgren

Grave chronology
Endless Procession of Souls (2012)	Out of Respect for the Dead (2015)

Professional ratings
Review scores
Source	Rating
Dead Rhetoric	8/10
Louder Sound	6/10
Metal.de	8/10
Metal1.info	7/10

Out of Respect for the Dead is the eleventh studio album by Swedish death metal band Grave. It was released on 16 October 2015 through Century Media Records. The album has received several moderately positive reviews.

Guitarist/vocalist Ola Lindgren has stated that lyrical themes for the album include "religious stupidity, life and death and everything in between, blood and guts and the supernatural." Recording for the album began in 2014 but was put on hold when drummer Ronnie Bergerståhl suffered a near-fatal heart attack on Christmas that year.

== Track listing ==
No.	Title	Length
1.	"Intro / Mass Grave Mass"	5:35
2.	"Flesh Before My Eyes"	5:16
3.	"Plain Pine Box"	4:23
4.	"Out of Respect for the Dead"	4:11
5.	"The Ominous "They""	5:26
6.	"Redeemed Through Hate"	4:43
7.	"Deified"	4:26
8.	"Trail of Ungodly Trades"	4:35
9.	"Grotesque Glory"	9:45
Total length:		48:20

== Personnel ==
Grave

- Ola Lindgren – guitars, vocals
- Mika Lagrén – guitars
- Tobias Cristiansson – bass
- Ronnie Bergerståhl – drums

Production

- Ola Lindgren – recording, engineering, mixing, mastering, producer
- Costin Chioreanu – cover art, layout
- Steven Chew – photography
