= Extremely Rotten Live =

Live album by Grave
- Released: 26 August 1997
- Recorded: 21–22 September 1996
- Genre: Death metal
- Length: 55:53
- Label: Century Media Records

Grave chronology
Hating Life (1996)	Extremely Rotten Live (1997)	Back from the Grave (2002)

Professional ratings
Review scores
Source	Rating
AllMusic	2/5 stars

Extremely Rotten Live is a live album by Swedish death metal band Grave, was released in 1997.

At the time, this was the final recorded work by the band before their temporary break-up, and is rather infamous amongst its fanbase as a result of a lack of proper crowd interaction and the energy seemingly being drained from the group as they performed.

== Track listing ==
No.	Title	Length
1.	"Extremely Rotten Flesh"	4:55
2.	"Turning Black"	4:05
3.	"Restrained"	3:35
4.	"Winternight"	2:50
5.	"Haunted"	3:44
6.	"Two of Me"	2:25
7.	"Hating Life"	3:03
8.	"You'll Never See"	5:08
9.	"Lovesong"	2:51
10.	"Sorrowfilled Moon"	3:58
11.	"Rain"	3:33
12.	"Soulless"	2:52
13.	"And Here I Die... (Satisfied)"	4:23
14.	"Into the Grave"	4:03
15.	"Reborn Miscarriage"	4:22
Total length:		55:53

== Personnel ==
Grave

- Ola Lindgren – guitars, vocals
- Jonas Torndal – bass
- Jens "Jensa" Paulsson – drums

Production

- Paul Marr – recording engineer
- Tim Yasui – assistant engineer
