= Isolate (Circus Maximus album) =

Studio album by Circus Maximus
- Released: August 7, 2007
- Recorded: January – April 2007 at CM Studios, Moving Studios and Noisegate Studios
- Genre: Progressive metal
- Length: 54:41
- Label: Frontiers
- Producer: Circus Maximus

Circus Maximus chronology
The 1st Chapter (2005)	Isolate (2007)	Nine (2012)

Professional ratings
Review scores
Source	Rating
Allmusic	link
Metal Storm	(8.4/10) link
Blabbermouth	link
Lords of Metal	(90/100)

Isolate is the second full-length studio album by the Norwegian progressive metal band Circus Maximus. The album was released on October 24, 2007, in Japan, August, 2007 in Europe and September 4, 2007, in the US.

The cover-art for the album as well as a sample track containing an excerpt from the song "Wither", was released by the band on May 29, 2007, on the official Circus Maximus website. Like its former album, Isolate contains the same number of tracks (with the bonus tracks) and also track 4 is an Instrumental ("Biosfear" on The 1st Chapter and "Sane No More" on Isolate).

Isolate is also the first album to feature new keyboardist Lasse Finbråten after Espen Storø's departure at the end of recording of The 1st Chapter. Lasse Finbråten added more keyboard/synthesizer sounds to the album in both soloing and overall use. This is different from the previous album as Espen Storø's sound centered on the use of the piano.

The album entered the Norwegian national charts at number 70 in August, 2007.

== Track listing ==
All music and lyrics by Circus Maximus.

No.	Title	Length
1.	"A Darkened Mind"	5:33
2.	"Abyss"	5:00
3.	"Wither"	4:46
4.	"Sane No More" (Instrumental)	3:55
5.	"Arrival of Love"	4:10
6.	"Zero"	4:50
7.	"Mouth of Madness: I. Alone; II. The Dream; III. The Initiation; IV. The Secret; V. The Conflict; VI. The Awakening"	12:42
8.	"From Childhood's Hour..."	4:28
9.	"Ultimate Sacrifice"	9:17
10.	"Silence" (Japanese bonus track)	6:14

== Personnel ==
- Mike Eriksen − vocals
- Mats Haugen − guitar
- Lasse Finbråten − keyboards
- Glen Cato Møllen − bass
- Truls Haugen − drums

== Production ==
- Produced by Circus Maximus
- Mixed and mastered by Tommy Hansen (Jailhouse Studios)
- Artwork and layout by Mattias Norèn (Progart Media)
- Logo by Anja Sofie Haugen
