= Soulless (album) =

Studio album by Grave
- Released: 28 June 1994
- Recorded: Sunlight Studio 1994
- Genre: Death metal, industrial metal
- Length: 43:34
- Label: Century Media
- Producer: Tomas Skogsberg

Grave chronology
...And Here I Die... Satisfied (1993)	Soulless (1994)	Hating Life (1996)

Professional ratings
Review scores
Source	Rating
AllMusic	2/5 stars

Soulless is the third album by Swedish death metal band Grave. The band adopted a slower and deeper sound for this album, blending more experimental and industrial tones. A video for the title track was filmed.

== Track listing ==
No.	Title	Length
1.	"Turning Black"	4:31
2.	"Soulless"	3:08
3.	"I Need You"	4:18
4.	"Bullets Are Mine"	3:43
5.	"Bloodshed"	4:11
6.	"Judas"	3:00
7.	"Unknown"	3:37
8.	"And Here I Die"	3:40
9.	"Genocide"	3:46
10.	"Rain"	4:08
11.	"Scars"	5:32
Total length:		43:34

== Personnel ==
Grave

- Ola Lindgren – guitars
- Jörgen Sandström – vocals, bass
- Jensa Paulsson – drums

Production

- Peter in de Betou – mastering
- Tomas Skogsberg – producer
- Fred Estby – assistant producer
- Carsten Drescher – layout
- Tobbe Wallström – photography
