= Back from the Grave (Grave album) =

Studio album by Grave
- Released: 21 October 2002
- Recorded: March–June 2002 at Sunlight Studio, Stockholm
- Genre: Death metal
- Length: 43:13
- Label: Century Media Records
- Producer: Tomas Skogsberg, Ola Lindgren

Grave chronology
Extremely Rotten Live (1997)	Back from the Grave (2002)	Fiendish Regression (2004)

Professional ratings
Review scores
Source	Rating
AllMusic	4/5 stars

Back from the Grave is the fifth album by the Swedish death metal band Grave. It was released in 2002 on Century Media after a long hiatus.

== Track listing ==
No.	Title	Length
1.	"Intro"	0:43
2.	"Rise"	5:25
3.	"Behold the Flames"	4:32
4.	"Dead Is Better"	3:48
5.	"Receiver"	5:02
6.	"No Regrets"	3:34
7.	"Resurrection"	4:17
8.	"Below"	4:41
9.	"Bloodfed"	4:49
10.	"Thorn to Pieces"	6:22
Total length:		43:13

The first pressing of this CD contained a bonus CD containing three demos of the band

No.	Title	Length
1.	"Into the Grave"	6:15
2.	"Annihilated Gods"	5:04
3.	"Infernal Massacre"	6:11
4.	"Deformed"	5:58
5.	"Reality of Life"	3:34
6.	"Morbid Way to Die"	4:37
7.	"Sexual Mutilation"	4:41
8.	"Extremely Rotten Flesh"	4:34
9.	"Brutally Deceased"	3:52
10.	"Septic Excrements"	3:06
11.	"Reborn Miscarriage"	3:56

== Personnel ==
Grave

- Ola Lindgren – vocals, guitars
- Jensa Paulsson – drums
- Jonas Torndal – guitars
- Fredrik Isaksson – bass

Production

- Tobbe Wallström – photography (booklet photos)
- Caroline Hoffman – photography (band), arrangements
- Jacek Wiśniewski – cover art
- Henrik Jonsson – mastering
- Tomas Skogsberg – producer, engineering, editing, mixing
- Ola Lindgren – producer, engineering, editing, mixing, lyrics
- Carsten Drescher – layout, design
