= Dominion VIII =

Studio album by Grave
- Released: 21 April 2008
- Recorded: Soulless Studios (Stockholm), Sandkvie Studios (Sandkvie, Sweden)
- Genre: Death metal
- Length: 44:08
- Label: Regain
- Producer: Peter Othberg, Grave

Grave chronology
As Rapture Comes (2006)	Dominion VIII (2008)	Burial Ground (2010)

Professional ratings
Review scores
Source	Rating
About.com	4/5 stars
AllMusic	3/5 stars
Blabbermouth	7.5/10 stars

Dominion VIII is the eighth studio album by Swedish death metal band Grave, released in April 2008.

== Track listing ==
All lyrics were written by Ola Lindgren, except where noted.

No.	Title	Lyrics	Length
1.	"A World In Darkness"	Matti Karki, Ola Lindgren, Jonas Torndal	5:58
2.	"Fallen (Angel Son)"	Lindgren	4:56
3.	"Deathstorm"	Lindgren	4:33
4.	"Stained By Hate"	Ronnie Bergerstahl, Lindgren	4:10
5.	"Bloodpath"	Torndal, Lindgren, Bergerstahl	3:34
6.	"Annihilated Gods"	Lindgren	5:12
7.	"Sinners Lust"	Lindgren, Bergerstahl	3:55
8.	"Dark Signs"	Torndal, Lindgren, Bergerstahl	4:16
9.	"8th Dominion"	Lindgren, Bergerstahl	7:34
Total length:			44:08

Additional track released on the 2019 re-issue.

No.	Title	Writer(s)	Length
10.	"Rude Awakening (Prong Cover)"	Prong	5:58
Total length:			48:27

== Personnel ==
Grave

- Ola Lindgren – guitars, vocals
- Fredrik Isaksson – bass
- Ronnie Bergerstahl – drums

Production

- Olle Carlsson – photography
- Costin Chioreanu – artwork
- Henrik Jonsson – mastering
- Peter Othberg – recording (vocals), Mixing, producer
- Matti Kärki – additional lyrics on "A World in Darkness"
- Ola Lindgren – recording (music), lyrics
- Pepe – layout, design
