= As Rapture Comes =

Studio album by Grave
- Released: 25 July 2006
- Recorded: Studio Soulless, Stockholm; Vocals recorded at Abyss Studio
- Genre: Death metal
- Length: 41:15
- Label: Century Media
- Producer: Ola Lindgren, Peter Othberg

Grave chronology
Fiendish Regression (2004)	As Rapture Comes (2006)	Dominion VIII (2008)

Professional ratings
Review scores
Source	Rating
About.com	4/5 stars
AllMusic	3/5 stars
Blabbermouth	8.5/10 stars

As Rapture Comes is the seventh studio album by Swedish death metal band Grave. It was released on 25 July 2006 through Century Media Records.

== Track listing ==
No.	Title	Length
1.	"Intro – Day of Reckoning"	0:49
2.	"Burn"	6:24
3.	"Through Eternity"	3:45
4.	"By Demons Bred"	4:16
5.	"Living the Dead Behind"	6:26
6.	"Unholy Terror"	3:45
7.	"Battle of Eden"	3:38
8.	"Epic Obliteration"	4:03
9.	"Them Bones" (Alice in Chains cover)	2:32
10.	"As Rapture Comes"	5:34
Total length:		41:15

== Personnel ==
Grave

- Fredrik Isaksson – bass
- Jonas Torndal – guitars
- Pelle Ekegren – drums
- Ola Lindgren – vocals, guitars

Production

- Peter Tägtgren – engineering (vocals), mixing
- Jacek Wiśniewski – cover art, artwork (background pieces)
- Stefan Wibbeke – layout, design
- Olle Carlsson – photography (band)
- Henrik Jonsson – mastering
- Ola Lindgren – engineering, mixing, producer, lyrics
- Peter Othberg – engineering, producer
