= The Weight of Oceans =

Studio album by In Mourning
- Released: 18 April 2012
- Studio: Black Lounge Studio, Avesta, Sweden
- Genre: Melodic death metal, progressive metal, death-doom
- Length: 61.01
- Label: Spinefarm Records
- Producer: Jonas Kjellgren

In Mourning chronology
Monolith (2010)	The Weight of Oceans (2012)	Afterglow (2016)

Professional ratings
Review scores
Source	Rating
About.com	3.5/5 stars

The Weight of Oceans is the third studio album by Swedish melodic death metal band In Mourning, released on April 18, 2012. The album entered the Finnish charts at number 40.

== Track listing ==
No.	Title	Length
1.	"Colossus"	9:33
2.	"A Vow to Conquer the Ocean"	7:24
3.	"From a Tidal Sleep"	6:52
4.	"Celestial Tear"	7:43
5.	"Convergence"	8:35
6.	"Sirens"	1:31
7.	"Isle of Solace"	4:54
8.	"The Drowning Sun"	8:40
9.	"Voyage of a Wavering Mind"	5:49

== Credits ==
=== Musicians ===
- Tobias Netzell – vocals, guitars
- Björn Pettersson – guitars, vocals
- Tim Nedergård – guitars
- Christian Netzell – drums
- Pierre Stam – bass
