= Nine (Circus Maximus album) =

Studio album by Circus Maximus
- Released: June 1, 2012
- Genre: Progressive metal
- Length: 57:29
- Label: Frontiers

Circus Maximus chronology
Isolate (2007)	Nine (2012)	Havoc (2016)

Nine is the third full-length studio album by the Norwegian progressive metal band Circus Maximus. The album was released on June 1, 2012.

The album is being described as more melodic and dynamic than the previous album. The album is also more guitar-oriented. "The majority of the material on the new record was written by Mats Haugen and he has taken the music to a kind of simpler and more accessible approach, yet kept the progressive elements and the "nerve" that is Circus Maximus" says Truls Haugen. Circus Maximus will appear live in some selected shows in the summer before launching a full-scale tour in support of the new album.

Glen Cato Møllen, the bassist of the band, told about the differences among Nine and the other two albums: "Two huge elements in the new material are first and foremost the evolution of the songwriting and the accessibility of the music. When you combine that with a new sound and production, you have a pretty different outcome from what we did on “Isolate”. We have been and always will be super proud of what we accomplished with the previous albums, but I think we’ve taken it to the next level with the new stuff".

Professional ratings
Review scores
Source	Rating
AllMusic	4/5 stars

== Track listing ==
1. "Forging" (Mats Haugen) – 1:16
2. "Architect of Fortune" (Mats Haugen, Truls Haugen) – 10:12
3. "Namaste" (Lasse Finbråten, Mats Haugen, Truls Haugen, Glen Møllen) – 4:02
4. "Game of Life" (Michael Eriksen, Mats Haugen) – 5:01
5. "Reach Within" (Michael Eriksen, Mats Haugen) – 4:59
6. "I Am" (Michael Eriksen, Mats Haugen, Glen Møllen) – 4:20
7. "Used" (Mats Haugen, Truls Haugen) – 4:52
8. "The One" (Michael Eriksen, Mats Haugen) – 4:00
9. "Burn After Reading" (Mats Haugen, Glen Møllen) – 8:48
10. "Last Goodbye" (Michael Eriksen, Lasse Finbråten, Mats Haugen) – 9:59

== Personnel ==
- Michael Eriksen − vocals
- Mats Haugen − guitar, producing, programming, backing vocals
- Glen Cato Møllen − bass
- Truls Haugen − drums, percussion,
- Lasse Finbråten − keyboards, programming
- Christian Wibe – Percussion
- Christer-André Cederberg – Mixing
- Bjørn Engelmann – Mastering
