= Naglfar (band) =

Swedish melodic black metal band

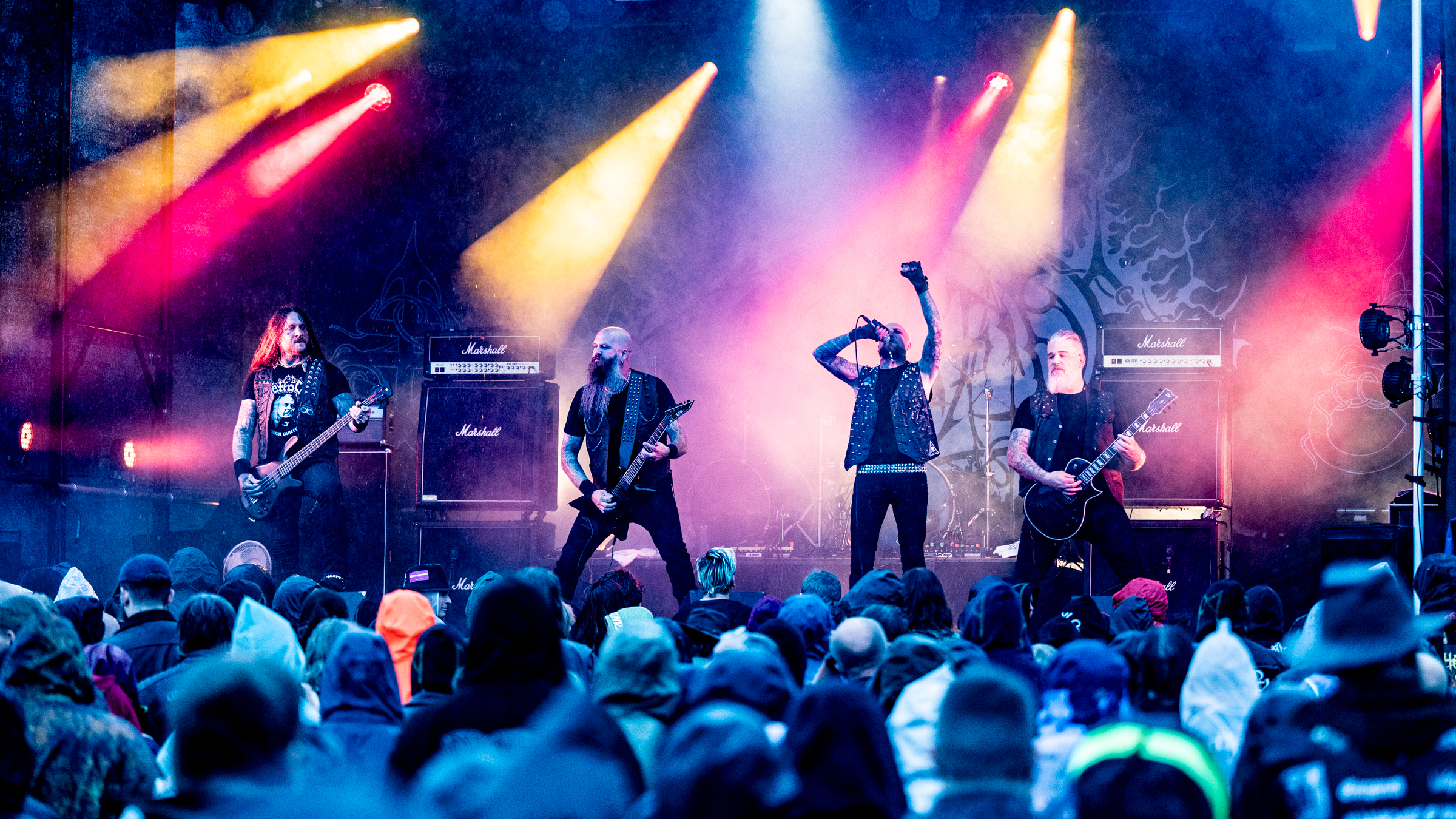
- Naglfar at Midgardsblot, Norway, 2023

Background information
- Origin: Umeå, Sweden
- Genres: Melodic black-death; melodic death metal; black metal
- Years active: 1992–present
- Labels: Century Media; Regain
- Members: Kristoffer "Wrath" Olivius; Andreas Nilsson; Marcus "Vargher" Norman
- Past members: Morgan Hansson; Fredrik Degerström; Mattias Holmgren; Ulf Andersson; Jens Rydén; Mattias Grahn; Morgan Lie
- Website: naglfar.net

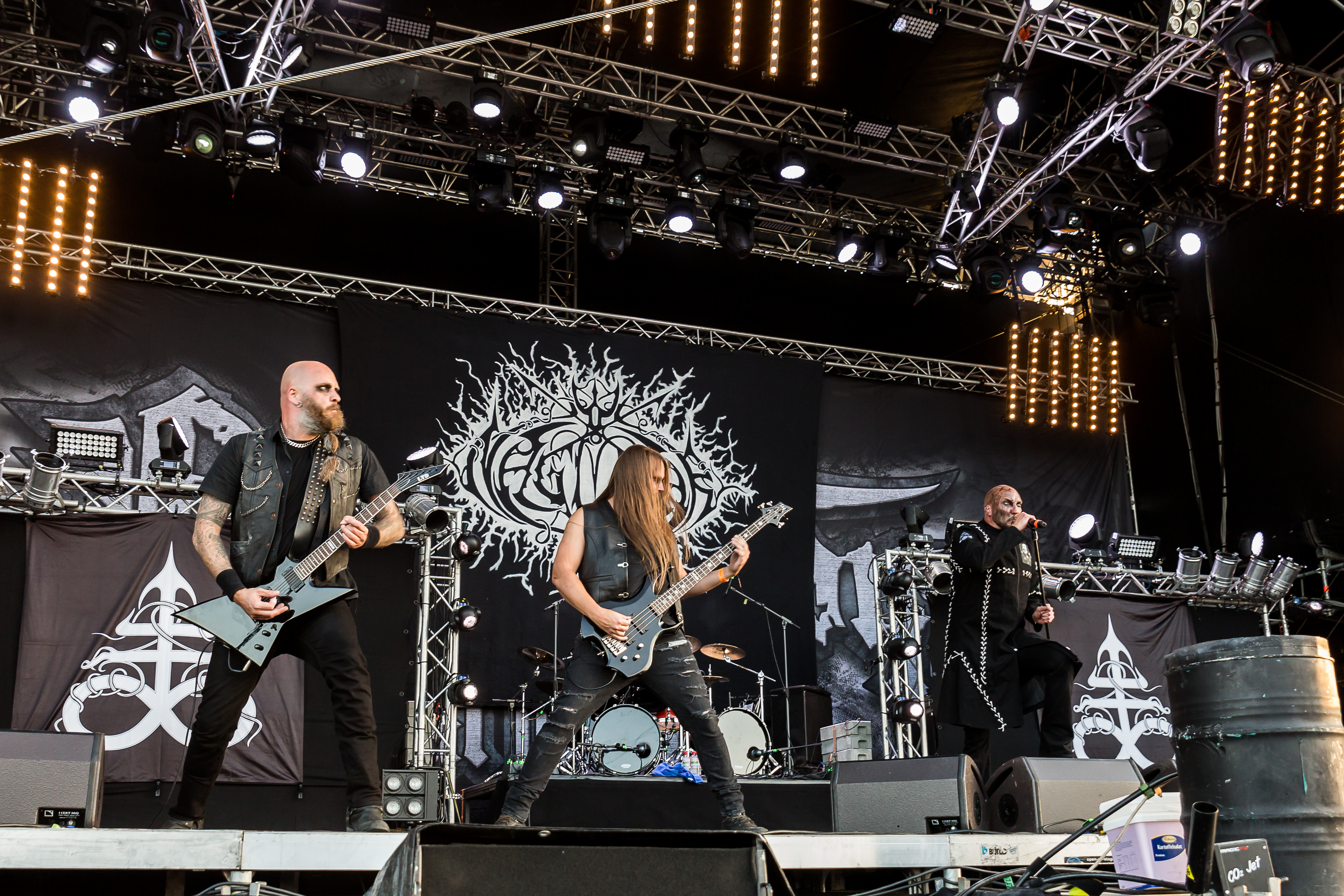
Naglfar at Party.San Metal Open Air 2019

Naglfar is a Swedish melodic black metal band formed in 1992. Jens Rydén and Kristoffer Olivius first established the group as Uninterred.

== History ==
Naglfar formed in 1992 as Uninterred, founded by Jens Rydén on vocals and guitar and bassist Kristoffer Olivius. The first full line-up included drummer Ulf Andersson from Nocturnal Rites and Morgan Hansson and Fredrik Degerström on guitars. With this line-up, Rydén concentrated on vocals. In March 1994, Degerström left Naglfar due to personal and musical differences. Soon after, Andersson left to focus on Nocturnal Rites. During this period, the band wrote and recorded the Stellae Trajectio demo at Garageland Studio. The demo was released in November 1994. Before the release, the band changed their name to Naglfar, after a ship in Norse mythology.

In early 1995, the band signed to Wrong Again Records. That summer, they released their debut album, Vittra, featuring drummer Mattias Holmgren. After recording, Holmgren left the band. Apart from contributing to an Iron Maiden tribute CD, the band was inactive for the next few years. Their second album, Diabolical, was released in 1998, with Mattias Grahn on drums. CMJ New Music Report described it as a "ferocious version of Swedish black/death metal...monumentally mind-blowing". The band signed with Century Media in 2002. Following more line-up changes and a European tour with Deicide, Naglfar recorded the EP Ex Inferis, which drew comparisons to Dimmu Borgir, and the album Sheol. The New York Times described the band as "one of the most compelling metal bands" and also "one of the most ridiculous," with their music described as "terrific". Rydén left the band after the album's release. Bassist Olivius took over lead vocals. Rydén recorded the 2006 album The Omega Rising under the name Profundi.

In 2005, the Pariah was released; AllMusic commented on its "shockingly profane lyrics". The album was followed by a tour with Dark Funeral across Europe, along with several festival dates. In December 2005, touring bassist Peter Morgan Lie became the band's permanent bass player. For their 2007 album Harvest, Roger Johansson directed a video for the track "The Darkest Road". The band toured the US in 2007.

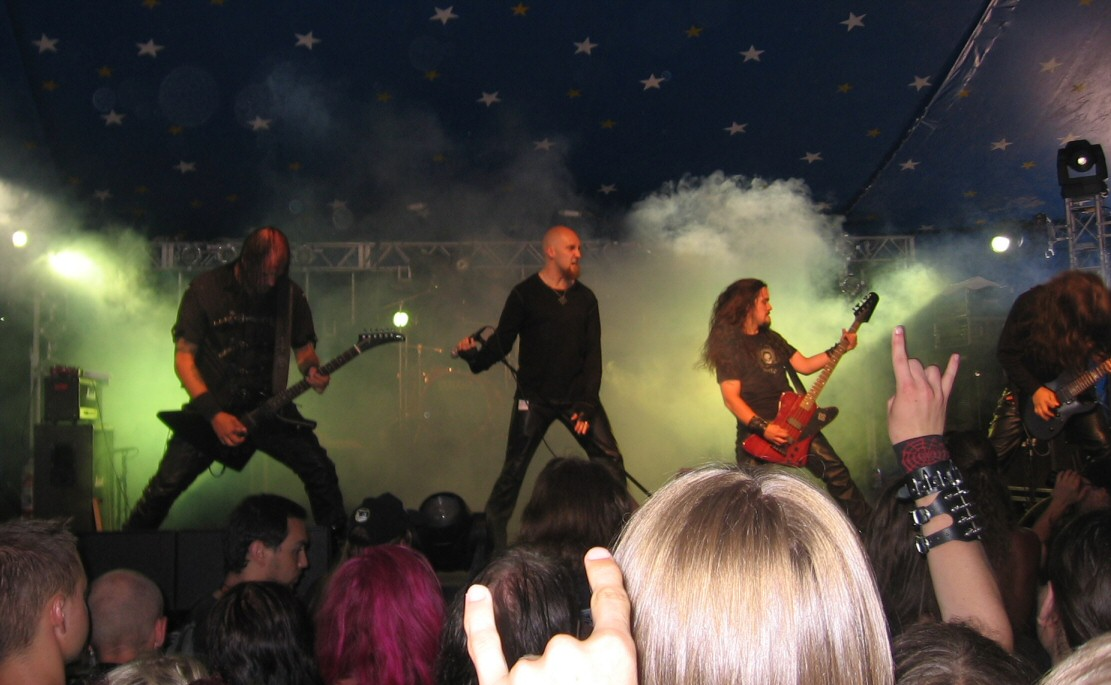
Naglfar at Tuska Open Air 2005

In August 2009, the band announced that they were about to begin recording a new album, without mentioning a release date. In December 2011, Naglfar launched their official Facebook page. On 22 December 2011, they announced the album Téras, released in March 2012. Dirk Verbeuren appears on the album as a session musician. In 2013, Naglfar performed at Wacken Open Air.

The band began writing their seventh album in February 2014. In 2020, the band confirmed that their album would be titled Cerecloth. The album was released on 8 May through Century Media.

== Members ==
=== Current ===
- Kristoffer "Wrath" Olivius – bass (1992–2005), lead vocals (2005–present)
- Andreas Nilsson – guitars (1993–present)
- Marcus "Vargher" Norman – guitars, bass, keyboard (2000–present)

=== Former ===
- Ulf Andersson – drums, percussion (1992–1994)
- Fredrik Degerström – guitars (1993–1994)
- Mattias Holmgren – drums, percussion (1995)
- Morgan Hansson – guitar (1993–2000)
- Jens Rydén – lead vocals, keyboard (1992–2005), guitars (1992–1993)
- Mattias Grahn – drums, percussion (1997–2011)
- Morgan Lie – drums, percussion (1995–1997), bass (2005–2011)

=== Session/touring ===
- Dirk Verbeuren – session drums (2011–present)
- Alex 'Impaler' Friberg - live bass (2012-present)
- Efraim Juntunen - live drums (2012-present)

== Discography ==
=== Studio albums ===
- Vittra (1995) – remastered edition (2002), Regain
- Diabolical (1998), Regain
- Sheol (2003), Century Media
- Pariah (2005), Century Media/EMI
- Harvest (2007), Century Media – limited edition with DVD (2011), Century Media/EMI
- Téras (2012), Century Media
- Cerecloth (2020), Century Media

=== Compilations ===
- Pariah + Harvest (2008), Century Media – box set

=== EPs ===
- When Autumn Storms Come (1998)
- Ex Inferis (2002), Century Media
- An Extension of His Arm and Will (2012), Century Media

=== Demos ===
- Stellae Trajectio (1994)
- We Are Naglfar – Fuck You! (1995)
- Maiden Slaughter (1996)
