= Endless Procession of Souls =

Studio album by Grave
- Released: 27 August 2012
- Recorded: Studio Soulless, Stockholm
- Genre: Death metal
- Length: 45:11
- Label: Century Media
- Producer: Ola Lindgren, Grave

Grave chronology
| Burial Ground (2010) | Endless Procession of Souls (2012) | Out of Respect for the Dead (2015) |

Endless Procession of Souls is the tenth studio album by Swedish death metal band Grave. It was released on 27 August 2012 through Century Media Records.

== Track listing ==
| No. | Title | Length |
|---|---|---|
| 1. | "Dystopia" | 0:35 |
| 2. | "Amongst Marble and the Dead" | 5:21 |
| 3. | "Disembodied Steps" | 5:42 |
| 4. | "Flesh Epistle" | 3:23 |
| 5. | "Passion of the Weak" | 4:36 |
| 6. | "Winds of Chains" | 5:37 |
| 7. | "Encountering the Divine" | 3:55 |
| 8. | "Perimortem" | 4:42 |
| 9. | "Plague of Nations" | 3:35 |
| 10. | "Epos" | 7:45 |
| Total length: | | 45:11 |

Limited deluxe edition bonus tracks
| No. | Title | Length |
|---|---|---|
| 11. | "Killing Technology" (Voivod cover) | 4:48 |
| 12. | "Efilnikufesin (N.F.L.)" (Anthrax cover) | 5:21 |
| 13. | "Mesmerized" (Celtic Frost cover) | 3:21 |

Double vinyl bonus tracks (including limited deluxe edition bonus tracks)
| No. | Title | Length |
|---|---|---|
| 14. | "Them Bones" (Alice in Chains cover) | 2:29 |
| 15. | "Burial at Sea" (Saint Vitus cover) | 8:37 |
| 16. | "Vermin" (Asphyx cover) | 4:02 |

== Personnel ==
Grave

- Ola Lindgren – guitars, vocals
- Ronnie Bergerståhl – drums
- Tobias Cristiansson – bass
- Mika Lagrén – guitars

Production

- Ola Lindgren – engineering, mixing, mastering, producer
- Costin Chioreanu – cover art
- Therese Larsson – photography
- Carsten Drescher – layout
