= Circus Maximus (Norwegian band) =

Norwegian progressive metal band

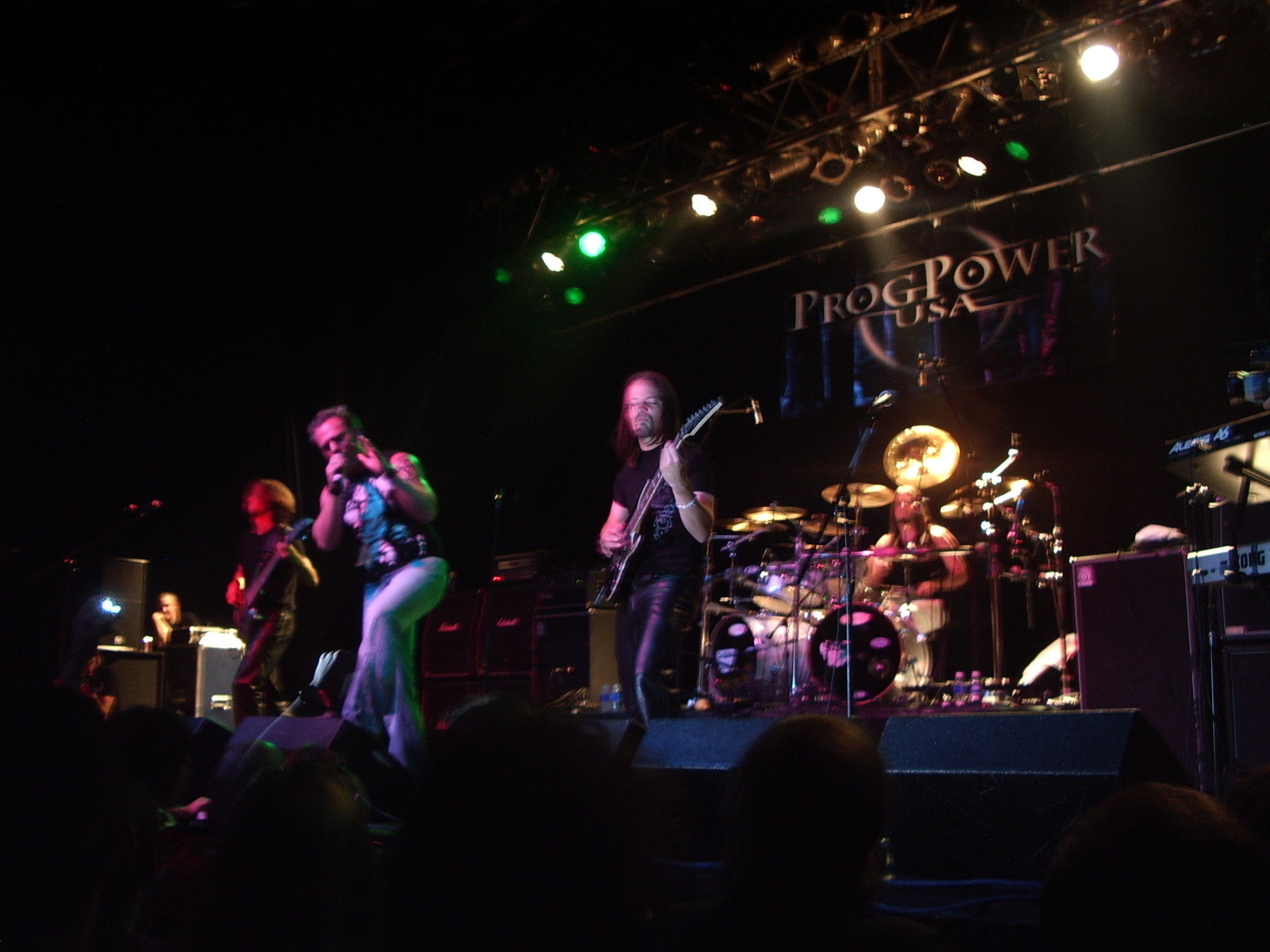
- Circus Maximus at ProgPower USA 2005

Background information
- Origin: Oslo, Norway
- Genres: Progressive metal
- Years active: 2000−present
- Labels: Laser's Edge, Sensory, Frontiers
- Members: Michael Eriksen; Lasse Finbråten; Mats Haugen; Truls Haugen; Glen Cato Møllen
- Past members: Espen Storø
- Website: CircusMaximusSite.com

Circus Maximus is a Norwegian progressive metal quintet from Oslo. They employ symphonic and power metal influences that feature synthesizers. As of 2016, they have released four albums: The 1st Chapter in 2005, Isolate in 2007, Nine in 2012 and Havoc in 2016.

== History ==
=== Formation and early history (2000–2003) ===
In 2000 longtime bandmates Michael Eriksen (vocals) and brothers Mats (guitar) and Truls Haugen (drums) were joined by keyboard player Espen Storø and Glen Cato Møllen on bass to form Circus Maximus.

Initially a cover band, their interpretations of technically challenging material from bands like Dream Theater and Symphony X earned them a lot of positive feedback. Before long, the band started to write their own material: With other influences varying from pop/rock through classical progressive rock to heavy metal and death metal, their music synergized into a mixture of melodic and groovy sound with many heavy riffs and odd time signatures. The musical press has compared their sound to Queensrÿche, TNT, Dream Theater, Symphony X and the like, in addition to the aforementioned bands.

Releasing two demos to great reviews in Norway, as well as in Europe and United States, before signing with Danish Intromental Management in April 2004, the band made a record deal with American Sensory Records for the US and Canada, which in turn forwarded a licensing deal for Europe and Russia to Frontiers Records.

=== The 1st Chapter (2004–2006) ===
Circus Maximus began writing their debut album in 2004. Entitled The 1st Chapter, it was released in May 2005. The eight-track album contains the longest Circus Maximus song with the title track running over 19 minutes. The album also came with two bonus tracks.

Half a year later, in November 2005, keyboard player Espen Storø left the band for personal reasons. In early 2006, Lasse Finbråten (formerly of Norwegian progressive/power metal band Tritonus) joined the band, filling the vacant spot.

During 2005, Circus Maximus went on their first tour with their major performance being in Atlanta in the United States, where they played at the ProgPower festival. Circus Maximus returned to the same festival the following year with their new keyboardist. During the rest of 2006, Circus Maximus continued to play gigs around Scandinavia with other major acts such as Kamelot, Pagan's Mind and Glenn Hughes.

=== Isolate (2007) ===
Circus Maximus spent the first quarter of 2007 recording their second studio album, Isolate, which was released on August 7, 2007. Before the release, as a response to impatient and expectant fans, the band established a post on the official Circus Maximus forum where they kept readers up-to-date on their studio progress. Following the release of Isolate, the band went on tour playing at major festivals such as ProgPower Europe, ProgPower Scandinavia, Sweden Rock and MetalHear. They also went on many solo shows while on the road.

From February 13 to March 5, 2008 the band toured Europe as an opening act (along with German progressive metal band Dreamscape) at the Symphony X Paradise Lost Tour 2008.

On November 18 the band posted this message on their website: "Circus Maximus will now be entering the studio to start the pre-production of the next album, planned to be released late 2010. We are writing new stuff everyday and so far we have more or less 8 songs completed for the album and we can honestly tell you it sounds AMAZING! Can't wait to show you ;) We would like to thank everyone who have been supporting us throughout the years... you're the best! - Truls, Mats, Lasse, Glen and Michael."

According to the band's official forums, on 22 June 2010 Michael Eriksen posted some news on the recording process: "Yesterday Mats and myself hit the studio to start the vocals on one of the tracks". He later mentioned that "We will have some videos up and running for you in a bit".

=== Nine (2012–2015) ===
The third album, called Nine, was released on 1 June 2012. The band described the album as both more melodic and more dynamic than their two preceding albums.

=== Havoc (2016–2017) ===
The first single from Havoc, "The Weight", was released on 19 January 2016. Vocalist Michael Eriksen was later a guest singer on Ayreon's ninth studio album, titled The Source.

=== Live albums (2017–present) ===
The first of Circus Maximus' live albums, Havoc in Oslo, was released on 4 August 2017, featuring songs from all four of the previous albums but with a bias towards their newer songs.

The second live album arrived on 6 September 2019, entitled Nine Live. It contains a live performance of their entire 2012 album Nine.

The Band released in 2019, the EP Isolated Chapters. This release was originally left-overs from their second album Isolate. The EP consists of two songs "Phasing Mirrors" and "Endgame".

In 2026 the band is writing material for their fifth and so far unnamed album.

== Band members ==
=== Current ===
- Michael Eriksen – vocals (2000–present)
- Mats Haugen – guitars/backing vocals (2000–present)
- Truls Haugen – drums, screaming (2000–present)
- Glen Cato Møllen – bass guitar/backing vocals (2000–present)
- Lasse Finbråten – keyboards/backing vocals (2005–present)

=== Former ===
- Espen Storø – keyboards (2000–2005)

== Discography ==
Studio albums

- The 1st Chapter (2005)
- Isolate (2007)
- Nine (2012)
- Havoc (2016)

Live albums

- Havoc in Oslo (2017)
- Nine Live (2019)

EPs

- Isolated Chapters (2019)
