= April Divine =

Swedish rock band

- Also known as: Starfuck, Bloody April
- Origin: Umeå/Skellefteå, Sweden
- Genres: Alternative Rock; Alternative Metal
- Years active: 1996 - present
- Labels: Supernova Records/Bonnier Amigo Music Group; Asom Records
- Members: Joakim Åström; Elias Ortiz; Johnny Johansson
- Past members: Mikael Hållander; P-O Sedin; Jan Karlsson; Lars Sjödin; Ante Lundqvist; Nicke Westberg; Per Karlsson; Peter Uvén; Emil Holmgren; Elmer Hallsby
- Website: aprildivine.com

April Divine (formerly Starfuck and Bloody April) is a Swedish rock band. They are currently signed to Asom Records (AD III). Their previous albums were released on the labels Supernova Records/Bonnier Amigo Music Group (Redemption) and Ninetone Records (Chapter One).

== History ==
April Divine was founded in 1996 under the name Starfuck. They played all around Sweden got signed for their first album - Chapter one in 2006. Due to international marketing they had to change the band name.

In January 2006, they were signed to Swedish indie-label Ninetone Records. Union Entertainment Group was willing to distribute their album Chapter One, released on 29 January, in 2007. In January 2007, they opened for the band Staind at Nalen in Stockholm. Due to the success of this concert, Ema Telstar / Live Nation, a booking company, started a relationship with the band. This relationship led to a tour across Sweden.

2007 Andreas (Ante) Lundqvist left the band for personal reasons. He was replaced by Peter Uvén. 2008 April Divine recorded a new album in Atlanta. The mission to produce it went to Rick Beato (Vince Neil, Bullet for My Valentine, Shinedown).

26 February 2010, the band announced a new record deal with Supernova Records/Bonnier Amigo Music Group. On March 3 April Divine opened for Australian band Karnivool, together with Swedish band Librah at Debaser Medis in Stockholm. Their new single “Redemption” was released for purchase at iTunes and CDON in SwedenOn Mars 22nd and the new album Redemption was released on 19 May.

In October 2010 April divine was to be the supporting act for American rock band Alter Bridge for the band's three performances in Sweden in November 2010.

April divine also went overseas and toured Costa Rica with Costa Rican rockband Akasha. They also did the music video for the song ″Faced Down″ in Costa, with their newfound friends in Akasha and Brian Marshall (The location of the video is shot in the bay of Brian's house/hotel).

April divine also did some shows in the US, New York and Los Angeles where their former manager David Brown helped them. They played Muse Expo in LA.

April Divine have been opening for American rock band Staind two times in Sweden. Good relations lead to that April Divine was to be the opening act for the full European tour with Staind in 2011.

2012 was calm year and Peter and Per left the band, and in 2013 April Divine announced the new drummer Emil and bass player Elmer.

In April 2013 April Divine released the album AD III on the label Asom Records, and was supposed to follow up with a tour in Europe which was canceled due to bass player Elmer left the band due to moving, and Emil left the band due to committing for his other band.

In 2013 the label Asom Records did some groundbreaking distribution - they created an iOS app for the band “April Divine iOS” where some extra songs on top of AD III was released.

In 2014 they released a single “We Are Rangers” During search of a new bass player April Divine went back to the studio and created AD IV and announced release date in 2015, on their own label, Asom records, World Wide.

== Current members ==
- Joakim Åström - guitar, vocals (1996–present)
- Johnny Johansson - guitar (2009–present)
- Elias Ortis - drums (2014–present)

== Former members ==
- Lars Sjödin - guitar (1996–1997)
- Jan Karlsson - guitar (1997–1998)
- Mikael Hållander- bass (1996–1998)
- P-O (Per-Olof) Sedin - bass (1998–2006)
- Ante (Andreas) Lundqvist - bass (2006–2007)
- Nicke (Niklas) Westberg - guitar (1998–2009)
- Peter Uvén - bass (2007–2012)
- Per Karlsson - drums (1998–2012)
- Emil Holmgren - drums (2013-2014)
- Elmer Hallsby - bass (2013–2014)

== Discography ==
- Chapter One (2007)
- Redemption (2010)
- AD III (2013)
