= Burial Ground (album) =

Studio album by Grave
- Released: 14 June 2010
- Recorded: Studio Soulless, Stockholm
- Genre: Death metal
- Length: 42:06
- Label: Regain
- Producer: Ola Lindgren, Ronnie Bergerståhl

Grave chronology
Dominion VIII (2008)	Burial Ground (2010)	Endless Procession of Souls (2012)

Professional ratings
Review scores
Source	Rating
AllMusic	4/5 stars
Metal Hammer (UK)	8/10

Burial Ground is the ninth studio album by Swedish death metal band Grave. It was released on 14 June 2010 through Regain Records.

== Track listing ==
No.	Title	Length
1.	"Liberation"	3:40
2.	"Semblance In Black"	4:20
3.	"Dismembered Mind"	6:05
4.	"Ridden With Belief"	4:06
5.	"Conquerer"	4:45
6.	"Outcast"	3:40
7.	"Sexual Mutilation"	4:02
8.	"Bloodtrail"	4:05
9.	"Burial Ground"	7:23
Total length:		42:06

== Personnel ==
Grave

- Ola Lindgren – vocals, guitars
- Ronnie Bergerståhl – drums
- Fredrik Isaksson – bass

Guest musician

- Karl Sanders – lead guitars on "Bloodtrail"

Production

- Costin Chioreanu – artwork, layout, design
- Ola Lindgren – producer, recording, mixing, mastering, lyrics
- Ronnie Bergerståhl – producer, recording, mixing, mastering
- Matti Kärki – additional lyrics on "Dismembered Mind"
