= Monolith (In Mourning album) =

Studio album by In Mourning
- Released: 25 January 2010 (Europe); 16 February 2010 (USA)
- Genres: Progressive metal, melodic death metal, death-doom
- Length: 57:07
- Label: Pulverised Records
- Producer: Studio/Abyss Studio Grangärde

In Mourning chronology
| Shrouded Divine (2008) | Monolith (2010) | The Weight of Oceans (2012) |

Monolith is the second studio album by Swedish melodic death metal band In Mourning. It was released in Europe on 25 January 2010 and in North America on February 16, 2010. It will be re-released on 24 July 2020 via Agonia Records.

Professional ratings
Review scores
| Source | Rating |
|---|---|
| Sputnikmusic | 3.5/5 |
| Sputnikmusic | 4/5 |

== Track listing ==
| No. | Title | Length |
|---|---|---|
| 1. | "For You to Know" | 6:14 |
| 2. | "Debris" | 7:33 |
| 3. | "The Poet and the Painter of Souls" | 5:39 |
| 4. | "The Smoke" | 8:13 |
| 5. | "A Shade of Plague" | 4:09 |
| 6. | "With You Came Silence" | 6:09 |
| 7. | "Pale Eye Revelation" | 6:16 |
| 8. | "The Final Solution (Entering the Black Lodge)" | 12:51 |

== Credits ==
=== Musicians ===
- Tobias Netzell – vocals, guitars
- Björn Pettersson – guitars
- Tim Nedergård – guitars
- Christian Netzell – drums
- Pierre Stam – bass
