= Fredrik Isaksson =

Swedish musician

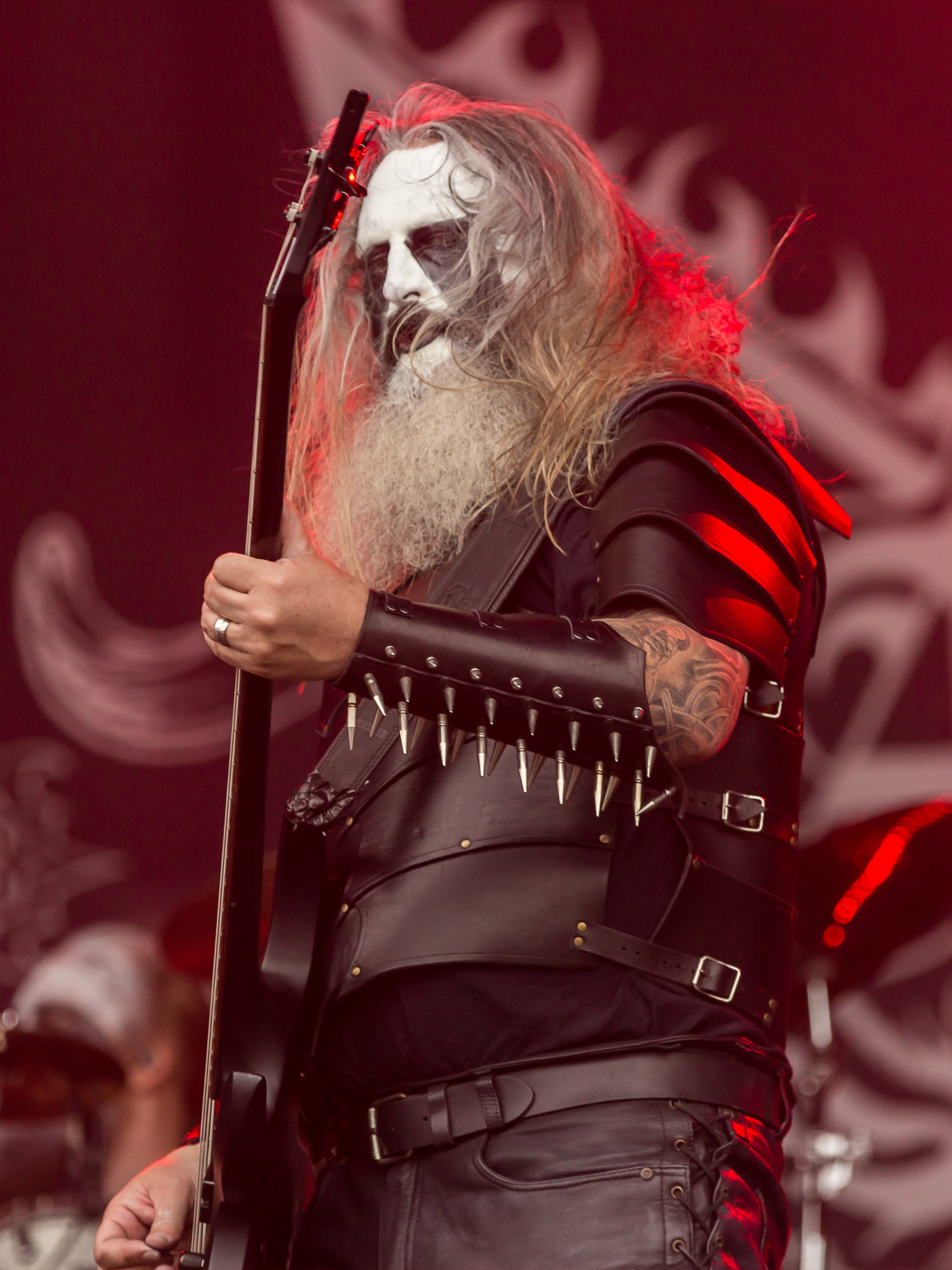
Isaksson performing with Dark Funeral in 2022

Fredrik Isaksson (born 1971), also known as "Freddan", is a Swedish bass player and was born in Stockholm. He has played in Subztain, Berzerker Legion and Dark Funeral. He has also previously been a member of symphonic metal band Therion (in 1994), and death metal bands Grave and Excruciate.
