= In Mourning (band) =

Swedish melodic death metal band

- Origin: Vansbro, Sweden
- Genres: Melodic death metal, progressive metal, gothic metal, death-doom
- Years active: 2000–present
- Labels: Agonia Records, Spinefarm, Pulverised Records, Aftermath Music, Dalapop
- Members: Tobias Netzell; Björn Pettersson; Tim Nedergård; Cornelius Althammer
- Past members: Sebastian Svalland; Joakim Strandberg-Nilsson

In Mourning is a Swedish melodic death metal band from Vansbro. They are currently signed to Dalapop. They have released seven full-length albums. Their latest, The Immortal, was released in August 2025.

== History ==
Apart from their debut album, the band has self-released several demos. Their debut album, Shrouded Divine, released on 2 January 2008 by Aftermath Music, received mostly favorable reviews from European music websites and magazines. Their second album, Monolith, was released on 25 January 2010 by Pulverised Records, with which they had a two-album contract.

On 29 November 2011, the band announced on their official website that Spinefarm Records would releasing their album The Weight of Oceans in 2012. The album entered the Finnish charts at number 40.

On 16 January 2014, it was announced that drummer Christian Netzell had left the band after 14 years due to musical differences. On the same day, it was revealed that drummer Mattias Bender would replace Netzell for their Trondheim Metal Fest show and for the rest of the 2014 tour season.

On 26 March 2014, In Mourning announced Bender would be their permanent drummer and was set to be involved in the recording of their new album.

On 22 December 2014, In Mourning announced that Bender had left the band and Daniel Liljekvist, formerly of Katatonia, would step in for the Poland and Norway shows.

On 20 May 2016, In Mourning released their fourth studio album, Afterglow, on Agonia Records.

On 4 October 2019, In Mourning released their fifth studio album, Garden of Storms, on Agonia Records.

On 24 July 2020, In Mourning re-released their second studio album, Monolith, through Agonia Records.

On 13 August 2021, Joakim Strandberg-Nilsson was revealed as Dark Tranquillity's session drummer for their upcoming tour in 2021 and 2022.

On 26 November 2021, In Mourning released their sixth studio album, The Bleeding Veil, on Dalapop.

On 1 March 2024, it was announced that drummer Joakim Strandberg-Nilsson left and was replaced with Cornelius Althammer, of the German band Ahab.

== Band members ==
Current

- Tobias Netzell – vocals, guitars (2000–present)
- Björn Petterson – guitars (2005–present), vocals (2011-present)
- Tim Nedergård – guitars (2006–present)
- Cornelius Althammer – drums (2024–present)

Former

- Tommy Eriksson – guitars (2000–2003)
- Christian Netzell – drums (2000–2014)
- Jon Solander – guitars, vocals (2005–2006)
- Mattias Bender – drums (2014)
- Pierre Stam – bass (2000–2017)
- Daniel Liljekvist - drums (2014-2018)
- Sebastian Svalland - bass (2017–2022)
- Joakim Strandberg-Nilsson – drums (2018–2024)

Touring

- Mikko Kivistö - bass (2026)

Timeline

== Discography ==
=== Studio albums ===
- Shrouded Divine (2008)
- Monolith (2010)
- The Weight of Oceans (2012)
- Afterglow (2016)
- Garden of Storms (2019)
- The Bleeding Veil (2021)
- The Immortal (2025)

=== Demos ===
- In Mourning (2000)
- Senseless (2002)
- Need (2003)
- Confessions of the Black Parasite (2004)
- Grind Denial (2006)
