= Téras =

Studio album by Naglfar
- Released: 26 March 2012
- Recorded: Wolf's Lair, Die Crawling Studio, Sweden
- Genre: Melodic black metal; Blackened death metal
- Length: 44:33
- Label: Century Media Records

Naglfar chronology
Harvest (2007)	Téras (2012)	Cerecloth (2020)

Professional ratings
Review scores
Source	Rating
Rock Hard (de)	8/10

'Téras is the sixth studio album by the Swedish black metal band Naglfar. It was released on 26 March 2012 through Century Media Records. This album marks their first release in five years and their first as a trio.

== Release ==
Téras was made available in various formats by the record label. It was released as a standard CD, a digital download, a limited edition deluxe CD digipak featuring a bonus track and a Naglfar logo patch, and finally as a deluxe gatefold double-LP on 180-gram vinyl (available in black or red), which also included the bonus track and an etching on side D.

Before the release of Téras, Century Media Records issued a 7-inch EP, limited to 500 hand-numbered copies. Titled "An Extension of His Arm and Will," it included the exclusive non-album track "As Long As They Fear."

== Track listing ==
All tracks are written by Naglfar

No.	Title	Length
1.	"Téras"	2:16
2.	"Pale Horse"	3:38
3.	"III: Death Dimension Phantasma"	4:15
4.	"The Monolith"	6:33
5.	"An Extension of His Arm and Will"	4:46
6.	"Bring Out Your Dead"	4:48
7.	"Come, Perdition"	5:42
8.	"Invoc(h)ate"	4:24
9.	"The Dying Flame of Existence"	8:11
10.	"Tired Bones" (bonus track on deluxe edition and LP)	5:12

== Personnel ==
=== Naglfar ===
- Kristoffer Olivius – vocals
- Andreas Nilsson – guitars
- Marcus E. Norman – guitars, bass, keyboards

=== Additional personnel ===
- Dirk Verbeuren – drums
- Matthias Jell – additional vocals ("Bring Out Your Dead")
- Matthias Eklund – mixing
- Göran Finnberg – mastering
- Niklas Sundin – artwork
