= Jörgen Sandström =

Swedish musician and singer (born 1971)

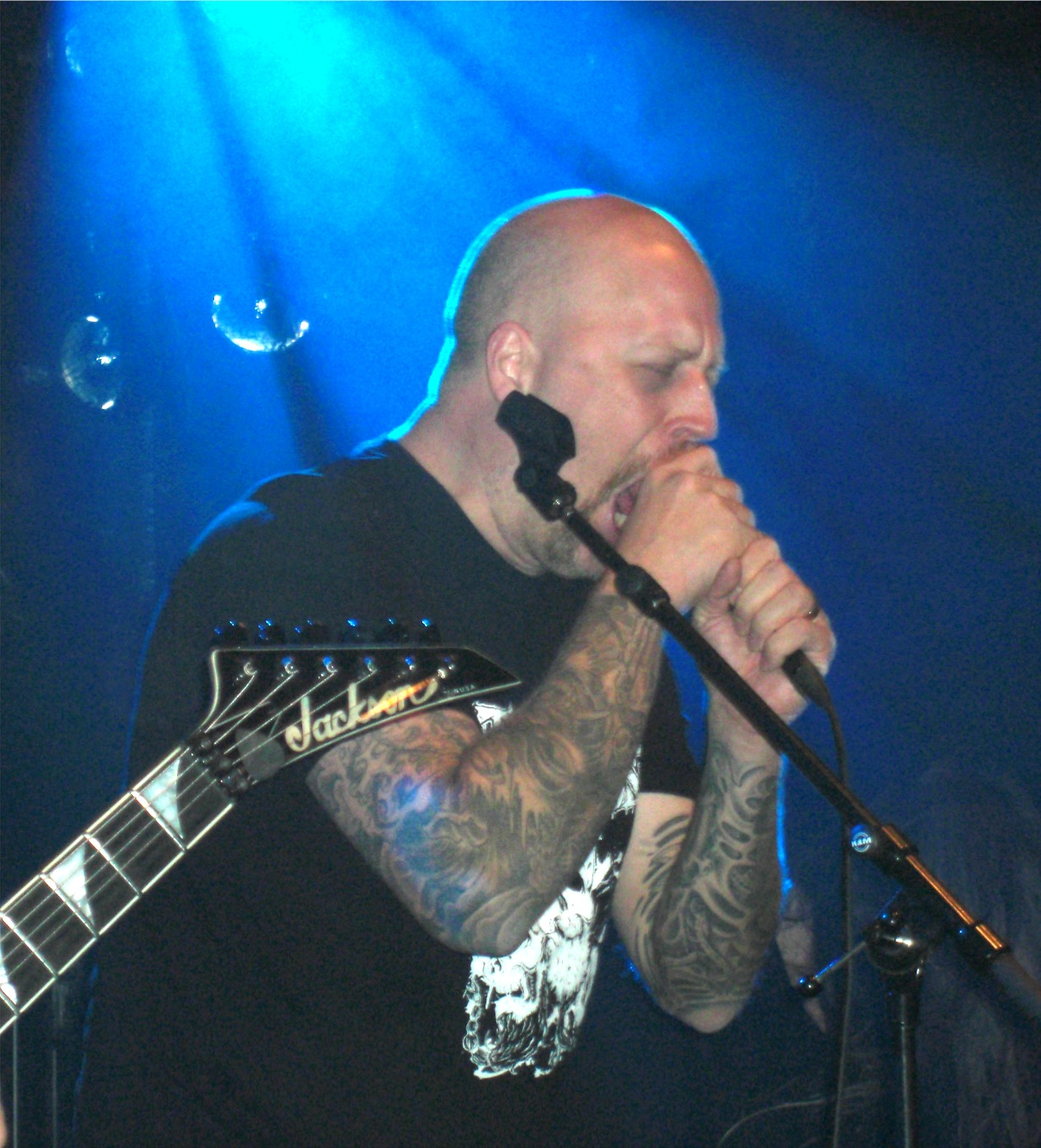
- Jörgen Sandström performing with Grave, Klubben Stockholm 2008

Background information
- Born: 13 November 1971 (age 54)
- Origin: Stockholm, Sweden
- Genres: Death metal; doom metal; thrash metal; black metal
- Occupation(s): Singer, musician
- Instrument(s): Vocals, bass, guitar
- Member of: Grave, Entombed, Krux, The Project Hate MCMXCIX, Domedagen, Firespawn
- Formerly of: Vicious Art, Torture Division, Candlemass

Jörgen Sandström (born 13 November 1971) is a Swedish musician. He provided vocals, bass and guitar for Grave on their first three albums and played with Entombed, on bass and backing vocals, between 1995 and 2004. He has also been involved with bands such as Krux (on Guitar), Vicious Art (on Bass/Backing Vocals), The Project Hate MCMXCIX (as Vocalist) and Torture Division (on Vocals/Bass). He also did guest vocals on Nasum's Helvete and on Death Breath's Stinking up the Night.

== Career ==
Sandström was a founding member of Grave, performing as lead singer and rhythm guitarist, although he switched to bass after the departure of Jonas Torndal. He left Grave after their third album, Soulless in 1995.

After his departure from Grave, he joined Entombed on bass. He stayed with this band until 2004, departing due to not wanting to tour.

While still with Entombed, in 1998 he was a founding member of The Project Hate MCMXCIX, an industrial death metal project which he still performs in as male vocalist.

In 2002 he co-founded doom metal band Krux as guitarist, along with vocalist Mats Levén (ex-Yngwie Malmsteen), bassist Leif Edling (Candlemass), and drummer Peter Stjärnvind (Entombed).

In 2004, after his departure from Entombed, he joined Vicious Art, as bassist and backing vocalist, alongside former Dark Funeral members Matias Makela and Robert Lundin. Vicious Art called it quits in 2011.

He was a founding member of Torture Division, alongside guitarist Lord K. Philipson (also of The Project Hate) and drummer Tobias "Tobben" Gustafsson (of Vomitory). This band disbanded in 2014.

In 2015, Sandström joined Candlemass as touring bassist, covering for Krux bandmate Leif Edling who was forced to sit out touring due to health issues. He shared bass duties with keyboardist Per Wiberg who performed when Sandström wasn't available. He played with Candlemass for several years.

In 2018, Sandström and Philipson founded death-doom project Domedagen, meaning Doomsday or Day of Reckoning in Swedish. The two have recorded several songs using programmed drums.

In 2022 Sandström rejoined Entombed again as bassist but also as lead vocalist for a one off show. He also returned to Grave in 2024.

In 2025, he joined Firespawn.
