= Grave (band) =

Swedish death metal band

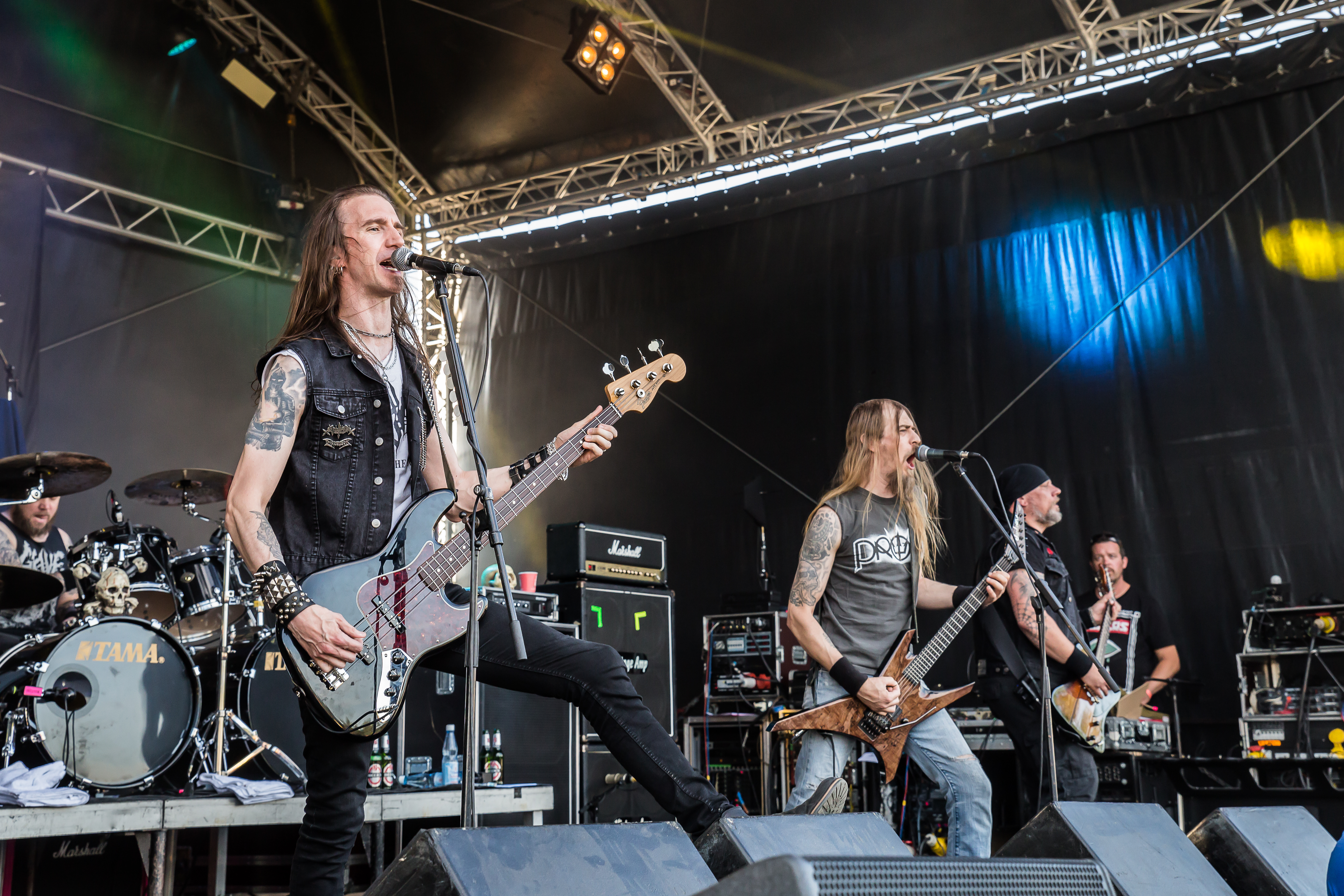
- Grave at Metal Frenzy 2016

Background information
- Also known as: Corpse; Putrefaction
- Origin: Visby, Sweden
- Genres: Death metal
- Years active: 1988–1996, 2001–present
- Label: Century Media
- Members: Ola Lindgren; Jörgen Sandström; Jonas Torndal; Jens "Jensa" Paulsson
- Past members: Ronnie Bergerståhl; Christofer Barkensjö; Pelle Eckegren; Fredrik "Fredda" Isaksson; Tobias Cristiansson; Mika Lagrén; Tomas Lagrén
- Website: grave.se

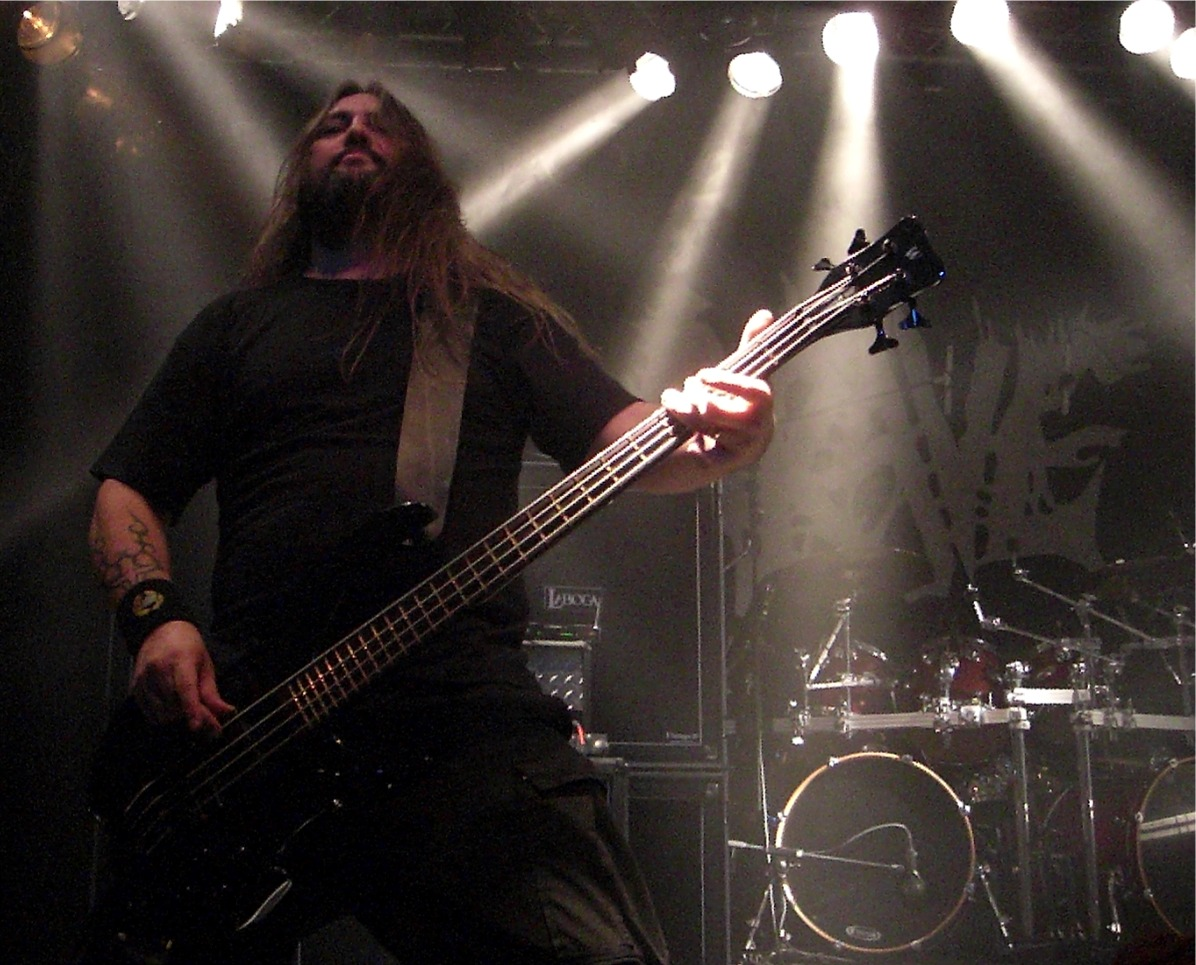
Fredrik Isaksson, former bass player (2008)

Grave is a Swedish death metal band that was formed in 1988 by vocalist and guitarist Ola Lindgren who is their only constant member. The band had particular success in the early 1990s, and their first four albums, Into the Grave, You'll Never See..., Soulless and Hating Life, cemented their reputation as one of Sweden's foremost death metal bands. Grave went on hiatus in 1997, but got back together two years later. Since then, they have released seven more albums, making a total of eleven studio albums. Along with Dismember, Entombed and Unleashed, Grave is considered one of the "big four" of Swedish death metal.

== History ==
=== Early career (1986–1993) ===
The band started in 1986 under the name Corpse and changed it to Grave in 1988. They recorded various demos from 1986 to 1991, and recorded some singles and EPs as well. Their debut full-length album Into the Grave was released in 1991. The release led to a European and American tour.

In 1992, the band released their second album You'll Never See..., which was a continuation of the style featured on their debut. However, bassist Jonas Torndal left the band as a result of his increasing dislike for touring. After unsuccessfully trying to find a replacement, the group made a decision to become a trio, with guitarist Jörgen Sandström switching to bass. A European tour followed with compatriots Dismember and headliner Morbid Angel.

=== Two more albums, hiatus and return (1994–2003) ===
The band's third album, 1994's Soulless, showed a somewhat different approach, blending more straight forward/groove elements into the death metal of the previous albums. Sandström departed in 1996, and Lindgren took over the vocals on their fourth album Hating Life. This album progressed further into the style started on Soulless. Another European and American tour followed, which resulted in the live album Extremely Rotten Live. Thereafter, the band more or less split up.

1999 was the first year the members rejoined and started rehearsing; nevertheless the band took it slow. Ultimately this led to a warm-up European tour and a new album in 2002. Back from the Grave was a return to the style featured on their second album, You'll Never See..., with minimal influence from Soulless. As a bonus, a CD containing three demo recordings was included with the album.

=== Fiendish Regression and As Rapture Comes (2004–2007) ===
The 2004 album Fiendish Regression saw the departure of drummer Paulsson, who was replaced by Coercion drummer Pelle Ekegren. This album showcased more aggressive and generally somewhat faster songs. Touring followed through Europe in conjunction with the Canadian band Cryptopsy.

Two years later in 2006, As Rapture Comes was released, further increasing the overall speed and aggression of the band's musical style. Noteworthy is the inclusion of the Alice in Chains cover of "Them Bones". In support of the album the band toured with Dismember, Vital Remains, Demiricous, and Withered through the US and Canada. In November 2006 they toured Europe as part of the Masters of Death tour, with Unleashed, Dismember, Entombed and Exterminator. In September, Grave embarked on a European tour with Nile for their album Ithyphallic.

=== Recent years (2008–present) ===
In 2008 the band returned with their eighth full-length studio album Dominion VIII. Stylistically it stepped back to the band's old-school death metal roots. The next album, Burial Ground, continued the same style. In 2010, Fredrik Isaksson left the lineup and was replaced by Dismember's Tobias Cristiansson.

In July 2011, it was reported that Grave was expected to begin recording their tenth album that fall and have it out in 2012. Titled Endless Procession of Souls, it was released on 27 August 2012, in Europe and in North America on the next day.

Grave released their eleventh studio album Out of Respect for the Dead in October 2015. On 4 September the band revealed the cover artwork of the album, which was created by Costin Chioreanu.

On 1 December 2017, Grave announced their split with their drummer for eleven years Ronnie Bergerståhl; six months later, the band hired Tomas Lagrén as his replacement. Grave has been in the process of working on a new album.

In January 2024, both Tobias Cristiansson and Mika Lagrén parted ways with the band. Live shows were canceled indefinitely.

In August 2024, the original line-up of Jorgen Sandström, Jens Paulsson and Jonas Torndal announced they would return to perform their first three albums in 2025. Lindgren later stated that the reunited original line-up had no further plans to tour or record. They reunited lineup played their first show in Stockholm on 5 April 2025. They are scheduled to play an "old-school" setlist at Maryland Deathfest in 2026.

== Members ==
=== Current members ===
- Ola Lindgren – guitar (1988–1996, 2001–present), lead vocals (1995–1996, 2001–present), bass (1995–1996, 2024–present), backing vocals (1988–1995, 2024–present)
- Jens "Jensa" Paulsson – drums (1988–1996, 2001–2002, 2024–present)
- Jörgen Sandström – lead vocals (1988–1995, guest 2008, 2024–present), guitar (1988–1992, 2024–present), bass (1992–1995, 2024–present), backing vocals (2024–present)
- Jonas Torndal – bass (1988–1992, 1996, 2024–present), guitar (2001–2008, 2024–present)

=== Former members ===
- Magnus Martinsson – guitar (2008–2011)
- Fredrik "Fredda" Isaksson – bass (2001–2010)
- Pelle Eckegren – drums (2002–2006)
- Ronnie Bergerståhl – drums (2006–2017)
- Tobias Cristiansson – bass, backing vocals (2010–2024)
- Mika Lagrén – guitar (2011–2024)
- Tomas Lagrén – drums (2018–2024)

== Discography ==
=== Full lengths ===
- Into the Grave (1991)
- You'll Never See… (1992)
- Soulless (1994)
- Hating Life (1996)
- Back from the Grave (2002)
- Fiendish Regression (2004)
- As Rapture Comes (2006)
- Dominion VIII (2008)
- Burial Ground (2010)
- Endless Procession of Souls (2012)
- Out of Respect for the Dead (2015)

=== EPs and singles ===
- Tremendous Pain (1991)
- ...And Here I Die... Satisfied (1993)
- Morbid Ascent (2013)

=== Live albums ===
- Extremely Rotten Live (1997)

=== Boxed sets ===
- Morbid Ways to Die (2003)

=== DVDs ===
- Enraptured (2006)
