= Ben Harding (musician) =

English guitarist

- Also known as: Nylons; Hot Grease
- Born: 1965 (age 60–61); London, England
- Genres: Punk rock; alternative rock; indie rock
- Occupations: Guitarist, vocalist
- Years active: 1987–present
- Labels: Way Cool, Decoy, Epic, Creation, Soviet Beret, Raritan
- Member of: The Charlemagnes; Senseless Things
- Formerly of: 3 Colours Red; Thee Faction

Ben Harding (born 1965) is an English guitarist, vocalist and songwriter from London, best known for performing in the punk/rock bands Senseless Things, 3 Colours Red and Thee Faction. Louder Than War called him "one of the UK's finest rock guitarists."

== Biography ==
Harding joined vocalist/guitarist Mark Keds, bassist Morgan Nicholls and drummer Cass Browne in pop punk/alternative rock group Senseless Things in 1987, completing the line-up of the band. Senseless Things released four studio albums and a Peel Sessions album between 1989 and 1995, had two Top 20 singles, and toured internationally. Harding is credited as songwriter on tracks including the 1993 single "Homophobic Asshole", from album Empire of the Senseless.

After Senseless Things split in 1995, Harding joined 'Britrock'/punk band 3 Colours Red with vocalist/bassist Pete Vuckovic, guitarist Chris McCormack and drummer Keith Baxter. Three Colours Red released two LPs and a series of singles/EPs between 1996 and 1999, achieving two UK Top 20 albums, and six Top 40 singles, including the Top 20 hit "Beautiful Day" before dissolution in 1999. The band played Sex Pistols' Finsbury Park comeback gig in 1996; they also supported Kiss and Aerosmith.

After a hiatus from the London music scene, Harding returned in 2009 joining Thee Faction as lead guitarist, a self-styled 'Socialist RnB' band in which members performed under pseudonyms. Thee Faction released four studio albums between 2010 and 2015 and played gigs on the post-punk circuit with artists such as the Membranes, Jon Langford, TV Smith, and the Darling Buds, as well as for political events and campaigns.

With Thee Faction no longer active, Harding joined garage band the Charlemagnes as lead guitarist in 2016; their first album Three Chords and a Half-Truth was released in 2018. The band have performed with groups such as Moving Targets, the Cravats, the Bellrays, Eight Rounds Rapid, Dealing With Damage, the Men of Gwent, Crazyhead and Gaye Bykers on Acid.

Harding joined Senseless Things for three reunion concerts in 2017, culminating in a farewell gig at Shepherd's Bush Empire.

Ben Harding appeared on Never Mind the Buzzcocks in 2003.

== Selected discography ==
=== with Senseless Things ===
- 1989: Postcard C.V. (album)
- 1991: The First of Too Many (album)
- 1993: Empire of the Senseless (album)
- 1994: Peel Sessions (compilation)
- 1995: Taking Care of Business (album)
- 1998: The Singles (compilation)

=== with 3 Colours Red ===
- 1997: Pure (album)
- 1999: Revolt (album)
- 2005: If You Ain't Got a Weapon... (compilation)

=== with Thee Faction ===
- 2011: Up the Workers! or, Capitalism Is Good for Corporations That's Why You've Been Told Socialism Is Bad All Your Life (album)
- 2012: Singing Down the Government, or, The War of Position and How We're Winning It (album)
- 2013: Good Politics: Your Role as an Active Citizen in Civil Society (album)
- 2015: Reading Writing Revolution: The Tendency of the Rate of Profit to Fall (album)

=== with The Charlemagnes ===
- 2018: Three Chords and a Half-Truth (album)
- 2025: Instant Gratification (EP)
