= Irrational Anthems =

Studio album by Skyclad
- Released: January 1996
- Genre: Folk metal
- Length: 53:09
- Label: Massacre Records
- Producer: Kevin Ridley

Skyclad chronology
The Silent Whales of Lunar Sea (1995)	Irrational Anthems (1996)	Oui Avant-Garde á Chance (1996)

Professional ratings
Review scores
Source	Rating
AllMusic	3/5 stars
Metal Hammer	6/7

Irrational Anthems is the sixth studio album by British folk metal band Skyclad, released in 1996. It was their first album without founding member Keith Baxter on drums and longtime guitar player Dave Pugh. The group remained a quartet, with Steve Ramsey overdubbing all guitars, and with the hiring of Paul Smith as session drummer.

The album marked the band's turn to a more folkier sound, moving away from the early years' thrash metal style.

The album title appears as a reference in the closing track "Quantity Time": Each moment in your company was of more quantity than quality. My hopes and dreams - transparent phantoms, this wayward son's irrational anthems.

It was released as a digipak and standard CD release.

== Track listing ==
1. "Inequality Street" – 4:05
2. "The Wrong Song" – 3:56
3. "Snake Charming" – 4:04
4. "Penny Dreadful" – 3:08
5. "The Sinful Ensemble" – 5:21
6. "My Mother in Darkness" – 4:00
7. "The Spiral Starecase" – 2:23
8. "No Deposit, No Return" – 4:30
9. "Sabre Dance" – 3:07
10. "I Dubious" – 3:12
11. "Science Never Sleeps" – 5:05
12. "History Lessens" – 3:38
13. "Quantity Time" – 5:14

== Personnel ==
- Martin Walkyier – vocals
- Steve Ramsey – lead, rhythm and acoustic guitars
- Graeme English – electric bass, classical guitar
- Georgina Biddle – violin, fiddle, keyboards

Additional musicians

- Paul Smith – drums
