= Another Fine Mess (disambiguation) =

Another Fine Mess is a 1930 short comedy film starring Laurel and Hardy.

Another Fine Mess may also refer to:

== Music ==
=== Albums ===
- Another Fine Mess (Back Door album), 1975
- Another Fine Mess (Skyclad album) or the 1995 title song (see below), 2001
- Another Fine Mess, by the Allniters, 2000
- Another Fine Mess, by Chesney Hawkes, or the 2005 title song, 2007
- Another Fine Mess, by Lindisfarne, 1995
- Another Fine Mess, a series of house/club albums released by Azuli Records

=== Songs ===
- "Another Fine Mess", by Glen Campbell, 1978
- "Another Fine Mess", by Skyclad from The Silent Whales of Lunar Sea, 1995

== Other media ==
- Another Fine Mess: 80 Years of Laurel and Hardy, a 2006 UK radio programme produced by Ashley Byrne
- "Another Fine Mess" (Bless This House), a 1971 television episode
- "Another Fine Mess", an episode of the TV series Seven of One

== See also ==
- Another Nice Mess, a 1972 comedy film by Bob Einstein
- Clearly in Another Fine Mess, a 2006 album by illScarlett
- A Fine Mess (disambiguation)
