= Jig-a-Jig (song) =

Single by East of Eden
- B-side: "Marcus Junior"
- Released: May 1970
- Genre: Folk rock
- Label: Deram
- Songwriter: Trad. arr. East of Eden
- Producer: David Hitchcock

East of Eden singles chronology
"Northern Hemisphere" (1969)	"Jig-a-Jig" (1970)	"Ramadhan" (1971)

"Jig-a-Jig" was a UK Top 10 hit single, released in May 1970 by the progressive rock band, East of Eden. It peaked at No. 7 in the UK Singles Chart in early 1971. It is also the title of a full-length album by the band. The piece is actually a set of three traditional reels, not jigs, namely "The Ashplant Reel", "Drowsy Maggie" and "Jenny's Chicken". The arrangement is based on electric violin with bass guitar and drums providing a rock rhythm backing. Electric guitar is used to underscore some of the high points of the fiddling.

In 2006, the British folk metal band, Skyclad, released their Jig-a-Jig EP, with the tune and three tracks from the recording sessions of the band's previous album, A Semblance of Normality. While the "Jig-a-Jig" is traditional, the arrangement of Skyclad's version is similar to East of Eden's, so it is sometimes considered as a cover version.
