= Martin Walkyier =

British singer (born 1967)

- Born: 20 September 1967 (age 58)
- Genres: Heavy metal; folk metal; thrash metal
- Occupations: Singer; songwriter
- Years active: 1985–present
- Member of: The Clan Destined
- Formerly of: Skyclad; Sabbat; Hell

Martin Walkyier (born 20 September 1967) is an English singer known for his involvement in the heavy metal bands Sabbat and Skyclad.

== Biography ==
Walkyier was born on 20 September 1967. He formed the bands Hydra and later Sabbat with Fraser Craske. He left Sabbat in 1990 and returned to the music scene with Skyclad, a band that blended heavy metal with folk music and helped pioneer folk metal.

After the release of ten albums, Walkyier found himself financially strained. He later remarked, "The insight that you can't live on dreaming came too late. Unfair contracts, incompetent advisers, poor decisions, and my naivety nearly broke me. I felt like I was in a marriage, not divorced because of the children."

Following his departure from Skyclad, Walkyier took a job as a nightwatchman for a furniture store. He performed occasional concerts under the name Return to the Sabbat and started a company called Prick Tees, which designed and produced T-shirts.

With bassist Iscariah he founded a new band, The Clan Destined. According to Walkyier, Iscariah left the band without explaining his reasons. Walkyier completed the album In the Big Ending but was disillusioned and announced it would be his last musical project. Martin Walkyier structured and arranged the music previously composed by Iscariah. The resulting album featured a DVD with a video for the song "A Beautiful Start to the End of the World," inspired by the novel Aimée und Jaguar. According to Metal Hammer journalist Detlef Dengler, the video "is professional and looks very expensive"; however, Walkyier noted that "it cost almost nothing." He continued, "The Clan Destined consists of Pagans with a common life philosophy as artists, designers, and filmmakers."

Sabbat reformed in 2006 to play a series of well-received shows.

In late 2008, Walkyier completed the recordings for The Clan Destined's debut album and recorded vocals for Hell's debut album. "Hell and especially their singer Dave Halliday were my idols in the early 1980s. My friends all listened to Metallica, but I was drawn to bands with image and true personality. The theatrics of bands like Hell influenced me tremendously."

With Walkyier's friend Andy Sneap, also "a fanatic Hell supporter," they approached the remaining three members after Halliday's suicide and offered to help them as singer and guitarist, modernising the old songs.

Walkyier also provided guest vocals for Cradle of Filth and Forgodsake.

In 2008 and 2009, Walkyier announced he was working on a rock opera. The story, entitled Plugging Hellfire, was published in Devolution magazine and illustrated by Neil Sims, with a biography contributed by Paul Stenning.

In October 2009, Walkyier announced that he was writing and recording new material for The Clan Destined.

== Reception ==
The late Metal Hammer journalist Detlef Dengler described Walkyier as a "great lyricist" noted for his extensive vocabulary and "brilliant puns". Author Paul Stenning has referred to Walkyier as a "lyrical genius".

== Discography ==
=== With Sabbat ===
- Blood for the Blood God EP, 1987
- Stranger Than Fiction Demo, 1987
- A Cautionary Tale/And the Brave Man Fails Split, 1988
- History of a Time to Come Full-length, 1988
- Dreamweaver Full-length, 1989
- Wildfire/The Best of Enemies Single, 1989

=== With Skyclad ===
- The Wayward Sons of Mother Earth Full-Length 1991
- A Burnt Offering for the Bone Idol Full-Length 1992
- Tracks from the Wilderness EP 1992
- Jonah's Ark Full-Length 1993
- Thinking Allowed? Single 1993
- Prince of the Poverty Line Full-Length 1994
- The Silent Whales of Lunar Sea Full-Length 1995
- Irrational Anthems Full-Length 1996
- Oui Avant-Garde á Chance Full-Length 1996
- The Answer Machine? Full-Length 1997
- Outrageous Fourtunes Limited Edition EP 1998
- Vintage Whine Full-Length 1999
- Classix Shape Limited Edition EP 1999
- Folkémon Full-Length 2000
- Another Fine Mess Live Album 2001

=== With The Clan Destined ===
- In the Big Ending Demo 2006

=== Guest appearances ===
During Walkyier's career, he has made several guest vocal appearances such as:

- A verse in the Forgodsake song "Skyhigh" from the Blasthead album (1994)
- Guest vocals on Cradle of Filth's cover of the Sabbat track "For Those Who Died" on Midian (2000) and on the song "The Snake-Eyed and the Venomous" from the deluxe edition of Thornography (2006)
- Guest Vocals on Torsohorse song "Face To Face" from 2006 album No Going Back
- Guest vocals on Skiltron's cover of the Running Wild track "Ballad of William Kidd" from the ReUnation – A Tribute to Running Wild album (2009)
- Verse on "Female Drugthing" on Pyogenesis' Love Nation Sugarhead EP, Nuclear Blast 1997
- Guest vocals on Nepal's song "Besando la Tierra (segunda versión)" from 1997 album "Manifiesto"
- Guest vocals on Tuatha de Danann's "Rhymes Against Humanity" from their 2015 album Dawn of a New Sun and on the song "Your Wall Shall Fall" from their 2019 EP "The Tribes of Witching Souls".
