= Jig-a-Jig =

Jig-a-Jig may refer to:

- Jig-a-Jig (song), a song by East of Eden
- Jig-a-Jig (EP), an EP by Skyclad
