= Radiator (band) =

English alternative rock/industrial band

- Radiator Album Cover

Background information
- Origin: London, England
- Genres: Alternative rock; industrial
- Years active: 1996–2000
- Label: EMI
- Past members: Jack Cooke; Janne Jarvis; Chris Rose

Radiator were a British alternative rock band, formed in 1996 by Jack Cooke, Janne Jarvis and Chris Rose. They released one album, also titled Radiator, which received 4 out of 5 when reviewed by Kerrang!, and their music appeared in the first Gran Turismo game (and on the commercially available soundtrack album) as well as in the film A Kind of Hush.

In September 1998 the band opened for the Backyard Babies and The Yo-Yos on their UK tours, while in February 1999 they promoted their "Make It Real" single by touring the UK with Tribute To Nothing and Pitchshifter before opening for Space Age Playboys in Europe. The band also toured the UK supporting Motörhead and Queens of the Stone Age.

The band's single, "Black Shine" which was released in 1998, and included a remix of the track by Nine Inch Nails member Charlie Clouser.

Radiator's first single, "Resistor", released on 16 March 1998 was mixed by Chris Sheldon.

The band's debut album Radiator was engineered, mixed and produced by the band themselves. Tracks 1,2,3,4 & 11 on the album were mixed by David Bascombe.

In 2001 Jarvis formed a new band Elevation with ex-3 Colours Red members Pete Vuckovic and Keith Baxter.

== Album ==
- Radiator (1999) – EMI

=== Track listing ===
1. "I Am"
2. "Black Shine"
3. "Generator"
4. "Amnesia"
5. "Resistor"
6. "Untitled Love Song"
7. "Whole Inside"
8. "Give"
9. "Make It Real"
10. "Feel"
11. "Who Is Your God"

== Members ==
- Jack Cooke – guitarist/vocalist
- Janne Jarvis – bassist/programmer
- Chris Rose – drummer/programmer
