= Lemming Project =

German band

Lemming Project is death metal group from Germany. Active from 1986 to 1993, they notably released two albums on Noise Records.

== Discography ==
- Negative Hatecore (1990, demo)
- Extinction (1991, Noise)
- Hate and Despise (1992, Noise)

Two tracks from Extinction were also released as a Noise Records promo together with two tracks off Skyclad's The Wayward Sons of Mother Earth.
