= Chris McCormack =

Chris McCormack may refer to:

- Chris McCormack (triathlete) (born 1973), Australian triathlete
- Chris McCormack (guitarist) (born 1973), with 3 Colours Red
