= In the... All Together =

Studio album by Skyclad
- Released: 22 May 2009
- Studio: Damage Inc. Studio, Ventimiglia, Italy
- Genre: Folk metal
- Length: 34:48
- Label: Scarlet

Skyclad chronology
A Semblance of Normality (2004)	In the... All Together (2009)	Forward Into the Past (2017)

In the... All Together is the twelfth studio album by the British folk metal band Skyclad, released in the year 2009.

"This album was recorded completely by the band members. There are no 'guests' or orchestras etc. This was a deliberate move to try to keep the recordings as 'live and fresh' as possible and one aimed at taking the band into the studio 'all together'. This wasn’t exactly a 'back to basics' strategy, as the songs on the new album are far from basic as the band continues to experiment with odd timings and tunings. Another benefit of this approach is that Skyclad will be able to play more of the album songs live."

== Track listing ==
No.	Title	Length
1.	"Words Upon the Street"	4:39
2.	"Still Small Beer"	3:13
3.	"A Well-Travelled Man"	4:40
4.	"Black Summer Rain"	3:52
5.	"Babakoto"	3:46
6.	"Hit List"	4:43
7.	"Superculture"	3:23
8.	"Which Is Why"	4:01
9.	"Modern Minds"	3:32
10.	"In the... All Together"	3:43

== Personnel ==
Skyclad

- Steve Ramsey – lead, rhythm and acoustic guitars
- Graeme English – electric bass, backing vocals
- Kevin Ridley – vocals, lead guitar
- Arron Walton – drums, percussion, backing vocals
- Georgina Biddle – violin, fiddle, keyboards
