= Keith Baxter =

Keith Baxter may refer to:

- Keith Baxter (actor) (1933–2023), Welsh actor and director
- Keith Baxter (drummer) (1971–2008), British musician
