= No Daylights... Nor Heel Taps =

No Daylights... Nor Heeltaps

Studio album by Skyclad
- Released: March 2002
- Genre: Folk metal
- Label: Demolition Records
- Producer: Kevin Ridley

Skyclad chronology
Folkémon (2000)	No Daylights... Nor Heeltaps (2002)	A Semblance of Normality (2004)

Professional ratings
Review scores
Source	Rating
Metal.de	9/10
Rock Hard	8/10

No Daylights... Nor Heeltaps is a re-recording album by British folk metal band Skyclad and the band's first recording to feature Kevin Ridley as the main vocalist. It is described as an "Irish Pub Album" with semi-acoustic versions of older Skyclad classics. Some versions feature a bonus CD with five extra songs.

There was some controversy raised over this release by former front-man Martin Walkyier and his fans because he was not credited in the booklet for writing the lyrics. Although nothing much arose from this affair, the band has not yet released any more re-recordings, instead focusing on new material written entirely by the current line-up.

== Critical reception ==
Powermetal.de recommended the tracks "Penny Dreadful", "Spinning Jenny", and "Another Fine Mess". Vampster said the album isn't bad but preferred the original Walkyier song versions.

== Track listing ==
Standard Edition 'Fine Ales'
No.	Title	Length
1.	"Penny Dreadful"	2:57
2.	"Inequality Street"	4:01
3.	"Spinning Jenny"	2:46
4.	"The Cry of the Land"	4:30
5.	"Another Fine Mess"	3:54
6.	"Sins of Emission"	4:46
7.	"The Widdershins Jig"	3:11
8.	"History Lessens"	3:58
9.	"Land of the Rising Slum"	2:54
10.	"Single Phial"	4:55
Total length:		37:42

Bonus CD 'Guest Ales'
No.	Title	Length
1.	"No Deposit, No Return"	4:44
2.	"A Great Blow for a Day Job"	4:15
3.	"No Strings Attached"	4:58
4.	"Building a Ruin"	3:46
5.	"Loco-Commotion"	3:03
Total length:		20:42
