= Folkémon =

Studio album by Skyclad
- Released: 23 October 2000
- Genre: Folk metal
- Length: 47:37
- Label: Nuclear Blast
- Producer: Skyclad

Skyclad chronology
Vintage Whine (1999)	Folkémon (2000)	No Daylights... Nor Heel Taps (2002)

Professional ratings
Review scores
Source	Rating
AllMusic	4/5 stars
The Encyclopedia of Popular Music	2/5 stars
Metal Hammer	6/7

Folkémon is the tenth studio album by the British folk metal band Skyclad. It is the last album the band recorded with Martin Walkyier as vocalist. As is normal with the band's works under Walkyier, the album's lyrical themes deal with politics, environmentalism, spirituality and personal issues.

The album's title was thought up after one of the band members read in a newspaper that, according to a survey, more children recognised the Pokémon character Pikachu than the current Prime Minister. The theme is continued in the liner notes, with the band members listed, for example, as 'Folkémon trainers'.

The front cover art and the three illustrations in the lyric-booklet are by Duncan Storr, longtime Skyclad collaborator.

== Critical reception ==
Exclaim! wrote that "the sextet prove that metal, fiddles, smart lyrical waxing and the occasional lager can mix neatly; the best examples being the sweet, sweet mayhem of tracks like 'The Great Brain Robbery', 'Think Back and Lie of England', 'The Anti-Body Politic' and 'Any Old Irony?'"

== Track listing ==
All lyrics are written by Martin Walkyier; all music is composed by Steve Ramsey and Graeme English. Bonus track written and composed by Edward Tudor-Pole. On US release (Nuclear Blast NBA6502-2), this bonus track was 'hidden'. Track 4 lyrics adapted from 'The Storm', a poem by Alison LR Davies.

No.	Title	Lyrics	Music	Length
1.	"The Great Brain Robbery"		Steve Ramsey	4:34
2.	"Think Back and Lie of England"		Graeme English	4:59
3.	"Polkageist!"		Ramsey	4:01
4.	"Crux of the Message"		Ramsey	4:52
5.	"The Disenchanted Forest"		Ramsey	7:10
6.	"The Antibody Politic"		English	3:18
7.	"When God Logs-Off"		English	3:09
8.	"You Lost My Memory"		English	5:57
9.	"Déjà-Vu Ain't What It Used to Be"		Ramsey	5:45
10.	"Any Old Irony?"		English	3:52
11.	"Swords of a Thousand Men" (Bonus track)	Edward Tudor-Pole	Edward Tudor-Pole	2:47

== Personnel ==
=== Skyclad ===
- Martin Walkyier – lead vocals
- Steve Ramsey – lead guitar, slide guitar, acoustic guitar, backing vocals
- Kevin Ridley – rhythm guitar, acoustic guitar, backing vocals, #2 solo on middle-section of 'The Disenchanted Forest'
- Georgina Biddle – keyboards, fiddle, backing vocals
- Graeme English – classical guitar, acoustic guitar, bass guitar, backing vocals
- Jay Graham – drums, percussion, keyboards, Jew's harp, hunting horn, backing vocals

=== Additional Musicians ===
- Tirza Abb – "Horny Huntress" on "Polkageist!"
- Averre Graham – penny whistle & Cor anglais
