= Wünderbar =

Single by Tenpole Tudor

from the album Eddie, Old Bob, Dick and Gary
- B-side: "Tenpole 45"
- Released: 17 July 1981
- Genre: Punk rock
- Length: 2:52
- Label: Stiff Records (BUY 120)
- Songwriter(s): Edward Tudor-Pole
- Producer(s): Alan Winstanley

Tenpole Tudor UK singles chronology
| "Swords of a Thousand Men" (1981) | "Wünderbar" (1981) | "Throwing My Baby Out with the Bathwater" (1982) |

"Wünderbar" is a song by Tenpole Tudor. Written by Edward Tudor-Pole and produced by Alan Winstanley, it was released by Stiff Records on 17 July 1981, and entered the UK Singles Chart on 1 August 1981, climbing to No. 16 and spending 8 weeks in the charts. It is a re-recorded version, somewhat faster than the version on the group's debut studio album Eddie, Old Bob, Dick and Gary.

== Critical reception ==
In ironic review in August 1981 David Hepworth of Smash Hits said that the band "had made a noise more normally associated with a coachload of Viking soccer hooligans" and summarised "these men should be locked up, failing that they should be stars."

== Track listing ==
7" single

1. "Wünderbar" - 2:52
2. "Tenpole 45" - 4:12

== Chart performance ==
| Chart | Peak position |
|---|---|
| Belgian Singles Chart | 2 |
| Dutch Singles Chart | 4 |
| UK Singles Chart | 16 |
