= Keith Baxter (drummer) =

English rock drummer (1971–2008)

- Born: 19 February 1971; Morecambe, Lancashire, England
- Origin: Lancaster, England
- Died: 4 January 2008 (aged 36)
- Genres: Folk metal Rock; Indie rock
- Instrument: Drums
- Years active: 1991–2008

Keith Baxter (19 February 1971 – 4 January 2008) was an English rock drummer.

== Biography ==
As a teenager he became a founder member of Lancaster thrash metal & drinking professionals, Aphasia, before leaving for folk metal pioneers Skyclad, recording five albums with them before leaving in 1995, to move to London and join 3 Colours Red, with whom he recorded two UK Top 40 albums (Pure and Revolt) and six Top 40 singles.

Following the split of the band in 1999, Baxter formed the band Elevation with former bandmate from 3 Colours Red, Pete Vuckovic. The pair signed with Sony but were dropped a year later. He moved back north to Lancaster, and briefly played with the Northern Irish band, Therapy? in 2002. 3 Colours Red formed again soon after that to record a third album (The Union of Souls), but split up again, permanently, in 2005.

Following this split, Baxter played with the Lancaster-based Baby Judas.

He died after suffering liver failure in January 2008.

== Discography ==
=== With Skyclad ===
==== Albums ====
- The Wayward Sons of Mother Earth (Noise International, 1991)
- A Burnt Offering for the Bone Idol (Noise International, 1992)
- Jonah's Ark (Noise International, 1993)
- Prince of the Poverty Line (Noise International, 1994)
- The Silent Whales of Lunar Sea (Noise International, 1995)

==== EPs ====
- Tracks from the Wilderness (Noise International, 1992)

=== With 3 Colours Red ===
==== Albums ====
- Pure (Creation, 1997)
- Revolt (Creation, 1999)
- The Union of Souls (Mighty Atom, 2003)
- If You Ain't Got a Weapon... (Sanctuary, 2005)
- Nuclear Holiday (Snapper, 2005)

==== EPs ====
- Paralyse (Creation, 1998)

=== DVD ===
- Live at Islington Academy (Secret, 2005)
