= Steve Ramsey =

Steve Ramsey may refer to:

- Steve Ramsey (American football) (1948–1999), American football quarterback
- Steve Ramsey (guitarist), British heavy metal guitarist
