= 3 Colours Red =

British rock band

- 3 Colours Red, 1997. L-R: Chris McCormack, Pete Vuckovic, Keith Baxter and Ben Harding.

Background information
- Origin: London, England
- Genres: Indie rock; punk rock; alternative rock
- Years active: 1994–1999 / 2002–2005
- Labels: Creation, Mighty Atom, Epic (US), Sanctuary
- Past members: Pete Vuckovic; Chris McCormack; Ben Harding; Keith Baxter; Paul Grant

3 Colours Red were an English rock band, formed in 1994 in London. They achieved their biggest chart success at the end of the 1990s, along with other British rock bands such as Ash, Stereophonics and Feeder. The band was named by sticking a pin in a London listings magazine, Time Out. It landed randomly on an advertisement for the concluding part of the Polish film director Krzysztof Kieślowski's, Three Colors, trilogy. They went on to record two UK Top 20 albums, and six Top 40 singles.

== Early history ==
In 1994, it was suggested by a mutual friend that bass player/singer Pete Vuckovic should contact guitarist Chris McCormack (ex-Forgodsake/Gunslinger) to start a band, as both had recently left their previous bands and were looking for something new. Due to location they spent the following months trading four-track recordings and developing song ideas via post, until they had enough material to record a three-song demo with newly acquired drummer Keith Baxter (formerly of Skyclad). Terry Thomas was hired as the band's manager as well as producer of the demos (the first to feature guitarist Ben Harding) that secured their recording contract.

McCormack is the younger brother of Danny McCormack, bassist in the Wildhearts, another British rock band who had already achieved commercial success, and with whom 3 Colours Red would play some of their first concerts. Ben Harding had been a founder member of Senseless Things, whilst Vuckovic's stint with Diamond Head had galvanised his songwriting.

Fierce Panda Records released their first single, "This Is My Hollywood", published by Warner Chappell Music. The band then signed to Creation Records, after Alan McGee, Creation's founder and discoverer of Oasis, said that 3CR were "the second best band in Britain" (after Oasis).

== Creation Records period ==
While with Creation, the band recorded two albums. The first, Pure (1997) was produced by Terry Thomas. There was controversy over the resulting single "Sixty Mile Smile", the lyrical content of which referred to frontman Vučković's overnight hospitalisation after taking the drug ecstasy.

Revolt (1999) was produced by Dave Eringa. At the peak of their success, following the band's biggest hit (the Vuckovic-penned "Beautiful Day") they embarked upon US tours with Marilyn Manson, Aerosmith and Silverchair. However, the group disbanded after the Reading and Leeds Festivals in 1999, citing musical and personal differences in a press release.

Vuckovic was signed to Sony Records and Sanctuary Management and spent two years writing an album for his new project Elevation, which was never released. McCormack joined Rich Battersby and EMF producer Ralph Jezzard for a stint in Grand Theft Audio, who spent considerable time touring America before being dropped.

== Reformation ==
In 2002, Vuckovic and McCormack reconciled their differences and reformed the band with original drummer Keith Baxter. Ben Harding had by this time forged a career in public relations and was replaced by Paul Grant (ex-Pornstar).

The new line-up signed to Mighty Atom Records and Sanctuary Management and recorded The Union of Souls album with producer Joe Gibb (Funeral for a Friend/ Million Dead) in 2004, to critical acclaim but little commercial success. "Repeat To Fade" and "The World is Yours", taken from the album, were released as singles and the band toured Europe and Japan with German bands Die Toten Hosen and The Donots as well as a handful of UK tours and festival slots including the first Download festival.

In mid 2005, a double album, If You Ain't Got a Weapon..., made up of the band's singles and b-sides from the Creation period was released by Sanctuary Records, with accompanying sleeve notes penned by Vuckovic. A live DVD recorded at the Islington Academy in 2004 was also released, followed by a live album, Nuclear Holiday from the same show. The band split again in September 2005 after a UK farewell tour with The Yo-Yos, having been dropped by Sanctuary and disappointing sales of the third album, and continuing personal differences between Vuckovic and McCormack.

== Band members ==
- Pete Vuckovic (lead vocals, bass)
- Chris McCormack (guitar, vocals)
- Ben Harding (guitar, vocals, 1996–1999)
- Paul Grant (guitar, vocals, 2002–2005)
- Keith Baxter (drums)

As a youngster, Vuckovic was a keen hard rock/heavy metal fan and played in bands with his older brother throughout his teens in his hometown of Tiverton in Devon. His first notable success came in 1993 after leaving his own band, Blackout, and moving to Birmingham to join reformed N.W.O.B.H.M./Heavy metal band Diamond Head as their bassist. He recorded on the 'Death and Progress' and 'Evil Live' albums but they split again soon after.

McCormack's first success was as a member of Newcastle upon Tyne heavy metal outfit Forgodsake, who released an album on Bleeding Heart Records before McCormack eventually left. He originally moved to London to join Honeycrack with Willie Dowling and CJ from the Wildhearts but ended up forming 3 Colours Red with Vuckovic instead. Afterwards, he joined electro rockers Grand Theft Audio with Rich Battersby from the Wildhearts, and spent several months touring the U.S. with them before they were eventually dropped by the record label, forcing them to return home. He also tours as the guitarist in Gary Numan's live band and co-wrote several songs with Adam Ant for Ant's 2013 album Adam Ant Is the Blueblack Hussar in Marrying the Gunner's Daughter.

Harding embarked upon a career in public and media relations following the first split of 3 Colours Red in 1999.

Grant went on to form Bassknives with Vuckovic, as well as joining CJ & the Satellites with CJ from the Wildhearts in 2006.

As a teenager, Baxter became a founder member of folk metal pioneers Skyclad, recording five seminal albums with them before leaving in 1995 to move to London and join 3 Colours Red. Following the split of the band in 1999 he formed the band Elevation with Vuckovic. The pair signed with Sony but were dropped a year later. He moved back to his hometown of Lancaster and briefly played with the Northern Irish band Therapy? in 2002.

Baxter went on to play with the Lancaster-based band Baby Judas, but died on 4 January 2008 at the age of 36, from a gastrointestinal haemorrhage.

== Discography ==
=== Studio albums ===
Year	Album details	Peak chart positions
Year	Album details	UK
1997	Pure: Released: 1997; Label: Creation; Formats: CD, Cassette, LP	16
1999	Revolt: Released: 1999; Label: Creation; Formats: CD, Cassette, LP	17
2004	The Union of Souls: Released: 2004; Label: Mighty Atom; Formats: CD, Cassette, LP	188

=== Compilation albums ===
Title	Album details
If You Ain't Got a Weapon...	Released: 2005; Label: Sanctuary; Formats: CD

=== Live albums ===
Title	Album details
Nuclear Holiday	Released: 2005; Label: Snapper; Formats: CD

=== Singles and EPs ===
Year	Title	Peak chart positions	Album
Year	Title	UK	Album
1996	"This Is My Hollywood"	162	Pure
1997	"Nuclear Holiday"	22	Pure
1997	"Sixty Mile Smile"	20	Pure
1997	"Pure"	28	Pure
1997	"Copper Girl"	30	Pure
1997	"This Is My Hollywood" (re-release)	48	Pure
1998	Paralyse EP (Non-eligible for UK Chart)	—	
1999	"Beautiful Day"	11	Revolt
1999	"This Is My Time"	36	Revolt
2003	"Repeat To Fade"	97	The Union of Souls
2004	"The World Is Yours"	—	The Union of Souls

In the United States, "Beautiful Day" charted on the Radio and Records Alternative chart, peaking at No. 40 in April 1999.

== DVDs ==
- Live at the Islington Academy (Secret 2005)
