= Old Rope =

Compilation album by Skyclad
- Released: 1996
- Recorded: Various
- Genre: Folk metal
- Length: 73:51
- Label: Noise Records
- Producer: Kevin Ridley

Skyclad chronology
Tracks from the Wilderness (1992)	Old Rope (1996)	History Lessens (2001)

Old Rope is a compilation album by British folk metal band Skyclad, composed of tracks from the band's first five albums.

AllMusic rated the album four and a half stars and noted, "Old Rope constitutes an ideal first glimpse at the bizarre treasures of the band's first five records."

== Track listing ==
1. "The Widdershins Jig"
2. "Skyclad"
3. "Spinning Jenny"
4. "Alone in Death's Shadow"
5. "Thinking Allowed?"
6. "The Wickedest Man in the World"
7. "Earth Mother, the Sun and the Furious Host"
8. "Cardboard City"
9. "Land of the Rising Slum"
10. "The One Piece Puzzle"
11. "Just What Nobody Wanted"
12. "Brothers Beneath the Skin"
13. "The Present Imperfect"
14. "The Cradle Will Fall"
15. "The Declaration of Indifference"
16. "Ring Stone Round"
17. "Men of Straw"
