= Oui Avant-Garde á Chance =

Oui Avant-garde á Chance

Studio album by Skyclad
- Released: 1996
- Genre: Folk metal
- Length: 53:46
- Label: Massacre Records
- Producer: Kevin Ridley

Skyclad chronology
Irrational Anthems (1996)	Oui Avant-garde á Chance (1996)	The Answer Machine? (1997)

Professional ratings
Review scores
Source	Rating
Allmusic	4/5 stars

Oui Avant-garde á Chance is the seventh full-length album British folk metal band, Skyclad. It contains 8 original tracks, 2 remixes and 2 covers: "Come On Eileen" (originally by Dexys Midnight Runners) and "Master Race" (originally by New Model Army).

As on the previous album, the group remained a quartet, with Steve Ramsey overdubbing all guitars, and with the hiring of Paul Smith and Paul A.T. Kinson as session drummers. Moreover, Les Smith has been involved as an accordion player in three songs.

Eric Fish, Frau Schmitt and Bodenski from the German folk metal group Subway to Sally have a guest appearance on the track "Come On Eileen".

For the first time in band history, Kevin Ridley contributed vocals for a Skyclad record, before taking over lead vocal duties in 2001. He sings the second voice in "If I Die Laughing, It'll Be an Act of God".

The apparently nonsensical French album title is a homophonic translation of the English phrase 'We haven't got a chance'.

== Track listing ==
1. "If I Die Laughing, It'll Be an Act of God" – 3:48
2. "Great Blow for a Day Job" – 4:19
3. "Constance Eternal" – 5:52
4. "Postcard from Planet Earth" – 5:10
5. "Jumping My Shadow" – 5:26
6. "Bombjour!" – 4:02
7. "History Lessens (The Final Examination)" – 4:20
8. "A Badtime Story" – 5:35
9. "Come on Eileen" – 3:54
10. "Master Race" – 4:06
11. "Bombed Out (Instru-mental)" – 4:05
12. "Penny Dreadful" (Full Shilling Mix) – 3:09

== Personnel ==
- Martin Walkyier – vocals
- Steve Ramsey – lead, rhythm and acoustic guitars
- Graeme English – electric bass, classical guitar
- Georgina Biddle – violin, fiddle, keyboards

Additional musicians

- Paul Smith – drums (tracks 3, 6–8, 10–12)
- Paul Atkinson – drums (tracks 1, 2, 4, 5, 9)
- Les Smith - accordion (tracks 2, 9, 12)
- Eric Hecht - bagpipes and penny whistle (track 2), backing vocals (track 9)
- Frau Schmitt - additional violin (track 9)
- Bodenski - backing vocals (track 9)
