= Radiator (disambiguation) =

A radiator is any of several types of heat exchangers designed to transfer thermal energy from one medium to another for the purpose of cooling or heating.

Radiator can also refer to:

- Radiator (heating), the conventional heating of a building
- Radiator (engine cooling)
- Electric radiator, a ubiquitous household heating appliance
- Radiator (antenna), an electrical antenna
- Black body, an object with perfect radiation absorption and emission
- Information radiator, a display of information posted on a wall where passers-by can see it, typically used in software development
- Radiator (album), a 1997 album by the Super Furry Animals
- Radiator (band), or their self-titled 1999 album
- Radiator (film), a 2014 film

== See also ==
- The Radiators (disambiguation)
