= A Burnt Offering for the Bone Idol =

Studio album by Skyclad
- Released: 8 April 1992
- Genre: Folk metal, heavy metal, thrash metal
- Length: 44:16
- Label: Noise
- Producer: Kevin Ridley

Skyclad chronology
The Wayward Sons of Mother Earth (1991)	A Burnt Offering for the Bone Idol (1992)	Jonah's Ark (1993)

Professional ratings
Review scores
Source	Rating
AllMusic	4.5/5 stars

A Burnt Offering for the Bone Idol is the second album by British folk metal band Skyclad, released in 1992.

== Track listing ==
Source: Metal Archives All music by Steve Ramsey, All lyrics by Martin Walkyier.

The samples in War and Disorder have been compiled by Kevin Ridley.

No.	Title	Length
1.	"War and Disorder"	1:44
2.	"A Broken Promised Land"	5:13
3.	"Spinning Jenny"	2:48
4.	"Salt on the Earth (Another Man's Poison)"	4:50
5.	"Karmageddon (The Suffering Silence)"	6:02
6.	"Ring Stone Round"	2:10
7.	"Men of Straw"	4:32
8.	"R'vannith"	6:05
9.	"The Declaration of Indifference"	4:12
10.	"Alone in Death's Shadow"	6:40

== Personnel ==
Skyclad

- Martin Walkyier – vocals
- Steve Ramsey – lead, rhythm and acoustic guitars
- Graeme English – electric bass, classical guitar
- Dave Pugh – lead guitar
- Keith Baxter – drums, percussion
- Fritha Jenkins – violin, keyboards
