= Revolt (3 Colours Red album) =

Studio album by 3 Colours Red
- Released: 8 February 1999
- Genre: Hard rock, punk rock, indie rock
- Length: 43:44
- Label: Creation
- Producer: Dave Eringa, John Smith

3 Colours Red chronology
| Pure (1997) | Revolt (1999) | The Union of Souls (2004) |

Singles from Revolt
- 1. "Beautiful Day" Released: 11 January 1999; 2. "This Is My Time" Released: 17 May 1999

Revolt is the second album from UK rock band 3 Colours Red. It was recorded with producer Dave Eringa (Manic Street Preachers), and the band adopted a more polished and commercial sound. The album reached number 17 on the UK album chart when it was released on Creation Records in 1999, but the band split at their peak after releasing only 2 singles from it, both of which entered the UK top 40. An additional EP, Paralyse, was released before the album.

== Background and recording ==
3 Colours Red released their debut studio album Pure in May 1997, which peaked at number 16 on the UK Albums Chart. Four of its five singles reached the top 40 of the UK Singles Chart, with "Sixty Mile Smile" peaking the highest at number 20. Revolt was predominantly produced by Dave Eringa, save for "Calling to the Outside", which was produced by John Smith. Chris Sheldon mixed the recordings at The Church.

== Composition and lyrics ==
Musically, the album's sound has been described as rock, continuing the sound of their debut. The Independent's Tim Perry said the album's "blend of punk, grunge and a touch of hardcore seems to have been made with the tastes of American rock radio in mind". In The Rough Guide to Rock, writer Alex Ogg said "continued their intriguing blend of metal-tinted guitar fire, punkish brevity, angry attack and thoughtful lyrics". The album's opening track "Paralyse", as well as "Paranoid People", evokes the early material of Faith No More; John Street of The Times referred to it as a "Lennonesque chant, endlessly repeating its slogan like a demonstration circling a roundabout". "Intermission" was reminiscent of the sound of Jesus Jones and the stadium rock of U2, and is followed by the punk rock track "Song on the Radio". "Beautiful Day" is a power ballad centered around strings, compared to Simon Le Bon. The soft rock "This Is My Time" is followed by "Be Myself", which recalls the work of the Alarm.

== Release ==
The Paralyse EP was released on 26 October 1998, consisting of "Paralyse", "Throwing the World Away", "Say Something" and "Room with a View". On 21 November 1998, Revolt was announced for release in three months. "Beautiful Day" was released as the album's lead single on 11 January 1999; the seven-inch vinyl version included an acoustic demo of "Beautiful Day". Two versions were released on CD: the first with "God Shape Hole" and "A Fine Time for It", while the second featured "I Want You" and a remix of "Paralyse" done by Junkie XL. Revolt was released on 8 February 1999 through Creation Records; the cover artwork features Andy Warhol-lite shots of electric pylons, attempting to evoke the paranoia found in the artwork of Radiohead's OK Computer (1997).

Revolt was promoted with a UK tour that ran into the following month. Alongside this, the band held signing sessions at record shops around the country. In March and April 1999, they embarked on a three-week tour of the United States, some dates of which saw them support Silverchair. They headlined the Radio 1 Even Session tour in May 1999, with support from Muse and the Donnas. "This Is My Time" was released as the album's second single on 17 May 1999; the seven-inch vinyl version included a "Paranoid People" demo. Two versions were released on CD: the first with "All the Fun of the Unfair" and "IF", while the second featured "WWW.Sad" and "Everything". On 21 July 1999, 3 Colours Red announced they were breaking up amidst creative differences; they played their final performances at the Reading and Leeds Festivals.

== Reception ==
Professional ratings
Review scores
| Source | Rating |
|---|---|
| AllMusic | 2.5/5 stars |
| The Independent | 3/5 |
| Richmond Times-Dispatch | 2/5 stars |
| Rock Hard | 7/10 |
| Select | 3/5 |

AllMusic reviewer Jason Damas wrote that the album was not a "very compelling listen", with the band lacking a "sense of humor or an individual personality" compared to other punk acts. He noted that most of the album "rattles on at breakneck speed without ever leaving much of an impression". Perry said the band's "energy and undoubted ear for a tune is twiddled about with too much in the seeming search for an arena-filling sound". Rock Hard writer Jan Jaedike noted that the band "matured a bit" with the new album, though this came at the cost of "freshness and a latent tendency towards static compositions is unmistakable". The Day's Rick Koster said the band "rocks a lot [...] and are quite capable of belting out memorable choruses over the sea of barre chords".

Chris Charles of BBC News thought the band "have opted - or have been instructed to - play it safe on the odd track or two". He added that when they "show their true colours, it is truly an experience to behold. But when they bow down to commercialism, the cracks begin to show". Richmond Times-Dispatch's John Piersol deemed it "mediocre," though some of the tracks "stand out as a little better than average. Not great, mind you, just better than average". The staff at Evening Standard remarked: "This is rock 'n' roll, kids, and it's loud and shouty and, erm, just a teensy bit boring. 3 Colours Red can't make up their minds whether they want to be garage raw, or ballad pretty". Select writer John Mullen, the band's "rage is too formulaic to reach the very concrete terrors of the Manics' 'Holy Bible'", adding that the song names "read like Weird Al-style Radiohead parodies".

Revolt peaked at number 17 on the UK Albums Chart; "Beautiful Day" charted at number 11, and "This Is My Time" at 36, both on the UK Singles Chart.

== Track listing ==
All lyrics by Pete Vuckovic.

UK Version
| No. | Title | Music | Length |
|---|---|---|---|
| 1. | "Paralyse" | Chris McCormack | 3:19 |
| 2. | "Pirouette" | McCormack | 4:13 |
| 3. | "Beautiful Day" | Vuckovic | 4:18 |
| 4. | "Cancel the Exhibition" | McCormack | 3:43 |
| 5. | "Intermission" | Vuckovic | 4:25 |
| 6. | "Song on the Radio" | McCormack | 4:07 |
| 7. | "Paranoid People" | Vuckovic | 3:09 |
| 8. | "Back to the City" | McCormack | 4:01 |
| 9. | "This Is My Time" | Vuckovic | 3:45 |
| 10. | "Be Myself" | McCormack | 2:50 |
| 11. | "Calling to the Outside" | McCormack | 3:37 |
| 12. | "Age of Madness" | Vuckovic | 2:24 |

== Personnel ==
Personnel per booklet.

3 Colours Red

- Pete Vuckovic – vocals, bass
- Chris McCormack – guitar, vocals
- Ben Harding – guitar, vocals
- Keith Baxter – drums

Additional musicians

- Sally Herbert – violin (tracks 3 and 9)
- Anne Stephenson – violin (tracks 3 and 9)
- Gini Ball – viola (tracks 3 and 9)
- Claire Orster – viola (tracks 3 and 9)
- Jocelyn Pook – viola (tracks 3 and 9)
- Dinah Beamish – cello (tracks 3 and 9)
- Dave Bishop – saxophone (track 4)
- Dave Eringa – noises

Production and design

- Dave Eringa – producer (all except track 11)
- John Smith – producer (track 11)
- Chris Sheldon – mixing
- Sharon Elphick – front image
- Simon Corkin – design
- Antony Hooper – CD label shot
- Steve Gullick – back inlay image
