= Pure (3 Colours Red album) =

Studio album by 3 Colours Red
- Released: 12 May 1997
- Recorded: 1996
- Studios: Livingston Recording Studios, London
- Genres: Garage punk, punk rock, rock & roll
- Label: Creation
- Producer: Terry Thomas

3 Colours Red chronology
Pure (1997)	Revolt (1999)

Pure is the debut album by the UK rock band 3 Colours Red, released in 1997.

It was produced by the band's manager Terry Thomas at Livingston Recording Studios in London in 1996. It reached number 15 in the UK album charts when it was released on Creation Records in 1997 and included four top-40 singles, it was touted by the music press at the time as "one of the best British albums of the decade", catapulting the band into the mainstream media headlights. Having injected energy into the UK's dwindling Britpop scene alongside bands like A, Feeder, Bush, Idlewild, Symposium, Muse, Ash and Stereophonics they soon became poster boys for the industry's newly carved 'Britrock' pigeonhole.

== Reception ==
Professional ratings
Review scores
Source	Rating
The Guardian	2/5 stars
NME	7/10

The Observer writer Neil Spencer said "somewhere it's always 1977, and this quartet's debut is hewn straight from punk's frantic riffing and all-purpose pissed-offness. The bludgeoning approach works well enough, but is unlikely to muscle aside the competition". Andrew Smith of The Sunday Times thought the band sound liked a "genetically engineered cross between the Clash and one of the punk era's great unsung bands, the Ruts. Crucially, they do it pretty well, too: the gritty rush of the first half-dozen tracks [...] amount to a powerful reminder of why these sounds made such an impact 20 years ago". The Guardian concluded that "it's not that their verbose rants are unpleasant—on the contrary, they inspire fond memories of the Clash—but this sort of three-chord stuff feels deeply anachronistic."

== Track listing ==
1. "Pure" (Vuckovic) - 3:08
2. "This Is My Hollywood" (McCormack) - 2:43
3. "Nerve Gas" (McCormack) - 2:22
4. "Nuclear Holiday" (McCormack) - 3:06
5. "Copper Girl" (Vuckovic) - 3:32
6. "Sixty Mile Smile" (McCormack) - 2:39
7. "Sunny in England" (McCormack) - 2:37
8. "Alright Ma" (McCormack) - 3:01
9. "Mental Blocks" (McCormack) - 2:32
10. "Fit Boy + Faint Girl" (Vuckovic) - 4:28
11. "Halfway Up the Downs" (Vuckovic) - 2:26
12. "Hateslick" (McCormack) - 3:46
13. "Love's Cradle" (McCormack) - 2:51
14. "Aniseed" - (McCormack) 2:16

== Personnel ==
3 Colours Red

- Pete Vuckovic – vocals, bass
- Chris McCormack – guitar
- Ben Harding – guitar
- Keith Baxter – drums

Technical

- Terry Thomas – producer
- George Marino – mastering
