= Jig-a-Jig (EP) =

EP by Skyclad
- Released: 2006
- Genre: Folk metal
- Producer: Kevin Ridley

Skyclad chronology
Swords of a Thousand Men (2001)	Jig-a-Jig (2006)

Jig-a-Jig is British folk metal group Skyclad's third limited edition EP. It was made available through the band's website and at gigs only. This EP features Skyclad's cover version of "Jig-a-Jig" by East of Eden and three tracks from the A Semblance of Normality recording sessions, originally planned for a single in 2004/2005 that was never released.

The title of track #3, "They think it's all over", is a well known quotation popular in England. It is taken from Kenneth Wolstenholme's BBC TV commentary in the closing moments of the 1966 World Cup, where England beat West Germany 4-2 after extra time to win the FIFA World Cup. The song includes several references to the '66 World Cup.

Track 4 "The Roman Wall Blues" is a setting of the W. H. Auden poem of the same title.

== Track listing ==
1. Jig-a-Jig
2. Mr. Malaprope & Co
3. They Think It's All Over, (Well Is It Now?)
4. The Roman Wall Blues
