= The Wayward Sons of Mother Earth =

Studio album by Skyclad
- Released: 17 October 1991
- Recorded: Jacobs Studios, Surrey England
- Genre: Thrash metal, folk metal
- Length: 46:47
- Label: Noise
- Producer: Skyclad, Kevin Ridley

Skyclad chronology
The Wayward Sons of Mother Earth (1991)	A Burnt Offering for the Bone Idol (1992)

The Wayward Sons of Mother Earth is the debut album by British folk metal band Skyclad. Though still rooted in thrash, it is regarded as one of the first folk metal albums, with the track "The Widdershins Jig" in particular pointing the way for the genre. Front cover artwork is by Garry Sharpe-Young.

Professional ratings
Review scores
Source	Rating
AllMusic	3/5 stars
Metal Hammer	6/7

== Track listing ==
- All lyrics by Martin Walkyier. All music as noted under "Writer(s)".

No.	Title	Writer(s)	Length
1.	"The Sky Beneath My Feet"	Steve Ramsey	5:41
2.	"Trance Dance (A Dreamtime Walkabout)"	Ramsey, Graeme English	5:29
3.	"A Minute's Piece"	English	1:10
4.	"The Widdershins Jig"	Ramsey	3:40
5.	"Our Dying Island"	Ramsey	7:07
6.	"Intro: Pagan Man"	Ramsey	1:00
7.	"The Cradle Will Fall"	Ramsey	6:26
8.	"Skyclad"	Ramsey	5:01
9.	"Moongleam and Meadowsweet"	English	4:35
10.	"Terminus"	Ramsey	6:38

== Personnel ==
Skyclad

- Martin Walkyier – vocals
- Steve Ramsey – lead, rhythm and acoustic guitars
- Graeme English – electric bass, classical guitar
- Keith Baxter – drums, percussion

Additional musicians

- Joe "Guido" Caprani – voice on track 6
- Dominic Miller – classical guitar lead on track 9
- Mike Evans – fiddle
- Rog Patterson – keyboards, piccolo
