= Another Fine Mess (Skyclad album) =

Live album by Skyclad
- Released: 4 September 2001
- Genre: Folk metal
- Label: Demolition
- Producer: Kevin Ridley

Skyclad chronology
Another Fine Mess (2001)	Live at the Dynamo (2002)

Professional ratings
Review scores
Source	Rating
Metalitalia.it	6/10

Another Fine Mess is the first major live release by British folk metal band Skyclad. Tracks 1–8 are from the Dynamo festival in 1995, and 9–12 are acoustic reworkings of old Skyclad songs which first appeared on the limited edition Outrageous Fourtunes EP.

== Track listing ==
1. "Intro" (Live)
2. "Another Fine Mess" (Live)
3. "Cardboard City" (Live)
4. "Art-Nazi" (Live)
5. "The Wickedest Man in the World" (Live)
6. "The One Piece Puzzle" (Live)
7. "Still Spinning Shrapnel" (Live)
8. "Just What Nobody Wanted" (Live)
9. "Sins of Emission" (acoustic)
10. "Land of the Rising Slum" (acoustic)
11. "Alone in Death's Shadow" (acoustic)
12. "Spinning Jenny" (acoustic)
