= Let the Four Winds Blow =

Studio album by Tenpole Tudor
- Released: 1981
- Recorded: October 1981
- Studio: Genetic Studios, Streatley, West Berkshire
- Genre: Punk rock, pub rock
- Label: Stiff; SEEZ 42
- Producer: Alan Winstanley

Tenpole Tudor chronology
Eddie, Old Bob, Dick and Gary (1980)	Let the Four Winds Blow (1981)	Made it this Far (2009)

Professional ratings
Review scores
Source	Rating
allmusic	3/5 stars

Let the Four Winds Blow is the second album by Tenpole Tudor and the follow-up to Eddie, Old Bob, Dick and Gary. Despite featuring the minor hit "Throwing My Baby Out With the Bath Water" (#49 in November 1981) the album and the follow-up single (the title track "Let the Four Winds Blow") both failed to chart. It would be 27 years before the next album, Made it this Far would be released.

== Track listing ==
=== 1981 LP (SEEZ 42) ===
1. "Let the Four Winds Blow" (Tudorpole) - 3:28
2. "Throwing My Baby Out With the Bathwater" (Tudorpole, Kingston, Long) - 3:31
3. "Trumpeters" (Tudorpole) - 4:11
4. "It's Easy to See" (Tudorpole, Kingston, Long) - 3:48
5. "What You Doing in Bombay" (Tudorpole, Kingston, Long, Crippen) - 4:03
6. "Local Animal" (Tudorpole, Kingston, Long, Crippen, Universe) - 4:04
7. "Her Fruit is Forbidden" (Tudorpole, Kingston) - 2:57
8. "Tonight is the Night" (Tudorpole, Long) - 3:44
9. "The Unpaid Debt" (Tudorpole, Crippen) - 3:18
10. "The King of Siam" (Tudorpole, Crippen, Long) - 3:56

=== 1993 CD reissue (STIFFCD 12) ===
1. "Let the Four Winds Blow" - 3:28
2. "Throwing My Baby Out With the Bathwater" - 3:31
3. "Trumpeters" - 4:11
4. "It's Easy to See" - 3:48
5. "What You Doing in Bombay" - 4:03
6. "Local Animal" - 4:04
7. "Her Fruit is Forbidden" - 2:57
8. "Tonight is the Night" - 3:44
9. "The Unpaid Debt" - 3:18
10. "The King of Siam" - 3:56
11. "Sea of Thunder" - 2:57
12. "Conga Tribe" - 4:01
13. "Tenpole 45" - 4:15
14. "Fashion" - 2:51
15. "Rock and Roll Music" - 2:23
- Although uncredited, both "Fashion" and "Rock and Roll Music" are live versions recorded at the Marquee.

=== 2007 CD reissue (CDSEEZ 31) ===
1. "Let the Four Winds Blow" - 3:28
2. "Throwing My Baby Out With the Bathwater" - 3:31
3. "Trumpeters" - 4:11
4. "It's Easy to See" - 3:48
5. "What You Doing in Bombay" - 4:03
6. "Local Animal" - 4:04
7. "Her Fruit is Forbidden" - 2:57
8. "Tonight is the Night" - 3:44
9. "The Unpaid Debt" - 3:18
10. "The King of Siam" - 3:56
11. "Conga Tribe" - 4:01
12. "Sea of Thunder" - 2:57
13. "Tied Up With Lou Cool" (The Tudors) - 3:24
14. "Cry Baby Cry" (The Tudors) - 3:50
15. "The Hayrick Song" (Eddie Tenpole Tudor) - 3:19
16. "Take You to the Dance" (Eddie Tenpole Tudor) - 3:21
17. "The Hayrick Song" (Extended Square Dance Version) (Eddie Tenpole Tudor) - 6:06

== Personnel ==
Tenpole Tudor

- Dick Crippen – bass, vocals, producer
- Bob Kingston – guitar, piano, vocals
- Gary Long – percussion, drums, vocals
- Eddie Tudorpole – guitar, piano, saxophone, vocals
- Munch Universe – guitar, percussion, vocals

Technical

- Alan Winstanley – producer
- David M. Allen - engineer
- Kim Aldis - photography
