= Eddie, Old Bob, Dick and Gary =

Studio album by Tenpole Tudor
- Released: 17 April 1981
- Studios: Workhouse Studios, Old Kent Road, London; Basing Street, London
- Genres: Punk rock, new wave
- Label: Stiff SEEZ 31
- Producers: Bob Andrews, Dick Crippen, Alan Winstanley

Tenpole Tudor chronology
Eddie, Old Bob, Dick and Gary (1981)	Let the Four Winds Blow (1981)

Singles from Eddie, Old Bob, Dick and Gary
- 1. "Three Bells in a Row" Released: 1981; 2. "Wünderbar" Released: 1981; 3. "Swords of a Thousand Men" Released: 1981

Eddie, Old Bob, Dick and Gary is the debut studio album by English punk rock band Tenpole Tudor. The title is a play on the phrase "any old Tom, Dick or Harry". A moderately successful seller, peaking at No. 44 on the UK Albums Chart, the album launched three singles: "Three Bells in a Row", "Wünderbar" and "Swords of a Thousand Men". "Wünderbar" rose to No. 16 on the UK Singles Chart. "Swords of a Thousand Men" was the most successful of Tenpole Tudor's singles, reaching No. 6 and remaining on the charts for 12 weeks. The album was reissued on CD in 2007 on the See label.

== Critical reception ==
Professional ratings
Review scores
Source	Rating
AllMusic	4.5/5 stars

Ira Robbins of Trouser Press lauded the band's single releases as "classy trash", noting that on the better tracks of the album, Tenpole Tudor's "good humor and rock energy are undeniably infectious". AllMusic, expressing surprise at the album's number of "flat-out excellent songs", judges the album as "a thrillingly primitive rock & roll record".

== Track listing ==
Unless otherwise indicated, all songs by Eddie Tudorpole.

=== 1980 LP (SEEZ 31) ===
1. "Swords of a Thousand Men"
2. "Go Wilder" (Dick Crippen, Bob Kingston, Tudorpole)
3. "I Wish"
4. "Header Now" (Gary Long, Tudorpole)
5. "There are Boys"
6. "Wünderbar"
7. "3 Bells in a Row" (Crippen, Kingston, Long, Tudorpole)
8. "Tell Me More"
9. "Judy Annual" (Long, Tudorpole)
10. "I Can't Sleep" (Kingston, Long, Tudorpole)
11. "Anticipation"
12. "What Else Can I Do"
13. "Confessions"

=== 1991 CD reissue (REP 4220-WY) ===
1. "Swords of a Thousand Men" - 2:57
2. "Go Wilder" - 2:37
3. "I Wish" - 3:27
4. "Header Now" - 2:44
5. "There are Boys" - 4:35
6. "Wunderbar" - 3:00
7. "3 Bells in a Row" - 3:02
8. "Tell Me More" - 3:09
9. "Judy Annual" - 2:32
10. "I Can't Sleep" - 2:08
11. "What Else Can I Do" - 2:21
12. "Confessions" - 3:50
13. "Fashion" (Live at the Marquee) - 2:44
14. "Rock and Roll Music" (Live at the Marquee) - 2:10
15. "Love and Food" - 2:47
16. "Wunderbar" (Hit Single Version) - 3:00
17. "Tenpole 45" - 4:09
18. "There Are Boys" (Son of Stiff Version) - 4:35

=== 1993 CD reissue (STIFFCD 06) ===
1. "Swords of a Thousand Men" - 2:57
2. "Go Wilder" - 2:37
3. "I Wish" - 3:27
4. "Header Now" - 2:44
5. "There are Boys" - 4:35
6. "Wunderbar" - 3:00
7. "3 Bells in a Row" - 3:02
8. "Tell Me More" - 3:09
9. "Judy Annual" - 2:32
10. "I Can't Sleep" - 2:08
11. "Anticipation" - 2:00
12. "What Else Can I Do" - 2:21
13. "Confessions" - 3:50
14. "Love and Food" - 2:47
15. "There Are Boys" (Son Of Stiff Version) - 4:35
16. "Wunderbar" (Hit Single Version) - 3:00
- "There are Boys" is mistitled as "There are the Boys" on both the 1991 and 1993 CD reissues.

=== 2007 CD reissue (CDSEEZ 31) ===
1. "Swords of a Thousand Men" - 2:57
2. "Go Wilder" - 2:37
3. "I Wish" - 3:27
4. "Header Now" - 2:44
5. "There are Boys" - 4:35
6. "Wunderbar" - 3:00
7. "3 Bells in a Row" - 3:02
8. "Tell Me More" - 3:09
9. "Judy Annual" - 2:32
10. "I Can't Sleep" - 2:08
11. "Anticipation" - 2:01
12. "What Else Can I Do" - 2:21
13. "Confessions" - 3:50
14. "3 Bells in a Row" (Original Single Version) - 3:02
15. "Fashion" (Live at the Marquee) - 2:44
16. "Rock and Roll Music" (Live at the Marquee) - 2:10
17. "Love and Food" - 2:47
18. "Wunderbar" (Hit Single Version) - 3:00
19. "Tenpole 45" - 4:09
20. "There Are Boys" (Son Of Stiff Version) - 4:35
21. "Wunderbar" (Live from London University - Son of Stiff Tour) - 2:49
22. "Real Fun" (Live from London University - Son of Stiff Tour) - 2:43
23. "Go Wilder" (Live from London University - Son of Stiff Tour) - 2:18

== Personnel ==
Tenpole Tudor

- Dick Crippen (Richard Coppen) – bass, vocals, producer
- Bob Kingston – guitar, vocals
- Gary Long – percussion, drums, vocals
- Eddie Tudorpole – guitar, saxophone, vocals

with:

- Munch Universe – guitar, vocals

Technical

- Bob Andrews – producer
- Alan Winstanley – producer, engineer
- Edwin Cross, Rik Walton, Simon Humphries - engineer
- Chris Gabrin - photography
