= A Fine Mess =

A Fine Mess may refer to:

== Film and television ==
- A Fine Mess (film), a 1986 comedy by Blake Edwards
- "A Fine Mess" (Beverly Hills, 90210), an episode of Beverly Hills, 90210
- "A Fine Mess" (Code Lyoko), an episode of Code Lyoko
- A Fine Mess, a film and television production company founded by Ed Naha

== Music ==
- A Fine Mess (album), by Kate Voegele, 2009
- A Fine Mess (EP), by Interpol, 2019
- A Fine Mess, an album by David Baerwald, 1999
- "A Fine Mess", a song by The Temptations from To Be Continued...
- "A Fine Mess (You've Gotten Us Into)", a song by Trooper from Thick as Thieves

== Other uses ==
- A Fine Mess, a series of collected comics by Matt Madden
- A Fine Mess: A Global Quest for a Simpler, Fairer, and More Efficient Tax System, a 2017 book by T.R. Reid

== See also ==
- Another Fine Mess (disambiguation)
