= Nuclear Holiday =

Live album by 3 Colours Red
- Released: 2005
- Recorded: 2004
- Genres: Hard rock, punk rock, indie
- Label: Snapper

3 Colours Red chronology
If You Ain't Got a Weapon... (2005)	Nuclear Holiday (2005)

Nuclear Holiday is a live album by UK rock band 3 Colours Red.

It was recorded at the Islington Academy in London, England, on 6 February 2004 for a live D.V.D. (Live at the Islington Academy) by Secret/Snapper Records. The audio was later released and titled Nuclear Holiday.

== Track listing ==
1. Repeat To Fade
2. This Is My Hollywood
3. Paranoid People
4. Pure
5. Fit Boy And Faint Girl
6. Mental Blocks
7. World Is Yours
8. Sunny in England
9. Copper Girl
10. Nerve Gas
11. God Shaped Hole
12. Sixty Mile Smile
13. Hateslick
14. Paralyse
15. Beautiful Day
16. Nuclear Holiday

== Personnel ==
- Pete Vuckovic – vocals/bass
- Chris McCormack – guitar/vocals
- Paul Grant – guitar/vocals
- Keith Baxter – drums
