= Skyclad (band) =

English folk metal band

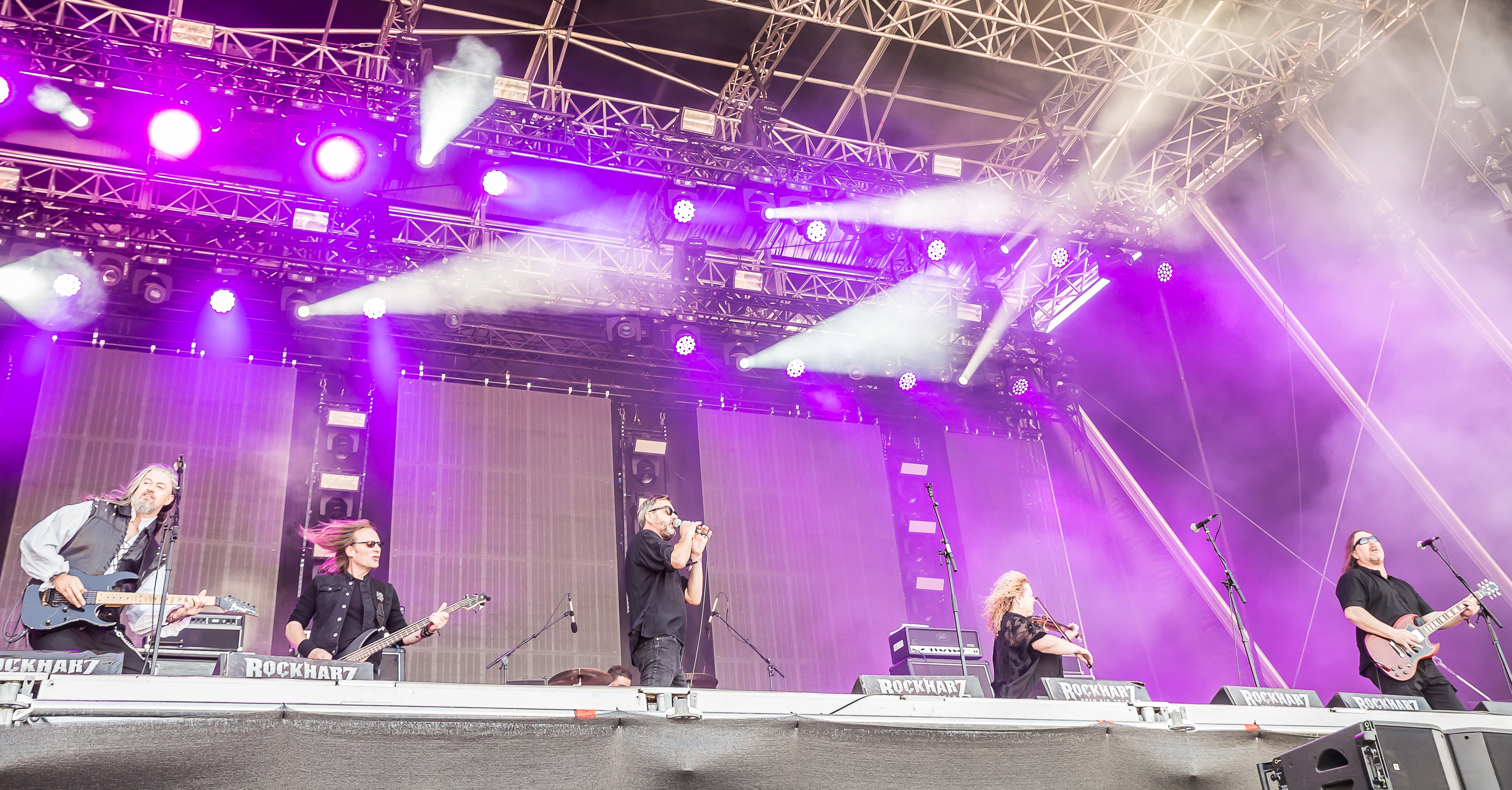
- Skyclad at Rockharz Open Air 2018

Background information
- Origin: Newcastle upon Tyne, England
- Genres: Folk metal; heavy metal; thrash metal
- Years active: 1990–present
- Labels: Demolition Records, Massacre, Noise, Nuclear Blast, Listenable, Burning Airlines
- Members: Steve Ramsey; Graeme "Bean" English; Georgina Biddle; Arron Walton; Al Batchelor

Skyclad is an English heavy metal band heavily influenced by folk. They are considered pioneers of folk metal. The term "skyclad" originates from a pagan/wiccan concept referring to ritual nudity, where rituals are performed with participants metaphorically clothed only by the sky, symbolising equality. The name reflects both the band's religious inclinations and their social beliefs, as expressed in the song "Skyclad" on their debut album.

== History ==
The band was founded in 1990 by former Sabbat vocalist Martin Walkyier and Satan/Pariah guitarist Steve Ramsey, following Walkyier's departure from Sabbat due to a disagreement with guitarist Andy Sneap regarding the band's musical direction. Their goal was to form the "ultimate pagan metal band," initially envisioning ideas like traditional Robin Hood costumes, though these concepts were soon abandoned. They completed the lineup with another ex-Pariah member, bassist Graeme English, and drummer Keith Baxter. The band signed with the German record label Noise International and released their debut album, The Wayward Sons of Mother Earth in 1991. The album cover was designed by Garry Sharpe-Young.

Following a tour with Overkill, they added Fritha Jenkins on violin and keyboards, along with a second guitarist, Dave Pugh, a friend of Baxter’s. This expanded lineup allowed for a more folk-influenced sound on their 1992 follow-up album, A Burnt Offering for the Bone Idol. Their early work continued with the release of Jonah's Ark in 1993. In 1994, the band released Prince of the Poverty Line, during which Cath Howell replaced Fritha Jenkins, who had left to have a baby. Howell had filled in during the Jonah's Ark tour, as Jenkins had initially planned to return but later decided not to, making Howell a permanent member.

Howell later resumed her studies and was replaced by Georgina Biddle for the 1995 album The Silent Whales of Lunar Sea. Afterward, both Baxter and Pugh left the band, leaving them short of members and generally unable to tour. However, they did replace Tiamat on the Black Sabbath Forbidden UK tour in 1995, while recording Irrational Anthems, which was released early the following year.

Oui Avant-Garde á Chance was recorded over the course of a year and, like Irrational Anthems, featured studio/session drummer Paul AT Kinson. The Answer Machine? followed in 1997 with Kinson on drums, but the band still lacked a permanent drummer. In 1998, Jay Graham and guitarist Kevin "Riddler the Fiddler" Ridley—who had previously served as the band's producer, background vocalist, and singer/guitarist in the punk band Forgodsake—joined the lineup, just in time to record Vintage Whine, released in 1999.

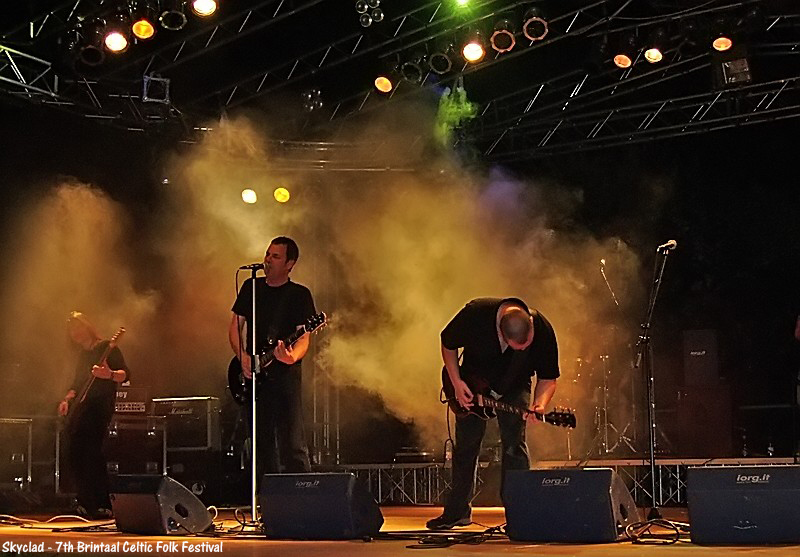
Skyclad performing in 2008

The lineup remained stable during the recording of 2000's Folkémon, but founding member Walkyier departed from the band in 2001, citing various reasons, including financial difficulties and the band's reluctance to tour in South America due to security concerns as the final straw. Other band members noted that Walkyier's somewhat acerbic personality contributed significantly to the group's lineup instability. After leaving, Walkyier went on to form The Clan Destined. For many fans, Walkyier's lyrics and delivery style were central attractions, leading to fears that his departure might spell the end for the band.

After replacing drummer Jay Graham—who left shortly after Walkyier—with drummer Arron Walton, and moving Kevin Ridley to vocals, the group aimed to alleviate these fears with 2002's No Daylights... Nor Heel Taps, which featured studio recordings of "Irish Pub versions" of Skyclad classics by the new lineup. This release was preceded by the single "Swords of a Thousand Men" in 2001. The single's title track, originally recorded by Tenpole Tudor, also appeared on Folkémon as a bonus track, albeit in a different version. The single included two recordings of the title track: one featuring Ridley on vocals and another with Ridley sharing vocals with Tenpole Tudor's frontman Edward Tudor-Pole. The single and album releases were accompanied by The Same...But Different tour, the largest Skyclad had undertaken in many years. Additionally, in 2001, the band's former record label released Another Fine Mess, which included live recordings from 1995 and the contents of the Outrageous Fourtunes EP.

After some disagreements between Walkyier and the other band members regarding copyrights and royalties for his lyrics, as well as the release of tracks featuring him, 2004's A Semblance of Normality marked the band's first new material following Walkyier's departure. The album's style closely resembled that of previous releases, with Ridley's lyrics making a concerted effort to maintain similar themes and styles to Walkyier's while also establishing an individual identity.

In 2006, Skyclad self-released an EP titled Jig-a-Jig. A new album was planned for the same year, but Black Lotus Records went out of business just a few months after Skyclad had signed with them.

The band's twelfth studio album, In The... All Together, was released in spring 2009 via Scarlet Records.

In June 2012, Walkyier announced that a band called "Martin Walkyier's Skyclad" would be headlining a festival in Nottingham, England, in September of that year.

Skyclad's 13th studio album, Forward Into The Past, was released on 28 April 2017 via Listenable Records. This album is notable for being the first since 1995's Silent Whales of Lunar Sea to feature second guitarist Dave Pugh, who returned to Skyclad as a full member in 2014.

It was announced in May 2025, that Kevin Ridley had decided to leave the band to give more time to his family and his other project/band Theigns & Thralls. A follow-up announcement was made by the band that they had decided to continue as a five-piece, with the remaining line-up staying the same, with Dave Pugh handling the vocals.

In December 2025, the band announced that Pugh was taking a break of an unspecified length and nature, stating that he remained a "good friend" of the bad and might return later. His replacement was named as Al Batchelor.

== Band members ==
Skyclad at Rockharz Open Air, Germany, 2018

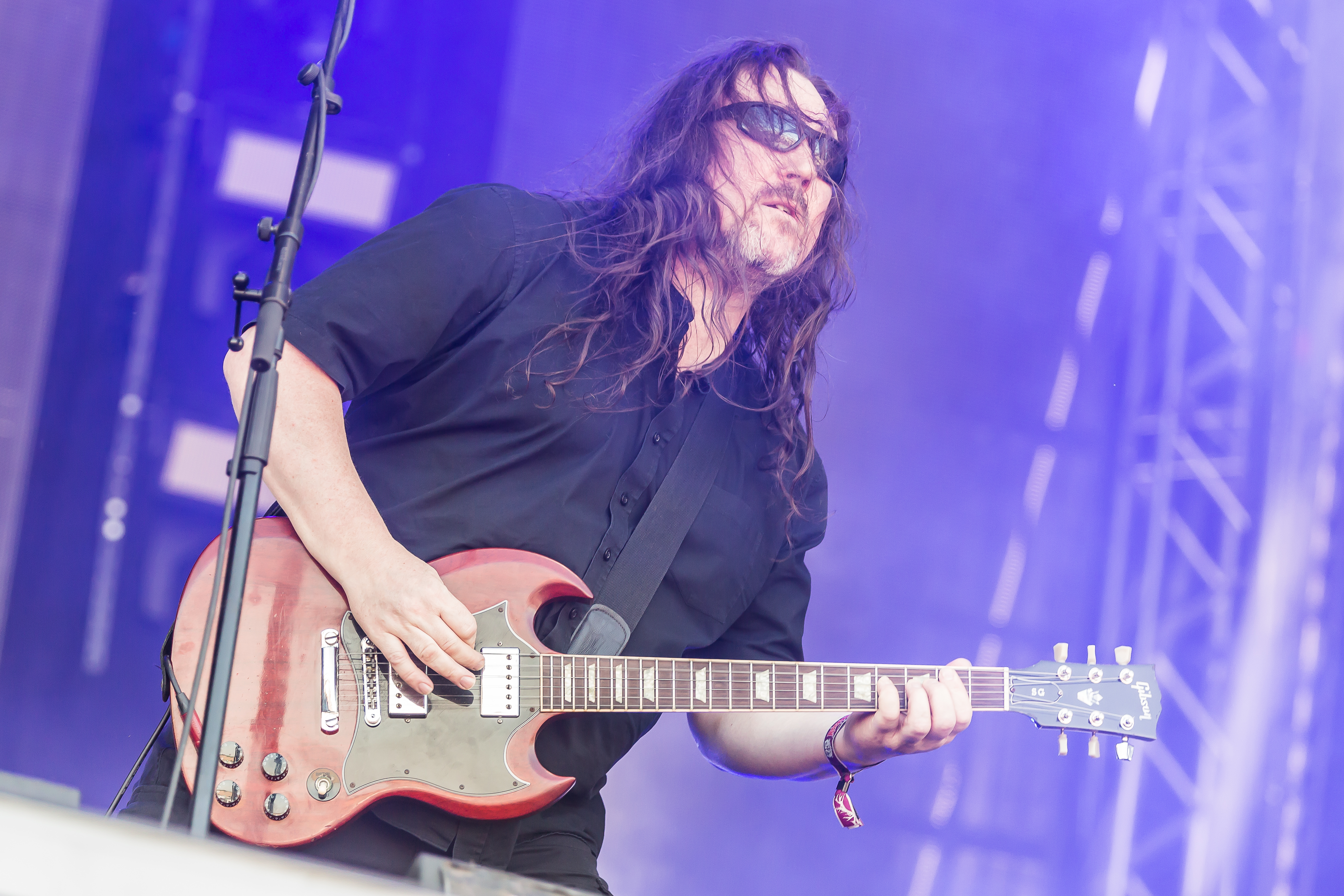
Steve Ramsey

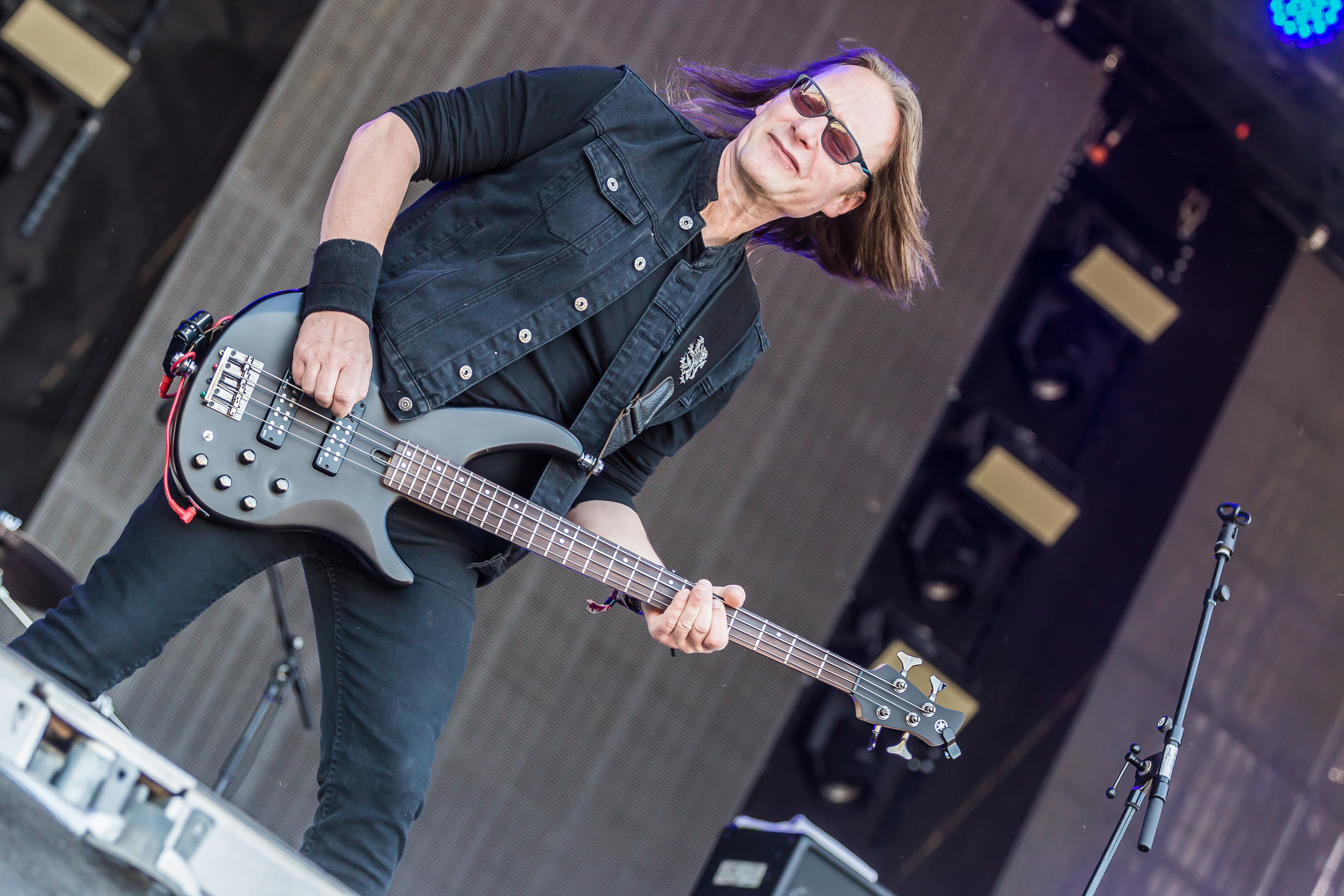
Graeme "Bean" English

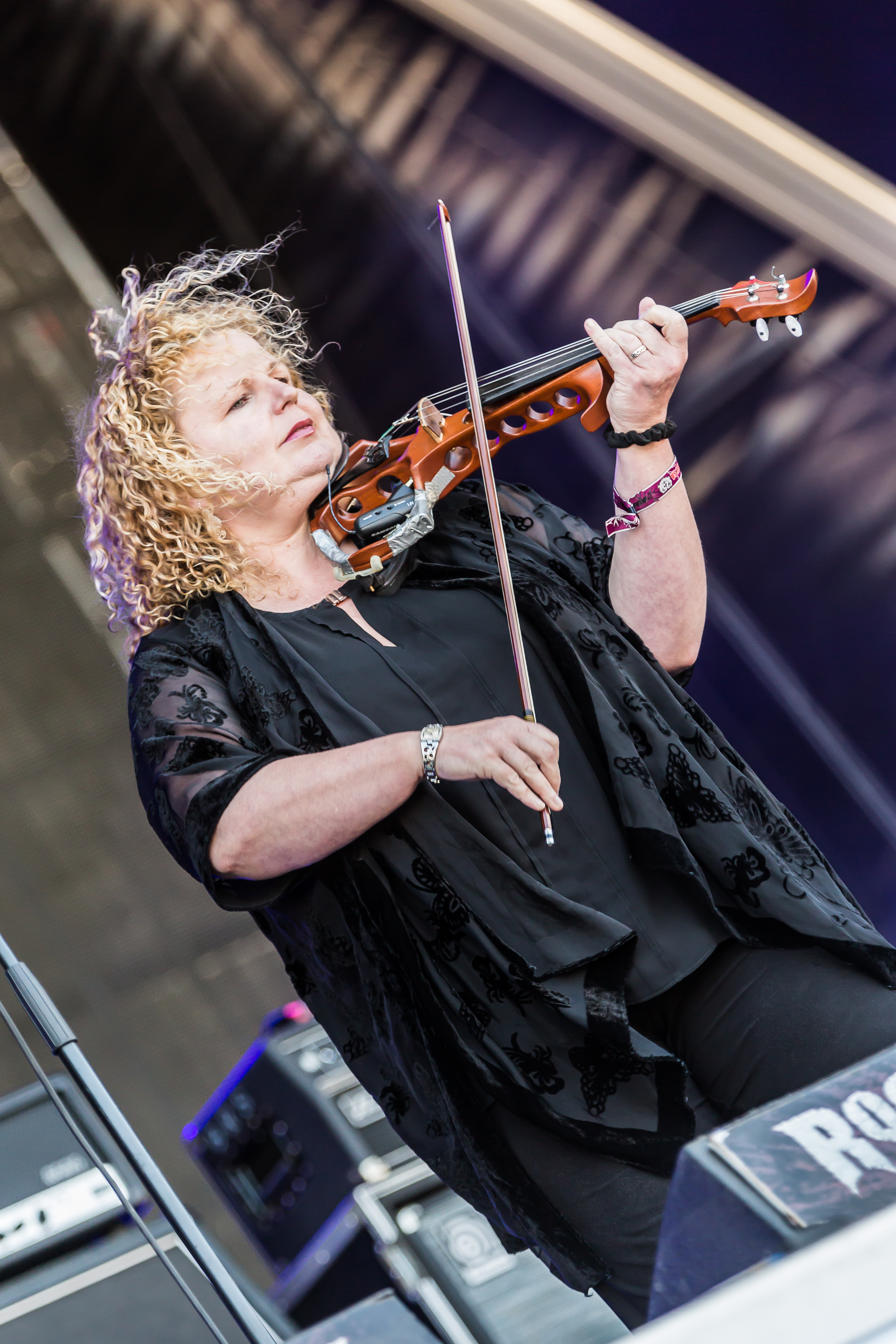
Georgina Biddle

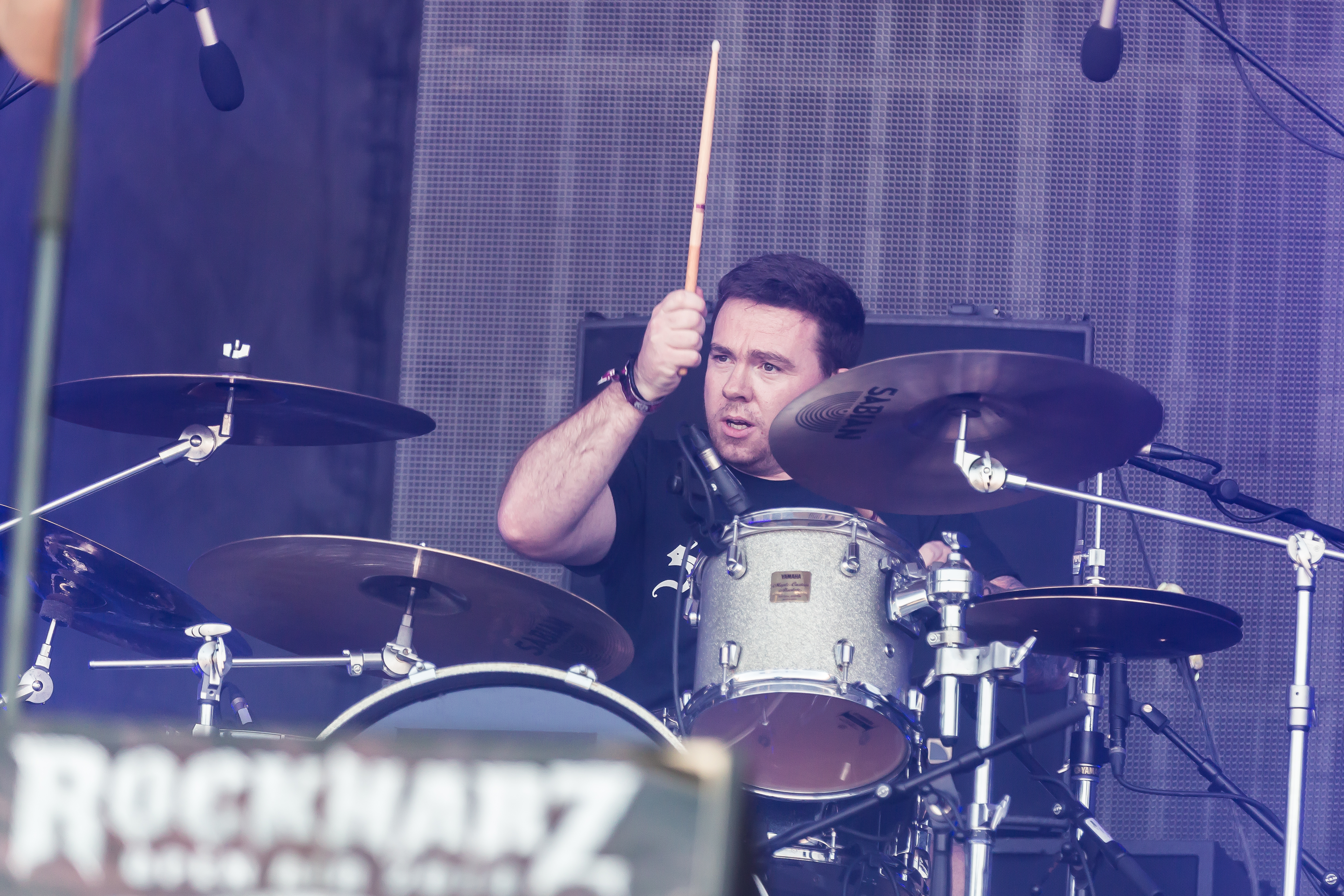
Arron Walton

=== Current ===
- Steve Ramsey – guitars (1990–present)
- Graeme "Bean" English – bass (1990–present)
- Georgina Biddle – violin, fiddle, keyboards (1995 - present)
- Arron Walton – drums (2001–present)
- Al Batchelor – vocals, guitars (2025–present)

=== Former ===
- Martin Walkyier – vocals (1990–2001)
- Dave Pugh – guitars (1992–1995, 2014–2025), vocals (2025)
- Kevin Ridley – guitars (1998–2025), vocals (2001–2025)
- Keith Baxter – drums (1990–1995; died 2008)
- Fritha Jenkins – violin, keyboards (1992–1993)
- Catherine Howell – violin, keyboards (1994)
- Paul A.T. Kinson – drums (1996–1997)
- Jay Graham – drums (1998–2001)

=== Live/session ===
- Danny Porter – guitar (1992)
- Dave Ray – guitar (1995)
- Jed Dawkins – drums (1995)
- Paul Smith – drums (1996)
- Dave Moore – guitar (1996)
- Nick Acons – guitar, violin (1997)
- Mitch Oldham – drums (1997)

== Discography ==
=== Studio albums ===
- The Wayward Sons of Mother Earth (1991)
- A Burnt Offering for the Bone Idol (1992)
- Jonah's Ark (1993)
- Prince of the Poverty Line (1994)
- The Silent Whales of Lunar Sea (1995)
- Irrational Anthems (1996)
- Oui Avant-Garde á Chance (1996)
- The Answer Machine? (1997)
- Vintage Whine (1999)
- Folkémon (2000)
- A Semblance of Normality (2004)
- In the... All Together (2009)
- Forward into the Past (2017)

=== Compilations and live albums ===
- Old Rope compilation (1996)
- Poetic Wisdom compilation (limited tour Greek edition) (2001)
- Another Fine Mess live album (2001)
- Live at the Dynamo compilation/live album (2002)
- History Lessens compilation (2002)
- No Daylights... Nor Heel Taps compilation/re-recording (2002)

=== Singles and EPs ===
- Tracks from the Wilderness EP (1992)
- "Thinking Allowed?" (1993) UK No. 135
- Outrageous Fourtunes limited edition EP (1998)
- Classix Shape limited edition EP (1999)
- "Swords of a Thousand Men" (2001)
- Jig-a-Jig limited edition EP (2006)

=== Videos ===
- "Emerald" (1992)
- "Thinking Allowed?" (1993)
- "Inequality Street" (1996)
- "Words Upon the Street" directed by Fernando J. Martínez (2009)
- "Change Is Coming" directed by Fernando J. Martínez (2017)
- "Starstruck?" directed by Fernando J. Martínez (2017)
- "Words Fail Me" directed by Fernando J. Martínez (2018)
