= The Union of Souls =

Studio album by 3 Colours Red
- Released: 5 July 2004
- Genre: Hard rock, punk rock, indie
- Label: Mighty Atom
- Producer: Joe Gibb, Chris Sheldon

3 Colours Red chronology
Revolt (1999)	The Union of Souls (2004)	If You Ain't Got a Weapon... (2005)

The Union of Souls is the third and final studio album by UK rock band 3 Colours Red. It was released on Mighty Atom Records in 2004. The album was released on Mighty Atom Records in 2004 to critical acclaim but little commercial success. "Repeat to Fade" and "The World is Yours" were released as singles, the latter only as a download.

Eight of the ten tracks were recorded at the old BBC studios in Swansea, Wales, with Joe Gibb (Funeral for a Friend). The other two ("Repeat to Fade" and "F.C.K.U") were recorded in London with Chris Sheldon (Foo Fighters/Therapy?).

== Track listing ==
1. "The Union of Souls" (Vuckovic)
2. "Repeat to Fade" (McCormack, Vuckovic)
3. "The World Is Yours" (Vuckovic)
4. "Desensitise" (McCormack, Vuckovic)
5. "Counterfeit Jesus" (Vuckovic)
6. "Ceasefire" (Vuckovic)
7. "Made in Indonesia" (McCormack, Vuckovic)
8. "Land of Debris" (McCormack, Vuckovic)
9. "F.C.K.U" (Vuckovic)
10. "Lullaby" (McCormack, Vuckovic)

== Personnel ==
3 Colours Red

- Pete Vuckovic - vocals, bass
- Chris McCormack - guitar
- Paul Grant - guitar
- Keith Baxter - drums

with:

- Jason Perry - vocals
- Martin McCarrick - vocals
- Alwyn Davies - vocals

Technical

- Joe Gibb - producer
- Chris Sheldon - producer
- Howie Weinberg - mastering
