= Live at the Dynamo =

Compilation album by Skyclad
- Released: 2002
- Genre: Folk metal
- Length: 52:31
- Label: Burning Airlines
- Producer: Kevin Ridley

Skyclad chronology
Another Fine Mess (2001)	Live at the Dynamo (2002)

Live at the Dynamo is the second major live release by British folk metal band Skyclad. It contains some of the same tracks as Another Fine Mess but was distributed in a different market.

Exclaim! noted in its review of the album, "This is for collectors and diehards only."

== Track listing ==
1. "Intro" – 1:57
2. "Another Fine Mess" – 4:37
3. "Cardboard City" – 4:40
4. "Art Nazi" – 3:50
5. "The Wickedest Man in the World" – 3:57
6. "The One Piece Puzzle" – 6:01
7. "Still Spinning Shrapnel" – 4:28
8. "Just What Nobody Wanted" – 5:29
9. "The Widdershins Jig" – 3:35
10. "The Declaration of Indifference" – 4:01
11. "The Cradle Will Fall" – 6:46
12. "Spinning Jenny" – 3:08
