= The Radiators =

The Radiators may refer to:

- The Radiators (American band), rock band from New Orleans, Louisiana (1978–2011)
  - The Radiators (album), their 2001 album
- The Radiators (Australian band), rock band from Sydney, Australia (1978–present)
- The Radiators from Space, Irish punk rock band (1976–1981, 2004–present), also known as The Radiators

== See also ==
- Radiator (disambiguation)
