= Chris McCormack (guitarist) =

English rock guitarist (born 1973)

Chris McCormack (born 1973 in South Shields, England) is an English rock guitarist, best known as the guitarist and co-founder of 1990s rock band, 3 Colours Red and the organiser of Camden Rocks Festival.

The younger brother of Danny McCormack of the Wildhearts, Chris McCormack first found success playing guitar for Newcastle-upon-Tyne heavy metal outfit Forgodsake, who released an album on Bleeding Heart Records before McCormack eventually left.

He originally moved to London to join Honeycrack with CJ from the Wildhearts but ended up forming 3 Colours Red with ex- Diamond Head bassist Pete Vuckovic instead. They went on to record two UK top 40 albums and six UK top 40 singles before splitting at their peak in 1999. He soon joined electro rockers Grand Theft Audio with Rich Battersby from the Wildhearts, and spent several months touring the US with them. 3 Colours Red reformed in 2002 and released a third album but split again in 2005.

He has also toured as the guitarist in Gary Numan's live band, and the reformed Professionals, with former Sex Pistols drummer Paul Cook.

Since 2009 he has run Camden Rocks Festival; a music festival in Camden Town, London showcasing both new and established artists across twenty venues in just one day. The festival headliners have featured the likes of The Cribbs, Bullet For My Valentine, The Subways, PiL, Feeder and Frank Turner. McCormack also organises regular Camden Rocks shows in Camden Town for upcoming bands.

== Discography ==
=== EPs ===
- Paralyse E.P - 3 Colours Red (Creation, 1998)

=== Albums ===
- Blasthead - Forgodsake (Bleeding Heart, 1994)
- Pure - 3 Colours Red (Creation, 1997)
- Revolt - 3 Colours Red (Creation, 1999)
- Blame Everyone - Grand Theft Audio (Sire, 2000)
- The Union of Souls - 3 Colours Red (Mighty Atom, 2004)
- If You Ain't Got a Weapon... (compilation) - 3 Colours Red (Sanctuary, 2005)
- Nuclear Holiday (live) - 3 Colours Red (Snapper, 2005)
