= Thee Faction =

British socialist garage punk band from Surrey, England

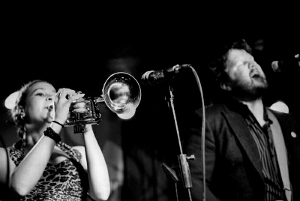
- Red Scare (left), Babyface (right)

Background information
- Origin: Surrey, England
- Genres: Garage punk, punk, garage rock
- Years active: 2010–present
- Label: Soviet Beret
- Members: Billy Brentford Nylons; Babyface; Dai Nasty; Kassandra Krossing; Thee Citizen; Red Scare; Nineteen Nineteen; The Ol' One Hand
- Past members: The G.A. Horace Hardman; Christine Campbell
- Website: theefaction.org

Thee Faction are a British garage rock/garage punk band from Surrey, England, noted for their explicit socialist agenda. They refer to their music, which incorporates elements of garage rock, pop and rhythm and blues as "Socialist RnB". Their album Up The Workers! was rated one of the Daily Mirror's top twenty albums of 2011.

== Biography ==
Thee Faction's debut album At Ebbw Vale was released in 2010. Dubbed 'rhythm and booze' and 'timely' by Simon Price in The Independent it was rated 8/10 in Vive Le Rock. Is This Music? praised the record, comparing the band to Dr. Feelgood.

Their second album Up The Workers! or, Capitalism is Good For Corporations That's Why You've Been Told Socialism is Bad All Your Life was described by the Daily Mirror as "Power-packed garage rock 'n' soul underlined by a defiantly political edge." The title track featured Ivan Chandler (The Echoes) on piano. The album was rated 7/10 by Drowned in Sound who praised it as "a lot of fun, undeniably stirring. Thee Faction write showstoppers" but also criticised the music as "entertaining in a very conventional way".

The band's third album Singing Down The Government, or, The War of Position and How We're Winning It, was released in 2012, and introduced all-female horn section Brass Kapital. The album was promoted by headlining appearances at the Marxism Festival and Tolpuddle Martyrs festival and included contributions by Richard Archer from Hard-Fi and rapper Clencha. Free download-only singles for tracks 'Soapbox' and 'Sausage Machine' were accompanied by promotional videos. Q Magazine praised the album as "a critique of societal hegemony on the back of a grimy blues'n’b twang, rife with the contagious energy of people who know they're right", and it was rated 7/10 by Mick Farren in Classic Rock Blues magazine.

Thee Faction released fourth album Good Politics: Your Role As An Active Citizen Within Civil Society in 2013, preceded by single 'Better Than Wages', remixed from the album by Andy Lewis. The album featured (on one track each) guest vocals from writer Francis Wheen and saxophone from Crayola Lectern, and was rated 8/10 in Classic Rock and 4/5 in The Independent and Mojo who called it "wildly galvanising, blisteringly angry, insanely entertaining blue-collar rock'n'roll".

Thee Faction released fifth album Reading Writing Revolution: The Tendency of the Rate of Profit to Fall in June 2015, preceded by a track on double-CD fundraising album Orgreave Justice and free download single "Choose Your Enemy", released on 29 March with accompanying video. A second free download single "(You've Got The) Numbers (Why Don't You Use It)" accompanied the release. The album received 5/5 in the Morning Star, 9/10 at MaximumVolumeMusic, and a positive review in Socialist Standard, while R*E*P*E*A*T zine called it "highly enjoyable, dangerously tuneful, subversively catchy and dialectically danceable, as well as being (as the title implies) properly educational - thought provoking and agitational." The band announced a number of summer festival dates, including Glastonbury, and a return to Tolpuddle and the Matchwomens Festival.

Thee Faction guitarist Babyface, under cadre name "Chris Fox", won the Beard Liberation Front's 'St David's Day Beard of Wales' title in 2015, 2017 and 2018. He was runner-up in 2016.

Thee Faction keyboard player and vocalist Kassandra Krossing, a.k.a. Cassie Fox, started the Loud Women organisation and festival in 2015. She also now plays bass in "mummycore" band I, Doris, along with Thee Faction trombonist Nineteen Nineteen.

Thee Faction's most recent gig to date was a 2017 benefit show for the anti-Haringey Development Vehicle campaign. The band has not officially confirmed a hiatus, although a slogan on one of their web-pages, "R&B sui generis", may indicate that, like other left-wing groups, they have gone into the Labour Party.

== Politics ==
The band have performed with, and for, various artists and organisations of the broad Left including Attila the Stockbroker, Robb Johnson, Chris T-T, Grace Petrie, Colour Me Wednesday, The Tuts, Billy Bragg, TV Smith, The Hurriers, Mark Steel, Josie Long, the SWP, the Welsh Communist Party and the Jeremy Corbyn Labour Party leadership campaign.

The band appear to be unaligned with any particular organisation or tradition but are noted for promoting ideas associated with guild socialism, democratic socialism, classical Marxism and left communism, while supporting a range of left-wing and trade union causes. Notwithstanding the band's use of Ostalgic tropes and apparent (possibly parodic) anti-revisionism, in a 2013 interview they declared themselves "libertarian socialists of one kind or another".

== Discography ==
=== Albums ===
- At Ebbw Vale LP/CD (Soviet Beret, 2010)
- Up the Workers! or, Capitalism Is Good for Corporations That's Why You've Been Told Socialism Is Bad All Your Life CD (Soviet Beret, 2011)
- Singing Down the Government, or, The War of Position and How We're Winning It CD (Soviet Beret, 2012)
- Good Politics: Your Role as an Active Citizen in Civil Society CD (Soviet Beret, 2013)
- Reading Writing Revolution: The Tendency of the Rate of Profit to Fall CD (Soviet Beret, 2015)

=== Singles/EPs ===
- Better Than Wages (remix) CD [promo single]
- Songs to Remind the Class of the Glorious Victory to Come and the Work That Must Be Done to Get There CD EP (Soviet Beret, 2013) [ft. Attila The Stockbroker and Judy Dyble]

=== Compilation appearances ===
- "Deft Left" on Now Hear This 103 (The Word) (CD) 2011
- "Relentless" (Judy Dyble with Thee Faction) on Judy Dyble - Gathering The Threads (3CD) 2015
- "Police State" on Orgreave Justice (2CD) 2015
- "Rent Strike" on Don't Be Left Without Us (2CD) 2016

== Members ==
Current members

- Billy Brentford – vocals (2010–present)
- Dai Nasty – drums (2010–present)
- Nylons – face-melting guitar (2010–present)
- Babyface – guitar, polemic (2010–present)
- Kassandra Krossing – vocals, organ of truth (2010–present)
- Thee Citizen – bass and superstructure (2012–present)
- Red Scare – trumpet (2011–present)
- Nineteen Nineteen – the 'bone of contention (2011–present)
- The Ol' One Hand – saxophone (2015–present)

Former members

- Horace Hardman – bass (2010–2011)
- The G.A. – saxophone (2011–2015)

Live members

- Bert 'iggins – Welsh harp
- Charley Marx – auxiliary guitar
- Jenny Marx – auxiliary drums
