= A Semblance of Normality =

Studio album by Skyclad
- Released: 21 June 2004
- Recorded: Damage Inc. Studio, Ventimiglia, Italy
- Genre: Folk metal
- Length: 47:19
- Label: Demolition Records
- Producer: Kevin Ridley

Skyclad chronology
No Daylights... Nor Heel Taps (2000)	A Semblance of Normality (2004)	In the... All Together (2009)

Professional ratings
Review scores
Source	Rating
Metal Hammer	6/7

A Semblance of Normality is the eleventh studio album by the British folk metal band Skyclad, released in the year 2004. It is the first "new" album the band recorded with Kevin Ridley as vocalist since this album's predecessor No Daylights... Nor Heel Taps.

With this album, Skyclad returned to a more heavy and experimental style, although their "classic hard rock" influences appear on this release. It can be compared to the band's mid-1990s albums.

Several tracks on this album feature 14 musicians of The Royal Philharmonic Orchestra.

== Track listing ==
No.	Title	Length
1.	"Intro (Pipes Solo)"	0:53
2.	"Do They Mean Us"	3:26
3.	"A Good Day to Bury Bad News"	4:42
4.	"Anotherdrinkingsong"	3:53
5.	"A Survival Campaign"	3:45
6.	"The Song of No-Involvement"	3:34
7.	"The Parliament of Fools"	3:10
8.	"Ten Little Kingdoms"	2:50
9.	"Like... A Ballad for the Disenchanted"	4:32
10.	"Lightening the Load"	4:54
11.	"NTRWB"	3:32
12.	"Hybrid Blues"	6:29
13.	"Outro (The Dissolution of Parliament)"	1:39

== Personnel ==
Skyclad

- Steve Ramsey – lead, rhythm and acoustic guitars
- Graeme English – electric bass, backing vocals
- Kevin Ridley – vocals lead guitar
- Arron Walton – drums, percussion
- Georgina Biddle – violin, fiddle, keyboards

Additional musicians

- Paul Smith – percussion
- Frankie Gibbon – hammond organ
- Andy May - northumbrian pipes, whistle
- The Royal Philharmonic Orchestra - Orchestration
