= The Answer Machine? =

Studio album by Skyclad
- Released: November 1997
- Genre: Folk metal
- Length: 53:42
- Label: Massacre Records
- Producer: Kevin Ridley

Skyclad chronology
Oui Avant-Garde á Chance (1996)	The Answer Machine? (1997)	Vintage Whine (1999)

Professional ratings
Review scores
Source	Rating
Metal Invader	5/6
MetalReviews	76/100
Rock Hard	8/10

The Answer Machine? is the eighth full-length album by British folk metal band Skyclad.

The album marks the peak of the folky sound from the group, with a bigger focus on traditional instruments and barely use of electric guitars.

This was also the group's last album as a quartet, with Steve Ramsey overdubbing all guitars, Paul A.T. Kinson as session drummer and with Mitch Oldham as session percussionist. Moreover, many guest musicians had been involved in this record, with Sasha Jankowic as narrator, Pete Coleman as flute-player (both on Troublesometimes), Yasmin Krull (sister of Alexander Krull from Atrocity) as female singer on The Thread of Evermore and with multi-instrumentalist John Leonard on pipes, whistles, accordion, banjo and additional vocals.

== Critical reception ==
Metal Invader called the album satisfying and recommended the tracks "Helium", "Troublesometimes", and "My Naked I". They said the band has found a style that suits Martin Walkyier's vocal capabilities. Rock Hard said that it's the band's most consistent folk/metal fusion yet. They concluded that extreme metal fans won't find much to like about the album, but everyone else should enjoy it. In a retrospective review, MetalReviews wrote: "Skyclad produced something special here that all too often is lost in the crowd when looking back over their discography."

== Track listing ==
No.	Title	Length
1.	"A Clown of Thorns"	1:36
2.	"Building a Ruin"	3:55
3.	"Worn Out Sole to Heel"	3:59
4.	"Single Phial"	6:07
5.	"Helium"	4:24
6.	"The Thread of Evermore"	6:55
7.	"Eirenarch"	4:00
8.	"Troublesometimes"	4:22
9.	"Isle of Jura"	3:59
10.	"Fainting by Numbers"	3:43
11.	"My Naked I"	3:46
12.	"Catherine at the Wheel"	3:44
13.	"Dead Angels on Ice"	3:12
