= Outrageous Fourtunes =

EP by Skyclad
- Released: 1998
- Genre: Folk metal
- Producer: Kevin Ridley

Skyclad chronology
| Thinking Allowed? (1993) | Outrageous Fourtunes (1998) | Classix Shape (1999) |

Outrageous Fourtunes is a limited edition acoustic EP by British folk metal band Skyclad. It was first released as a bonus CD for special edition copies of the band's album The Answer Machine?. Remaining copies were then sold at concerts and at select online retailers. A complete, low quality version of the EP was made available free on the Internet, with the band's blessing.

== Track listing ==
1. "Land of the Rising Slum" (Acoustic)
2. "Sins of Emission" (Acoustic)
3. "Alone in Death's Shadow" (Acoustic)
4. "Spinning Jenny" (Acoustic)
