= Prince of the Poverty Line =

Studio album by Skyclad
- Released: 22 March 1994
- Genre: Folk metal, heavy metal
- Length: 52:00
- Label: Noise
- Producer: Kevin Ridley

Skyclad chronology
Jonah's Ark (1993)	Prince of the Poverty Line (1994)	The Silent Whales of Lunar Sea (1995)

Professional ratings
Review scores
Source	Rating
AllMusic	4/5 stars
Metal Hammer	6/7

Prince of the Poverty Line is the fourth full-length studio album by British folk metal band Skyclad. It is a loose concept album about urban decay in post-Thatcherite Britain.

According to Kevin Ridley, producer and, from 1997, a full band-member, this album remains their biggest seller. Many people consider it to be the band's masterwork.

== Track listing ==
- All songs written by Ramsey/Walkyier except where noted.
1. "Civil War Dance" – 5:03
2. "Cardboard City" – 5:05
3. "Sins of Emission" – 3:33
4. "Land of the Rising Slum" – 4:28
5. "The One Piece Puzzle" – 5:52
6. "A Bellyful of Emptiness" – 4:57
7. "A Dog in the Manger" – 6:10
8. "Gammadion Seed" – 5:26
9. "Womb of the Worm" – 6:56
10. "The Truth Famine" – 4:30
11. "Brothers Beneath the Skin" (Limited edition bonus track) – 3:45

The US edition of the album contains the studio tracks from the Skyclad EP Tracks from the Wilderness as alternate bonus tracks, including the Thin Lizzy cover, "Emerald":

11. "Emerald" – 3:34 (Gorham/Downey/Robertson/Lynott)
12. "A Room Next Door" – 4:51
13. "When All Else Fails" – 4:19

== Personnel ==
- Martin Walkyier – lead vocals
- Steve Ramsey – six and twelve String Guitars, Backing Vocals
- Dave Pugh – electric and acoustic guitars
- Cath Howell – keyboards, violin, backing vocals
- Graeme English – bass, backing vocals
- Keith Baxter – drums
- With Tony Bray, Steve Chahley, Graig Dodds, Mark Dodds, Alex Martin – additional backing vocals

== Production ==
- Produced by Kevin Ridley and Skyclad
- Engineered and mixed by Kevin Ridley
