= Swords of a Thousand Men =

1981 single by Tenpole Tudor

Single by Tenpole Tudor

from the album Eddie, Old Bob, Dick and Gary
- A-side: "Swords of a Thousand Men"
- B-side: "Love and Food"
- Released: 27 March 1981
- Genre: Punk rock, psychobilly
- Length: 2:58
- Label: Stiff
- Songwriter: Edward Tudor-Pole
- Producers: Alan Winstanley, Bob Andrews

Tenpole Tudor singles chronology
"3 Bells in a Row" (1980)	"Swords of a Thousand Men" (1981)	"Wünderbar" (1981)

"Swords of a Thousand Men" is a song and single written by Eddie Tenpole, and performed by the English punk band Tenpole Tudor. It was first released on Stiff Records in March 1981. It entered the UK Singles Chart in April that year, reaching number 6 and staying for 10 weeks on the chart. On 1 June 1981, the single was awarded a silver certification by the BPI in the UK for sales of over 250,000 units.

According to Ed Tudor Pole, he worked up the fundamentals of the song on a Stiff Records package tour, writing in the tour bus toilet due to it being "near-impossible to write songs on the road because you lack the basic solitude". He has described the song's melody as a boogie-blues progression, influenced by Norman Greenbaum's "Spirit in the Sky" and Canned Heat's "On the Road Again". The lyrics were added after returning home from the tour: the song's opening line, "Deep in the castle and back from the war", was a nod to the band's favourite pub, the Castle on Holloway Road. Bassist Dick Crippen has said that the galloping horses in the song's intro were sampled from a sound effects album in the BBC library, whilst he played trumpet in addition to bass and drummer Gary Long added timpani.

== Charts ==
Chart (1981)	Peak position
Australia (Kent Music Report)	48
United Kingdom (Official Charts Company)	6

== Skyclad version ==
"Swords of a Thousand Men"

Single by Skyclad

from the album Folkémon
- A-side: "Sword of a Thousand Men"
- Released: 2001
- Genre: Folk metal
- Length: 8:55
- Label: Demolition Records
- Songwriter: Eddie Tenpole
- Producer: Kevin Ridley

In 2001, British folk metal group Skyclad released the song as their second true single (after 1993's "Thinking Allowed"). It featured two versions of Skyclad's cover of the song, one with Tenpole Tudor, plus a re-recorded version of one of their earliest tracks.
