= Vintage Whine =

Studio album by Skyclad
- Released: April 1999
- Genre: Folk metal, thrash metal, heavy metal
- Length: 43:49
- Label: Massacre Records
- Producer: Kevin Ridley

Skyclad chronology
The Answer Machine? (1997)	Vintage Whine (1999)	Folkémon (2000)

Professional ratings
Review scores
Source	Rating
Metal.de	8/10
Metalitalia.it	8.5/10
Rock Hard	8.5/10
Soundi	4/5

Vintage Whine is the ninth full-length album by British folk metal band Skyclad.

== Critical reception ==
Vampster said the album is clearly superior to their previous album but not as good as their debut. Metal.de highlighted the tracks "The Silvercloud's Dark Lining," "Cancer of the Heart," and "Something to Cling To" as earworms. Rock Hard said the album is a return to the band's metal roots, opposed to the more folk sound of the previous two records. Soundi said the "arrangements are very well thought out and skillfully made."

== Track listing ==
No.	Title	Length
1.	"Kiss My Sweet Brass" (Instrumental)	0:31
2.	"Vintage Whine"	4:26
3.	"On with Their Heads!"	4:51
4.	"The Silver Cloud's Dark Lining"	3:21
5.	"A Well Beside the River"	5:42
6.	"No Strings Attached"	4:53
7.	"Bury Me"	4:37
8.	"Cancer of the Heart"	5:27
9.	"Little Miss Take"	3:15
10.	"Something to Cling To"	5:00
11.	"By George" (Instrumental)	1:46
