= Tracks from the Wilderness =

EP by Skyclad
- Released: 1992
- Genre: Folk metal
- Length: 25:14
- Label: Noise Records
- Producer: Kevin Ridley

Skyclad chronology
Tracks from the Wilderness (1992)	Thinking Allowed? (1993)

Tracks from the Wilderness is an EP by British folk metal band Skyclad. It contains two new tracks, three live tracks and a cover of "Emerald" by Thin Lizzy. The live tracks were recorded at the Dynamo Festival in Eindhoven during June 1992.

== Track listing ==
1. "Emerald" – 3:35
2. "A Room Next Door" – 4:52
3. "When All Else Fails" – 4:20
4. "The Declaration of Indifference" (Live) – 3:59
5. "Spinning Jenny" (Live) – 3:02
6. "Skyclad" (Live) – 5:26

== Personnel ==
Skyclad

- Martin Walkyier – vocals
- Steve Ramsey – lead, rhythm and acoustic guitars
- Graeme English – electric bass, classical guitar
- Dave Pugh – lead guitar
- Kevin Ridley – lead guitar
- Keith Baxter – drums, percussion
- Fritha Jenkins – violin, keyboards
