= Tenpole Tudor =

English punk band

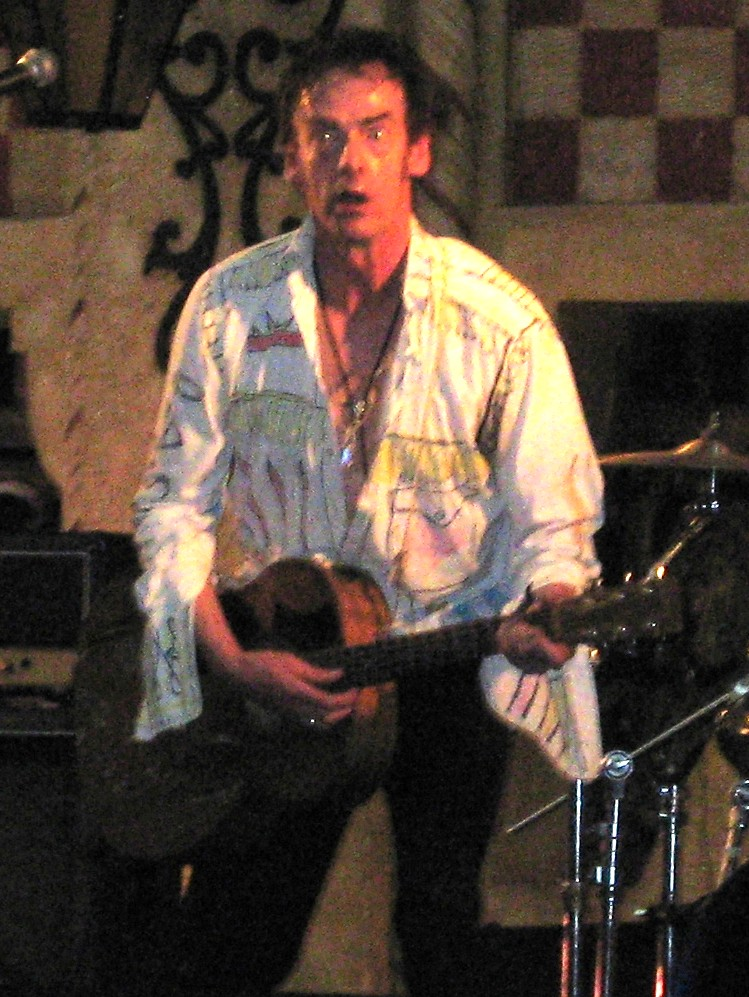
- Tudor-Pole in 2008

Background information
- Origin: England
- Genres: Punk rock, new wave
- Years active: 1977–present
- Labels: Stiff; Recall; Voices of Wonder
- Members: Edward Tudor-Pole; Rita Kae; Elin Krstiansen; Tony Rudseter; Thomas Hoegda; Tony Karlsen; Daniel Norum; Morten Anders Gaard; Inger Marie Buseth
- Past members: "Old" Bob Kingston; Dick Crippen; Gary Long; Munch Universe

Tenpole Tudor are an English punk band fronted by Edward Tudor-Pole. The band first came to prominence when Tudor-Pole appeared in the Sex Pistols' film The Great Rock 'n' Roll Swindle and on three of the singles released from the soundtrack. The band then went on to have hits in their own right with songs like "Swords of a Thousand Men" and "Wünderbar". The band has been active intermittently since 1977.

== Origins ==
Tenpole Tudor formed in 1977 when Tudor-Pole (vocals/saxophone) met guitarist "Old" Bob Kingston, bassist Dick Crippen, and drummer Gary Long. They played regularly for several years until Tudor-Pole himself (under the moniker of Eddie Tenpole) came to prominence by appearing in the 1980 film, The Great Rock 'n' Roll Swindle (filmed in 1978). He was originally billed as a replacement for Sex Pistols singer Johnny Rotten, performing the songs "Who Killed Bambi?", "The Great Rock 'n' Roll Swindle" and a cover version of "Rock Around the Clock" for the film and subsequent soundtrack. However, manager Malcolm McLaren and the remaining Sex Pistols instead decided to abandon the group and go their own ways.

== 1980-1999 ==
Tenpole Tudor recorded a single on WEA Records with the A-side being "Real Fun" and the B-side "What's in a Word". "Real Fun" is available in live form on two different CDs, but the single was never released on CD. Tenpole Tudor returned in 1980 and signed a recording contract with Stiff Records, with whom they released the single "3 Bells in a Row" (which is a slightly different version of the one later found on the album Eddie, Old Bob, Dick, and Gary) and was produced by Dick Crippen.

The band released their début album, Eddie, Old Bob, Dick and Gary, in 1981. It sold well, and in addition to the popular "3 Bells in a Row", launched two additional hit singles "Wünderbar" and "Swords of a Thousand Men". In the same year, the group released their second album, Let the Four Winds Blow, which also performed well. They further distinguished themselves with their oddball live performances, which had band members often dressing in medieval garb, and Tudor-Pole himself in a full suit of chain mail armour. They also added Munch Universe, as he was billed, to their line-up.

In 1982, the original Tenpole Tudor broke up. While Tudor-Pole led a cajun-inspired version of Tenpole Tudor, the rest of the band released a single under the name The Tudors, minus Munch Universe. After the non-original incarnation of Tenpole Tudor failed, Tudor-Pole left Stiff Records and began performing in jazz and swing bands, eventually returning to acting. Tudor-Pole formed a new line-up of the band in 1985, featuring Mick (guitar), Matt (bass), Sean (saxophone/guitar), and Paul (drums).

== 2000-present ==
Edward Tudor-Pole and Dick Crippen appeared onstage together for the first time in over 35 years in September 2016 in support of charities Rhythmix and Heads On.

== Discography ==
=== Tenpole Tudor ===
==== Albums ====
- Eddie, Old Bob, Dick and Gary (1981, Stiff Records, SEEZ 31) UK No. 44 - Re-released in Canada as Swords of a Thousand Men plus B-side
- Let the Four Winds Blow - (1981, Stiff Records, SEEZ 42)
- Made It This Far - (2009, Angel Air)
- 3 Bells in a Row - (2019, Voices of Wonder)

==== Singles ====
- "Who Killed Bambi?" - (1979, Virgin VS 256) - billed as Ten Pole Tudor - UK No. 6 - the listed a-side of "Who Killed Bambi" was "Silly Thing" by Sex Pistols
- "Rock Around the Clock" - (1979, Virgin VS 290) - UK No. 21 - the listed a-side of "Rock Around The Clock" was "The Great Rock 'n' Roll Swindle" by Sex Pistols
- "Real Fun" / "What's in a Word" - (1980, Korova - KOW 4)
- "3 Bells in a Row" / "Fashion" (Live at The Marquee) / "Rock and Roll Music" (Live at The Marquee) - (1980, Stiff Records, BUY 98)
- "Swords of a Thousand Men" / "Love and Food" - (1981, Stiff Records, BUY 109) UK No. 6
- "Wünderbar" / "Tenpole 45" - (1981, Stiff Records, BUY 120) - UK No. 16
- "Throwing My Baby Out with the Bath Water" / "Conga Tribe" - (1981, Stiff Records, BUY 129) - UK No. 49
- "Let the Four Winds Blow" / "Sea of Thunder" - (1981, Stiff Records, BUY 137)
- "Swords of a Thousand Men" (as featured in The Pirates! In an Adventure with Scientists!) - (2012, Stiff Records, BUY 285)

==== Compilations ====
- The Best of Tenpole Tudor: Swords of a Thousand Men - (2001, Metro, METRCD 049) - compilation of singles, b-sides and selected album tracks.
- Wunderbar: The Stiff Records Singles Collection - (2002, Anagram Records, CD PUNK 128) - compilation of all the singles and b-sides.

=== The Tudors ===
- "Tied Up with Lou Cool" / "Cry Baby Cry" - (1983, Stiff Records, BUY 172)

=== Eddie Tenpole Tudor ===
- "The Hayrick Song" / "Take You to the Dance" - (1983, Stiff Records, BUY 177 - 7" / SBUY 177 - 12")

=== CD reissues ===
- Eddie, Old Bob, Dick and Gary - (1991, Repertoire Records, REP 4220-WY) - the original album plus six bonus tracks.
- Eddie, Old Bob, Dick and Gary - (1993, Stiff Records, STIFFCD 06) - the original album plus three bonus tracks.
- Let the Four Winds Blow - (1993, Stiff Records, STIFFCD 12) - the original album plus five bonus tracks.
- Swords of a Thousand Men - (1997, Recall Records) - 2CD version of the 1993 reissues with different artwork.
- Eddie, Old Bob, Dick and Gary / Let The Four Winds Blow: The Stiff Anthology - (2007, Stiff Records, CDSEEZ 31) - Slipcased digitally remastered 2CD reissue of the original albums, with the single versions, b-sides and exclusive live tracks.
