= Jonah's Ark =

Studio album by Skyclad
- Released: 1993
- Genre: Folk metal, heavy metal
- Length: 39:46
- Label: Noise
- Producer: Kevin Ridley

Skyclad chronology
A Burnt Offering for the Bone Idol (1992)	Jonah's Ark (1993)	Prince of the Poverty Line (1994)

Jonah's Ark is the third studio album by British folk metal band Skyclad. The album was since reissued alongside the band's other earlier albums, resulting in positive feedback.

== Track listing ==
1. "Thinking Allowed?" (Music: Steve Ramsey, Dave Pugh/ Lyrics: Martin Walkyier) – 3:54
2. "Cry of the Land" (Music: Steve Ramsey/ Lyrics: Martin Walkyier) – 4:24
3. "Schadenfreude" (Music: Steve Ramsey/ Lyrics: Martin Walkyier) – 4:05
4. "A Near Life Experience" (Music: Steve Ramsey, Dave Pugh/ Lyrics: Martin Walkyier) – 3:16
5. "The Wickedest Man in the World" (Music: Graeme English/ Lyrics: Martin Walkyier) – 3:57
6. "Earth Mother, the Sun and the Furious Host" (Music: Steve Ramsey/ Lyrics: Martin Walkyier) – 3:16
7. "The Ilk of Human Blindness" (Music: Steve Ramsey/ Lyrics: Martin Walkyier) – 3:45
8. "Tunnel Visionaries" (Music: Dave Pugh/ Lyrics: Martin Walkyier) – 0:58
9. "A Word to the Wise" (Music: Steve Ramsey/ Lyrics: Martin Walkyier) – 6:13
10. "Bewilderbeast" (Music: Graeme English/ Lyrics: Martin Walkyier) – 2:37
11. "It Wasn't Meant to End This Way" (Music: Graeme English/ Lyrics: Martin Walkyier) – 3:21
