= Edward Tudor-Pole =

British musician and actor

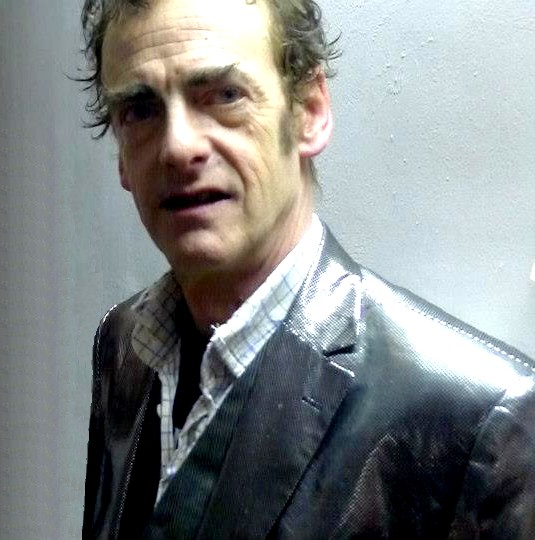
- Tudor-Pole in Cardiff, 2013
- Born: Edward Felix Tudor-Pole; 6 December 1954 (age 71); Lambeth, London, England
- Other name: Eddie "Tenpole"
- Occupations: Television presenter, actor, musician

Edward Felix Tudor-Pole (also known as Edward Tenpole; born 6 December 1954) is an English musician, television presenter and actor.

Originally gaining fame in the United Kingdom in the late 1970s as the lead singer of the punk rock band Tenpole Tudor, Tudor-Pole began an acting career following the group's split in 1982.

== Personal life ==
Tudor-Pole was born on 6 December 1954 in Lambeth, London, to David W. and Shirley C. (née Brown) Tudor-Pole. The family's name derives from that of John de la Pole, 2nd Duke of Suffolk (great-grandson of Geoffrey Chaucer), via Tudor-Pole's grandfather, spiritualist Wellesley Tudor Pole. Wellesley's mother was a descendant of Welsh courtier Owen Tudor, and added the 'Tudor' to her son's name.

Tudor-Pole grew up in Tonbridge, Kent, where he attended Hilden Grange School. After two terms boarding at Pennthorpe School in Rudgwick, Sussex, he moved to Yardley Court, where his mother taught, and at 13 went on to King Edward's School in Witley, Surrey. He later attended the Royal Academy of Dramatic Art. He lives in London and has one son. He was a keen motorcyclist for many years; his riding skills can be seen in the 1997 film Tunnel of Love, in which he played the lead role of Dodge. In 2025 he published his autobiography, The Pen is Mightier.

== Musical career ==
Tudor-Pole formed the band Tenpole Tudor in 1977, and eventually came to prominence after appearing in the film The Great Rock 'n' Roll Swindle as a possible replacement for Johnny Rotten in the Sex Pistols. He sang "Who Killed Bambi?", "The Great Rock 'n' Roll Swindle" and a cover version of "Rock Around the Clock" in the film and on the soundtrack. He also appeared in the 1986 film Sid and Nancy.

Tenpole Tudor made a comeback in 1980, signing to Stiff Records and releasing two successful albums, Eddie, Old Bob, Dick and Gary and Let the Four Winds Blow. They had three hit singles, including the Top 10 hit "Swords of a Thousand Men", which he performed on Top of the Pops in May 1981.

== Acting career ==
Tudor-Pole has appeared in numerous films and plays, and was the presenter on The Crystal Maze, replacing Richard O'Brien from 1993 until the show's hiatus in 1995. In 1994 he appeared in the BBC adaptation of Terence Rattigans The Deep Blue Sea as Jackie Jackson).(He appeared in Between the Lines in 1992, playing a Liverpudlian villain. His film and play credits include The Rocky Horror Show (written by his Crystal Maze predecessor), Jim Cartwright's play Road at the Royal Court Theatre, The Great Rock 'n' Roll Swindle (1980), Absolute Beginners (1986), Drowning by Numbers (1988), White Hunter Black Heart (1990) with Clint Eastwood, Princess Caraboo (1994), and several films by Alex Cox including Sid and Nancy (1986), Straight to Hell (1987) and Walker (1987).

In Kull the Conqueror (1997) he played Enaros, the antagonist of the film. The following year he appeared as a slumlord in the film version of Les Misérables, and as a blind man in Russell Mulcahy's horror film Tale of the Mummy. He also was seen in Quills (2000), The Life and Death of Peter Sellers (2004) as Spike Milligan, The Queen's Sister (2005), and in Oliver Twist (2007) as Mr Slipsby. Most recently he had a small part in an episode of Agatha Christie's Marple entitled "A Pocket Full of Rye", shown in 2009. His appearance in Harry Potter and the Chamber of Secrets (2002) as Mr Borgin, the owner of Borgin and Burke's store, was cut from the theatrical release, but is included in the extended edition DVD. He also appeared as a ranting street preacher in season two of Game of Thrones.

== Filmography ==
=== Film ===
Year	Title	Role	Notes
1980	The Great Rock 'n' Roll Swindle	Tadpole	
1986	Absolute Beginners	Ed the Ted	
1986	Sid and Nancy	UK Hotelier	
1987	Straight to Hell	Rusty Zimmerman	
1987	Walker	Doubleday	
1988	Drowning by Numbers	Mr 71 Van Dyke	
1990	White Hunter Black Heart	Reissar, British partner	
1994	Princess Caraboo	Lord Neville	
1994	Blackout	Brother Francis	
1996	Different for Girls	Prosecuting Solicitor	
1996	La lengua asesina	Flash	
1997	Kull the Conqueror	Enaros	
1997	Tunnel of Love	Dodge	
1998	Tale of the Mummy	Blind Man	
1998	The Young Person's Guide to Becoming A Rock Star	Christian	
1998	Les Misérables	Landlord	
2000	Some Voices	Lighter Seller	
2000	Quills	Franval	
2002	Harry Potter and the Chamber of Secrets	Mr Borgin	Deleted scenes
2004	The Life and Death of Peter Sellers	Spike Milligan	
2005	GamerZ	Dr Denham	
2005	The Queen's Sister	Cecil Beaton	TV movie
2008	Faintheart	Lollipop Man / Death Metal Singer	
2010	Straight to Hell Returns	Rusty Zimmerman	
TBA	Schadenfreude	The Landlord	

=== Television ===
Year	Title	Role	Notes
1993–1995	The Crystal Maze	Presenter	28 episodes
1994	Performance	Jackie Jackson	performance of The Deep Blue Sea
2012	Game of Thrones	Protestor	Ghost of Harrenhal
