= The Silent Whales of Lunar Sea =

Studio album by Skyclad
- Released: 1995
- Genres: Folk metal, heavy metal
- Length: 50:50
- Label: Noise Records
- Producers: Kevin Ridley & Skyclad

Skyclad chronology
Prince of the Poverty Line (1994)	The Silent Whales of Lunar Sea (1995)	Irrational Anthems (1996)

Professional ratings
Review scores
Source	Rating
AllMusic	4/5 stars

The Silent Whales of Lunar Sea is the fifth full-length studio album by British folk metal band Skyclad. Its title is a homophonic pun: when said aloud in a non-rhotic accent (such as British or Australian accents) it sounds identical to "The Silent Wails of Lunacy". The album was since reissued alongside the band's first four albums, resulting in positive feedback.

== Track listing ==
1. "Still Spinning Shrapnel" – 4:34
2. "Just What Nobody Wanted" – 4:48
3. "Art-Nazi" – 3:42
4. "Jeopardy" – 4:20
5. "Brimstone Ballet" – 4:13
6. "A Stranger in the Garden" – 5:27
7. "Another Fine Mess" – 6:15
8. "Turncoat Rebellion" – 2:06
9. "Halo of Flies" – 5:23
10. "Desperanto" (A Song for Europe?) – 3:29
11. "The Present Imperfect" – 4:04
12. "Dance of the Dandy Hound" – 2:29

Track 12 is only included on some versions

== Personnel ==
- Martin Walkyier – lead vocals
- Steve Ramsey - lead, rhythm and acoustic guitars, keyboards
- Dave Pugh – acoustic and electric guitars, banjo, backing vocals
- Graeme English – bass, classical guitar, keyboards, backing vocals
- Georgina Biddle – fiddle, keyboards, backing vocals
- Keith Baxter – drums, percussion

== Production ==
- Produced by Kevin Ridley and Skyclad
- Assistant engineer – Rob Pemberton
- Mastering – Howie Weinberg
