= Forgodsake =

British rock band

- Origin: Newcastle Upon Tyne, England
- Genres: Hard rock
- Years active: 1990–1996
- Labels: Bleeding Hearts; Music for Nations
- Members: Kevin Ridley; Drew Gallon; Gary Binns
- Past members: Steve Wallace; Chris McCormack

Forgodsake were an English rock band from Newcastle Upon Tyne formed in 1990.

== History ==
Forgodsake formed in 1990 by Kevin Ridley, Steve Wallace, Drew Gallon, Gary Binns and Chris McCormack. They recorded a demo and signed to Bleeding Hearts Records, toured with bands such as Girlschool and The Wildhearts, then released their debut album, Blasthead, in 1993. In late 1994, McCormack and Wallace both left the band, with Ridley taking up guitar to fill in.

They released their second album, Gunk, in 1996, with solo contributions from Skyclad guitarist Steve Ramsey. Ridley left in 1997 to join Skyclad (who he had been acting as a producer for years prior) as a second guitarist, later taking up vocal duties for them as well.

Gallon and Wallace later went on to form punk rock band Automatic. Chris McCormack also formed a new band, 3 Colours Red, with Pete Vuckovic, Ben Harding and ex-Skyclad drummer Keith Baxter.

== Personnel ==
=== Final line-up ===
- Kevin Ridley – vocals, guitars (1990–1996)
- Drew Gallon – bass (1990–1996)
- Gary Binns – drums (1990–1996)

=== Previous members ===
- Chris McCormack – guitar (1990–1994)
- Steve Wallace – guitar (1990–1994)

=== Guest and touring members ===
- Martin Walkyier – additional vocals on the song "Skyhigh" from Blasthead (1994)
- Fritha Jenkins – guest on Blasthead (1994)
- Steve Ramsey – additional lead guitar on Gunk and touring (1996)

== Discography ==
- Blasthead – (Bleeding Hearts 1994)
1. "Armchair Enthusiast"
2. "Wake Up Now"
3. "If This Is What It Takes"
4. "Bad Sex"
5. "Half Past Anything"
6. "Blasthead"
7. "Strange"
8. "Negative"
9. "In Front of Me"
10. "Crash"
11. "This One"
12. "Not Today"
13. "Sky High"
14. "Dumbtown"
- Gunk – (1996)
1. "Gunk" (2.03)
2. "Conformists Song" (3.30)
3. "Painless" (2.24)
4. "One Lie" (3.51)
5. "Sad Man" (3.34)
6. "Sail Down" (6.13)
7. "Change Everything" (2.53)
8. "Our Man Flint" (4.38)
9. "Bed of Nails" (3.49)
10. "Stay Dry" (2.57)
11. "Stretched" (7.03)
12. "Find Out for Yourself" (hidden track, version of "Painless")
