= If You Ain't Got a Weapon... =

Compilation album by 3 Colours Red
- Released: 2005
- Recorded: 1996–1999
- Genres: Hard rock, punk rock, indie
- Label: Sanctuary

3 Colours Red chronology
The Union of Souls (2004)	If You Ain't Got a Weapon... (2005)	Nuclear Holiday (2005)

If You Ain't Got a Weapon... is a double compilation CD by UK Britrock band 3 Colours Red, covering their period with independent label Creation Records. The first disc features the band's singles plus two live tracks, while the second consists of B-sides. Both discs were compiled by frontman/bassist Pete Vuckovic. He also contributes handwritten sleevenotes. It was released by Sanctuary Records in 2005, alongside other compilations by Swervedriver and The Boo Radleys as part of their Creation Anthology. The album title comes from the lyrics of one of their most successful songs, "Nuclear Holiday".

== Track listing ==
Disc 1:

1. Paralyse
2. This Is My Hollywood
3. Pure
4. Nuclear Holiday
5. Beautiful Day
6. Sixty Mile Smile
7. This Is My Time (Radio Edit)
8. Copper Girl
9. This Is My Hollywood (London, 14.11.96)
10. Hateslick (Newcastle 27.10.96)
11. Pure (BBC session)
12. Beautiful Day (BBC session)
13. Paralyse (Reading Festival 24.08.99)

Disc 2:

1. God Shaped Hole
2. My Own Gauge
3. Fake Apology
4. If
5. Zip The Morals
6. Yellow Hair Carriage
7. Human Factory
8. On No-One's Side
9. Throughbreeze
10. Inside
11. Til I'm Ready
12. Everything
13. Age of Madness
14. Mental Blocks
15. Pirouette
16. Song on the Radio
17. Nerve Gas
18. Paranoid People
19. Calling to the Outside
20. Fit Boy And Faint Girl
21. Sunny in England
