= Pete Vuckovic =

British musician (born 1971)

Peter Bryan Vuckovic (born February 1971 in Devon, England) is an English singer-songwriter and bass player.

== Biography ==
Of half Serbian descent, Vuckovic grew up in Tiverton, Devon listening to hard rock and metal, singing and playing bass in bands with his older brother throughout his teens. His first success came in 1993 after leaving his own band, Blackout, and moving to Birmingham to join the reformed Diamond Head as their bassist. He recorded the Death and Progress and Evil Live albums with them but they split again soon after.

He is best known as the frontman and bassist in the Britrock band 3 Colours Red, with whom he wrote and recorded two UK Top 20 albums (Pure and Revolt), including six UK Top 40 singles during the late 1990s, most notably his own composition, "Beautiful Day", which went to number 11 in the UK Singles Chart and also garnered airplay on American radio.

In 1999, at their peak, they split due to the unfair dismissal of the band's manager.

He was signed by Sony Records and spent two years writing and recording an album for his new project, Elevation. They played shows in London and Manchester with Vuckovic on guitar as well as releasing an EP but, by the time it was finally finished, his A&R man had been sacked and Vuckovic was declared "free to go" by the incoming managing director. The album was never released.

3 Colours Red reformed in 2002 and recorded a third album (The Union of Souls) via Swansea-based label Might Atom Records, but they split again in 2005.

He later formed Bassknives and released the Come On You Motherfuckers EP on Mighty Atom Records in 2006.

Vuckovic currently resides in London, working as a sculptor, painter, and writer. In 2021, he released a new song I'm Gonna Die In New York City Tonight via his website. This was the first new material from him in more than 15 years. The website also featured a journal section - featuring tales of his time in 3 Colours Red as well as the time a teenage Vuckovic performed live onstage with Motorhead singer and bass player Lemmy.

He is a fan of Leeds United and on the 2004 3 Colours Red tour had the Leeds badge visible underneath the strings of his bass guitar.

== Discography ==
=== EPs ===
- Paralyse – 3 Colours Red (Creation, 1998)
- Come On You Motherfuckers – Bassknives (Mighty Atom, 2006)
- Special - Elevation (Crystalsongs, 2001)

=== Albums ===
- Death and Progress – Diamond Head (Castle, 1993)
- Evil Live (live) – Diamond Head (Castle, 1994)
- Pure – 3 Colours Red (Creation, 1997)
- Revolt – 3 Colours Red (Creation, 1999)
- The Union of Souls – 3 Colours Red (Mighty Atom, 2003)
- If You Ain't Got a Weapon... (compilation) – 3 Colours Red (Sanctuary, 2005)
- Nuclear Holiday (live) – 3 Colours Red (Snapper, 2005)

=== Non album singles ===
- I'm Gonna Die In New York City Tonight - Pete Vuckovic (online only single, 2021)
