= Steve Ramsey (guitarist) =

British guitarist

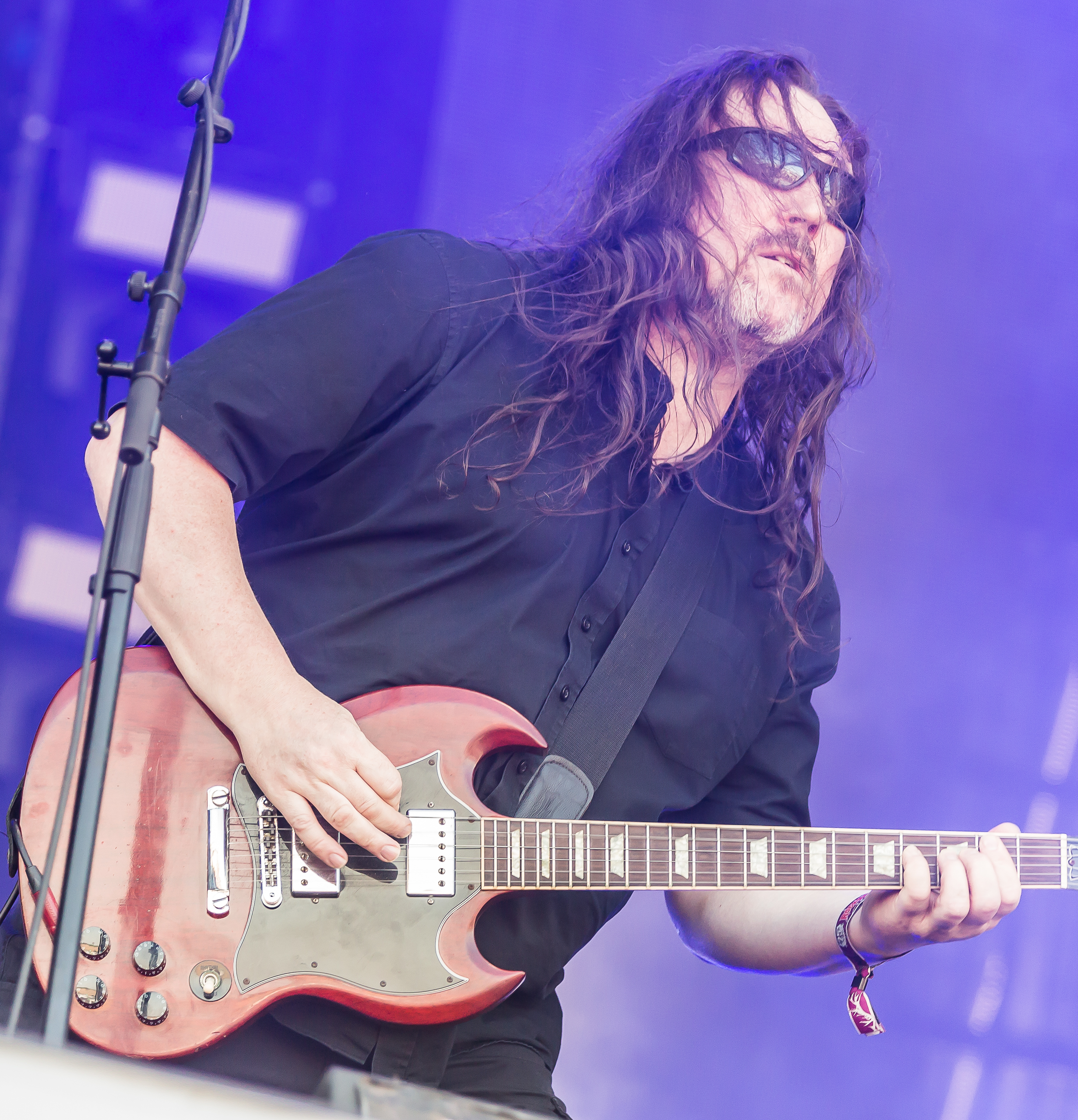
- Ramsey in 2018

Background information
- Genres: Heavy metal, folk metal
- Occupation: Guitarist
- Years active: 1981–present
- Member of: Skyclad, Satan
- Formerly of: Blind Fury, Pariah

Steve Ramsey is a British guitarist who began his career with the heavy metal band Satan in the early 1980s, releasing a single and an album, a second album under the band name Blind Fury, an EP and another album after changing the band name back to Satan and two more albums after renaming the band name once again, to Pariah.

After the split of Pariah in 1990, he teamed up with singer Martin Walkyier (ex-Sabbat) to form a heavy metal band with strong folk influences, called Skyclad.

Ramsey has also participated in other band projects, for example as album guest and live guitarist for Forgodsake.

Ramsey is influenced by classic hard rock acts like Thin Lizzy, Uriah Heep, etc. While initially starting as a thrash metal band with folk influences, these "classic" roots became more and more visible in Skyclad's music over the years.

== Discography ==
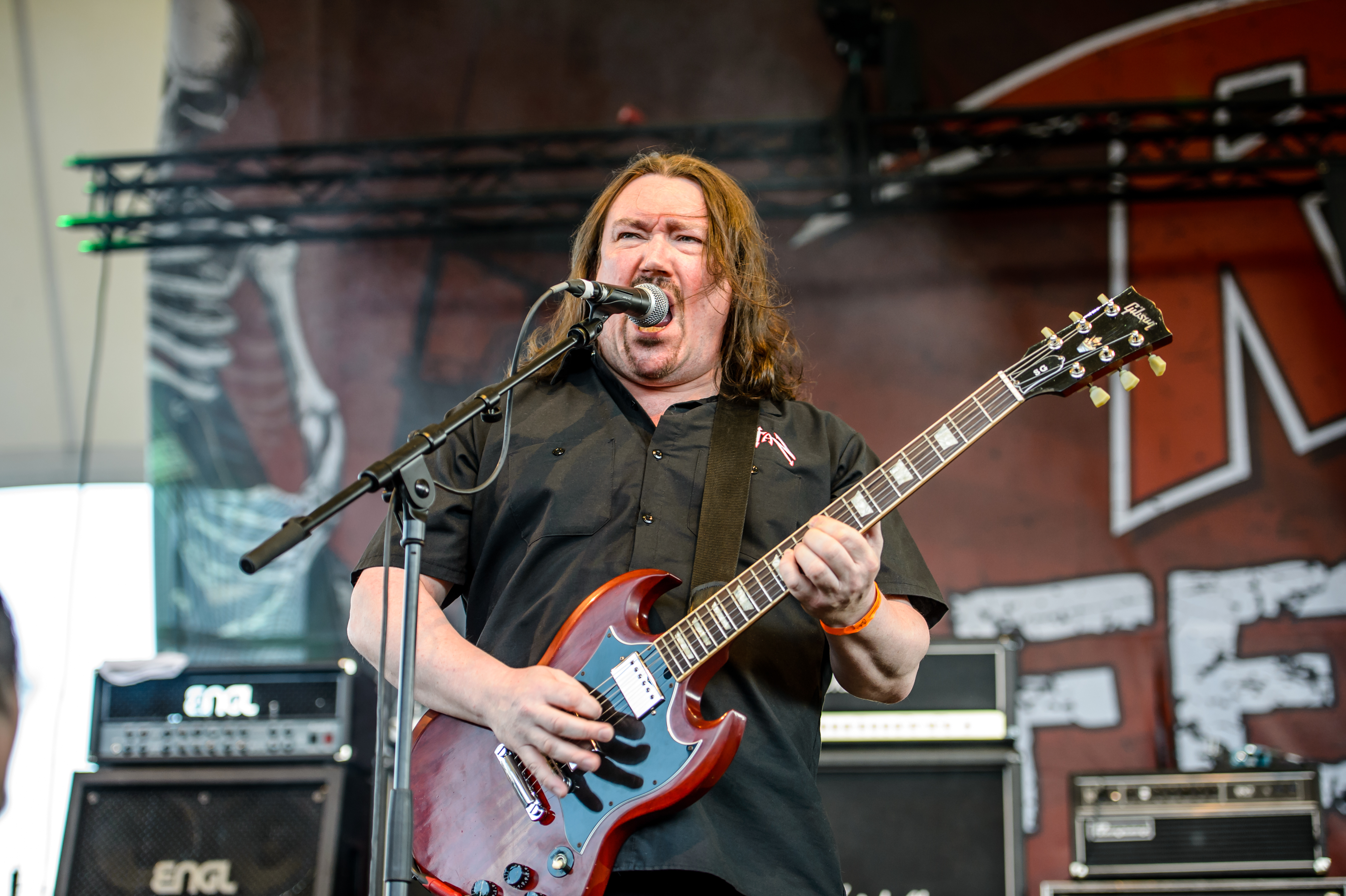
Ramsey performing in 2016

=== Satan ===
==== EPs/demos/live releases ====
- The First Demo (Demo), 1981
- Into the Fire (Demo), 1982
- Kiss of Death (Single), 1982
- Dirt Demo '86 (Demo), 1986
- Into the Future (EP), 1987
- Blitzkrieg in Holland (Live), 2000
- Live in the Act (Live), 2004

==== Studio albums ====
- Court in the Act, 1983
- Suspended Sentence, 1987
- Life Sentence, 2013
- Atom by Atom, 2015
- Cruel Magic, 2018
- Early Rituals, 2020
- Earth Infernal, 2022
- Songs in Crimson, 2024

==== Blind Fury ====
- Demo '84 (Demo), 1984

===== Studio albums =====
- Out of Reach, 1985

==== Pariah ====
===== Studio albums =====
- Pariah The Kindred, 1988
- Pariah Blaze of Obscurity, 1989
- Pariah Unity, 1998

==== Skyclad ====
- Lemming Project / Skyclad (Split), 1991
- Tracks from the Wilderness (EP), 1992
- Thinking Allowed? (EP), 1993
- Old Rope (Compilation), 1997
- Outrageous Fourtunes (EP), 1998
- Classix Shape (EP), 1999
- Poetic Wisdom (Compilation), 2001
- Another Fine Mess (Live), 2001
- Swords of a Thousand Men (Single), 2001
- Live at the Dynamo (Live), 2002
- History Lessens (Compilation), 2002
- Jig-a-Jig (EP) 2006

===== Studio albums =====
- The Wayward Sons of Mother Earth, 1991
- A Burnt Offering for the Bone Idol, 1992
- Jonah's Ark, 1993
- Prince of the Poverty Line, 1994
- The Silent Whales of Lunar Sea, 1995
- Irrational Anthems, 1996
- Oui Avant-Garde a Chance, 1996
- The Answer Machine?, 1997
- Vintage Whine, 1999
- Folkémon, 2000
- No Daylights Nor Heeltaps (Re-recording album), 2002
- A Semblance of Normality , 2004
- In the... All Together, 2009
