= Andy Sneap =

British record producer and guitarist

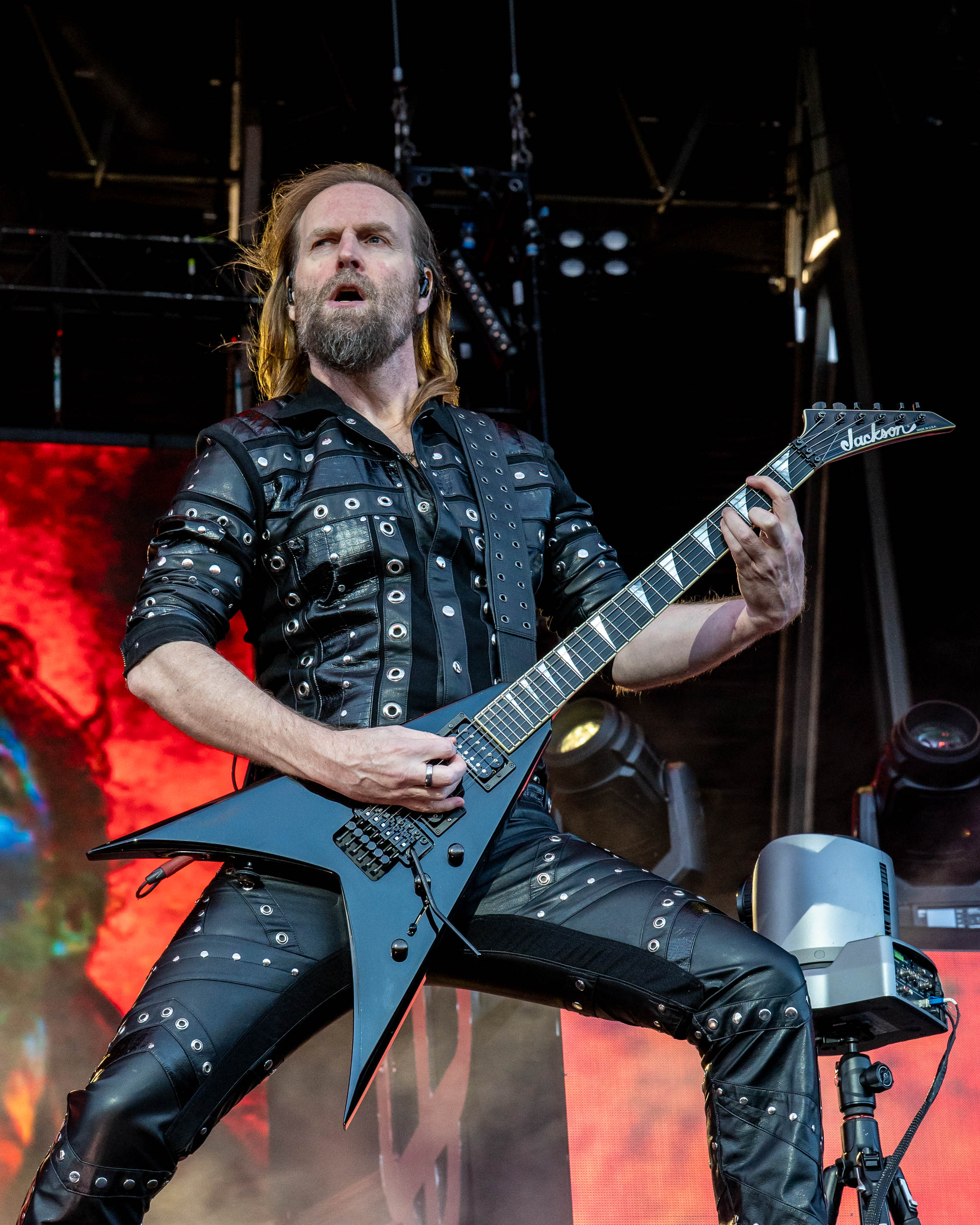
- Sneap with Judas Priest at the Tons of Rock festival in Oslo, Norway, in 2024

Background information
- Born: 18 July 1969 (age 57); Belper, Derbyshire, England
- Genres: Heavy metal, thrash metal
- Occupations: Musician, record producer, composer, audio engineer
- Instrument: Guitar
- Years active: 1984–present

Andy Sneap (born 18 July 1969) is an English guitarist, record producer, and composer with over 100 albums to his name, most of which have been produced at his Backstage Recording studios in rural Derbyshire. Some of the most critically acclaimed mixing-work on albums include Deliverance by Opeth and Disarm the Descent by Killswitch Engage, for which he earned a Swedish Grammis and a US Grammy nomination, respectively. As a performer, he first built his reputation as one of the guitarists in the British thrash metal band Sabbat, and played with them up until their disbanding. He is currently one of the co-guitarists of the British heavy metal band Hell. In 2018, Sneap joined Judas Priest as a touring guitarist, following long-time lead guitarist Glenn Tipton's reduction of touring due to Parkinson's disease.

He is one of the most active music producers in the heavy metal music genre and has worked with bands such as Judas Priest, Accept, Blaze Bayley, Dream Theater, Saxon, Opeth, Amon Amarth, Arch Enemy, Exodus, Megadeth, Kataklysm, Kreator, Nevermore, Testament, Carcass, Fear Factory, Overkill and DevilDriver. He also mixed Megadeth's show from the DVD The Big Four: Live from Sofia, Bulgaria, also featuring Metallica, Slayer and Anthrax.

== Biography ==
Andy Sneap was born on 18 July 1969 in Belper, Derbyshire. He got his first guitar and amplifier from his parents at age 12 as a Christmas present. He started learning guitar with founding Hell member Dave Halliday, who had a huge effect on Andy and left him all the rights to all his songs and equipment in his will following his death. Sneap joined a British heavy metal band called Hydra as the second guitarist when he was 15 years old. But two weeks later, the original guitarist and drummer quit, Simon Negus joined them, and the band's name changed to Sabbat.

After disbanding Hydra and forming a new band, they chose Sabbat as the new name, which came from a book on witchcraft. After one year of rehearsing, they recorded a four-track demo tape, Fragments of a Faith Forgotten. Sneap distributed the demo tape to many record companies, but on listening, Berlin-based recording company Noise Records showed interest and asked for more material. In 1987, Noise Records offered the band a recording contract, but the contract could not be signed until Sneap turned 18 years old in July 1987. So they made a plan to start recording the band's first full studio album, History of a Time to Come. Andy wrote all the music while Martin Walkyier was responsible for the lyrics. Sabbat released the album on 20 April 1988 via Noise Records, which received positive attention from journalists and fans alike.

In January 1989 Sneap and the other band members entered Sky Trak Studio in Berlin to start recording their second album, Dreamweaver, which was a concept album based on the 1983 book by Brian Bates – The Way of Wyrd: Tales of an Anglo-Saxon Sorcerer. Andy wrote almost all of the music except three songs, which Simon Jones also wrote with Andy. The album has come to be regarded as a classic of the thrash metal genre, which reflects Andy's predilection at that time for increasingly lengthy and progressively technical thrash metal songs.

== Discography ==
=== As a band member ===
| Band | Album details | Role | Source |
|---|---|---|---|
| Sabbat | History of a Time to Come: Label: Noise Records; Release date: 20 April 1988 | Composer, Guitar, Remastering | |
| Sabbat | Dreamweaver: Label: Noise Records; Release date: 15 May 1989 | Composer, Guitar, Remastering | |
| Sabbat | Mourning Has Broken: Label: Noise Records; Release date: 26 March 1991 | Composer, Guitar | |
| Hell | Human Remains: Label: Nuclear Blast; Release date: 13 May 2011 | Engineer, Guitar, Mixing, Producer | |
| Hell | Curse and Chapter: Label: Nuclear Blast; Release date: 22 November 2013 | Composer, engineer, Guitar, Mixing, Producer | |

=== Selected production ===
| Year | Album details | Role | Source |
|---|---|---|---|
| 1994 | English Dogs – Bow to None: Label: Impact Records; Release date: 1994 | Assistant, Mixing | |
| 1996 | Dearly Beheaded – Temptation: Label: Music for Nations; Release date: 3 June 1996 | Engineer | |
| 1997 | Machine Head – The More Things Change...: Label: Roadrunner Records; Release date: 25 March 1997 | Mixing | |
| 1997 | Napalm Death – Inside the Torn Apart: Label: Earache Records; Release date: 3 June 1997 | Mixing | |
| 1997 | Exodus – Another Lesson in Violence: Label: Century Media Records; Release date: 8 July 1997 | Producer | |
| 1997 | Skinlab – Bound, Gagged and Blindfolded: Label: Century Media; Release date: 8 July 1997 | Engineer, Mixing, Producer | |
| 1997 | Napalm Death – Breed to Breathe (EP): Label: Earache Records; Release date: 17 November 1997 | Mixing | |
| 1998 | Obituary – Dead: Label: Roadrunner; Release date: 21 April 1998 | Mixing | |
| 1998 | English Dogs – All the World's a Rage: Label: Impact Records; Release date: 25 August 1998 | Producer | |
| 1998 | Earth Crisis – Breed the Killers: Label: Roadrunner; Release date: 8 September 1998 | Audio Engineer, Audio Production, engineer, Mixing, Producer | |
| 1999 | Skinlab – Disembody: The New Flesh: Label: Century Media; Release date: 23 February 1999 | Mixing, Producer, Vocals (Additional) | |
| 1999 | Testament – The Gathering: Label: Burnt Offerings, Spitfire Records (1999), Prosthetic Records (2008); Release date: 28 June 1999 | Engineer, Mixing | |
| 1999 | Artillery – B.A.C.K.: Label: Die Hard music; Release date: 2 October 1999 | Mixing | |
| 2000 | B L A Z E – Silicon Messiah: Label: SPV; Release date: 22 May 2000 | Engineer, Mastering, Mixing, Producer | |
| 2000 | Nevermore – Dead Heart in a Dead World: Label: Century Media; Release date: 17 October 2000 | Engineer, Mastering, Mixing, Producer | |
| 2000 | Fozzy – Fozzy: Label: Palm Pictures / Megaforce Records; Release date: 24 October 2000 | Mastering, Mixing | |
| 2001 | Arch Enemy – Wages of Sin: Label: Century Media; Release date: 2 April 2001 | Mastering, Mixing | |
| 2001 | Kreator – Violent Revolution: Label: SPV/Steamhammer Records; Release date: 25 September 2001 | Engineer, Mastering, Mixing, Producer | |
| 2001 | Testament – First Strike Still Deadly: Label: Spitfire Records; Release date: 24 October 2001 | Audio Engineer, Mixing | |
| 2002 | B L A Z E – Tenth Dimension: Label: SPV; Release date: 15 January 2002 | Engineer, Mastering, Mixing, Producer | |
| 2002 | Arch Enemy – Burning Angel: Label: Century Media; Release date: 6 March 2002 | Mastering, Mixing | |
| 2002 | Killswitch Engage – Alive or Just Breathing: Label: Roadrunner; Release date: 21 May 2002 | Mastering, Mixing | |
| 2002 | Skinlab – Revolting Room: Label: Century Media; Release date: 27 May 2002 | Additional tracking, Mixing | |
| 2002 | Living Sacrifice – Conceived in Fire: Label: Solid State Records; Release date: 24 September 2002 | Mastering, Mixing | |
| 2002 | Opeth – Deliverance: Label: Koch, Music for Nations; Release date: 12 November 2002 | Mixing | |
| 2002 | Masterplan – Enlighten Me: Label: AFM Records; Release date: 18 November 2002 | Engineer, producer | |
| 2003 | Masterplan – Masterplan: Label: AFM Records; Release date: 20 January 2003 | Engineer, producer | |
| 2003 | B L A Z E – As Live as It Gets: Label: SPV; Release date: 25 March 2003 | Engineer, Mastering, Mixing, Producer | |
| 2003 | Nevermore – Enemies of Reality: Label: Century Media; Release date: 29 July 2003, April 2005 (reissue) | Remastering, Remixing (2005 reissue) | |
| 2003 | Arch Enemy – Anthems of Rebellion: Label: Century Media; Release date: 23 August 2003 | Engineer, Mastering, Mixing, Pre-Production, Producer | |
| 2003 | MTV2 Headbangers Ball: Label: Roadrunner; Release date: 7 October 2003 | Mixing, producer | |
| 2003 | Machine Head – Through the Ashes of Empires: Label: Roadrunner; Release date: 31 October 2003 | Technician | |
| 2003 | Opeth – Lamentations (Live at Shepherd's Bush Empire 2003): Label: Koch, Music for Nations; Release date: 24 November 2003 | Mixing, Recording | |
| 2004 | Exodus – Tempo of the Damned: Label: Nuclear Blast Records, King Records (Japan), Dream On Music (Korea); Release date: 2 February 2004 | Engineer, Mastering, Mixing, Producer | |
| 2004 | 36 Crazyfists – A Snow Capped Romance: Label: Roadrunner; Release date: 16 March 2004 | Mastering, Mixing | |
| 2004 | B L A Z E – Blood & Belief: Label: SPV/Steamhammer; Release date: 26 April 2004 | Audio Engineer, Audio Production, engineer, Mastering, Mixing, Photography, Producer | |
| 2004 | Killswitch Engage – The End of Heartache: Label: Roadrunner; Release date: 11 May 2004 | Mastering, Mixing | |
| 2004 | Caliban – The Opposite from Within: Label: Roadrunner; Release date: 17 October 2004 | Audio Engineer, Mastering, Mixing | |
| 2004 | Bullet for My Valentine – Bullet for My Valentine: Label: Visible Noise; Release date: 15 November 2004 | Mastering | |
| 2005 | Kreator – Enemy of God: Label: SPV/Steamhammer; Release date: 10 January 2005 | Audio Production, Mixing, Producer | |
| 2005 | Trivium – Ascendancy: Label: Roadrunner; Release date: 15 March 2005 | Mastering, Mixing, Vocals | |
| 2005 | As I Lay Dying – Shadows Are Security: Label: Metal Blade Records; Release date: 14 June 2005 | Mastering, Mixing | |
| 2005 | Arch Enemy – Doomsday Machine: Label: Century Media; Release date: 26 July 2005 | Mastering, Mixing | |
| 2005 | Nevermore – This Godless Endeavor: Label: Century Media; Release date: 26 July 2005 | Engineering, Mastering, Mixing, Producer | |
| 2005 | Bullet for My Valentine – Hand of Blood: Label: Trustkill Records; Release date: 22 August 2005 | Audio Production, Mastering | |
| 2005 | Bullet for My Valentine – The Poison: Label: Visible Noise; Release date: 3 October 2005 | Mixing, Producer (track 6) | |
| 2005 | Exodus – Shovel Headed Kill Machine: Label: Nuclear Blast; Release date: 4 October 2005 | Mastering, Mixing | |
| 2006 | Caliban – The Undying Darkness: Label: Abacus; Release date: 4 April 2006 | Mastering, Mixing | |
| 2006 | As I Lay Dying – A Long March: The First Recordings: Label: Metal Blade; Release date: 16 May 2006 | Mixing (tracks 1 and 3) | |
| 2006 | 36 Crazyfists – Rest Inside the Flames: Label: Roadrunner, DRT Entertainment; 12 June 2006 | Mastering, Mixing | |
| 2006 | Kerrang Album: Release date: 11 September 2006 | Producer | |
| 2006 | Into Eternity – The Scattering of Ashes: Label: Century Media; Release date: 3 October 2006 | Mastering, Mixing | |
| 2006 | Cradle of Filth – Thornography: Label: Roadrunner; Release date: 17 October 2006 | Mastering, Mixing | |
| 2007 | Onslaught – Killing Peace: Label: Candlelight Records; Release date: 5 March 2007 | Mixing, Producer | |
| 2007 | Chimaira – Resurrection: Label: Ferret Music (U.S.), Nuclear Blast (Worldwide); Release date: 6 March 2007 | Audio Engineer, Engineer, Mixing | |
| 2007 | Annihilator – Metal: Label: SPV/Steamhammer; Release date: 16 April 2007 | Mixing, Producer | |
| 2007 | Job for a Cowboy – Genesis: Label: Metal Blade; Release date: 15 May 2007 | Mastering, Mixing | |
| 2007 | Megadeth – United Abominations: Label: Roadrunner; Release date: 15 May 2007 | Audio Engineer, Audio Production, engineer, Mastering, Mixing, Producer | |
| 2007 | Rise to Addiction – A New Shade of Black for the Soul: Label: Mausoleum Records; Release date: 21 May 2007 | Audio Production, engineer, Mixing, Producer | |
| 2007 | Despised Icon – The Ills of Modern Man: Label: Century Media; Release date: 22 May 2007 | Mastering, Mixing | |
| 2007 | DevilDriver – The Last Kind Words: Label: Roadrunner; Release date: 31 July 2007 | Mastering, Mixing | |
| 2007 | As I Lay Dying – An Ocean Between Us: Label: Metal Blade; Release date: 21 August 2007 | Technician (guitar re-amping) | |
| 2007 | Exodus – The Atrocity Exhibition... Exhibit A: Label: Nuclear Blast; Release date: 26 October 2007 | Engineer, Mixing, Producer | |
| 2008 | Testament – The Formation of Damnation: Label: Nuclear Blast; Release date: 29 April 2008 | Engineer, Mixing | |
| 2008 | 36 Crazyfists – The Tide and Its Takers: Label: Ferret; Release date: 27 May 2008 | Mastering, Mixing | |
| 2008 | Soulfly – Conquer: Label: Roadrunner; Release date: 29 July 2008 | Mixing | |
| 2008 | Unearth – The March: Label: Metal Blade; Release date: 14 October 2008 | Mastering, Mixing | |
| 2008 | Nevermore – The Year of the Voyager: Label: Century Media; Release date: 20 October 2008 | Mastering, Mixing | |
| 2008 | Cradle of Filth – Godspeed on the Devil's Thunder: Label: Roadrunner; Release date: 28 October 2008 | Audio Engineer, Audio Production, Engineer, Mastering, Mixing, Producer | |
| 2008 | Exodus – Let There Be Blood: Label: Zaentz Records; Release date: 28 October 2008 | Mastering, Mixing | |
| 2009 | Iron Monkey – Our Problem: Label: Earache Records; Release date: 26 May 2009 | Engineer, Mixing, Producer | |
| 2009 | DevilDriver – Pray for Villains: Label: Roadrunner; Release date: 14 July 2009 | Guitar Producer, Mastering, Mixing, Mixing Advisor | |
| 2009 | Megadeth – Endgame: Label: Roadrunner; Release date: 14 September 2009 | Engineer, Mastering, Mixing, Producer | |
| 2009 | Arch Enemy – The Root of All Evil: Label: Century Media; Release date: 28 September 2009 | Mastering, Mixing | |
| 2010 | Living Sacrifice – The Infinite Order: Label: Solid State; Release date: 26 January 2010 | Mastering, Mixing | |
| 2010 | Exodus – Exhibit B: The Human Condition: Label: Nuclear Blast; Release date: 7 May 2010 | Mastering, Mixing, Producer | |
| 2010 | Nevermore – The Obsidian Conspiracy: Label: Century Media; Release date: 8 June 2010 | Mastering, Mixing | |
| 2010 | 36 Crazyfists – Collisions and Castaways: Label: Ferret, Roadrunner; Release date: 27 July 2010 | Mastering, Mixing | |
| 2010 | Accept – Blood of the Nations: Label: Nuclear Blast; Release date: 20 August 2010 | Engineer, Mastering, Mixing, Producer | |
| 2010 | Dimmu Borgir – Abrahadabra: Label: Nuclear Blast; Release date: 22 September 2010 | Guest Artist, Mixing | |
| 2010 | Megadeth – "Sudden Death": Label: Roadrunner; Release date: 28 September 2010 | Mixing | |
| 2010 | Slayer – The Big Four: Live from Sofia, Bulgaria: Label: Warner Bros. (U.S.), Vertigo Records/Mercury Records (Europe); Release date: 29 October 2010 | Mixing | |
| 2010 | Cradle of Filth – Darkly, Darkly, Venus Aversa: Label: Peaceville Records (Europe), Nuclear Blast (U.S.); Release date: 1 November 2010 | Assistant Engineer, Mastering | |
| 2011 | DevilDriver – Beast: Label: Roadrunner; Release date: 22 February 2011 | Mastering, Mixing | |
| 2011 | Arch Enemy – Khaos Legions: Label: Century Media; Release date: 30 May 2011 | Mastering, Mixing | |
| 2011 | Megadeth – Thirteen: Label: Roadrunner; Release date: 1 November 2011 | Additional engineering | |
| 2012 | Accept – Stalingrad: Label: Nuclear Blast; Release date: 6 April 2012 | Engineer, Mastering, Mixing, Producer | |
| 2012 | Testament – Dark Roots of Earth: Label: Nuclear Blast; Release date: 27 July 2012 | Additional Footage, engineer, Mastering, Mixing, Producer | |
| 2013 | Saxon – Sacrifice: Label: UDR; Release date: 1 March 2013 | Mastering, Mixing, Producer | |
| 2013 | Killswitch Engage – Disarm the Descent: Label: Roadrunner; Release date: 2 April 2013 | Mastering, Mixing | |
| 2013 | Amon Amarth – Deceiver of the Gods: Label: Metal Blade; Release date: 25 June 2013 | Engineer, Mastering, Mixing, Producer | |
| 2013 | Carcass – Surgical Steel: Label: Nuclear Blast; Release date: 13 September 2013 | Mastering, Mixing | |
| 2013 | XXX: Three Decades of Roadrunner Records: Label: Roadrunner; Release date: 30 September 2013 | Mixing, Producer | |
| 2014 | Ronnie James Dio – This Is Your Life: Label: Rhino Entertainment; Release date: 25 March 2014 (Japan), 31 March 2014 | Engineer | |
| 2014 | Accept – Blind Rage: Label: Nuclear Blast; Release date: 15 August 2014 | Mastering, Mixing, Producer | |
| 2014 | Exodus – Blood In, Blood Out: Label: Nuclear Blast; Release date: 14 October 2014 | Engineer (drums), Mastering, Mixing, Tracking | |
| 2014 | Machine Head – Bloodstone & Diamonds: Label: Nuclear Blast; Release date: 10 November 2014 | Additional tracking, editing, and mixing | |
| 2014 | Carcass – Surgical Remission/Surplus Steel (EP): Label: Nuclear Blast; Release date: 11 November 2014 | Mastering, Mixing | |
| 2015 | Kataklysm – Of Ghosts and Gods: Label: Nuclear Blast; Release date: 31 July 2015 | Mastering, Mixing | |
| 2015 | Fear Factory – Genexus: Label: Nuclear Blast; Release date: 7 August 2015 | Mastering, Mixing | |
| 2015 | Saxon – Battering Ram: Label: UDR; Release date: 16 October 2015 | Engineer, Mastering, Mixing, Producer | |
| 2016 | Amon Amarth – Jomsviking: Label: Metal Blade; Release date: 25 March 2016 | Engineer, Mixing, Producer | |
| 2016 | Despised Icon – Beast: Label: Nuclear Blast; Release date: 22 June 2016 | Mastering, Mixing | |
| 2016 | Testament – Brotherhood of the Snake: Label: Nuclear Blast; Release Date: 28 October 2016 | Mastering, Mixing | |
| 2017 | Overkill – The Grinding Wheel: Label: Nuclear Blast; Release date: 10 February 2017 | Mixing | |
| 2017 | Accept – The Rise of Chaos: Label: Nuclear Blast; Release date: 4 August 2017 | Mastering, Mixing, Producer | |
| 2018 | Saxon – Thunderbolt: Label: Silver Lining; Release Date: 2 February 2018 | Engineer, Mixing, Producer | |
| 2018 | Judas Priest – Firepower: Label: Epic Records; Release Date: 9 March 2018 | Co-Producer (Along with Tom Allom), Engineer, Mastering, Mixing | |
| 2019 | Overkill – The Wings of War: Label: Nuclear Blast; Release date: 22 February 2019 | Mastering, Mixing (track 11) | |
| 2019 | Xentrix – Bury the Pain: Label: Listenable Records; Release date: 7 June 2019 | Mixing | |
| 2019 | Killswitch Engage – Atonement: Label: Metal Blade; Release date: 16 August 2019 | Mastering, Mixing | |
| 2020 | Testament – Titans of Creation: Label: Nuclear Blast; Release Date: 3 April 2020 | Mastering, Mixing | |
| 2020 | Kreator – "666 - World Divided": Label: Nuclear Blast; Release date: 10 April 2020 | Producer | |
| 2020 | John Petrucci – Terminal Velocity: Label: Sound Mind Music/The Orchard; Release Date: 28 August 2020 | Mastering, Mixing | |
| 2021 | Accept – Too Mean to Die: Label: Nuclear Blast; Release date: 29 January 2021 | Mixing, Producer | |
| 2021 | Fear Factory – Aggression Continuum: Label: Nuclear Blast; Release date: 18 June 2021 | Mastering, Mixing | |
| 2021 | Dream Theater – A View from the Top of the World: Label: Inside Out Music; Release Date: 22 October 2021 | Mastering, Mixing | |
| 2021 | Exodus – Persona Non Grata: Label: Nuclear Blast; Release date: 19 November 2021 | Mixing | |
| 2022 | Saxon – Carpe Diem: Label: Silver Lining; Release date: 4 February 2022 | Mastering, Mixing, Producer | |
| 2022 | Annihilator – Metal II: Label: earMUSIC; Release date: 18 February 2022 | Re-amping (guitars) | |
| 2022 | Amon Amarth – The Great Heathen Army: Label: Metal Blade; Release date: 5 August 2022 | Mastering, Mixing, Producer | |
| 2022 | Xentrix – Seven Words: Label: Listenable; Release date: 4 November 2022 | Mixing | |
| 2023 | Elegant Weapons – Horns for a Halo: Label: Nuclear Blast; Release date: 26 May 2023 | Mastering, Mixing, Engineering, Producer | |
| 2024 | Saxon – Hell, Fire and Damnation: Label: Silver Lining; Release date: 19 January 2024 | Mastering, Mixing, Producer | |
| 2024 | Judas Priest – Invincible Shield: Label: Epic; Release date: 8 March 2024 | Engineer, Mixing, Producer, Guitar | |
| 2024 | Accept – Humanoid: Label: Napalm Records; Release date: 26 April 2024 | Mastering, Mixing, Producer | |
| 2025 | Dream Theater – Parasomnia: Label: Inside Out; Release date: 7 February 2025 | Engineering, Mastering, Mixing | |
| 2025 | Exodus – "He's a Woman, She's a Man" (Scorpions cover): Label: Napalm; Release date: 22 April 2025 | Mastering, Mixing | |
| 2025 | Judas Priest, Ozzy Osbourne – "War Pigs" (Charity Version) (Black Sabbath cover): Label: Sony Music; Release date: 26 September 2025 | Engineer, Mastering, Mixing, Producer | |
| 2026 | Elegant Weapons – Evolution: Label: Exciter Records; Release date: 24 April 2026 | Mixing, Producer | |
| 2026 | Iommi – From the Dark: Label: BMG; Release date: 23 October 2026 | Mixing | |
| 2026 | Xentrix – Allied with the Enemy: Label: Listenable; Release date: 30 October 2026 | Producer | |
| 2026 | Prong – Prong: Label: Napalm; Release date: 6 November 2026 | Mastering, Mixing | |
| 2027 | Saxon – Gods of Thunder: Label: Silver Lining; Release date: 22 January 2027 | Mixing | |
