= Beneath the Surface =

Beneath the Surface may refer to:

== Music ==
- Beneath the Surface (GZA album) 1999
- Beneath the Surface (Incognito album), 1996
- Beneath the Surface (record label), a record label of hip-hop producer Omid Walizadeh
- An Dara Craiceann: Beneath The Surface, a 1995 album by Irish singer Pádraigín Ní Uallacháin
- Beneath the Surface, a 2002 album by Balligomingo
- "Beneath the Surface", a song by Souljahz from the 2002 album The Fault Is History
- "Beneath The Surface", a song by Skinlab from the 2004 album Nerve Damage

== Visual media ==
- Beneath the Surface (1997 film), a Swedish film directed by Daniel Fridell
- Beneath the Surface (2007 film), American comedy horror film by Blake Reigle
- Beneath the Surface (2021 film), Canadian documentary film by Marie-Geneviève Chabot
- Beneath the Surface (picture book), by Gary Crew and illustrated by Steven Woolman
- "Beneath the Surface" (Doctors), a 2005 television episode
- "Beneath the Surface" (Stargate SG-1), an episode of the American-Canadian TV series

== See also ==
- Below the Surface (disambiguation)
