= Allied with the Enemy =

Studio album by Xentrix
- Released: 30 October 2026
- Recorded: 2025-2026
- Studios: Backstage Studios; Echo Base Studio
- Genre: Thrash metal
- Length: 45:34
- Label: Listenable Records
- Producer: Andy Sneap

Xentrix chronology
Seven Words (2022)	Allied with the Enemy (2026)

Singles from Allied with the Enemy
- 1. "Allied with the Enemy" Released: 1 August 2026; 2. "Nil by Mouth" Released: 30 September 2026

Allied with the Enemy is the seventh studio album by British thrash metal band Xentrix, and released 30 October 2026 through Listenable Records. To promote the album, the band produced music videos for the title track and "Nil by Mouth", and they will embark on a UK tour with Nervosa in November.

== Background ==
The album was produced by Andy Sneap and was originally planned for release in the late Spring. The cover art features the suit-wearing man from the band's 1990 album For Whose Advantage?, whom they named Graham due to his similar likeness to former Rainbow and Alcatrazz vocalist Graham Bonnet.

== Track listing ==
No.	Title	Length
1.	"Rip Saw"	6:05
2.	"Allied with the Enemy"	3:16
3.	"Killer Unknown"	4:44
4.	"On Burned Remains"	5:19
5.	"Nil by Mouth"	4:09
6.	"Doomsday Hook"	3:44
7.	"The Dark Eternal"	6:08
8.	"Where the Madness Lies"	2:39
9.	"Snake in Waiting"	4:43
10.	"No Bridges Left to Burn"	4:56

CD and digital bonus track
No.	Title	Length
11.	"We Drink the Same Poison"	4:52

== Personnel ==
Xentrix

- Jay Walsh – vocals, rhythm guitar
- Dennis Gasser – drums
- Chris Shires – bass
- Kristian "Stan" Havard – lead guitar

Production

- Dan Goldsworthy – artwork, layout
- Andy Sneap – producer, mixing, mastering

== Charts ==
Chart performance for Allied with the Enemy
Chart (2026)	Peak position
French Rock & Metal Albums (SNEP)	98
UK Independent Albums (Official Charts)	43
UK Rock & Metal Albums (Official Charts)	21
