= Nerve Damage =

Compilation album by Skinlab
- Released: 2004
- Genre: Groove metal; nu metal

Skinlab chronology
ReVoltingRoom (2002)	Nerve Damage (2004)	The Scars Between Us (2009)

Nerve Damage is a compilation album by American metal band Skinlab, released in 2004. It is a 2CD collection of rare and unreleased material, including a live set, demos, remixes, alternate mixes, and two new tracks.

== Reception ==
Blabbermouth rated the album seven out of ten, stating "this is a cool enough celebration of a band unwilling to plough the same old furrow ad infinitum". Chronicles of Chaos gave it a rating of seven out of ten.

== Track listing ==
=== Disc 1 ===
1. "Losing All" – 4:04
2. "Beneath The Surface" – 3:07
3. "Anthem (Radio Edit)" – 3:13
4. "Come Get It (Alternative Mix)" – 3:48
5. "One Of Us (Alternative Mix)" – 4:53
6. "Jesus Cells (Demo)" – 5:59
7. "Disturbing The Art Of Expression (Demo)" – 5:09
8. "Take As Needed (Demo)" – 3:32
9. "Bullet With Butterfly Wings (Smashing Pumpkins Cover)" – 4:21
10. "Slave The Way (Remix)" – 3:00
11. "Purify (Remix)" – 3:50
12. "Stumble (Suffer EP)" – 4:10
13. "Down (Suffer EP)" – 4:08
14. "Dissolve (Suffer EP)" – 4:18
15. "Noah (Suffer EP)" – 5:24

=== Disc 2 ===
1. "Paleface (Remixed James Murphy Roadrunner Demo)" – 4:22
2. "Promised (Roadrunner Demo)" – 6:29
3. "The Art Of Suffering (Roadrunner Demo)" – 5:10
4. "Ten Seconds (Roadrunner Demo)" – 4:50
5. "Race Of Hate (Live Demo)" – 5:19
6. "When Pain Comes To Surface (Circle Of Vengeance Demo)" – 3:29
7. "Blacklist (Circle Of Vengeance Demo)" – 3:26
8. "Slave The Way (Live)" – 2:56
9. "Purify (Live)" – 3:57
10. "No Sympathy (Live)" – 3:24
11. "Scapegoat (Live)" – 3:09
12. "Know Your Enemies (Live)" – 2:58
13. "Come Get It (Live)" – 4:14
14. "When Pain Comes To Surface (Live)" – 3:49
