= Eyesore (EP) =

EP by Skinlab
- Released: November 3, 1998
- Genre: Groove metal
- Length: 20:18
- Label: Century Media
- Producer: Skinlab

Skinlab chronology
| Bound, Gagged and Blindfolded (1997) | Eyesore (1998) | Disembody: The New Flesh (1999) |

Eyesore is a limited edition E.P. by American groove metal band Skinlab. The E.P. was released November 3, 1998. Only 5,000 copies were made.

It was given a rating of eight by Chronicles of Chaos.

== Track listing ==
1. "So Far from the Truth" – 4:40
2. "Noah" – 4:48
3. "Raza Odiada (Pito Wilson)" – 2:08
4. "When Pain Comes to Surface (Demo)" – 4:31
5. "Paleface (Live)" – 4:11
