= Below the Surface =

Below the Surface may refer to:

- Below the Surface (1938 film), an adventure tale set in the coal region of Newcastle, Australia
- Below the Surface (1920 film), an American silent drama film directed by Irvin Willat and starring Hobart Bosworth
- Below the Surface (TV series), a 2017 Danish nordic noir drama series, written and directed by Kasper Barfoed

== See also ==
- Under the Surface (disambiguation)
- Beneath the Surface (disambiguation)
