= Sabbat (English band) =

British thrash metal band

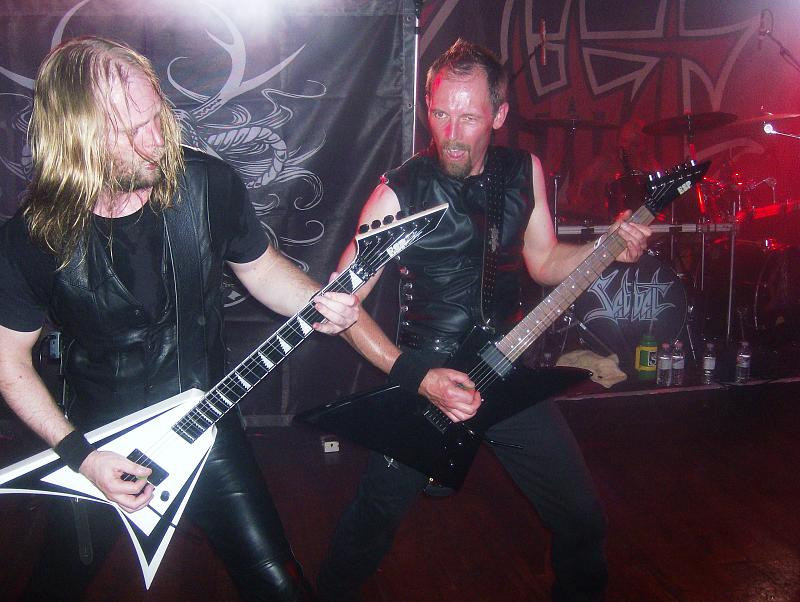
- Andy Sneap and Simon "Jack Hammer" Jones (2008)

Background information
- Origin: Nottingham, England
- Genre: Thrash metal
- Years active: 1985–1991, 2006–2010
- Label: Noise
- Past members: Andy Sneap; Simon Negus; Martin Walkyier; Simon Jones; Gizz Butt; Neil Watson; Wayne Banks; Richie Desmond; Richard Scott; Frazer Craske

Sabbat were an English thrash metal band from Nottingham consisting of Martin Walkyier (vocals), Andy Sneap (guitars), Simon Jones (guitars), Frazer Craske (bass) and Simon Negus (drums). They are considered one of the "Big Four" of British thrash metal along with Acid Reign, Onslaught and Xentrix, who developed and popularised the country's thrash metal scene in the late 1980s and early 1990s.

In their first six years, Sabbat released three studio albums, four demos, two split singles/compilation albums, two singles and a live VHS. In 1988, the band released their debut album, History of a Time to Come, which earned them recognition. Their second album, Dreamweaver (Reflections of Our Yesterdays) (1989), was critically acclaimed. Shortly after the release of Mourning Has Broken (1991), financial issues caused Sabbat to disband. After an attempted reunion in 2001 that Sneap blocked, the original line-up reunited in 2006. In December of that year, they performed for the first time in sixteen years at five venues in England, one a warm-up show in Nottingham, the other four supporting Cradle of Filth. The band continued to perform live around the world but did not release new material. After a show in November 2010, the band went on hiatus. In a January 2014 interview with Decibel, Sneap confirmed that Sabbat had once again split up.

== History ==
=== Early history (1985–1986) ===
The group originated in June 1985 with a band called Hydra, of which future Sabbat vocalist Martin Walkyier, bassist Frazer Craske, and guitarist Andy Sneap were members. Former Striptease and Fallen Angel drummer Simon Negus' replaced Mark Daley and original guitarist Adam Ferman joined. The band was renamed Sabbat.

Andy Sneap:

"Let me shed a bit of light on things here. Martin and Frazer had this band called Hydra back in 84/85. The most impressive thing about the band was the fact that Frazer had already printed some 2 colour t shirts and he had a car! I met Frazer at a local Hell gig in Long Eaton and it turned out they were thinking of getting a second guitarist. I heard a tape (which I still have, it's priceless) of a show they did in a pub in Nottingham and decided to have a jam as I was wanting to get some experience playing, after all I was the ripe old age of 15. Hell, two weeks after I joined, the original guitarist quit (i think this was in the cards) and the drummer left (thankfully) after we did our first demo a couple of months later, I think this was due to me having a go at his girlfriend in the studio (you see: good work ethic back then!) It was Tim Bowler (the drummer from Hell) who introduced us to Simon Negus. The name Sabbat came from a book on witchcraft but I actually found some old school books of mine with ideas doodled on them so I'm sure I had some doing in suggesting it. I do remember we liked the way the word looked in the scrawly type of writing so we went with it. Yeah the flexi disc for white dwarf was an odd one, John Blanche, the art editor painted our first cover so it all came about quite easy. It does sound shockingly bad though."

After rehearsing for nearly a year, they released the Fragments of a Faith Forgotten demo, which was well received and generated interest from record companies and a two-page spread in Kerrang! magazine.

Andy Sneap:

"Martin and Frazer were really into Venom, I was really into Mercyful Fate and Slayer. I remember the day we recorded Fragments Frazer had that Venom, Exodus and Slayer video from New York and we decided that's totally what we wanted to be doing.""We did Fragments of a Faith Forgotten on a little four track, we did it in two afternoons just threw it down. We didn't think much about it but off that we got a deal with Noise, two pages in Kerrang! and a Radio One session. It just snowballed. After the session the label were even more interested and then we got the Kerrang! cover after that."

After releasing a Warhammer-inspired flexi-disc on the front cover of White Dwarf magazine, the band signed with Noise Records in mid-1987; before then, Sneap was under 18 years of age and could not legally sign as an adult.

=== Further recognition (1987–1990) ===
In September 1987, the band travelled to Hanover, Germany to record their debut album, History of a Time to Come (1988). This generated much media attention amongst journalists and fans alike for its unique lyrical approach and its difference to the "Big 4" approach at the time during the 1980s metal scene.

The second album Dreamweaver (Reflections of Our Yesterdays) (1989), was a conceptual album, based on the book The Way of Wyrd, by Brian Bates. The album demonstrated Walkyier's deep-held beliefs in Wyrdism, Anglo-Saxon spirituality, Celtic mysticism and paganism.

Fraser Craske:

"Well, we made the decision after our European tour [to add a second guitarist]. We had taken Richard Scott with us on tour for the extra sound and it had really worked out great. But Richard said he wouldn't join us full time because he wanted to continue with his other band, but we had to get another guitarist because of the improvement in the sound."

The introduction of new guitarist "Jack Hammer" – Simon Jones – made a vast improvement on the guitar attack, as acknowledged by Andy Sneap, in his interview with Renee Ackerman of Rockworldtv at his back stage studios in 2007.

Jack, as he was known professionally prior to joining Sabbat, and indeed is still referred to as in the band, previously played in Holosade, and was brought in midway through the recording of Dreamweaver as a rhythm and lead guitarist to complement Sneap's contribution.

=== Breakup (1991–2000) ===
Tensions within the band began to mount, most of them revolved around money. The band were developing a very good following and selling a lot of merchandise, however they were victims of poor management and with a label (Noise) that did not seem to care what the band did. Martin Walkyier recalled:

"With the Noise contract, people were telling us 'Don't sign it,' but we did. Bands who were doing well at the time – Celtic Frost, Helloween, Kreator – were all on Noise. We had complete artistic freedom, but not for the right reasons. It was because they didn't give a flying fuck."

The band almost split up during the Dreamweaver sessions, but re-grouped to finalise the recording and move on and accept their differences. Andy Sneap observes with hindsight in interviews that it is great that he and Martin Walkyier were able to function within Sabbat again without arguing about money, musical direction and a feud he and Martin experienced.

Martin Walkyier:

"There are stories that I quit Sabbat because the rest of the band didn't like my pagan lyrics. That's not true. All of us shared an interest in paganism. The paganism was never a problem; I was always left to get on with the lyrics the best way I saw fit. No, the truth was that I could see that the music was going to get even more complex. Andy was writing 11 minute musical epics and I couldn't even begin to see how I'd write lyrics for something like that. I wanted to bring in other musical styles, to bring in violins for instance. That would never have worked with Sabbat."

Martin Walkyier commented in late 2006 that Sabbat were in severe financial distress in 1989 and that he was living on government state benefits, such was the stark financial situation the band faced. Walkyier commented that he felt that they were becoming "like Rush" due to the overtly technical nature and length of their songs – combined, these issues forced tensions within the band.

Martin Walkyier:

"All the things that went wrong with Sabbat in the old days were really nothing to do with me and Andy Sneap, even though we had our disagreements in the days when we were young. That was largely to do with record labels and management and things that were happening around us – the fact that we were selling hod-loads of records and not actually seeing any money at all and having to live on benefits at the time.

First to jump ship was guitarist Simon Jones during their 1989 UK Dreamweaver tour with British thrashers Xentrix supporting. He left the band only moments before the show at Sheffield University refectory on 15 November 1989, Sabbat did finish the show though with just Andy Sneap on guitar. Andy Sneap has stated that this was a drink related departure and Jones himself has said he regrets his departure in a recent video on Andy Sneap's Myspace site.

Guitarist Neil Watson was brought in for guitar duties, and with only two weeks to learn all of the tracks, appears on the live video The End of the Beginning. Walkyier left in 1990 along with Craske, with Walkyier going off to form Skyclad. Fraser Craske left the music industry completely at this time. Andy Sneap and Simon Negus overhauled the band and brought in vocalist Richie Desmond and bassist Wayne Banks. In 1991, they released Mourning Has Broken, but it did not go down well with fans or critics and the band performed a final show in Derby soon after, then shortly after, split up.

In Terrorizer (No. 152, Xmas 2006), Andy Sneap stated:

(Emphatically) "I don't listen to this (Mourning Has Broken). There is some mad guitar playing on there, some of the shredding is ridiculous, but it sounds thrown together, which is why it shouldn't have had the Sabbat name on it."

Simon Negus went on to join a band called the Glory Boys. Andy Sneap and Wayne Banks went on to form the group Godsend. Andy Sneap is now best known as a successful Grammy winning producer with over 100 albums produced at his Backstage Recording studios in rural Derbyshire.

=== Unofficial reunion (2001–2003) ===
Martin Walkyier initially wanted to re-form the band as Sabbat in 2001 with Fraser Craske and Simon Jones, however, this was blocked by Andy Sneap at the time.

Andy Sneap:

"The way I originally heard about (the reunion) was from one of the guys at Earache (Records), who called me up to ask me about it. I knew nothing about it so I called Martin to ask him about it. The conversation got a little heated and I explained they couldn't do it under the name SABBAT as both he and (bassist) Frazer quit, leaving me and (drummer) Simon (Negus) with a lot of debts and financial problems to clear up. This was the reason we carried on as SABBAT and did a third album. Obviously we wanted the new line up to work out but it didn't ... simple as that. What it came down to though was Simon Negus and myself, in theory, own the business and name as they left. If you left your employee, you couldn't go and start that business somewhere else under the same name."

Walkyier, Jones and Craske performed under the name Return to the Sabbat for 2001–2003, Skyclad drummer Jay Graham played on drums, after Simon Jones left (replaced by Andy Newby), the band continued for a while playing at Bloodstock indoor festival and a show in Camden, London after which Return to the Sabbat disbanded.

=== Official reunion (2006–2010) ===
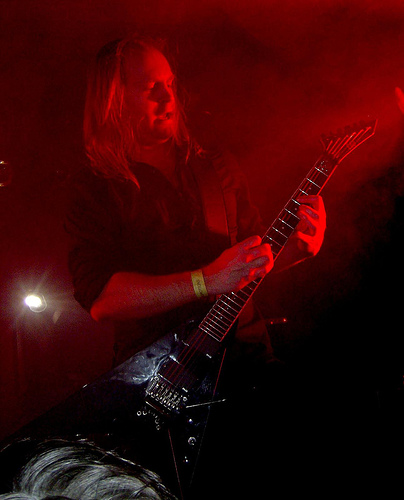
Andy Sneap live with Sabbat in 2007

In 2006, the band reunited with the Dreamweaver line-up to support Cradle of Filth on their UK tour in December 2006 at four different venues.

A warmup gig for this short tour was played at The Rig in Nottingham, England, on Saturday 16 December 2006, and as such was the first time since 1989 that the Dreamweaver line-up had played live together. They received much press attention and rave reviews for their support slot and confirmed that were to release their first two albums in a remastered format with additional bonus material.

They then performed at festivals such as the Keep It True Festival in Germany (April 2007) and the Day of Darkness festival in Ireland (July 2007).

Frazer Craske left Sabbat once again, for personal and work related reasons. He was replaced at the D.O.D. festival by Gizz Butt.

Simon Jones from official Sabbat website, January 2008:

"First up was the Keep It True Fest', southern Germany April 14th. If anyone can recall, spring 2007 was particularly warm and boy we sweated a few pounds off thrashing to a sold out venue. It was great to share the bill with Laaz Rocket and Diamond Head too. After this gig Frazer broke the news that he wouldn't be doing any more gigs. Gizz Butt would take his place from now on. There was no pressure laid on Frazer; it was his decision and the rest of us respected it, after all we had got back together to play metal and enjoy it. If it wasn't working for him then so be it. Miraculously Gizz breathed new life into Sabbat as a band and brought a new perspective to the songs."

Andy Sneap and Martin Walkyier said in interviews that the reunion was "a bit of fun" and there was no long term plan.

On 27 February 2007, Sabbat re-released History of a Time to Come and Dreamweaver. The re-releases feature new packaging, bonus live tracks, and a remastered sound. Sabbat's final album, 1991's Mourning Has Broken, was not re-released.

In 2010, the band went into hiatus, before finally splitting up once again. Inevitably, Martin and Andy were to fall out, once again, very publicly in a Facebook argument.

In a January 2014 interview with Decibel magazine, Andy Sneap confirmed that Sabbat were no more. One of the reasons for this break-up was reportedly a feud between Sneap and Walkyier.

Andy Sneap said in 2014 to the "Talking Bollocks" podcast, that Sabbat is over and he is happier in his current band, Hell, doing what he wants to do, and it is better if he and Martin "do their own thing." Sneap joined Judas Priest in February 2018 as a touring guitarist, filling in for Glenn Tipton, who had recently been diagnosed with Parkinson's disease.

== Musical style and lyrics ==
Sabbat were initially labelled as "thrash" and "satanic" in the Midlands metal scene. Fraser Craske: "We're not Satanists. It's more theatrical. We're interested in religion and philosophy and it follows that we write tracks about things like that." The band's early lyrics were "primarily Satanic or [...] influenced by the Occult in some way"; in Walkyier's interpretation, Satanism "doesn't say 'let's go out and kill people' or anything like that", referring to The Satanic Bible which has "nothing to do with sacrifice" but with a selfish outlook. Walkyier sees Satanism as a rebellion against orthodox Christianity. As he considers Satan and the Devil to be "in a lots of ways [...] a bogeyman invented by the Christians" to make people follow them, and "started to look more into the old religion of Europe [...], and that's sort of where my... my kind of personal beliefs lie really".

The late Dave G. Halliday was the singer/guitarist from the band Hell, the Derbyshire band who in the mid-1980s were a big influence upon and inspiration for Sabbat.

Andy Sneap:

"We are heavily influenced by Hell and don't mind admitting it" Andy says with obvious admiration. "The singer even taught me how to play guitar! We're not a deliberate copycat of Hell in any way though. They were a great band and it's a mystery to me why they never got anywhere. To be compared to them we don't mind in the least, we would take it more as an honour than anything. We've just done a charity show at Trent Poly dedicated to Hell's guitarist Dave Halliday who committed suicide in January. All the money went to his favourite charity, Cancer Research."

Martin Walkyier has left a fitting tribute to Dave G. Halliday within the sleeve notes of 2006 The Clan Destined release, In the Big Ending, which reads:

"These recordings are dedicated to the memory of Dave G Halliday. A man who was literally decades ahead of his time, but who tragically never had the chance to witness the enormous & positive influence he had upon the worldwide Metal scene. Whilst i still have breath in my body, you will never be forgotten."

== Line-up ==
=== Final line-up members ===
- Martin Walkyier – lead vocals (1985–1990, 2006–2010)
- Andy Sneap – guitar (1985–1991, 2006–2010)
- Simon Jones – guitar (1989–1990, 2006–2010)
- Gizz Butt – bass (2007–2010)
- Simon Negus – drums (1985–1991, 2006–2010)

=== Former members ===
- Fraser Craske – bass (1985–1990, 2006–2007)
- Neil Watson – guitar (1990–1991)
- Wayne Banks – bass (1990–1991)
- Richie Desmond – lead vocals (1990–1991)

=== Live members ===
- Richard Scott – guitar (1988)
- Kevin Bower – keyboards (2010)

== Discography ==
=== Albums ===
- History of a Time to Come (1988)
- Dreamweaver (Reflections of Our Yesterdays) (1989)
- Mourning Has Broken (1991)

=== Singles ===
- Blood for the Blood God (1987)
- Wildfire/The Best of Enemies (1989)

=== Split singles and compilation albums ===
- A Cautionary Tale/And the Brave Man Fails (split album with Vendetta) (1988)
- Doomsday News III – Thrashing East Live (Live) (1990)

=== Demos ===
- Magic in Practice and Theory (1985)
- BBC Sessions (1986)
- Fragments of a Faith Forgotten (1987)
- Stranger Than Fiction (1987)

=== Video ===
- The End of the Beginning (1990) VHS
- Keep It True 8 (2008) DVD
