= Dreamweaver (Sabbat album) =

Dreamweaver (Reflections of Our Yesterdays)

Studio album by Sabbat
- Released: 15 May 1989
- Recorded: January–March 1989
- Studio: Sky Trak Studio, Berlin, Germany
- Genre: Thrash metal, progressive metal
- Length: 44:05
- Label: Noise
- Producer: Roy M. Rowland, Karl-Ulrich Walterbach

Sabbat chronology
History of a Time to Come (1988)	Dreamweaver (Reflections of Our Yesterdays) (1989)	Mourning Has Broken (1991)

Professional ratings
Review scores
Source	Rating
AllMusic	4/5 stars
Collector's Guide to Heavy Metal	8/10
Kerrang!	4/5 stars
Metal Hammer	(10/10)
Rock Sound	(10/10)
Time Out (New York)	5/5 stars

Dreamweaver (Reflections of Our Yesterdays) is the second full-length album by the British thrash metal band Sabbat, released in 1989

Dreamweaver is a concept album based on the 1983 book by British psychologist Brian Bates - The Way of Wyrd: Tales of an Anglo-Saxon Sorcerer. The album demonstrated singer and lyricist Martin Walkyier's deep held beliefs in Wyrdism, Anglo-Saxon spirituality, Celtic mysticism and paganism. Musically the album reflected composer Andy Sneap's predilection at that time for increasingly lengthy and progressively technical thrash metal songs. Shortly before the album was recorded, former Holosade guitarist Simon Jones was recruited into the band as an additional lead and rhythm guitarist.

The album has come to be regarded as a classic of the thrash metal genre, described variously upon its re-release in 2007 as "essential listening" (Rock Sound), a "staggering work of total excellence" (Kerrang!), a "seminal chapter in the evolution of British metal" and one of the "finest metal albums ever made" (Metal Hammer).

== The Story of Dreamweaver ==
At the time of the album's release, lyricist Martin Walkyier spoke to the metal press about the story behind the concept album, including the magazines Kerrang! (No. 240, 27 May 1989) and Metal Forces (No. 39, May 1989).

=== "The Clerical Conspiracy" ===
"The Clerical Conspiracy" sets the scene for the story and themes to come, introducing us to Wat Brand, the Christian missionary from northern England who, a thousand years ago, is sent down to southern England to learn about the pagan ways of the southern Anglo-Saxons and in doing so determine the best way in which they can be converted to Christianity. Speaking to Kerrang!, Walkyier explained that in "The Clerical Conspiracy", "the monks are talking in an abbey in the north of England, discussing the best way of converting Pagans in the south to Christianity."

=== "Advent of Insanity" ===
Having accepted the quest, Wat Brand sets sail for the south of England, via the coast, and according to Martin Walkyier, "Advent of Insanity" depicts his thoughts during the journey, thinking about what he left behind and the perils that face him in the future… Did he do the right thing?"

=== "Do Dark Horses Dream of Nightmares?" ===
In "Do Dark Horses Dream of Nightmares?", Wat Brand has arrived at the South, and whilst waiting for his pre-arranged guide to arrive, falls asleep, during which he falls prey to nightmares during which the pagan spirits make first contact with him. According to Walkyier (speaking to Metal Forces), the spirits using this contact to "try to work out whether he is trying to destroy the old Gods… to impose the new religion upon them." Explaining the title of the song, Walkyier told Kerrang! that "one of the spirits he meets is a black horse's head on a totem pole in a clearing in the forest."

=== "The Best of Enemies" ===
In "The Best of Enemies", the morning after his nightmare, Brand finally meets his guide, Wulf, who tells him of the pagan ways and starts to rebuke his Christian ideas. Walkyier told Metal Forces magazine that Wulf tells Brand that "if he really wants to learn then he can't just tell him about the spirits and the spirit world, he has to encounter that for himself and has to meet the spirits face to face. He says that the spirits will give him all the knowledge he wants, but only if he has the conviction to go through with it. He has to actually risk his own death in meeting the spirits." Walkyier told Kerrang! that "Brand thinks that he [Wulf] is going to show him around. But Wulf is actually a Shaman priest."

=== "How Have the Mighty Fallen?" ===
Told from the perspective of the spirits, "How Have the Mighty Fallen?" describes Brand’s first real meeting with the spirits and makes plain their intention to fight for their survival notwithstanding the threat of their imminent replacement by Christianity. In his interview with Metal Forces, Walkyier said that "having been told of the preparations he must undergo before meeting the spirits, Brand deviates from this with the result that the spirits come too soon." Walkyier explained to Kerrang! that "at the end of the song they steal Brand's soul and he has to prepare himself for a journey into the spirit world to reclaim it." To Metal Forces, Walkyier stated that “He [Brand] has two days in which to recover his soul or his lifeforce will ebb out."

=== "Wildfire" ===
In "Wildfire", Brand journeys into the spirit world. Walkyier told Kerrang! that the title is a reference to Brand’s naked dance between two fires called 'Wildfires'.

=== "Mythistory" ===
In "Mythistory", as described by Walkyier to Metal Forces, Brand "encounters his own soul which is a woman. He doesn't know that he has met his own soul and tells the woman he has come to learn the way of the Wyrd and the power of nature. She tells him to look no further for she is his soul and on returning to the material world he will know anything he wanted to know." To Kerrang!, Walkyier elaborated that his soul "explains the way of Wyrd to him, everything that he wanted to know." Thus his mission to convert the Pagans has become instead "a voyage of self-discovery."

== Track listing ==
All lyrics are written by Martin Walkyier

No.	Title	Music	Length
1.	"The Beginning of the End (Intro)"	Andy Sneap	0:36
2.	"The Clerical Conspiracy"	Sneap	5:38
3.	"Advent of Insanity"	Sneap	2:27
4.	"Do Dark Horses Dream of Nightmares?"	Sneap	6:24
5.	"The Best of Enemies"	Sneap, Simon Jones	8:14
6.	"How Have the Mighty Fallen?"	Sneap, Jones	8:18
7.	"Wildfire"	Sneap	4:39
8.	"Mythistory"	Sneap, Jones	6:47
9.	"Happy Never After (Outro)"	Sneap	1:02
Total length:			44:05

=== 2007 re-release ===
On 19 February 2007 Dreamweaver was re-released by Sanctuary Records. The new edition features an expanded booket with extra photos and liner notes, remastered sound (undertaken by the band's own Andy Sneap), and three bonus live tracks, recorded in East Berlin in 1990:

10. "The Clerical Conspiracy" (live) – 6:04
11. "Do Dark Horses Dream of Nightmares?" (live) - 6:17
12. "The Best of Enemies" (live) – 8:05

== Personnel ==
Sabbat

- Martin Walkyier – vocals
- Andy Sneap – lead, rhythm and acoustic guitars
- Simon Jones – rhythm and lead guitar
- Frazer Craske – bass
- Simon Negus – drums and percussion

Production

- Roy M. Rowland – producer, engineer, mixing at Hansa Tonstudio, Berlin
- Moses Meister – mixing assistant
- Tim Beer – artwork
- Karl-Ulrich Walterbach – executive producer
