= Words from the Exit Wound =

Studio album by Napalm Death
- Released: 26 October 1998 (UK) 26 January 1999 (US)
- Recorded: June 1998
- Studios: Chapel Studios, Lincolnshire, United Kingdom
- Genres: Deathgrind; groove metal
- Length: 41:08
- Label: Earache
- Producer: Colin Richardson

Napalm Death chronology
Bootlegged in Japan (1998)	Words from the Exit Wound (1998)	Leaders Not Followers (1999)

Words from the Exit Wound is the eighth studio album by British extreme metal band Napalm Death, released in 1998 by Earache. It was issued only on CD. It is considered the final album of the band's "experimental" period, while simultaneously foreshadowing the band's return to a more traditional death metal and grindcore sound.

== Critical reception ==
Professional ratings
Review scores
Source	Rating
AllMusic	3/5 stars
Chronicles of Chaos	8/10
CMJ New Music Monthly	Favourable
Collector's Guide to Heavy Metal	7/10
The Encyclopedia of Popular Music	3/5 stars
MetalReviews	74/100
NME	6/10
SLUG	Favourable

Ian Christe of CMJ New Music Monthly praised the producer's work: "Richardson does an even more fantastic job than usual of presenting the musical subtlety and cleverness of compositions that could easily be lost behind an enormous wall of noise." About the singer he said: "Greenway assists more than usual, by stretching his voracious vocal scorch across a new range of tones."

== Track listing ==
No.	Title	Lyrics	Music	Length
1.	"The Infiltraitor"	Mark Greenway	Shane Embury	4:30
2.	"Repression out of Uniform"	Greenway	Jesse Pintado	2:53
3.	"Next of Kin to Chaos"	Embury	Mitch Harris	4:08
4.	"Trio-Degradable / Affixed by Disconcern"	Affixed by Disconcern: Harris	Trio: Greenway, Embury, Harris, Pintado, Danny Herrera, Affixed by Disconcern: Harris	4:34
5.	"Cleanse Impure"	Greenway	Pintado	3:14
6.	"Devouring Depraved"	Embury	Embury	3:22
7.	"Ulterior Exterior"	Greenway	Embury	1:50
8.	"None the Wiser?"	Greenway	Pintado, Embury, Harris	4:16
9.	"Clutching at Barbs"	Greenway	Embury	2:27
10.	"Incendiary Incoming"	Greenway	Harris	3:08
11.	"Thrown Down a Rope"	Greenway	Harris	3:25
12.	"Sceptic in Perspective"	Embury	Embury	3:24

U.S. release bonus tracks (from 1998 live album Bootlegged in Japan)
No.	Title	Lyrics	Music	Length
13.	"Hung (Live)"	Embury, Greenway	Harris, Embury	3:57
14.	"Greed Killing (Live)"	Embury, Harris	Harris	3:00
15.	"Suffer the Children (Live)"	Greenway	Mick Harris	4:10

== Personnel ==
=== Napalm Death ===
- Mark "Barney" Greenway – vocals
- Jesse Pintado – guitar
- Mitch Harris – guitar
- Shane Embury – bass
- Danny Herrera – drums

=== Technical personnel ===
- Colin Richardson – production
- Ewan Davies – assistant engineering
- Guy Davie – mastering
- Matt Cannon – photography
- Graham Humphreys – design
