= Bootlegged in Japan =

Live album by Napalm Death
- Released: 22 June 1998
- Recorded: 5 August 1996
- Genre: Deathgrind
- Length: 71:12
- Label: Earache
- Producer: Napalm Death

Napalm Death chronology
Breed to Breathe (1997)	Bootlegged in Japan (1998)	Words from the Exit Wound (1998)

Professional ratings
Review scores
Source	Rating
AllMusic	3/5 stars
Chronicles of Chaos	8/10
Collector's Guide to Heavy Metal	4/10
The Encyclopedia of Popular Music	2/5 stars

Bootlegged in Japan is a live album from British extreme metal band Napalm Death, released in June 1998 through Earache.

== Background ==
The album features a concert from 5 August 1996 at the Liquid Rooms, Tokyo. It was recorded as a bootleg and after the band received the recording, they found it was good enough to release it as an actual and official live album. In the inlay of the album the band wrote:

The official release of this album was prompted by the fact that we found anonymous bootleg tapes of the '96 Tokyo show coming from Japan, and felt that the recording captured the true uncompromising live spirit of Napalm Death.

— Napalm Death, Bootlegged in Japan (inlay). Napalm Death. Nottingham: Earache. 1998.

== Release ==
Bootlegged in Japan was part of a 3-CD set together with the album Diatribes and the EP Greed Killing Earache re-released in 2010.

== Track listing ==
No.	Title	Lyrics	Music	Length
1.	"Antibody"	Mark Greenway	Shane Embury	3:21
2.	"My Own Worst Enemy"	Embury	Embury	3:25
3.	"More Than Meets the Eye"	Greenway	Embury	3:18
4.	"Hung"	Embury, Greenway	Mitch Harris, Embury	3:57
5.	"Greed Killing"	Embury, Mitch Harris	Harris	3:00
6.	"Suffer the Children"	Greenway	Mick Harris	4:07
7.	"Mass Appeal Madness"	Greenway	Mitch Harris, Embury	3:31
8.	"Cursed to Crawl"	Embury	Embury	2:59
9.	"Glimpse into Genocide"	Embury	Jesse Pintado	2:47
10.	"I Abstain"	Greenway	Pintado	3:33
11.	"Lucid Fairytales"			1:12
12.	"Plague Rages"	Embury	Embury	3:43
13.	"Cold Forgiveness"	Embury	Mitch Harris, Pintado	3:58
14.	"Control"	Nicholas Bullen, Justin Broadrick	Bullen, Broadrick, Mick Harris	1:33
15.	"Diatribes"	Greenway	Embury, Mitch Harris	3:55
16.	"Life?"	Jim Whitely	Lee Dorrian, Whitely, Bill Steer, Mick Harris	1:16
17.	"Siege of Power"	Bullen, Broadrick	Bullen, Broadrick, Mick Harris	4:16
18.	"If the Truth Be Known"	Embury, Greenway	Embury	4:06
19.	"Unchallenged Hate"			2:14
20.	"Nazi Punks Fuck Off" (Dead Kennedys cover)	Jello Biafra	Biafra	1:26
21.	"From Enslavement to Obliteration"			1:37
22.	"The Kill"	Bullen, Broadrick	Bullen, Broadrick, Mick Harris	0:32
23.	"Scum"	Bullen, Broadrick	Bullen, Broadrick, Mick Harris	2:55
24.	"Ripe for the Breaking"	Greenway	Mitch Harris, Embury	4:39

== Personnel ==
=== Napalm Death ===
- Mark "Barney" Greenway – lead vocals
- Jesse Pintado – guitar
- Mitch Harris – guitar
- Shane Embury – bass
- Danny Herrera – drums
