= Scourge (album) =

Studio album by Xentrix
- Released: 1996
- Recorded: 1995–1996
- Genre: Groove metal, thrash metal
- Length: 52:34
- Label: Heavy Metal Records
- Producer: Mark Stuart

Xentrix chronology
Kin (1992)	Scourge (1996)	Bury the Pain (2019)

Professional ratings
Review scores
Source	Rating
Rock Hard	7/10

Scourge is the fourth studio album by British thrash metal band Xentrix. It was released in 1996 through Heavy Metal Records. It is the only album to feature vocalist Simon Gordon and guitarist Andy Rudd, and their final one with bassist Paul "Macka" MacKenzie. The album goes into a more groove metal style that was very popular at the time. It was Xentrix's final studio album for more than two decades, until the release of Bury the Pain in 2019.

== Track listing ==
All songs written by Xentrix.

No.	Title	Length
1.	"13 Years"	6:01
2.	"Scourge"	5:21
3.	"Incite"	3:22
4.	"Caught You Living"	3:41
5.	"Strength of Persuasion"	6:07
6.	"Never Be"	4:26
7.	"The Hand That Feeds Itself"	5:06
8.	"Blood Nation"	6:59
9.	"Creed"	4:45
10.	"Breathe"	6:46
Total length:		52:34

== Personnel ==
Xentrix

- Simon Gordon – vocals
- Andy Rudd – rhythm guitar
- Dennis Gasser – drums
- Paul "Macka" MacKenzie – bass
- Kristian "Stan" Havard – lead guitar

Production

- Mark Freshney – cover art
- Mark Stuart – producer, engineering, mixing
- Huw Lloyd-Jones – cover art
- Martin Talbot – band photos

== External sites ==
- Xentrix – Scourge
