= Race Against Time (band) =

English heavy metal band

- Origin: Chesterfield, Matlock and Nottingham, England
- Genre: Heavy metal
- Years active: 1978–1982
- Label: High Roller Records
- Members: Dave G. Halliday; Al Short; Geoff Green

Race Against Time were an English heavy metal band from Derbyshire, formed in 1978 along with Paralex and Radium, who referred to themselves as the 'East Midlands Bands Cooperative'. These bands shared equipment and organised concerts, helping Nottingham to become a hotbed of activity during the new wave of British heavy metal.

They were progressive but with a heavy, doom influenced sound and were regarded as very professional musicians. They wore a kind of proto-corpsepaint with black clothing.

== Biography ==
Race Against Time initially formed in 1978 between Chesterfield and Matlock, England. Al Short had played in two bands simultaneously, called Captain Hippo and Heavy Water. He noticed an advert in a music shop window placed by Dave Halliday, whose previous band Skint had recently broken up. Initially they were a four piece, with Halliday on guitar, but as more songs were written he slowly took over on vocals and the band became a three piece. They tried a number of drummers before finding Geoff Green.

Following being let down by a record label who pulled out of releasing "Bedtime" as a single with two B sides at the last minute, they were approached by Nigel Burnham, a journalist who was creating the New Electric Warriors compilation album with Logo Records. The proposed A side of the single is the final track on the album. Unable to regain record label attention, the band decided to split following a session aired on Trevor Dann's BBC Radio Nottingham Rock Show. The band Hell was formed with members of the aforementioned 'East Midlands Bands Cooperative', guitarist Kev Bower and bassist Tony Speakman from Paralex and drummer Tim Bowler from Overdrive. Halliday used some Race Against Time material in this new outfit.

In 2015 Al Short and Geoff Green reunited with Radium members Kevin Healey and Andy Meehan to play the songs of both bands at Brofest in Newcastle. The release of their Time Waits For No Man compilation on High Roller Records coincided with this performance.

== Musical style ==
Race against time are best described as a new wave of British heavy metal band, although they played a darker form of blues that was weeded out of their sound when they evolved into Hell.

== Band members ==
- Dave G. Halliday - vocals, guitar (1978–1982)
- Al Short - bass (1978–1982)
- Geoff Green - drums (1978–1982)

== Discography ==
=== Studio albums ===
- Time Waits for No Man (2015)

=== Compilation albums ===
- New Electric Warriors (1980) with the song "Bedtime"

== See also ==
- List of new wave of British heavy metal bands
