= History of a Time to Come =

- Cover art by John Blanche

Studio album by Sabbat
- Released: 15 January 1988
- Recorded: September 1987
- Studio: Horus Sound Studio, Hannover, Germany
- Genre: Thrash metal
- Length: 46:24
- Label: Noise
- Producer: Roy M. Rowland

Sabbat chronology
History of a Time to Come (1988)	Dreamweaver (1989)

Professional ratings
Review scores
Source	Rating
AllMusic	4.5/5 stars
Collector's Guide to Heavy Metal	7/10
Kerrang!	5/5 stars
Metal Forces	(99/100)
Metal Hammer	10/10 stars
Rock Sound	10/10 stars

History of a Time to Come is the debut full-length album by the British thrash metal band Sabbat.

== Background ==
In May 1986, Sabbat recorded a four-track demo tape entitled Fragments of a Faith Forgotten, recorded at a cost of £10 in a converted farmhouse near Ripley, Derbyshire. During the second half of 1986, guitarist Andy Sneap distributed the demo tape to magazines and several heavy metal record labels, including Berlin-based recording company Noise Records. After hearing it, Noise Records expressed interest in the band and asked to hear more material. The demo tape was also sent to Tommy Vance of BBC Radio 1's Friday Rock Show, to see if he would review it in his column for Metal Hammer magazine. Vance was so impressed he offered the band a recording session for his radio show.

On 6 February 1987, the band recorded three songs live in the studio at the BBC's Maida Vale Studios, London, for the Friday Rock Show, which was broadcast on 27 February 1987.

Prompted by Noise Records's request to hear more material, a copy of the BBC session was duly provided to the record company. Shortly afterwards, in March 1987, the German label offered the band a recording contract, which the band accepted, albeit the contract could not be signed until Sneap (the youngest member of the band) turned 18 years old in July 1987. Immediately plans were put in place to record the band's debut LP at Horus Sound Studio in Hannover, Germany, in September 1987.

Before heading to Germany, the band was contacted by John Blanche, art director for White Dwarf magazine, who proposed that the band record a song for release as a free flexi disc to accompany the magazine. The band agreed, and the song "Blood for the Blood God" was recorded in August 1987 and released as intended with the magazine in November 1987.

== Writing and composition ==
Speaking to Metal Forces magazine before the recording of the album, Sneap set out the band's plans for their debut LP, stating:

"All the tracks from the 'Fragments of a Faith Forgotten' demo will be on it and also 'The 13th Disciple' from the Friday Rock Show session, plus other tracks such as 'A Church Bizarre', 'I for an Eye', 'Behind the Crooked Cross' and the instrumental 'A Dead Man's Robe'".

=== Song contents ===
"A Cautionary Tale"

One of the band's oldest songs, "A Cautionary Tale" was recorded for the demo tape Fragments of a Faith Forgotten in May 1986 and was also recorded by the band for its BBC radio session in February 1987. The song is based on the classic German tale of the scholar Faust who makes a bargain with the devil's representative Mephistopheles which permits Faust to enjoy the devil's powers but ultimately in an exchange for Faust's soul which sees Faust eternally damned.

"Hosanna in Excelsis"

This is another early Sabbat song which was first recorded for the demo tape Fragments of a Faith Forgotten in May 1986. Speaking to Metal Hammer magazine after the recording of the album, lyricist Martin Walkyier explained that "Hosanna in Excelsis" describes "the last fight between Heaven and Hell and is based on the bible", referring to the subject matter of the Book of Revelation. The title of the song is a reference to part of the Sanctus hymn which traditionally forms the fourth part of a mass in classical music.

"Behind the Crooked Cross"

One of the band's more recently composed songs at the time of the recording of the album, "Behind the Crooked Cross" is based upon themes raised in historian and biographer Gerald Suster’s book, Hitler and the Age of Horus. The book includes an exploration of Adolf Hitler’s mystical and occult influences, positing a connection between philosophies expounded by Aleister Crowley, namely, the rise of Nazism as evidence of the fulfillment of Crowley’s prophecy of the imminent Age of Horus. This exploration includes a consideration of Nazi symbolism, represented most potently by the Swastika, or 'crooked cross'. Speaking to Metal Forces magazine before the album’s recording, Walkyier stated that the song addresses "the question was Hitler a madman or a magician?... I think he was obviously a madman." The song also mentions the Russian occultist, philosopher, and author Helena Blavatsky.

"Horned Is the Hunter"

In February 1987, Sabbat's BBC session had included a song called "The 13th Disciple". For the album, the music for this song was given new lyrics, and entitled "Horned Is the Hunter". Reflective of Walkyier's burgeoning interest in paganism at that time, the song bemoans the fate of paganism, symbolically represented by the horned ruler Pan, following the arrival into Western Europe of Christianity.

"I for an Eye"

Another newer song at the time of recording, "I for an Eye" tells the biblical story of the fallen angel, Lucifer.

"For Those Who Died"

The third of the older songs which had first been recorded for the demo tape Fragments of a Faith Forgotten in May 1986, "For Those Who Died" had also been recorded by the band for its BBC radio session in February 1987. Speaking to Metal Hammer shortly after the recording of the album, Walkyier stated that "'For Those Who Died' is about the inquisition in the Middle Ages." In particular the song addresses the Catholic Church’s persecution during the Medieval Inquisition of those it considered guilty of heresy.

"The Church Bizarre"

Speaking to Kerrang! shortly before the album's release, bassist Frazer Craske explained that he and Walkyier had attended a sermon by evangelist Billy Graham. Craske described Graham "as an extremely dangerous American who makes his living spreading the word of God." Martin Walkyier stated that "I went with an open mind… but what put me off was all those millions of people watching him and he's standing there with a massive stage-show and loads of money. If that is what his religion's about, then I don't want anything to do with it. It was really centred on money." This disillusionment is apparent in the lyrics of "The Church Bizarre", a cynical story of evangelism and its pursuit of material gain.

== Recording and release ==
The album was recorded at Horus Sound Studio commencing on 14 September 1987. It was subsequently mixed in Berlin by producer Roy M. Rowland and released in 1988, bearing artwork drawn by the band's White Dwarf contact, John Blanche, entitled 22Horned Is the Hunter.

== Track listing ==
All tracks are written by Andy Sneap and Martin Walkyier, except "Intro" and "A Dead Man's Robe" by Sneap.

No.	Title	Length
1.	"Intro"	2:00
2.	"A Cautionary Tale"	4:15
3.	"Hosanna in Excelsis"	4:00
4.	"Behind the Crooked Cross"	6:00
5.	"Horned Is the Hunter"	8:08
6.	"I for an Eye"	5:22
7.	"For Those Who Died"	6:25
8.	"A Dead Man's Robe"	4:48
9.	"The Church Bizarre"	5:07
Total length:		46:24

2007 re-release bonus tracks

On February 19, 2007, History of a Time to Come was re-released. The new edition features an expanded booklet with extra photos and liner notes, a remastered sound (done by the band's own Andy Sneap), and five bonus live tracks, recorded in East Berlin in 1990:

10. "Hosanna in Excelsis" (live)
11. "Behind the Crooked Cross" (live)
12. "I for an Eye" (live)
13. "For Those Who Died" (live)
14. "The Church Bizarre" (live)

== Personnel ==
Sabbat

- Martin Walkyier – vocals
- Andy Sneap – lead guitar
- Frazer Craske – bass
- Simon Negus – drums

Production

- Roy M. Rowland – producer, engineer
- Steve "The Rock" Rispin – engineer
- John Blanche – artwork
