= Breed to Breathe =

EP by Napalm Death
- Released: 17 November 1997
- Recorded: 1997
- Studio: Framework Studios, Lincoln, England
- Genre: Deathgrind; groove metal
- Length: 19:02
- Label: Earache
- Producer: Colin Richardson

Napalm Death chronology
Inside the Torn Apart (1997)	Breed to Breathe (1997)	Bootlegged in Japan (1998)

Professional ratings
Review scores
Source	Rating
Chronicles of Chaos	8/10
Collector's Guide to Heavy Metal	6/10
In Music We Trust	Favorable

Breed to Breathe is an EP by English extreme metal band Napalm Death, released in 1997 through Earache on CD.

== Release ==
The album is printed as CD Extra and contains a data track which features the video clip for the song "Breed to Breathe" and other band-related content such as a discography and a band history. Due to the depiction of graphic material the video clip prompted the Freiwillige Selbstkontrolle der Filmwirtschaft, the German motion picture rating system organization, to ban it in Germany and even to obtain a court decision that declared the clip illegal. Many media around the world also refused to feature the clip.

Both bands that deliver a Napalm Death song on the sixth track are winners of a demo cover version competition that Napalm Death had launched in summer 1997 and limited to bands without a recording contract.

== Track listing ==
No.	Title	Lyrics	Music	Length
1.	"Breed to Breathe"	Shane Embury	Embury	3:15
2.	"All Intensive Purposes"	Mitch Harris	Harris	3:23
3.	"Stranger Now"	Embury	Harris, Embury	3:47
4.	"Bled Dry"	Embury	Jesse Pintado	2:21
5.	"Time Will Come"	Embury	Harris	3:22

US release
No.	Title	Lyrics	Music	Length
6.	"Greed Killing" (Performed by Impending Doom)	Embury, Harris	Harris	2:54

European release
No.	Title	Lyrics	Music	Length
6.	"Suffer the Children" (Performed by Fatality)	Mark Greenway	Harris	4:34

== Personnel ==
=== Napalm Death ===
- Mark "Barney" Greenway – vocals
- Jesse Pintado – guitar
- Mitch Harris – guitar
- Shane Embury – bass
- Danny Herrera – drums

=== Technical personnel ===
- Colin Richardson – production
- Paul Siddens – recording
- Andy Sneap – mixing
- Tony Wooliscroft – band photograph
- Antz White – design, layout
- Graham Humphreys – design, layout
- Scalp – multimedia construction
