= Hell (British band) =

English heavy metal band

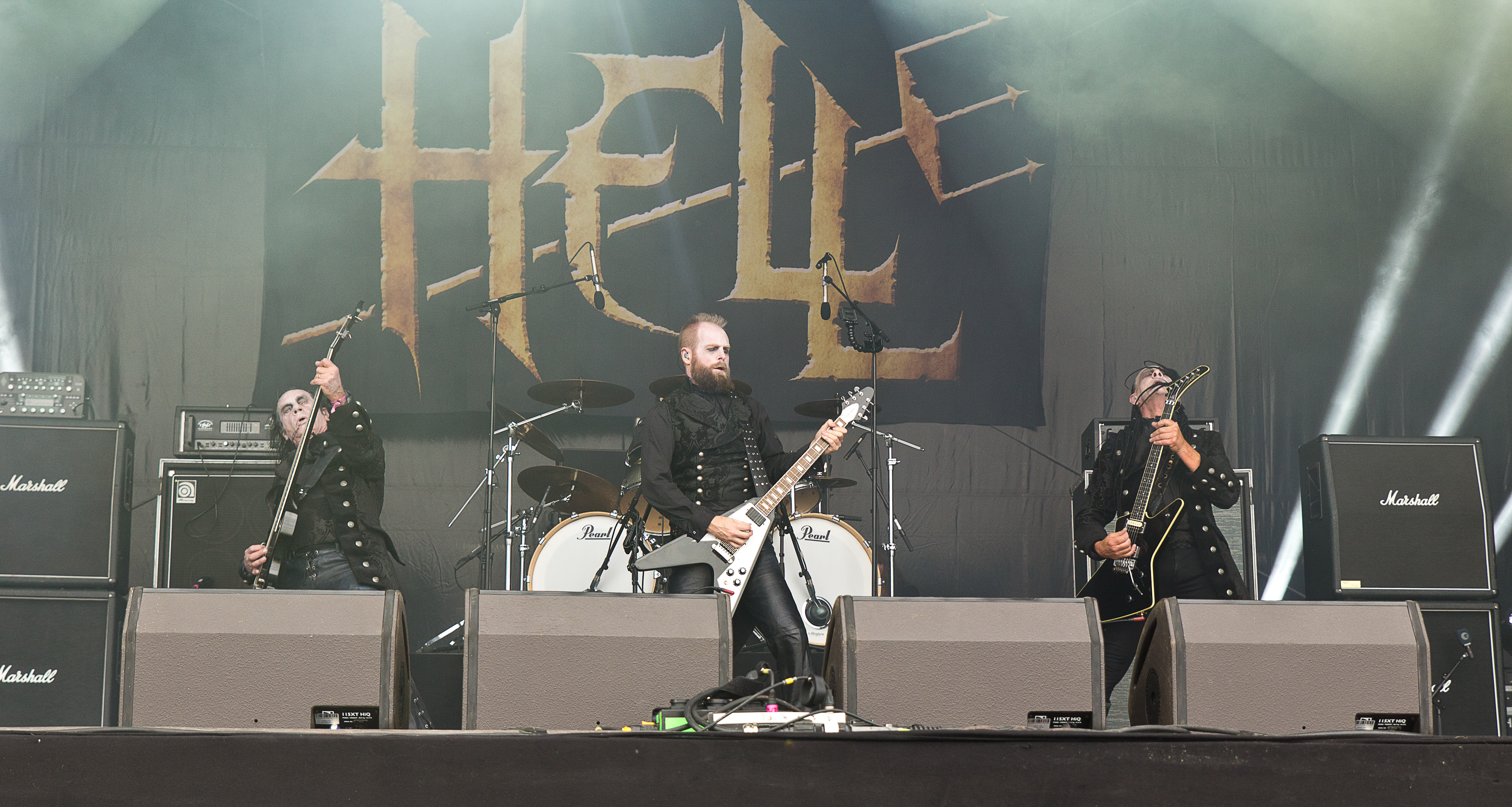
- Hell at Rockharz Open Air 2015 in Germany

Background information
- Origin: Nottingham, England
- Genre: Heavy metal
- Years active: 1982–1987, 2008-present
- Label: Nuclear Blast
- Members: Tony Speakman; Tim Bowler; Kev Bower; Andy Sneap; David Bower
- Past members: Dave G. Halliday; Sean Kelley
- Website: hell-metal.com

Hell are an English heavy metal band from Derbyshire, formed in 1982 from the remaining members of bands Race Against Time and Paralex. Due to a series of unfortunate and tragic events, the band originally folded in 1987. They were amongst the first bands to wear proto-corpse paint as part of their stage show, which featured hysterical ranting from a gargoyle-adorned pulpit, along with the use of a pyrotechnic exploding Bible which caused outrage amongst the clergy when it originally appeared in 1983.

Although they were largely ignored by the media and record companies in the 1980s, their music became known through the underground tape trading phenomenon, and the band achieved a degree of cult status. In 2008 they reunited, and were signed by Nuclear Blast. Their first full-length album, Human Remains, was released in May 2011. The album topped at No. 46 on the German album chart in its first week of release.

== History ==
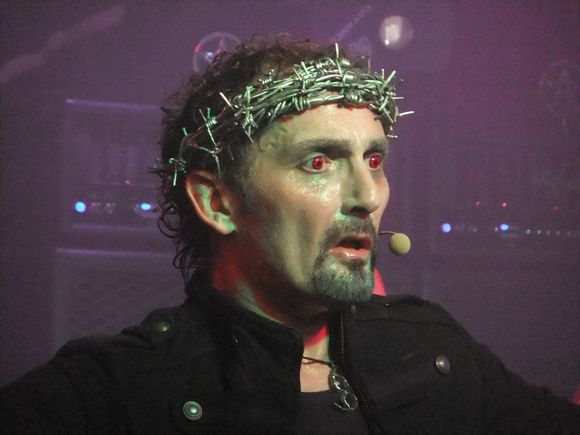
Vocalist David Bower performing at the MFN club in Nottingham

=== Early years (1982–1987) ===
Hell was founded in Derbyshire in 1982.

They signed to the Belgian label Mausoleum Records, but two weeks prior to the recording of their debut album, the label collapsed into bankruptcy. Guitarist Kev Bower subsequently quit the band. He was briefly replaced by Sean Kelley, though Hell split up soon afterwards, which led to the suicide of vocalist Dave Halliday by carbon monoxide poisoning.

Dave Halliday taught Andy Sneap (later to form heavy metal band Sabbat) to play guitar and Sneap mentions Hell as one of his main influences. Sneap went on to become a world-renowned record producer, with over 100 albums and a Swedish Grammy Award to his credit, and a touring guitarist for Judas Priest.

=== Reformation (2008–2011) ===
The remaining original members of Hell reunited in 2008 to finally record their album which was entitled Human Remains. Sabbat members Martin Walkyier and Andy Sneap agreed to play on the album to replicate Dave Halliday's vocals and guitar tracks respectively, with Sneap also acting as the producer. Although Walkyier spent a few evenings (not the "several months" he often claims in frequent social media rants) recording test vocals for various songs on the album, this process was halted once it became clear that his vocal style and somewhat acerbic temperament were unsuitable for the task. Kev Bower's brother David (who is known as David Beckford in his career as a stage and television actor) was invited to do a voiceover for the song "Plague And Fyre" and then joined the band as lead vocalist, re-recording all the lead vocal parts. Sneap also joined the band as a permanent member.

=== 2011 ===
The new line-up played their first gig at the MFN club in Nottingham on 20 May 2011, playing songs from Human Remains and also Race Against Time's "Bedtime" as a tribute to David Halliday. This was followed by a run of festival shows in Europe and the UK, including Metalfest Open Airs in Switzerland, Germany and Austria, Rockstad Falun in Sweden, the UK's Download Festival, Tuska Open Air Metal Festival in Finland, Summer Breeze Open Air in Germany, and Bloodstock Open Air in the UK, for which they received the "2011 Best Mainstage Performance" vote. The band then performed on the Sweden Rock Cruise, and closed out 2011 by having Human Remains being awarded Sweden Rock Magazine's "2011 Album of the Year", as well as attaining position No. 6 in the Metal Hammer "Best of 2011" list. The album also attained "Best of 2011" accolades on many internet webzines, as well as being nominated "2011 Album of the Year" on the Bloodstock Open Air user forum.

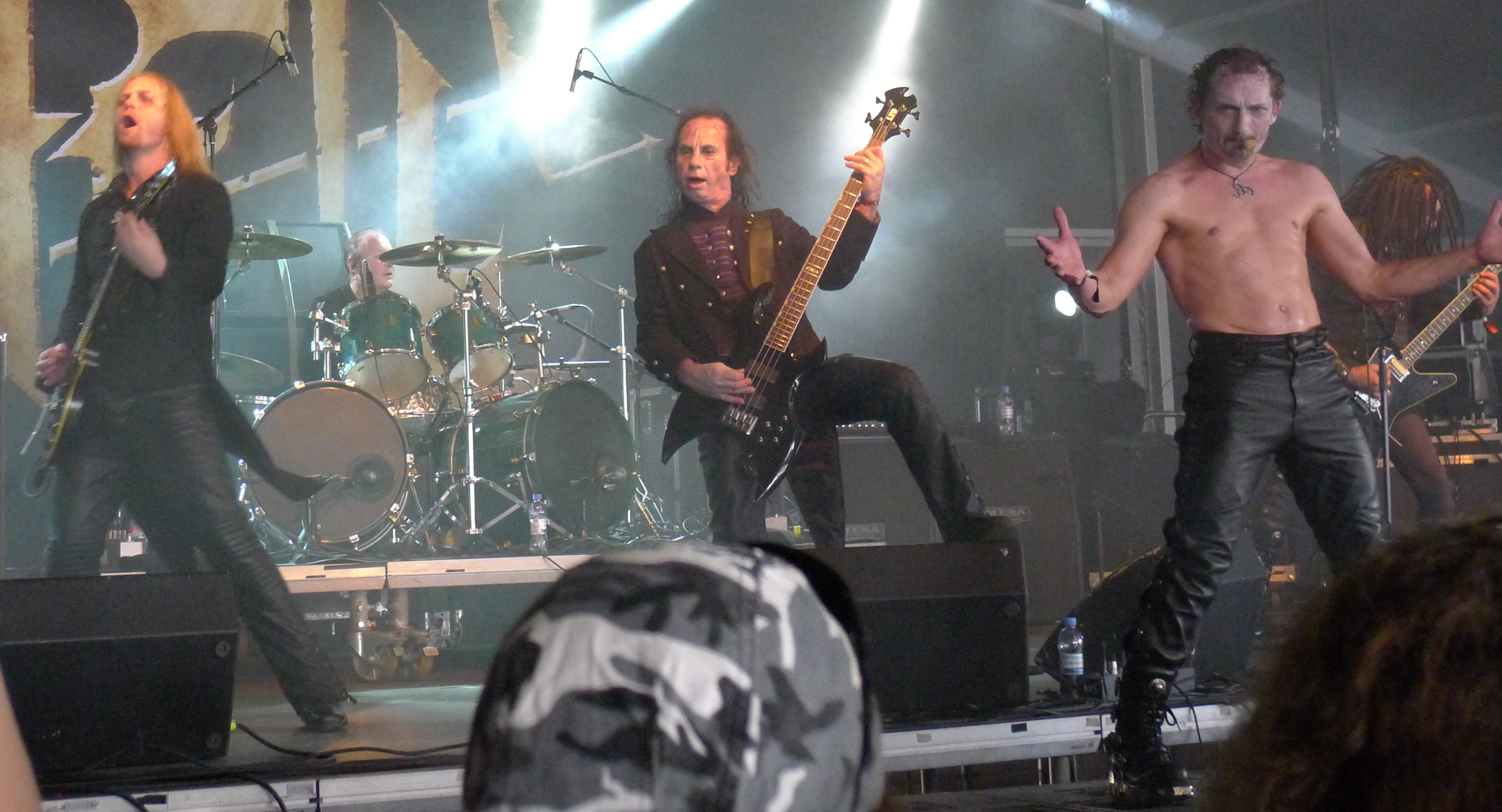
Hell at Tuska Open Air 2011

=== 2012 ===
Hell opened their 2012 show run with a mainstage appearance at the Hammerfest in Prestatyn, North Wales. This was followed by the band gaining a prestigious support slot with Accept for the whole of their "Stalingrad" European tour, which started at Le Bataclan in Paris on 6 April. The band were also nominated for a Metal Hammer Golden Gods Awards in the magazine's "Metal As F*ck" category. Numerous additional European shows were also played, including the Rock Hard Festival at the German Gelsenkirchen Amphitheatre, with this show being filmed and subsequently broadcast by WDR TV on the long-running Rockpalast mainstream TV show. Scandinavian shows included headlining appearances at the Muskelrock and Metal Magic festivals in Sweden and Denmark respectively, along with a Sweden Stage appearance at the Sweden Rock Festival. The band also featured in the July 2012 issue of the UK's Metal Hammer magazine, in which they appeared in a three-page article. Hell's 2012 tour run also included their first shows in Eastern Europe at the Masters of Rock festival in the Czech Republic and Metalcamp in Slovenia, along with appearances at the Alcatraz (BE), Zwarte Cross (NL), and into The Grave (NL) festivals. They closed out the year with headlining appearances in Dublin (IRE), a town festival at Molins de Rei near Barcelona (ES), and played their final show of 2012 at Rommelrock in Maasmechelen (BE), thus completing the Human Remains tour run which had taken the band to 16 different countries. Hell also entered the studio late in the year to commence work on the follow-up album to Human Remains.

=== 2013 ===
By the beginning of 2013, Kev Bower and Andy Sneap had completed demo recordings for the majority of songs which would appear on the band's second album, with recording proper set to commence in the spring. Since no early demo recordings were this time available to fill a bonus disc, the band elected to record a live DVD as a bonus complement to the album, and this was shot and recorded at the band's first 2013 show at Derby Assembly Rooms (UK) on 23 February. The sell out event also unveiled the band's full Church of Hell stage set and pyrotechnic show, with fans travelling from 13 different countries to attend.

The band played a headline show at the R-Mine Metalfest (BE) and also appeared at Turock Open Air (DE), Hammer Open Air (FIN), Bang Your Head Open Air (DE) and made a return mainstage appearance at Bloodstock Open Air as one of the most heavily requested bands on the BOA user forum, and once again won the "Best Mainstage Performance" vote. It was later discovered that technical problems with the DVD recording at Derby had made some material unsalvageable, so additional footage was added from the band's appearance at this festival.

It was announced in August that the second album would be entitled Curse and Chapter. To coincide with the album release, Hell were announced as being principal support for Amon Amarth and Carcass on the whole of their extensive European tour, taking in 25 shows in 13 countries, opening in Oberhausen (DE) on 7 November.

=== 2014 ===
The first three months of 2014 saw the band on a temporary hiatus as Andy Sneap had production commitments in the US with Accept and Exodus. The first large-scale show of 2014 was announced as being at Hyde Park in London, playing alongside Black Sabbath. The band played a warm-up show to this event at The Rescue Rooms in Nottingham. Following a main slot at the Leyendas Del Rock event in Alicante (ES) and a W.E.T.Stage appearance the 2014 Wacken Open Air festival, Andy Sneap and Kev Bower took to the saddle for charity on behalf of the band, participating in a 260 km cycle ride from London to Download Festival to raise money for the NSPCC, the Teenage Cancer Trust and Nordoff Robbins. The band played a run of shows in Europe supporting Kreator and Arch Enemy, immediately followed by a UK tour supporting Saxon throughout November and December. On the eve of the show at Newcastle 02 Academy, however, Saxon's drummer Nigel Glockler was rushed to hospital with a brain aneurysm, resulting in the last five shows being postponed until February 2015.

=== 2015 ===
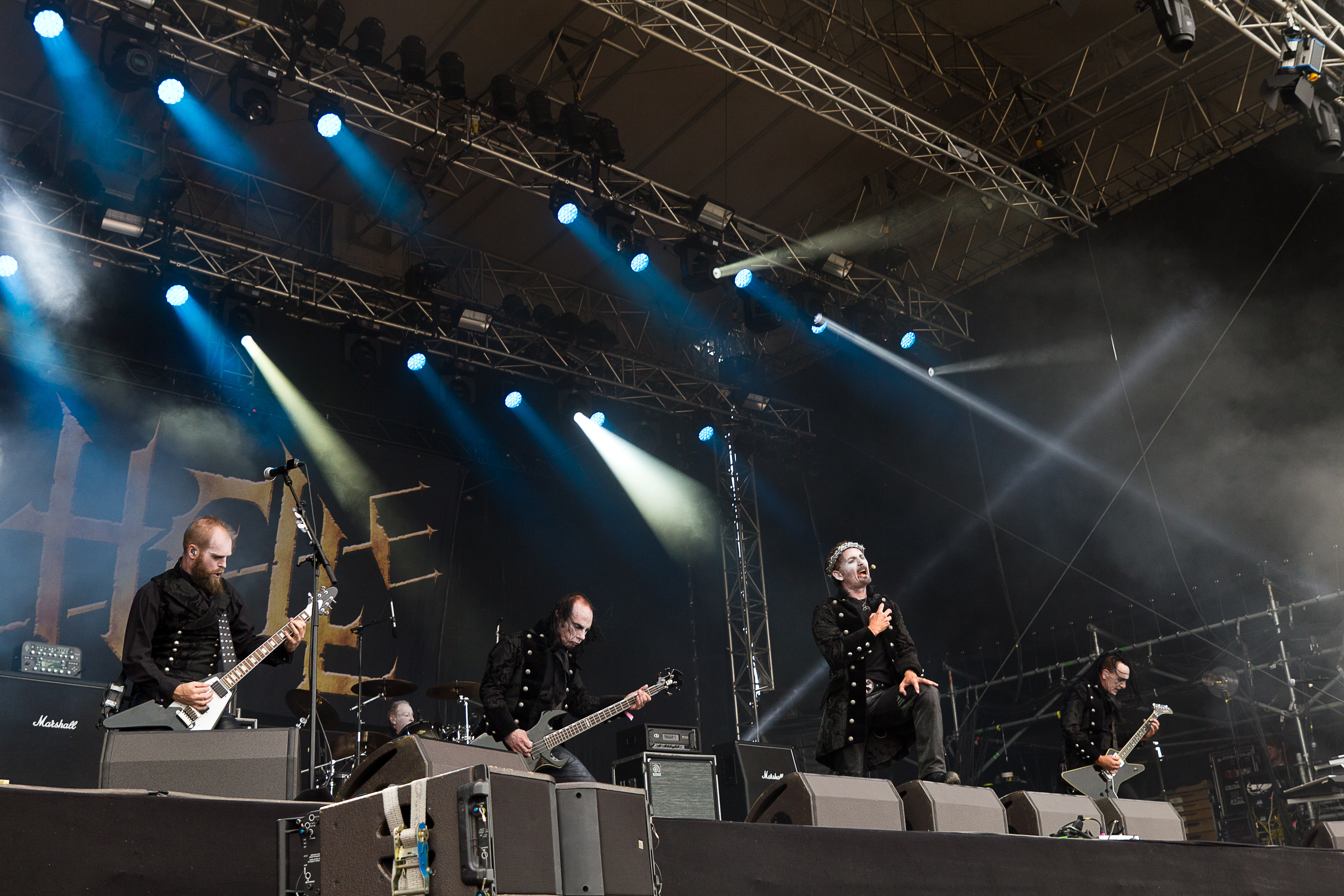
Hell performing in 2015

After completing the rescheduled run of shows with Saxon, the band made an additional UK appearance as special mainstage guests at Hammerfest 2015. This was an especially difficult show to complete, since Kev Bower was temporarily resident in Spain at the hospital bedside of his sick father, flying in for the show with almost no time to spare, and then having to leave again immediately afterwards. Once his father had recovered and was repatriated, the band then continued touring work throughout Europe, playing headline shows in Belgium, Holland and Germany, including headlining festival appearances at events including Metalheadz Open Air in Oberndorf, at which they used a rare opportunity to use the full stage show and pyrotechnic production. The band also made a return visit to the Sweden Rock Festival and played mainstage at Rockharz Open Air in Germany. On 5 August 2015 the band announced that after their penultimate live show of 2015 in Finland (Jalometalli), they would be starting work on their third studio album. The band closed out 2015 by accepting an invitation from their 2012 touring companions Accept to provide a special guest appearance at the London Forum on 7 December.

=== 2016 ===
The first three months of 2016 were spent almost exclusively in the studio, writing and rehearsing new material for the forthcoming album. This live-work hiatus was also created by the fact that for the third time in their career, the band found themselves signed to a booking agent who had then failed to secure any work for the band. This situation was resolved in March, when Hell joined the roster of Loudnoise Productions based in Holland.

=== Where are they now? ===
Currently, David Bower, lead vocals of the band, is working as a substitute teacher, longest David had worked as a substitute was around 6 weeks, at a school in Derbyshire. He has also voiced many ads for companies, such as Sainsbury’s. David has been spotted going shopping at times.

Andy Sneap is very active as a music producer, in particular with Judas Priest where he produced their last two albums and has stepped in as live member instead of Glenn Tipton.

== Musical style ==
Hell are most often described as a new wave of British heavy metal (NWOBHM) band, although they strongly distance themselves from this movement, citing that the NWOBHM was already in rapid decline by the time the band actually formed. Their progressive musical style incorporates elements of thrash, power, symphonic, gothic, speed, doom and black metal. Underlying lyrical themes in much Hell material focus on the occult and the darker sides of human nature. Typical themes include a distaste for organised religion, alien abduction, political imprisonment, mental illness, and historical events such as the Black Death and the Bubonic Plague. Although primarily guitar-driven, the band's sound is fleshed out by the use of keyboards and digital sampling. Their approach to song writing is often unorthodox, with numerous complex tempo, time signature and key changes, along with a signature series of atmospheric, theatrical interludes and introductions to their songs.

== Band members ==
=== Current members ===
- Kev Bower – guitars, keyboards, backing vocals (1982–1987, 2008–present)
- Tony Speakman – bass (1982–1987, 2008–present)
- Tim Bowler – drums (1982–1987, 2008–present)
- Andy Sneap – guitars (2008–present)
- David Bower – lead vocals (2010–present)

=== Past members ===
- Dave G. Halliday – lead vocals, guitars (1982–1987; died 1987)
- Sean Kelley – guitars (1987)
- Martin Walkyier – lead vocals (2008–2010)

== Discography ==
=== Studio albums ===
- Human Remains (2011, Nuclear Blast)
- Curse and Chapter (2013, Nuclear Blast)

=== Singles & EPs ===
- "Save Us from Those Who Would Save Us" (1983, 7" self-financed by the band and released on their own label, Deadly Weapon; also included "Deathsquad")
- "Save Us" (2011, Nuclear Blast, also includes "On Earth as It Is in Hell")
- "The Age of Nefarious" (2013, Nuclear Blast)
- "End ov Days" (2014, Nuclear Blast, produced in support of the 2014 tour and given away free at shows)

=== DVDs ===
- The Greatest Show on Earth - As It Is in Hell (2013, Curse And Chapter bonus disc)

=== Videos ===
- "Deathsquad" (1983) - shot in Derbyshire and at Wingfield Manor
- "On Earth as It Is in Hell" (2011) - shot at Wingfield Manor
