= Vendetta (German band) =

German thrash metal band

- Origin: Germany
- Genres: Thrash metal, speed metal, heavy metal
- Years active: 1984–1990, 2002–present
- Labels: Massacre Records formerly also: Noise Records; Metal Axe Records
- Website: vendetta-band.de

Vendetta is a German thrash metal group from Schweinfurt. Founded in 1984, the band dissolved in 1990 and re-activated in 2002. Vendetta's contemporaries include bands such as Exumer and Paradox. Vendetta's signature songs include "Brain Damage", "War", "Precious Existence", and "Conversation". In 2007 the German thrashers released their third album, "Hate", which is the first with the most recent lineup changes since 2002. Vendetta's bassist Klaus "Heiner" Ullrich is currently the only original member present since the band's formation in 1984. The band's lyrical content is connected with everyday topics, such as corruption, politics, violence, and death.

== Band members ==
Current members

- Klaus "Heiner" Ullrich – bass (1984–1990, 2002–present)
- Mario Vogel – vocals (2002–present)
- Michael "Opf" Opfermann – guitars (2012–present)
- Jan Schubert – guitars (2018–present)
- Dominik Bertelt – drums (2018–present)

Former members

- Michael "Micky" Wehner – vocals, guitars (1984–1990)
- Achim "Daxx" Hömerlein – guitars, vocals (1984–1990, 2002–2005)
- Andreas "Samson" Samonil – drums (1984–1990; died 2024)
- Thomas "Lubber" Krämer – drums (2002–2017)
- Frank Heller – guitars (2002–2005, 2012–2017)
- Frank Schölch – guitars (2006–2012)

Live Members

- Mario Hahn – guitars (2009–2011)

Timeline

== Discography ==
=== Studio albums ===
- 1987 – Go and Live... Stay and Die
- 1988 – Brain Damage
- 2007 – Hate
- 2011 – Feed the Extermination
- 2017 – The 5th
- 2023 – Black as Coal

=== Demos ===
- 1985 – System of Death
- 1986 – Suicidal Lunacy
- 2003 – Demo 2003

=== Compilations and video ===
- 1988 – A Cautionary Tale / And the Brave Man Fails, split album with Sabbat
- 1988 – Doomsday News, Various Artists
- 1989 – Doomsday News II, Various Artists
- 1990 – Doomsday News – The Video Compilation Volume 2, Various Artists (video)
- 2003 – Power of Metal – 20 Years in Noise, Various Artists
