= Human Remains (Hell album) =

2011 debut studio album by Hell

Studio album by Hell
- Released: 13 May 2011
- Genre: Heavy metal
- Length: 66:06
- Label: Nuclear Blast
- Producer: Andy Sneap

Hell chronology
Human Remains (2011)	Curse and Chapter (2013)

Human Remains is the first studio album by the UK heavy metal band Hell, released on Friday 13 May 2011 by Nuclear Blast Records.

== Overview ==
The album contains re-recorded versions of songs originally performed by the band during the period 1982–1986, with minor arrangement changes and updates, along with the addition of new keyboard, orchestral, choral and soundscape parts added by Kev Bower. The album was pieced together over a 3-year period principally as a 'hobby project' during occasional periods of downtime at Andy Sneap's Backstage Studios, a converted 300-year-old dairy farm in Derbyshire, England. Sneap funded the entire project out of his own pocket and has been instrumental in the band's resurrection. The recordings were completed with neither hope nor aspirations of any outcome, and the original intention was to produce just a few CDR copies for the bandmembers, close friends and family.

The finished product, however, reached the attention of, and subsequently attracted bids from five record labels, with the band eventually signing to Nuclear Blast Records. The album entered the national charts in Germany and several Scandinavian countries upon its release. It received countless positive reviews and a substantial number of accolades, including "2011 Album of the Year" in Sweden Rock Magazine. It also made the No. 1 position for a 2011 UK album in Metal Hammer (UK), along with featuring in the top 3 of 2011 for several European journals including Aardschok (NL) and Rock Hard (DE). The album also achieved the "2011 Album of the Year" on a substantial number of independent websites, rock forums and suchlike. The album's title is a wordplay, with obvious and immediate connotations of carcasses being turned upside down with the final lyric of "No Martyr's Cage", the album's closing track.

Several tracks featured the voice of former frontman Dave Halliday, with Andy Sneap going to great lengths to lift his voice from old cassette recordings so that he could be incorporated and his memory suitably honoured. Sneap and the rest of the bandmembers also went to similar lengths (along with substantial legal and probate costs) to ensure that the album performance and compositional royalties were split six ways instead of five, with Halliday's share going to his surviving family – this process continues to this day, with Halliday's royalties continuing to be paid for live performance and radio airplay of songs to which he contributed writing credits. The album also ended up with a running time of 66 minutes and 6 seconds, and a file download size of 666MB. This was completely accidental and unintentional. The album also runs non-stop, with track gaps between the songs being filled by a series of musical interludes, introductions and soundscapes.

The album's artwork, painted by British artist and musician Dan Goldsworthy, also received critical acclaim. Although ostensibly dark and demonic in appearance and execution, it contains a whole series of jokes, 'tips of the hat' and various other tongue-in-cheek references to moments throughout the band's history. These include:

- Former frontman Dave Halliday's face superimposed in the sky above the fallen angel on the front cover.
- Dave Halliday's face similarly appears in the flames leaping from Andy Sneap's hand on his internal booklet picture.
- On the internal booklet picture of bassist Tony Speakman's lunatic prison cell wall, there is an Oxo poster – a humorous nod to Speakman's appearance in a British TV commercial for this product several years earlier.
- The lower rear outside cover contains a list of equipment endorsers. The Oxo logo makes a second appearance in this list.
- The introduction soundscape to "The Quest" features guitarist/keyboard player Kev Bower doing a low-level background impression of veteran British TV actor Joe Gladwin performing a voiceover from an '80's UK TV advert for Hovis bread. The band used to perform a modified version of this as a song introduction to "Bedtime" during live performances.
- The backwards Satanic voice which features under the twin-guitar break on the track 'Blasphemy and the Master' is in fact Kev Bower again, delivering a bitter missive about a former employer who sacked him. The recording was pitch-shifted and reversed, but the entire speech is printed in reverse on the lyric sheet for this song, and includes all the names of the perpetrators who collaborated to dismiss him.
- The booklet centrepiece for the bonus disc in the Digipak version contains a spread of record company rejection letters amassed in the 1980s. The rejection letters were deliberately printed large enough for the authors' names to be clearly visible. Many of these individuals have subsequently gone on to hold high-ranking and influential positions in the music industry.
- The Plague doctor character featured within the artwork, along with a rat appearing at the lower left side of the front cover, have always been known to members of the band as 'Beaky' and 'Roland' respectively, with the latter reference alluding to UK children's TV puppet character Roland Rat.
- Dave Halliday received printed cover credits for 'Additional vocals, spiritual interference and dildo'. The latter refers to the fact that numerous unexplainable phenomena occurred during the making of the album, suggesting that a ghostly Mr. Halliday was in fact present throughout, along with the fact that he would regularly stuff bulk-purchased dildos into the cleavages of front-row female fans during live performances.

Several versions were issued:

- Standard single CD jewel case
- 2-CD Digipak version including a bonus disc of the band's original '80's cassette demos and rehearsal room recordings. A minor cutting inaccuracy during production of the outer slipcase for this Digipak made it notoriously difficult to remove the discs from the packaging. The band's merchandising site acknowledges this with the words "So full of metal – you'll never get it out of the slip case".
- 2-CD jewel case version (North America only)
- Triple 180g vinyl package in either red or clear vinyl. Only 300 units were produced in each colour.
- Triple 180g vinyl exclusive for High Roller Records (DE) in black vinyl – again only 300 units were produced.
- Licensed single CD versions for Russia and Japan
- Prior to release, a limited 7" vinyl single picture disc was issued, containing edited versions of "On Earth As It Is in Hell", and "Save Us From Those Who Would Save Us".
- A video for "On Earth as It Is in Hell" was also produced, and has clocked up in excess of 800,000 hits on YouTube.

== Track listing ==
No.	Title	Lyrics	Music	Length
1.	"Overture (Themes from 'Deathsquad')"	Kev Bower	Kev Bower	1:14
2.	"On Earth as It Is in Hell"	David G. Halliday	K. Bower, Tony Speakman	5:09
3.	"Plague and Fyre"	K. Bower, Halliday	K. Bower, Halliday	5:09
4.	"The Oppressors"	Halliday, Alan Short	Halliday, Short	5:53
5.	"Blasphemy and the Master"	K. Bower	K. Bower, Halliday	8:11
6.	"Let Battle Commence"	Halliday	K. Bower	4:23
7.	"The Devil's Deadly Weapon"	David Bower, K. Bower (intro adapted from Short)	K. Bower	10:14
8.	"The Quest"	Speakman, Tim Bowler, Halliday	Halliday, K. Bower	4:21
9.	"Macbeth"	Halliday (intro by William Shakespeare)	Halliday, K. Bower	7:21
10.	"Save Us from Those Who Would Save Us"	Halliday	Halliday (intro by K. Bower)	5:05
11.	"No Martyr's Cage"	K. Bower	Halliday, K. Bower	9:00
Total length:				66:06

=== 1982 – 1986 (limited edition bonus disc) ===
No.	Title	Length
1.	"Deathsquad" (1983 – Single B Side)	4:48
2.	"On Earth as It Is in Hell" (1985 – Square Dance Studio demo)	5:17
3.	"Plague and Fyre" (1986 – 8-track MEK Studio demo)	4:38
4.	"The Oppressors" (1982 – live rehearsal)	6:15
5.	"Blasphemy and the Master" (1982 – 4-track rehearsal room demo)	7:10
6.	"Let Battle Commence" (1982 – 4-track rehearsal room demo)	4:30
7.	"The Devil's Deadly Weapon" (1985 – Square Dance Studio demo)	8:38
8.	"The Quest" (1983 – live rehearsal)	3:49
9.	"Macbeth" (1982 – 4-track rehearsal room demo)	7:35
10.	"Save Us from Those Who Would Save Us" (1983 – Single A Side)	3:47
11.	"No Martyr's Cage" (1983 – live rehearsal)	6:54

== Personnel ==
Hell

- David Bower – lead vocals
- Kev Bower – guitars, keyboards, vocals
- Andy Sneap – guitars
- Tony Speakman – bass
- Tim Bowler – drums
- David G. Halliday – additional vocals on tracks 3, 7, and 9; lead vocals and guitar on demos

Additional performers

- Stephen John Svanholm – additional vocals on tracks 1–3, 5, and 10
- Linda Dawson – additional vocals on tracks 2, 7, and 11
- Peter Ward – bagpipes on track 9
- Stephanie Rodger – child's vocals on track 3

Production and design

- Andy Sneap – engineering, mixing, mastering
- Dan Goldsworthy – Artwork and layout
