= Disembody: The New Flesh =

Studio album by Skinlab
- Released: February 23, 1999
- Recorded: 1998
- Studio: Village Studios, El Paso, Texas
- Genre: Groove metal, nu metal
- Length: 42:11
- Label: Century Media
- Producer: Andy Sneap

Skinlab chronology
Bound, Gagged and Blindfolded (1997)	Disembody: The New Flesh (1999)	ReVoltingRoom (2002)

Professional ratings
Review scores
Source	Rating
AllMusic	3/5 stars

Disembody: The New Flesh is the second full-length studio album by American groove metal band Skinlab. It was recorded in El Paso, Texas at the Village Studios and was produced by Andy Sneap. The album was released February 23, 1999.

== Track listing ==
1. "So Far from the Truth" – 4:40
2. "Know Your Enemies" – 3:05
3. "No Sympathy (For the Devil)" – 3:50
4. "Scapegoat" – 6:06
5. "Breathe" – 3:35
6. "I Name My Pain" – 4:15
7. "Excellerate" – 2:35
8. "Coward" – 3:57
9. "Second Skin: New Flesh" – 5:09
10. "Looks Can Be Deceiving" – 4:39
