= Mourning Has Broken =

Studio album by Sabbat
- Released: 26 March 1991
- Genres: Thrash metal, heavy metal
- Length: 50:58
- Label: Noise Records

Sabbat chronology
Dreamweaver (1989)	Mourning Has Broken (1991)

Professional ratings
Review scores
Source	Rating
Allmusic	link

Mourning Has Broken is the third and final full-length album by the British thrash metal band Sabbat, and the band's only album following the departure of singer and lyricist Martin Walkyier. The album is generally regarded as both a critical and commercial failure, and the band disbanded shortly after its release.

In a 2006 interview with Terrorizer magazine, Andy Sneap stated emphatically: ""I don't listen to this (Mourning Has Broken). There is some mad guitar playing on there; some of the shredding is ridiculous, but it sounds thrown together, which it was; it shouldn't have had the Sabbat name on it."

== Track listing ==
1. "The Demise of History" – 7:52
2. "Theological Void" – 7:26
3. "Paint the World Black" – 5:25
4. "Dumbstruck" – 5:14
5. "The Voice of Time" – 6:45
6. "Dreamscape" – 8:47
7. "Without a Trace" – 7:24
8. "Mourning Has Broken" – 2:05

== Personnel ==
- Andy Sneap – lead guitar
- Richie Desmond – vocals
- Simon Negus – drums
- Wayne Banks – bass
- Neil Watson – rhythm guitar
