= Shattered Existence =

Studio album by Xentrix
- Released: 18 September 1989
- Recorded: 1988
- Genre: Thrash metal
- Length: 42:37
- Label: R/C Records
- Producer: John Cuniberti

Xentrix chronology
Shattered Existence (1989)	For Whose Advantage? (1990)

Professional ratings
Review scores
Source	Rating
Allmusic	3/5 stars

Shattered Existence is the debut album by the British thrash metal band Xentrix. it was released on 18 September 1989 through R/C Records.

== Track listing ==
No.	Title	Length
1.	"No Compromise"	3:03
2.	"Balance of Power"	5:13
3.	"Crimes"	5:35
4.	"Back in the Real World"	3:58
5.	"Dark Enemy"	4:06
6.	"Bad Blood"	5:03
7.	"Reasons for Destruction"	5:28
8.	"Position of Security"	5:05
9.	"Heaven Cent"	5:06
Total length:		42:37

Ghostbusters Edition Bonus Tracks
No.	Title	Length
10.	"Ghostbusters"	2:43
11.	"Nobody's Perfect"	3:41
12.	"Interrogate"	3:08

== Personnel ==
- Chris Astley - vocals, rhythm guitar
- Kristian "Stan" Havard - lead guitar
- Paul "Macka" MacKenzie - bass
- Dennis Gasser - drums
