= Bury the Pain =

Studio album by Xentrix
- Released: 7 June 2019
- Studios: Viscon Studio, Lancashire UK: Backstage Studios, Derbyshire UK (drums)
- Genre: Thrash metal
- Length: 51:11
- Label: Listenable Records
- Producer: Andy Sneap

Xentrix chronology
Scourge (1996)	Bury the Pain (2019)	Seven Words (2022)

Singles from Bury the Pain
- 1. "Bleeding Out" Released: 30 April 2019

Professional ratings
Review scores
Source	Rating
Metal Forces Magazine	5.5/10
The Metal Wanderlust	5/5
Distorted Sound Magazine	9/10
Worship Metal	8/10
The Metal Crypt	4.25/5
Metal Invader	4.5/6

Bury the Pain is the fifth studio album by British thrash metal band Xentrix, released on 7 June 2019 in Europe and 21 June 2019 in North America, 25 years after their previous album Scourge. A music video was produced for the albums title track, "Bury the Pain". It marks the first album with new guitarist/vocalist Jay Walsh, replacing their previous member Chris Astley. In a post on the band's official Facebook page, they stated that by the end of 2015, Astley had no longer wanted to be a part of Xentrix and had left the band. To promote their return, they released a single for the track "Bleeding Out" on streaming services.

== Reception ==
Upon release, the album received praise from fans and critics alike. The Metal Wanderlust heralded it as a perfect return, saying that "it is simply the best thing the genre has to offer right now." Ending their review by stating that "EVERY fucking song is a ball tearing, arse raping, Thrash fest of the highest order. And it just gets better and better as it goes along." Metal Forces Magazine was more critical and negative of the new release, criticizing its sound as being predictable and generic; Adding they’ve become archetypes and victims of the genre that has once again become crowded with sound-alikes. Though they did speak positive of Kristian "Stan" Havard's guitar work, they ended with "Bury the Pain does not teach us anything new and certainly doesn’t put the pretenders in their place, but Xentrix never had that ability previously anyway. And so as the ten tracks trudge by I can only act on instinct and cast the return of Xentrix to the wayside;Bury the Pain added to my pile of other Xentrix releases that have gathered dust over time."

== Track listing ==
All tracks are written by Xentrix, except where noted.

No.	Title	Length
1.	"Bury the Pain"	6:38
2.	"There Will Be Consequences"	4:10
3.	"Bleeding Out"	4:34
4.	"The Truth Lies Buried"	6:39
5.	"Let the World Burn"	5:15
6.	"The Red Mist Descends"	5:12
7.	"World of Mouth"	4:55
8.	"Deathless and Divine"	4:07
9.	"The One You Fear"	5:39
10.	"Evil by Design"	4:09
Total length:		51:11

Japanese bonus track
No.	Title	Writer(s)	Length
11.	"Under the Blade" (Twisted Sister cover)	Dee Snider	4:15
Total length:			55:26

== Personnel ==
Xentrix

- Jay Walsh – vocals, rhythm guitar
- Dennis Gasser – drums
- Chris Shires – bass
- Kristian "Stan" Havard – lead guitar

Production

- Dan Goldsworthy – artwork, layout
- Jaime Gomez Arellano – recording, mixing (track 10)
- Andy Sneap – producer, mixing, recording (drums)
- Russ Russell – mastering
- Martin Talbot – photography
- Phil Lokheart – photography
- Will Tudor – photography
