= Kin (Xentrix album) =

Studio album by Xentrix
- Released: 27 March 1992
- Recorded: February 1992
- Studios: Loco Studios, South Wales
- Genres: Thrash metal, progressive metal
- Length: 46:39
- Label: Roadrunner
- Producer: Mark Flannery

Xentrix chronology
For Whose Advantage? (1990)	Kin (1992)	Scourge (1996)

Professional ratings
Review scores
Source	Rating
AllMusic	1.5/5 stars
Raw	4/5 stars

Kin is the third studio album by British thrash metal band Xentrix. It was released on 27 March 1992, and was their second album released through Roadrunner Records. The album goes more into a progressive approach than their two previous albums and was considered by the band to be the biggest mistake during their career. With a peak at No. 74 on the UK charts, the album was the last charting album for the band and the last album with vocalist/guitarist Chris Astley until his return in 2006.

== Track listing ==
No.	Title	Length
1.	"The Order of Chaos"	4:41
2.	"A Friend to You"	4:55
3.	"All Bleed Red"	3:28
4.	"No More Time"	6:58
5.	"Waiting"	4:31
6.	"Come Tomorrow"	5:37
7.	"Release"	5:31
8.	"See Through You"	6:09
9.	"Another Day"	4:49
10.	"Reward" (bonus track)	2:29
Total length:		46:39

== Personnel ==
Xentrix

- Chris Astley – vocals, rhythm guitar
- Dennis Gasser – drums
- Paul "Macka" MacKenzie – bass
- Kristian "Stan" Havard – lead guitar

Additional musicians

- Carl Arnfield – Keyboards

Production

- Brian Burrows – sleeve design, typography
- Doug Bennett – assistant engineer
- Nick Atkins – mixing (assistant)
- Mark Flannery – producer, engineering, mixing
- Dave Higginson – cover art
- Vincent McDonald – band photos
