= Seven Words (album) =

Studio album by Xentrix
- Released: 11 November 2022
- Studios: Backstage Studios, Derbyshire: Viscon Studios, Lancashire
- Genre: Thrash metal
- Length: 49:47
- Label: Listenable Records
- Producer: Andy Sneap

Xentrix chronology
Bury the Pain (2019)	Seven Words (2022)	Allied with the Enemy (2026)

Seven Words is the sixth studio album by British thrash metal band Xentrix, and released 11 November 2022 through Listenable Records. To promote the upcoming release the band produced music videos for both the title track, "Seven Words", and "Reckless with a Smile".

== Background ==
Guitarist Kristian Havard revealed prior that the LP is a "culmination of the last two years of experimenting and trying new ideas. It feels like a big step for the band, but without leaving our thrash metal history, and I can't wait for people to hear it."

== Reception ==
Professional ratings
Review scores
Source	Rating
Blabbermouth	8.5/10
AllAbouttheRock	8.5/10

General reception has been positive upon its release. AllAboutTheRock praised the album, loving every track. They mentioned that track after track on the album is a relentless, full-on thrash fest. Furthermore, adding, "I’m beginning to think Xentrix are back to show the younger bands how thrash metal is supposed to be done. All fans of Xentrix and indeed fans of thrash metal seriously need to check this album out." In a positive review, Blabbermouth mentioned that from start to finish, Seven Words sounds authoritative and sonically dynamic, with just about the right amount of dirt under its fingernails. "Yes, XENTRIX deal in thrash metal archetypes, but with a degree of skill that belies their underdog status."

== Track listing ==
No.	Title	Length
1.	"Behind the Walls of Treachery"	6:05
2.	"Seven Words"	3:57
3.	"Spit Coin"	4:11
4.	"The Alter of Nothing"	4:00
5.	"Everybody Loves You When You're Dead"	5:09
6.	"Reckless with a Smile"	4:09
7.	"Ghost Tape Number 10"	4:23
8.	"My War"	4:39
9.	"Kill and Protect"	4:56
10.	"Anything but the Truth"	5:19

CD exclusive bonus track
No.	Title	Length
11.	"Billion Dollar Babies" (Alice Cooper cover)	2:52

== Personnel ==
Xentrix

- Jay Walsh – vocals, rhythm guitar
- Dennis Gasser – drums
- Chris Shires – bass
- Kristian "Stan" Havard – lead guitar

Production

- Dan Goldsworthy – artwork, layout
- Andy Sneap – producer, mixing, mastering
