= Re:Ignition =

American rock band

- Origin: Bay Area, San Francisco, U.S.
- Genres: Hard rock, alternative metal
- Years active: 2004–present
- Label: Corporate Punishment
- Spinoff of: Skinlab
- Members: Dave Moore; Steev Esquivel; Tim Howell; Snake; Mark Hernandez
- Website: reignitionmusic.com

Re:Ignition is a five-piece hard rock/alternative metal music group from Bay Area, San Francisco.

== History ==
Formed in 2004, the band composes Skinlab members lead vocals/guitarist Steev Esquivel and guitarist Steve "Snake" Green. The band released their debut album Empty Heart, Loaded Gun, on November 21, 2006 via Corporate Punishment Records.

Metal Hammer UK described the band's music as "hard-hitting, driving rock tracks with a beefy weight behind them". Re:Ignition also featured in the magazine's "Top 100 bands to watch for in 2007" list.

== Discography ==
Release date	Title	Label
November 21, 2006	Empty Heart, Loaded Gun	Corporate Punishment
