= Xentrix =

English thrash metal band

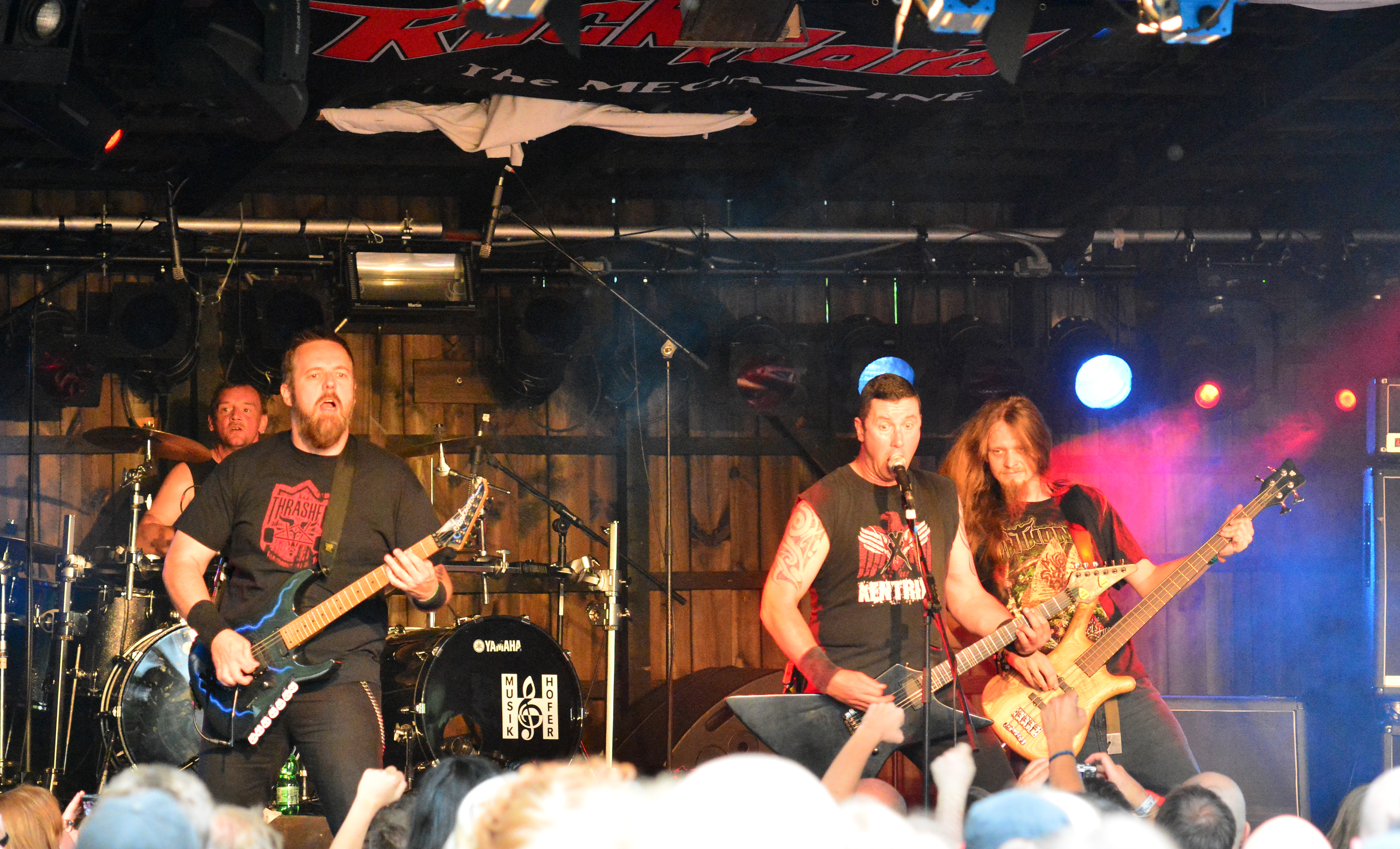
- Xentrix performing in 2014

Background information
- Also known as: Sweet Vengeance (1984–1988)
- Origin: Preston, Lancashire, England
- Genre: Thrash metal
- Years active: 1984–1997; 2005–2006; 2013–present
- Labels: Roadrunner Records; Heavy Metal Records; Listenable Records
- Members: Kristian Havard; Jay Walsh; Chris Shires; Dennis Gasser
- Past members: Chris Astley; Sean Owens; Peter Hiller; Steve Hodgson; Mel Gasser; John Brennand; Dave Catchpole; Simon Gordon; Andy Rudd; Paul MacKenzie
- Website: xentrix.co.uk

Xentrix (/ˈzɛntrɪks/) are an English thrash metal band formed as Sweet Vengeance in Preston, Lancashire in 1984. They changed their name to Xentrix in 1988, and released four albums – Shattered Existence (1989), For Whose Advantage? (1990), Kin (1992) and Scourge (1996) – before disbanding in 1997. After briefly reuniting in 2005–2006, Xentrix reunited again in 2013, and they have since released three more albums: Bury the Pain (2019), Seven Words (2022) and Allied with the Enemy (2026). As part of the late 1980s-early-to-mid 1990s underground metal scene, Xentrix have been referred to as one of the "Big Four" of English thrash metal, along with Acid Reign, Onslaught and Sabbat.

== History ==
Chris Astley, the singer and guitarist of Xentrix (Interview 1990)

Xentrix were called Sweet Vengeance from 1984 to 1988. The original lineup consisted of vocalist/rhythm guitarist Chris Astley, guitarist Kristian Havard, bassist Paul MacKenzie, and drummer Dennis Gasser. The band received a five-star rating from Kerrang! magazine. Roadrunner Records arranged an audition with the band, after which the band signed to the label and recorded their first album, Shattered Existence, in the summer of 1989. The band toured with Sabbat to support the album.

In 1990, the band's cover of Ray Parker Jr.'s "Ghostbusters" theme caused a minor controversy for the unauthorised use of the Ghostbusters logo (with the ghost giving the finger) on the original artwork for the single. The single was re-released with a different cover.

The band opened for Bay Area thrash metal band Testament in 1990. Later that year, they recorded their second album, For Whose Advantage?, which gained them more interest and their first music video for the album's title track. Xentrix promoted For Whose Advantage? with a tour with Skyclad, and played shows with Slayer and Sepultura.

In 1992, the band adopted a more progressive style with their album Kin, which many considered the band's biggest mistake despite critical acclaim. A video for "The Order of Chaos" was shot and received some airplay on MTV. To promote the album, Xentrix toured with Tankard.

After a hiatus and replacing Astley with Simon Gordon and Andy Rudd on vocals and rhythm guitar, respectively, Xentrix released their fourth album, Scourge, in 1996. The band adopted a slower, groove metal sound. The band broke up shortly after its release, citing the decline in popularity in the British metal scene as the reason.

In 2005, Xentrix announced its classic lineup would reunite for a small number of dates. They played a handful of shows in the UK in the spring of 2006, including one with Onslaught and Evile. Despite positive response, Xentrix announced in September that they had once again split up.

On 4 February 2013, it was announced via Evile's Facebook page that a reunited Xentrix would join Kreator and Evile for a three-show UK tour in late April. This was initially the full Shattered Existence lineup, but, later in the year, bassist MacKenzie left to be replaced with Chris Shires. On 15 February, the band announced that they were working on new material.

Select shows continued in early 2014, and, at the Up the Hammers Festival in Athens, Greece on 8 March, they debuted the song "World of Mouth", and included it in their set supporting Overkill on their UK tour, starting in London on 13 March. In October 2015, Xentrix embarked on a six-date UK tour with Acid Reign and Shrapnel. On 14 July 2017, it was announced that Xentrix had parted with Astley and replaced him with vocalist Jay Walsh.

On 27 March 2019, Xentrix announced Bury the Pain as the title of their first studio album in 23 years. The album was released on 7 June 2019 through Listenable Records. Bury the Pain peaked at No. 34 on the UK Rock & Metal Albums Chart.

In a June 2019 interview with Metal Crypt, guitarist Havard revealed that Xentrix already had begun writing the follow-up to Bury the Pain. By March 2021, the band had written and demoed at least twelve songs for their new album, and announced that August they were in the studio recording it. The album was completed in June 2022, and a month later, the band announced Seven Words as its album title and that it would be released on 11 November. Seven Words peaked at No. 39 on the UK Rock & Metal Albums Chart. In order to promote Seven Words, Xentrix (along with Whiplash and Artillery) supported Vio-lence on the European MTV Headbangers Ball Tour. Astley rejoined by filling in for Walsh on the tour as Walsh was awaiting the birth of his second child in November 2022. Xentrix renewed their deal with Listenable Records in November 2023, and their seventh studio album, Allied with the Enemy, was released on 30 October 2026.

== Members ==
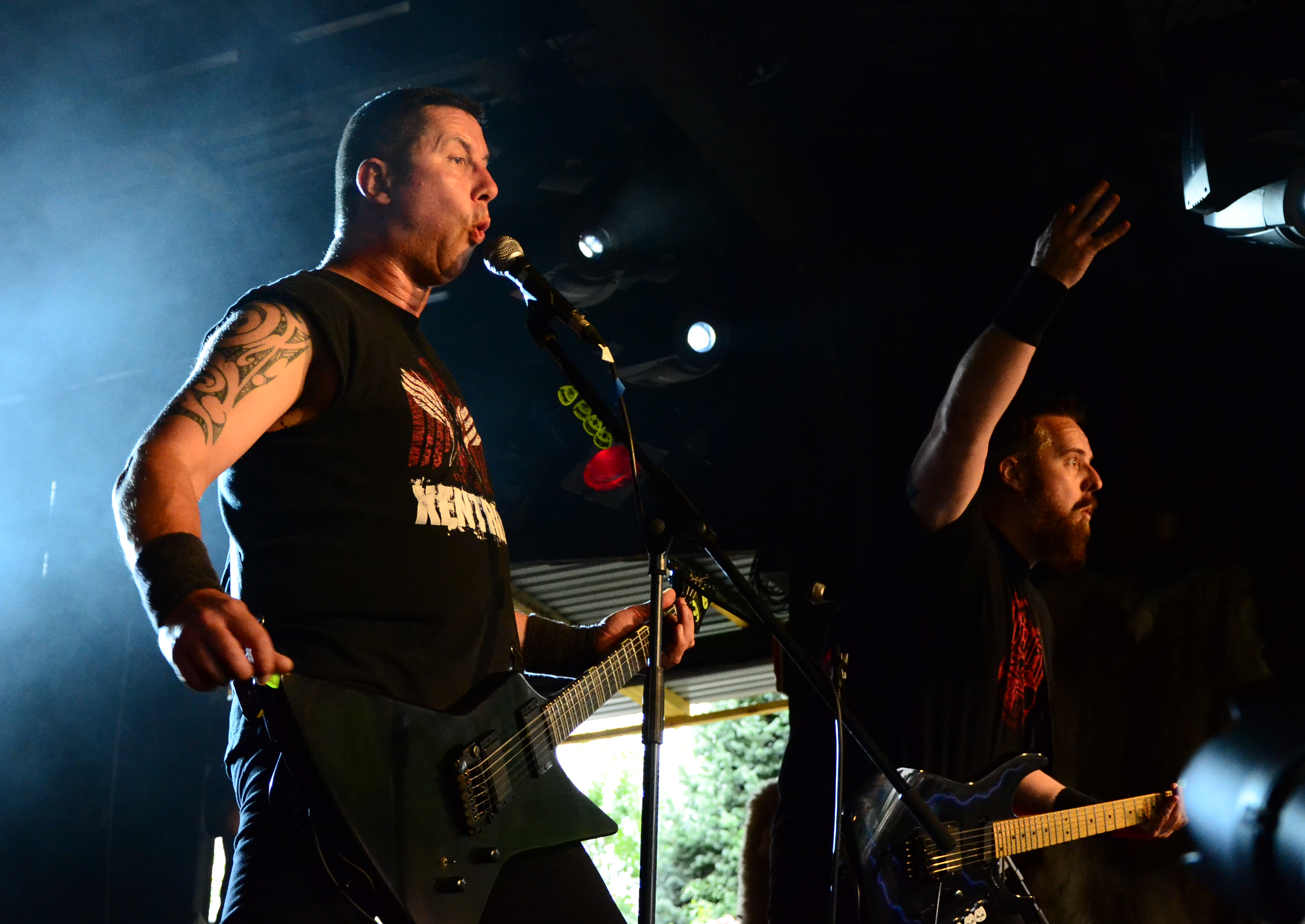
Xentrix performing in 2014

Current line-up

- Kristian Havard – lead guitar (1988–1997, 2005–2006, 2013–present)
- Dennis Gasser – drums (1988–1997, 2005–2006, 2013–present)
- Chris Shires – bass (2013–present)
- Jay Walsh – vocals, rhythm guitar (2017–present)

Former members

- Paul MacKenzie – bass (1988–1997, 2005–2006, 2013)
- Chris Astley – vocals, rhythm guitar (1988–1994, 2005–2006, 2013–2017, guest 2022)
- Simon Gordon – vocals (1995–1997)
- Andy Rudd – rhythm guitar (1995–1997)

Timeline

== Discography ==
=== Studio albums ===
- Shattered Existence (1989)
- For Whose Advantage? (1990)
- Kin (1992)
- Scourge (1996)
- Bury the Pain (2019)
- Seven Words (2022)
- Allied with the Enemy (2026)

=== Other releases ===
- Hunger for Demo (demo, 1987)
- "No Compromise" (single, 1989)
- "Ghostbusters" (single, 1990)
- "For Whose Advantage?" (single, 1990)
- "Questions" (single, 1990)
- Dilute to Taste (live EP, 1991)
- "The Order of Chaos" (single, 1992)
- Demo 1994 (demo, 1994)
