= Beneath the Surface (2007 film) =

- Directed by: Blake Reigle
- Written by: Blake Reigle
- Produced by: Blake Reigle
- Starring: Kyle Stanley; Dominique Geisendorff; Christian Munden; Brett Lawrence; Jerry Schumacher; Gloria Grant
- Cinematography: Nathan Tieman
- Edited by: Blake Reigle
- Music by: Kyle Rector
- Production company: Northwood Films
- Distributed by: Well Go USA Entertainment
- Release date: June 3, 2007 (STIFF)
- Running time: 94 minutes
- Country: United States
- Language: English
- Budget: $4500

Beneath the Surface is a 2007 American horror comedy film written and directed by Blake Reigle. It stars Kyle Stanley as a high school student who uses voodoo to resurrect his crush, played by Dominique Geisendorff, when she dies.

== Plot ==
High school senior Ethan has a crush on his childhood friend, Kahlah. Ethan believes that Kahlah's boyfriend, Shane, is dangerous, but he does not know how to tell her without seeming to be crazy. Annoyed by her reluctance to have sex with him, Shane drugs and accidentally kills Kahlah. Convinced that Shane is guilty, Ethan uses his anthropologist neighbor's knowledge of voodoo to raise Kahlah from the dead as a zombie so that she can help him prove Shane's guilt.

== Cast ==
- Kyle Stanley as Ethan
- Dominique Geisendorff as Kahlah
- Christian Munden as Eric
- Brett Lawrence as Shane
- Jerry Schumacher as Shane's father
- Gloria Grant as Angelica

== Production ==
Shooting took place in Irvine, California.

== Release ==
Beneath the Surface premiered at Seattle's True Independent Film Festival on June 3, 2007. Well Go USA Entertainment released Beneath the Surface on DVD on October 7, 2008.

== Reception ==
John Latchem of Home Media Magazine wrote that the film is "somewhat unpredictable". Steve Barton of Dread Central rated it 3.5/5 stars and praised Reigle's "raw directorial talent and great writing sensibilities". Steve Pattee of HorrorTalk rated it 1.5/5 stars and wrote, "Surface's story is so completely predictable, it's frightening." Writing in The Zombie Movie Encyclopedia, Volume 2, academic Peter Dendle said, "This rough teen drama from southern California captures a gritty feel in some scenes, in part because of the limited production values, but overall fails to create a consistent mood or emotional connection." It won best feature at the Sacramento Horror Film Festival.
