= The Scars Between Us =

Studio album by Skinlab
- Released: September 15, 2009
- Genre: Groove metal, nu metal
- Label: Stand and Deliver

Skinlab chronology
ReVoltingRoom (2002)	The Scars Between Us (2009)

Professional ratings
Review scores
Source	Rating
AllMusic	2.5/5 stars
MetalSucks	1.5/5 stars

The Scars Between Us is the fourth full-length album by American groove metal band Skinlab. It was released September 15, 2009, seven years after the band's previous studio album.

== Track listing ==
1. "Face of Aggression" - 3:44
2. "Amphetamine Gods" - 3:22
3. "Scream at the World" - 5:44
4. "Wolvesblood" - 3:24
5. "Karma Burns" - 6:46
6. "In for the Kill" - 4:19
7. "Paper Trails" - 5:55
8. "Still Suffering" - 4:42
9. "Bloodclot" - 1:56
10. "My Vendetta" - 5:01
11. "The Scars Between Us" - 5:35

== Critical reception ==
Reviews of the album ranged from negative to mixed.

AllMusic gave a mixed review, classifying the songs as technically competent but unoriginal nu metal tracks with far too long a run-time. There were also accusations that riffs had gone far past being influenced and outright impersonated various major bands such as Metallica and Machine Head.

MetalSucks gave a negative review, again criticising the lack of originality and flagrant impersonations. The review also criticised the loss of groove seen in the band's early work, leading to a general dullness in a number of songs.

Exclaim! also gave a mixed reception of the review, judging it "moderately interesting" but once again criticised the lack of originality.
