= Bound, Gagged and Blindfolded =

Studio album by Skinlab
- Released: July 8, 1997
- Recorded: February 1997 - Hyde Street Studios, San Francisco
- Genre: Groove metal
- Label: Century Media
- Producer: Andy Sneap

Skinlab chronology
Bound, Gagged and Blindfolded (1997)	Eyesore (1998)

Professional ratings
Review scores
Source	Rating
AllMusic	2.5/5 stars

Bound, Gagged and Blindfolded is the debut full-length album by American groove metal band Skinlab. It was recorded at Hyde Street Studios in San Francisco, California, and was produced by Andy Sneap. The album was released July 8, 1997, and re-issued with bonus material in October 2007.

== Track listing ==
- All lyrics by Steev Esquivel, all music by Skinlab, except where noted.
1. "When Pain Comes to Surface" – 4:29 (Music: Skinlab and Brian Regan)
2. "Dissolve" – 3:50
3. "Race of Hate" – 5:12
4. "Paleface" – 4:24 (Music: Skinlab and Adam Albright)
5. "Down" – 4:09
6. "Promised" – 6:43
7. "Stumble" – 4:08
8. "The Art of Suffering" – 5:03
9. "Ten Seconds" – 4:53 (Music: Skinlab and Albright)
