= For Whose Advantage? =

Studio album by Xentrix
- Released: 21 August 1990
- Recorded: June 1990
- Studio: Loco Studios, South Wales
- Genre: Thrash metal
- Length: 43:05
- Label: Roadrunner
- Producer: John Cuniberti

Xentrix chronology
| Shattered Existence (1989) | For Whose Advantage? (1990) | Kin (1992) |

Professional ratings
Review scores
| Source | Rating |
|---|---|
| Rock Hard | 8/10 |

For Whose Advantage? is the second studio album by British thrash metal band Xentrix. It was released on 21 August 1990 released through Roadrunner Records. The album continues the thrashy sound of their 1989 debut Shattered Existence.

== Track listing ==
| No. | Title | Length |
|---|---|---|
| 1. | "Questions" | 5:10 |
| 2. | "For Whose Advantage?" | 6:21 |
| 3. | "The Human Condition" | 3:37 |
| 4. | "False Ideals" | 5:49 |
| 5. | "The Bitter End" | 5:18 |
| 6. | "New Beginnings" | 1:16 |
| 7. | "Desperate Remedies" | 4:50 |
| 8. | "Kept in the Dark" | 4:09 |
| 9. | "Black Embrace" | 3:49 |
| 10. | "Running White Faced City Boy" (Gillan cover) | 2:46 |
| Total length: | | 43:05 |

== Personnel ==
Xentrix

- Chris Astley – vocals, rhythm guitar
- Kristian "Stan" Havard – lead guitar
- Paul "Macka" MacKenzie – bass guitar
- Dennis Gasser – drums

Additional musicians

- Professor Smithy Nicks – speech (track 2)

Production

- Brian Burrows – sleeve design, typography
- John Cuniberti – producer, engineering, mixing
- Doug Bennett – engineering
- Mark Flannery – engineering
- Dave Higginson – cover art
- Andrew Horsfield – band photos
