= Under the Surface =

Under the Surface may refer to:

- Under the Surface (Marit Larsen album), 2006, or the title song
- Under the Surface (Christopher album), 2019
- "Under the Surface", a 1993 song by Morgoth from the album Odium
- "Under the Surface", a 1999 song by Neurosis from the album Times of Grace
- "Under the Surface", a 1999 song by The Haunted from the album Made Me Do It
- "Under the Surface", a 2019 song by Lacuna Coil from the album Black Anima

== See also ==
- Submarine (disambiguation)
