= Skinlab =

American metal band

- Origin: San Francisco, California, U.S.
- Genres: Groove metal; alternative metal; nu metal
- Years active: 1994–2003, 2007–2011, 2016–present
- Labels: Art Is War, Crash, Century Media
- Members: Steev Esquivel; Keyhan Moini; Kris Grizz; Marcos Medina
- Past members: Mike Roberts; Gary Wendt; Steve Green ("Snake"); Julian Peach; Glenny Telford (deceased); Brian Jackson
- Website: skinlabofficial.com

Skinlab is an American heavy metal band formed in 1994 in San Francisco, California by vocalist/bassist Steev Esquivel (who previously was in and would again rejoin Bay Area thrash metal band Defiance), guitarist Mike Roberts (now with San Francisco Bay Area's RAZE the STRAY), guitarist Gary Wendt (who played for the Bay Area thrash band Sacrilege B.C. and currently fronts The Ghost Next Door), and drummer Paul Hopkins.

== History ==
After releasing three full-length studio albums and an EP, they disbanded in 2003 following the departure of two core members.

Following the band's demise, vocalist/bassist Steev Esquivel and guitarist Steve "Snake" Green went on to form Re:Ignition. The band's debut album, Empty Heart, Loaded Gun, was released in November 2006 through Corporate Punishment Records.

After a three-year hiatus, the band featuring line-up of Steev Esquivel, Snake, Glen Telford and Paul Hopkins had reformed and were rehearsing with plans for a new album in 2009.

Following the 2009 release of Skinlab's album, The Scars Between Us, which according to Esquivel, performed badly sales-wise, guitarist Glenny Telford once again left the band. He was replaced by Brian Jackson (formerly of the Las Vegas band Kreep). As of June 2011, Ex-Rikets guitarist Provo took over guitar duties opposite Snake. Having failed to produce any new material, Skinlab has disbanded.

On September 22, 2016, it was announced that Steev Esquivel and Paul Hopkins had reformed Skinlab, with former members Mike Roberts and Gary Wendt returning to the band as well. The band would perform their debut album in full at various shows in late 2016.

== Members ==
=== Current members ===
- Steev Esquivel – bass, vocals (1994–2011, 2016–present)
- Kris Grizz– guitars (2026–present)
- Marcos Medina Rivera – guitars (2018–present)
- Keyhan Moini – drums (2026–present)

=== Former members ===
- Paul Hopkins – drums (1994–2011, 2016–2019)
- Mike Roberts – guitars (1994–1998, 2010, 2016–2018)
- Gary Wendt – guitars (1995–1997, 2016–2018)
- Mike Cadoo - guitars
- Steve "Snake" Green – guitars, backing vocals (1998–2011, 2018–2021)
- Glenny Telford – guitars, backing vocals (2003, 2006–2009; died 2018)
- Adam Albright – guitars (2007)
- Brian Jackson – guitars (2009-2011- 2015-2016)
- Julian Peach – guitars (2010–2011)
- Provo – guitars (2011)
- Jason Wolfe – guitars (2012)
- Fabian Vestod - drums (2019-2025)

== Discography ==
Studio albums

- Bound, Gagged and Blindfolded (Century Media, 1997)
- Disembody: The New Flesh (Century Media, 1999)
- ReVoltingRoom (Century Media, 2002)
- The Scars Between Us (Stand and Deliver Records, 2009)
- Venomous (2019)

Other releases

- Eyesore (Century Media, 1998)
- Nerve Damage (Century Media, 2004)
- Skinned Alive (BCD Music, 2008)

Demos

- Circle of Vengeance (self-released, 1995)
- Suffer (self-released, 1996)
- 1997 Demo (self-released, 1997)
