= Brian Bates (psychologist) =

British academic

Brian Bates (born 1944) is former chairman of Psychology at the University of Sussex. He is currently the director of the Medical Psychology Project at the Department of Psychology at University of Sussex in England. He is a visiting professor at the University of Brighton. He is known as the author of books on the shamanic wisdom of Anglo-Saxon England, and for his related course on "Shamanic Consciousness". He has also taught and directed at the Royal Academy of Dramatic Art in London.

== Books ==
=== Anglo-Saxon Shamanism ===
- The Way of Wyrd: Tales of an Anglo-Saxon Sorcerer (London: Century, 1983, ISBN 978-0-7126-0277-8)
- The Wisdom of the Wyrd: Teachings for Today from Our Ancient Past (London: Rider & Co., 1996, ISBN 978-0-7126-7277-1)
- The Real Middle-Earth: Magic and Mystery in the Dark Ages (London: Sidgwick & Jackson Ltd, 2002, ISBN 978-0-283-07353-3)

=== Psychology ===
- The Way of the Actor: A Path to Knowledge & Power (Random House, 1987, ISBN 978-0-87773-384-3)
- How to Manage Your Mother: 10 Steps to a Better Relationship (with Alyce Faye Eichelberger-Cleese) (Diane Publishing Co., 1999, ISBN 978-0-7567-8333-4)
- The Human Face (with John Cleese) (DK Publishing Inc., 2001, ISBN 978-0-7894-7836-8)
