= Revolting Room =

ReVoltingRoom

Studio album by Skinlab
- Released: May 27, 2002
- Genre: Nu metal, alternative metal
- Label: Century Media Records

Skinlab chronology
Disembody: The New Flesh (1999)	ReVoltingRoom (2002)	The Scars Between Us (2009)

Professional ratings
Review scores
Source	Rating
AllMusic	4/5 stars
Blabbermouth.net	9/10 stars

Revolting Room (stylized as ReVoltingRoom) is the third full-length studio album by American heavy metal band Skinlab. It was released on May 27, 2002.

Some of the album's sampled content was created by rantings from band fans who called a free number.

== Track listing ==
1. "Intro" – 0:44
2. "Come Get It" – 4:03
3. "Slave the Way" (feat. Juan Urteaga of Vile) – 3:15
4. "Purify" – 4:23
5. "Anthem for a Fallen Star" (feat. Paul Mendoza of Unjust) – 3:41
6. "Disturbing the Art of Expression" (feat. Chris Agguaire of 209) – 5:02
7. "Take As Needed" (feat. Brock Lindow of 36 Crazyfists) – 3:31
8. "Jesus Cells" – 5:02
9. "Never Give In" – 6:33
10. "One of Us" (feat. Daryl Palumbo of Glassjaw) – 25:56
