= Damien Done discography =

Band discography

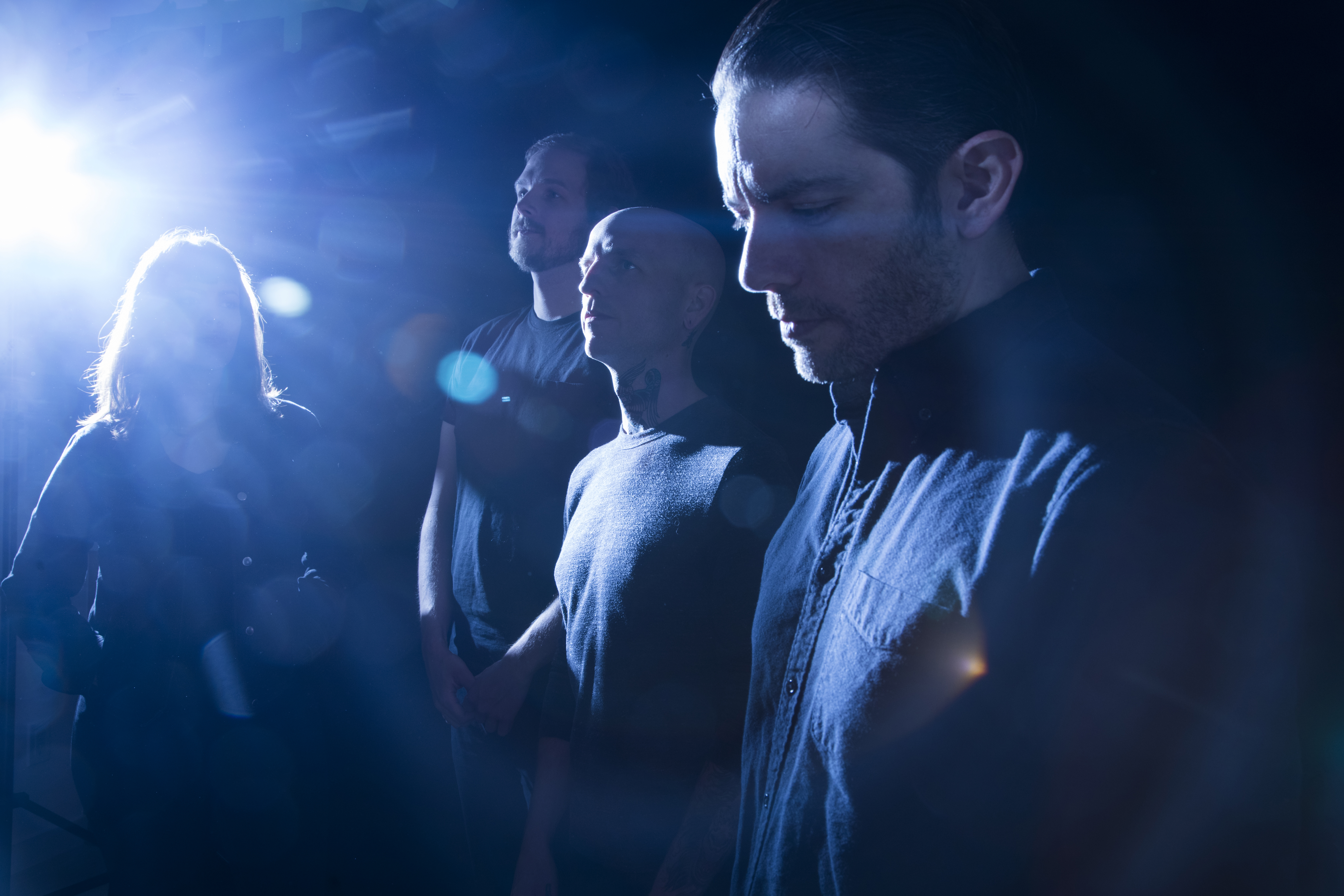
- Damien Done on June 13, 2019.
- Studio albums: 2
- EPs: 4
- Compilation albums: 5
- Singles: 15
- Music videos: 9

The discography of Damien Done, an American post-punk / gothic rock band, includes two studio albums, four extended plays, five internet compilation extended plays, fourteen singles and eight music videos.

The band recorded its debut EP, Love Thongs, in September 2003, which was scheduled for release through Belgian record label Good Life Recordings in early 2004; the EP was ultimately shelved for thirteen years. Meanwhile, the band self-released a series of internet compilations through Bandcamp, including Electron(ish), Outtakes & Rarities, Blown Covers, and an expanded edition of Love Thongs and Bits of Happy under the title Stay Black. Love Thongs was finally picked up by German record label Demons Run Amok Entertainment, which released it under the new title Stay Black in July 2016. The double A-side single "He Really Tried" / "And Now the Rain" was simultaneously released through Demons Run Amok.

Damien Done followed-up with Charm Offensive, the band's debut full-length album, released in March 2018 by American record label Mind Over Matter Records and Belgian record label Hypertension Records. The album spanned the singles "Curious Thing", "Primitive", "The Lord Fox", and "Roof Access". In February 2020, Damien Done released the EP Baby, Don't Hearse Me through Mind Over Matter Records. The band quickly followed up with the To Night EP and its accompanied title song single, co-released in May 2020 by Mind Over Matter Records, with American record label Contraband Goods and British record label Speedowax Records. In July 2020, the band released a cover single of House of Love's "Shine On", and in February 2021, another cover single of Iggy Pop and David Bowie's "Nightclubbing" was released.

The band's sophomore full-length album, Total Power, is scheduled for release through Mind Over Matter Records and Protagonist Music in May 2023. The debut single from the release, "Pray for Me", was released on January 31, 2023, followed by "Inexorcisable", on March 24, 2023, and "Bounty & Blight" (which features guest vocalist La Femme Pendu) on April 21, 2023.

== Albums ==
=== Studio albums ===
Title	Album details
Charm Offensive	Released: March 2, 2018; Label: Mind Over Matter / Hypertension
Total Power	Released: May 19, 2023; Label: Mind Over Matter / Protagonist

== Extended plays ==
=== Studio extended plays ===
Title	EP details
Love Thongs	Released: April 2004; Label: Good Life
Stay Black	Released: July 8, 2016; Label: Demons Run Amok
Baby, Don't Hearse Me	Released: February 14, 2020; Label: Mind Over Matter
To Night	Released: May 29, 2020; Label: Mind Over Matter / Speedowax / Contraband Goods

=== Compilation extended plays ===
Title	Album details
Electron(ish)	Released: August 20, 2011; Label: Self-released
Outtakes & Rarities	Released: August 20, 2011; Label: Self-released
Blown Covers	Released: January 23, 2016; Label: Self-released
Demos for Protection	Released: January 1, 2017; Label: Self-released
Demos from the Year 2020	Released: November 23, 2020; Label: Self-released

== Singles ==
=== Singles ===
Title (A-side/B-side)	Single details
"Ass-Crack Is the New Cleavage"	Released: February 6, 2004; Label: Good Life
"He Really Tried" "And Now the Rain"	Released: July 8, 2016; Label: Demons Run Amok
XMAS/split (split with Nathaniel Shannon & The Vanishing Twin)	Released: December 21, 2016; Label: Self-released
"Curious Thing" "Primitive"	Released: August 25, 2017; Label: Mind Over Matter
"The Lord Fox"	Released: January 13, 2018; Label: Mind Over Matter
"Roof Access"	Released: February 16, 2018; Label: Mind Over Matter
"Everybody Loves You (When You're Dead)" "Pretty Boy"	Released: June 30, 2018; Label: Mind Over Matter
Deadcuts / Damien Done (split with DeadCuts)	Released: March 1, 2019; Label: Speedowax
"Shine On"	Released: July 24, 2020; Label: Self-released
To Night Remixes	Released: October 16, 2020; Label: Self-released
"To Night"	Released: October 29, 2021; Label: Mind Over Matter
"Nightclubbing"	Released: February 5, 2021; Label: Self-released
"Pray for Me"	Released: January 31, 2023; Label: Mind Over Matter
"Inexorcisable"	Released: March 24, 2023; Label: Mind Over Matter
"Bounty and Blight" (featuring La Femme Pendu)	Released: April 21, 2023; Label: Mind Over Matter

== Videos ==
=== Music videos ===
List of music videos, with directors, showing date released along with albums
Title	Date	Director(s)	Album
"Ass-Crack Is the New Cleavage"	February 6, 2004	Dwid Hellion	Love Thongs / Stay Black
"Curious Thing"	August 27, 2017	Andy Westra	Charm Offensive
"Primitive"	September 15, 2017	Damien Moyal	Charm Offensive
"The Lord Fox"	January 13, 2018	Matt Craft	Charm Offensive
"Roof Access"	February 16, 2018	Andy Westra	Charm Offensive
"To Night"	October 29, 2021	Seppe Dausi	To Night
"Pray for Me"	January 31, 2023	Joe Halberstadt	Total Power
"Inexorcisable"	March 24, 2023	Andy Westra	Total Power
"Bounty and Blight"	April 21, 2023	Seppe Dausi	Total Power

== Other appearances ==
Song	Year	Album	Label
"New Cleavage"	2004	Good Life Recordings Presents: Never Surrender - The Best New Underground Music 2004-2005	Good Life
"Catsong"	2006	The Vice Guide to Travel	Vice Records / Vice Films
"Eighteen"	2007	Harder They Fall: Tribute to Integrity	Escapist
"She's About to Lose It", "Untitled (A Lot)", "Saw Whet", "I Want to Solve the Problem in Your Dress", "Saturday" and "Awkward, Fun, Clumsy and Cute"	2009	J'fais du porno et j'aime ça	La Fille D'O
"Soundscape Song"	2009	Skin. Like. Sun.	La Fille D'O / Blue Artichoke Films
"Nobody's Christmas Hero" and "O' Christmas Song"	2010	Gators! & Friends Present: Homesick Holidays - A Sorrowful Christmas Compilation	Gators!
"Pearl Necklace"	2013	Under Covers	La Fille D'O
"To Night"	2020	Peace Is Earned: A Benefit Compilation for Black Lives Matter	Black Lives Matter
