= Mark Keds =

English singer (1970–2021)

Mark Myers
- Also known as: Mark Keds / Hammerton
- Born: 28 October 1970; London, England
- Died: 11 January 2021 (aged 50)
- Genres: Alternative rock; indie rock; punk rock
- Occupations: Singer-songwriter, musician
- Instruments: Guitar, vocals
- Years active: 1986–2020
- Labels: Epic, Speedowax
- Formerly of: Senseless Things; The Wildhearts; Jolt; The Lams; Deadcuts
- Website: https://www.deadcuts.com/

Mark Myers (28 October 1970 – 11 January 2021), better known as Mark Keds, was an English singer, songwriter and guitarist, from Twickenham, London, best known for leading the bands Senseless Things and Deadcuts. Kerrang! hailed him as a "prolific musician" and "unvarnished talent".

== Biography ==
Keds began playing music with future Senseless Things members Morgan Nicholls and Cass Browne in the early 1980s, initially in the bands Wild Division and the Psychotics. They formed Senseless Things in 1986, completing the line-up with the addition of Ben Harding in 1987. The band released four studio albums and a Peel Sessions album between 1989 and 1995, had two Top 20 singles, and toured internationally.

In 1995, Keds briefly joined the Wildhearts, and recorded on the B-sides to the top 30 "Just in Lust" single. He also formed the new band Jolt with Lenie Mets from Senseless Things' touring partners Mambo Taxi, and drummer Spike T Smith; Jolt released a mini-album and a series of EPs and singles between 1996 and 1998. In 2004, the Libertines released the single "Can't Stand Me Now", written by Pete Doherty with Mark Keds which reused lyrics from Jolt's "Hey Kitten" single.

After Jolt, Keds formed the Lams (originally called Trip Fontaine), while curating the "Bring Your Own Poison" night at Whitechapel's Rhythm Factory venue, and an accompanying compilation of bands that had played the club. By the late 2000s Keds was playing in the band Like a Bitch, although the Lams later released an album, Anarchy Or Death, in 2011.

In 2012, Keds and Jerome Alexandre formed Deadcuts, initially with members of The Wonder Stuff and Miranda Sex Garden, releasing two albums: Dark is the Night (2014) and Hit on All Sixxes (2018); and a series of singles between 2013 and 2019.Other members included Cass Browne (Senseless things /Gorillaz) and collaborations with Alabama 3’s Reverend Wayne Love and Hip hop moguls Flatbush Zombies and Kane Grocery’s In 2018, Keds recorded a track with The Herbaliser which appeared on their album Bring Out The Sound.

== Death ==
Keds died on 11 January 2021, at the age of 50. He had been suffering from chronic obstructive pulmonary disease.

== Selected discography ==
=== with Senseless Things ===
- 1989: Postcard C.V. (album)
- 1991: The First of Too Many (album)
- 1993: Empire of the Senseless (album)
- 1994: Peel Sessions (compilation)
- 1995: Taking Care of Business (album)
- 1998: The Singles (compilation)

=== with the Wildhearts ===
- 1995: "Just in Lust" EP (tracks rereleased on P.H.U.Q. - 2010 reissue)

=== with Jolt ===
- 1997: Punk Jungle Rules (mini-album)

=== with the Libertines ===
- 2004: "Can't Stand Me Now" (single; credited as co-writer)

=== with the Lams ===
- 2011:Anarchy or Death (album)

=== with Deadcuts ===
- 2014: Dark is the Night (album)
- 2018: Hit on all Sixess (album)
- 2016: “Aries” Flatbush Zombies featuring Deadcuts (single )

=== as Mark Keds ===
- 2016: "Candle for Nietsche" (EP)

=== with the Herbaliser ===
- 2018: "Twenty Years to the Day" on Bring Out the Sound album (featured vocalist)
