= 3.11: Surviving Japan =

- Film poster
- Directed by: Christopher Noland
- Written by: Christopher Noland
- Produced by: Simon Hilton
- Starring: Kouichi Oyama; Chris Noland; Helen Caldicott (archive); Yumie Keller; Hisako Miura; Yuka Nihei; Kimiaki Toda; Katsunobu Sakurai
- Narrated by: Christopher Noland
- Cinematography: Christopher Noland
- Edited by: Andrea Hale; MB X. McClain
- Music by: Yoko Ono, Joel F. Wilson, Dimiter Yordanov
- Production companies: 3.11 Productions, Inc
- Distributed by: 3.11 Productions, inc (USA and Worldwide), Stand, Inc and Eleven Arts JP (Japan, Taiwan)
- Release dates: March 10, 2012 (Simon Fraser University); March 11, 2013
- Running time: 90 minutes
- Countries: Japan; United States
- Languages: English; Japanese

3.11: Surviving Japan is a documentary film about the 2011 Tōhoku earthquake and tsunami and the Fukushima Daiichi nuclear disaster in Japan written and directed by volunteer and resident Christopher Noland.

== Content ==
The film spans from March 11, 2011 to September 19, 2011, starting with Noland's own experience in the Tōhoku earthquake and tsunami, and the Fukushima Daiichi nuclear disaster, followed by volunteer activities in Ofunato. After meeting with volunteers and residents of the affected region that stated huge oversights in the disaster management, Noland continued to volunteer while going on an investigative journey through the Tōhoku region. He set out to Minamisōma, Fukushima near the crippled Fukushima Daiichi Nuclear Power Plant to speak to the Mayor who had appeared on YouTube with a distress call that the Japanese Government had neglected the town during the Fukushima Daiichi nuclear disaster. He then returned north to the Miyagi Prefecture to interview officials about the crisis management of the tsunami victims.

While on the same food delivery mission that May, he met a woman in Ishinomaki that had been denied food and shelter, stating she felt thrown away as a Japanese citizen, which led him to further investigate and document the events.

Noland went back to Tokyo, where he interviewed Tokyo Electric Power Company in an effort to gain a better understanding of the impact of the disaster. Unsatisfied with the little amount of information, he went on to interview more residents who shared the same frustration.

In June Noland returned to the Tōhoku region to volunteer and see how the people, communities, officials and cities were coping with the rebuilding efforts and radiation. He spent the entire summer visiting the largely hit communities of Miyako, Kamaishi, back to Ōfunato, Rikuzentakata, Kesennuma, Minami Sanriku and Ishinomaki, which led him to further investigate and document the events.

By August Noland saw another distress call from Minamisōma again on YouTube, this time from a city councilman. Noland contacted the councilman through the volunteer network and arranged a meeting after checking on citizens affected by high levels of radiation in Fukushima city and Kōriyama. It was Noland's conclusion that despite everything, he felt the media had most importantly ignored the children's safety due to radioactive contamination and further awareness of the Fukushima Daiichi nuclear disaster.

Making appearances in the film are Helen Caldicott, founder of PSR; professor Cham Dallas, a disaster management specialist; Kimiaki Toda, Mayor of Ofunato; Tokyo Electric Power Company, owner and operator of Fukushima Daiichi Nuclear Power Plant; Katsunobu Sakurai, Mayor of Minamisōma and Kouichi Oyama, City Councilman of Minamisōma.

== Production ==
3.11: Surviving Japan was conceived, directed, filmed and narrated by Christopher Noland. The executive producer was Simon Hilton; producers were Q'orianka Kilcher, Dave Parrish and Noland; the cinematographer was Noland; editing was done by Noland, MB X. McClain and Andrea Hale; the sound editor and mixer was Scott Delaney; "Kurushi" by Yoko Ono contributed to the soundtrack.

The documentary was made in exactly one year. Noland began the project as a one-man crew until September when he was joined by MB X. McClain to edit over 100 hours of footage down to 180 minutes until Noland moved back to the United States in late November to finish post-production with editor Andrea Hale. Noland credits the moral support of Yoko Ono, Simon Hilton, and Imaginepeace.com for their undying support during his one-man production.

3.11: Surviving Japan had its first pre-screening at Simon Fraser University on March 10, 2012 for the one-year anniversary of the disaster. The film was Officially released on March 11, 2013 and Premiered at Laemmle Noho 7 Theatre North Hollywood, CA with coverage by NHK World and AMC Theatres in San Diego, San Francisco and New York City. The film Premiered in Osaka, Japan at Cinema 7 in 2014.

== Reception ==
3.11 Surviving Japan was immediately picked up by Yoko Ono's Imagine Peace Website, won the Indiewire project of the week, and Noland won the YouTube Nextup Contest in 2011 using clips from the film. CBC Radio's The Current CBC Television interviewed Yumie Keller, an evacuee from Minamisōma who appeared in the film.

The film received considerable press coverage from Vancouver, Canada and Noland's birthplace in Washington state. Noland was interviewed on television by NBC King5 Seattle, NHK World News, and RT News. NHK did a feature segment which appeared on the Japanese 11'oclock News on the 2nd Anniversary of the Tohoku Earthquake and Tsunami. The Premiere was in the LAWeekly and was promoted by Yoko Ono, Q'orianka Kilcher and Jared Leto for the Los Angeles Premiere.

The film is also available in the Yamagata International Documentary Film Festival archive as an educational and historical documentary.
