= Simon Hilton =

- Born: 1967 (age 58–59); Bournemouth, England
- Occupation: Music video director
- Years active: 1992 - present
- Website: http://revl8.com

Simon Hilton (born 1967 near Bournemouth) is a Grammy Award-winning and triple Webby Award-winning British music video, concert and documentary director and editor, art director, and multimedia creative based in London, UK.

== Early life and career ==
Hilton grew up surrounded by science and theatre, as his father was a nuclear scientist and director of the Jack Hylton-owned Adelphi Theatre in London. He studied classical music & theory from age 7. In 1980, he was awarded a classical music scholarship to Canford School.

After working in London and graduating with honours from Ravensbourne College in 1989, Hilton apprenticed his editing skills at London post-production houses 625 and Rushes. In 1992 he began a freelance editing career, specialising in music-based content. He has to date edited over 350 music videos. From 1992-99, his directing career also flourished at Red Star Films and at The Artists Company, directing a number of videos for Robbie Williams and other prominent EMI and Polydor artists.

He has directed videos featuring, amongst others John Lennon, Yoko Ono, Paul McCartney, George Harrison, The Beatles, Robbie Williams, Kylie Minogue, Supergrass, Delakota. William Orbit and Ether. Editing credits include David Bowie, The Chemical Brothers, Nick Cave, Oasis, Led Zeppelin, Depeche Mode and Supergrass. Current projects include music videos & documentaries, live concerts, concert projections, art films, books, music box sets, website design, internet multimedia and archive restoration & development through his agency, REVL8 Ltd.

He has worked with Yoko Ono for over twenty-three years (since directing the Lennon Legend DVD Collection in 2003) for her; managing hers and John Lennon’s multimedia archives, online presences and physical production for Lennon. Since 2016, in collaboration with Yoko and Sean Ono Lennon he has researched, compiled, edited and produced all the Thames & Hudson / John & Yoko books series (John & Yoko/Plastic Ono Band, Imagine John Yoko, Mind Games) and the Universal Music / John Lennon (The Ultimate Collection) audio box sets for John Lennon/Plastic Ono Band, Imagine, Gimme Some Truth, Mind Games and Power To The People and is currently working on Walls and Bridges, and other music, book, film website and multimedia projects.

== Directing credits ==
Sources: - IMDB - IMVDb - REVL8.com

=== Music videos ===
Sources: - IMDB - IMVDb - REVL8.com

- Ed Harcourt: 'Black Feathers'
- Ed Harcourt: 'Russian Roulette'
- Supergrass: 'Diamond Hoo Ha Man' (co-director)
- George Harrison: 'Any Road'
- The Beatles: 'Within You Without You/Tomorrow Never Knows'
- Paul McCartney: 'Chaos and Creation in the Backyard' DVD
- Supergrass: 'Supergrass is 10' DVD
- John Lennon: 'Lennon Legend' DVD
- Relish: 'Rainbow Zephyr'
- Dum Dums: 'Army of Two'
- Robbie Williams & Kylie Minogue: 'Kids' (2002 Brit Award nomination - Best Video)
- David Holmes: '69 Police'
- Alice Cooper: 'Gimme'
- Robbie Williams: 'Dance with the Devil' (1st ever multichannel DVD promo)
- Precious: 'Stand Up'
- Stephen Gately: 'A New Beginning'
- Robbie Williams: 'It's Only Us' (2000 LEAF Best Music Video nomination)
- Medal: 'Porno Song'
- Robbie Williams: 'Angels' live at Manchester Arena
- Robbie Williams: 'Millennium' live at Manchester Arena
- Robbie Williams: 'Strong'
- Medal: 'Up Here For Hours'
- Delakota: '555'
- Delakota: 'C'mon Cincinnati'
- Ether: 'Best Friend'
- Satellite Beach: 'Psycho'
- Ether: 'She Could Fly'
- Iron Maiden: 'The Angel & The Gambler'
- Radiator: 'I Am'
- Ether: 'If You If Really Want To Know'
- Naimee Coleman: 'Care About You'
- Grass~Show: '1962'
- Eternal: 'Secrets'
- Planet Claire: 'Say'
- Planet Claire: '21'
- Iron Maiden: 'Man on the Edge' (Live in Israel)
- Morrissey: 'Hold Onto Your Friends'
- William Orbit: 'Strange Cargo III' longform

=== Music Longforms / Concerts / DVDs ===
Sources: - IMDB - IMVDb - REVL8.com

- Diamond Hoo Ha Men: 'Glange Fever' Rockumentary (30 mins) (co-director)
- Diamond Hoo Ha Men: 'Glange Fever' Reflux - The Outtakes (Parts One to Fore!) (co-director)
- Diamond Hoo Ha Men: 'Glange Fever' The Tour (9 Tracks) (co-director)
- Paul McCartney: 'Chaos and Creation at Abbey Road' (60 min concert)
- Paul McCartney: 'Creating Chaos at Abbey Road' (30 min making-of)
- Paul McCartney: 'Chaos and Creation in the Backyard' DVD
- Yoko Ono: 'Live at All Tomorrows Parties', Camber Sands
- Supergrass: 'Supergrass is 10' DVD
- John Lennon: 'Lennon Legend' DVD (20 videos & 5 extra features)
- Robbie Williams: 2 x versions of 'Rock, DJ' for website
- Robbie Williams: 19 x 'ROB TV' inserts for Slaine DVD
- Robbie Williams: 'Angels' DVD
- Robbie Williams: 'Karma Killer' – Stage projections for World Tour
- Robbie Williams: 'Kids'– Stage projections for World Tour
- William Orbit: 'Strange Cargo 3' longform (6 x videos)
- Ashley Maher: 'Pomegranate' longform (5 x videos)

=== Films and documentaries ===
Sources: - IMDB - IMVDb - REVL8.com

- Yoko Ono: 'IMAGINE PEACE TOWER' documentary
- Yoko Ono: 'Passages For Light' documentary
- Yoko Ono: 'Yoko Ono in Moscow/Odyssey of A Cockroach' documentary
- Diamond Hoo Ha Men: 'Glange Fever' Rockumentary (30 mins)
- John Lennon & Yoko Ono: 'War Is Over! (If You Want It)' (10 mins)
- Paul McCartney: 'Between Chaos and Creation' (30 mins)
- Paul McCartney: 'Chaos and Creation in the Backyard' (30 min TV – VH1 & Channel 4)
- Paul McCartney: 'Paul McCartney at Live 8: Onstage & Backstage'
- Yoko Ono: 'Onochord' documentary
- Yoko Ono: 'The Tate Gallery Lecture' (100 mins)
- Supergrass: 'A Home Movie' (feature length)
- Keith Urban: 'Days Go By'
- Pink Floyd: 'The Making of The Dark Side of the Moon' SACD 30th Anniversary
- Robbie Williams: 'Life Thru A Lens'
- 'Gumball 3000': documentary of 1999 European Classic Car rally/race.

=== EPKs and miscellaneous ===
Sources: - IMDB - IMVDb - REVL8.com

- Paul McCartney "Good Evening New York City" Press Launch
- Paul McCartney / The Fireman "Electric Arguments" Press Launch
- EMI/Capitol/Virgin: Conference 2008
- EMI/Capitol/Virgin: Conference 2007
- EMI/Capitol/Virgin: Dublin Conference 2006
- Paul McCartney "Chaos and Creation in the Backyard USA" EPK
- Paul McCartney "Chaos and Creation in the Backyard UK" EPK
- EMI/Capitol/Virgin: New York Conference 2005
- Keith Urban "Days Go By" European EPK
- EMI/Capitol/Virgin: Global Marketing Conference Toronto 2004
- EMI/Capitol/Virgin: Global Marketing Conference Barcelona 2003
- Filippa Giordano: 'Il Rosso Amore' EPK
- Pink Floyd: 'Echoes' EPK
- Manic Street Preachers: Reading 2001 Back Projections
- EMI:Chrysalis Records: UK Retail Conference 2001
- EMI:Chrysalis Records: Barcelona Conference 2000
- Precious: Debut Album EPK
- Manic Street Preachers: V99 Stage walk-on tape
- The Beatles: Yellow Submarine EPK
- EMI International Records UK: South East Asia Conference 1999
- EMI Chrysalis Records: June Conference 98
- Chrysalis Records: EMI 100 Conference presentation & I.D.

=== Stage Screens (films made to accompany live performances) ===
Sources: - IMDB - IMVDb - REVL8.com

- Paul McCartney: 'Eleanor Rigby'
- Paul McCartney: 'I Want To Come Home'
- Paul McCartney: 'Sgt. Pepper'
- Paul McCartney: 'Back in the USSR'
- Yoko Ono: 'at the Bluecoat' - April 2008 performance
- Paul McCartney: 'Live And Let Die' & 'Get Back' - Brits 2008 performances
- Live Earth concert: 7 July 2007 - films
