= Cass Browne =

English musician and author (born 1971)

- Born: Cassian Ingmar Browne; 27 September 1971 (age 55); Wimbledon, Surrey, England
- Genres: Alternative rock; electronic; Britpop; trip hop
- Occupations: Musician; Author
- Instruments: Drums; Percussion
- Years active: 1986–present

Cass Browne (born 27 September 1971 in Wimbledon, Surrey) is an English musician and writer. He was a member of the bands Senseless Things, Delakota, Penguin Cafe, Deadcuts, and Loup GarouX. He was also a back-up drummer for Gorillaz.

== Career ==
In 1986, Browne became a member of the band Senseless Things. Senseless Things made four studio albums, achieved two UK Top 20 hits and released many other singles in their nine years together, before splitting up in 1995. Jamie Hewlett of Blur and later Gorillaz was a big fan of the band and designed many of their sleeves.

When Senseless Things split up, Browne formed a new band Delakota, which he toured with for a couple of years. Delakota made their first live appearance on Newsnight and released the album One Love in 1998, tracks from which received remixes from Fatboy Slim, David Holmes, the pre-UNKLE producer Tim Goldsworthy, Royal Trux, the artist Four Tet (under his "Joshua Falken" moniker), Freddy Fresh and others. In 2022 the album saw a Deluxe Digital Edition release, alongside the original remixes and B-Sides. A visual was released for the Fatboy Slim remix of the single "C'mon Cincinnati" in September 2022, which was assembled from recovered footage of the first Delakota concert in 1998, performed "200ft underground" at the Hellfire Caves in High Wycombe.

Browne performed with Urge Overkill for the promotion of the band’s single "Girl, You’ll Be a Woman Soon" taken from the soundtrack of the Quentin Tarantino film "Pulp Fiction". He also played drums for Damon Albarn's 2002 album Mali Music.

Browne was an important member of the Gorillaz family from his addition in 2001, until his departure in 2012. From 2001 to 2010, he provided drums and drum machines on Gorillaz’ Gorillaz (album) and Demon Days. He performed at all dates on Gorillaz live shows and appears on Demon Days Live behind the drums at the Manchester Opera House. He performed on the 2010 The Escape to Plastic Beach Tour debuting at The Coachella Valley Music and Arts Festival in Palm Springs, on 18 April 2010. The live band were now joined by additional musicians such as Lou Reed, Snoop Dogg, Bobby Womack, Neneh Cherry, Mark E. Smith, Hypnotic Brass Ensemble, De La Soul, Mos Def, Bootie Brown, Little Dragon, Shaun Ryder, Bashy and Kano, Gruff Rhys of Super Furry Animals, The Syrian National Orchestra for Arabic Music and more. Performances were the undertaken throughout the year with a headlining spot at 2010’s Glastonbury Festival. The world tour would take in appearances across Europe, the U.S., China, Australia and New Zealand, with additional headline concerts at the Roskilde and Benicassim festivals.

Browne was the author of all the dialogue of the band members, penning the autobiography Rise of the Ogre in 2006 and writing dialogue such as MEL's website tour in Phase One: Celebrity Take Down in 2002. He chiefly writes all the interviews as the characters for magazines who wish to interview Noodle, 2D, Russel and Murdoc. He co-wrote and co-directed the 2001 mock-documentary "Charts of Darkness" on Gorillaz for Channel 4 in association with Dazed TV, and hosted by Krishnan Guru-Murthy. This was subsequently licensed to MTV and shown worldwide. He also wrote, voice-directed and was the musical supervisor for the Gorillaz episode of MTV Cribs, which featured Murdoc Niccals showing the viewers around the Gorillaz Kong Studio. The video aired on 26 December 2005.

With Gorillaz he worked on the campaigns and collaborations with 3 Mobile, Motorola, Microsoft and Converse. The collaboration with Converse was a part their "Three Artists. One Song" project, which commissioned the Gorillaz track DoYaThing featuring LCD Soundsystem frontman James Murphy and André 3000 of Outkast.

He is also featured in the film Bananaz, which documents the journey of the Gorillaz band from 2001 until 2005, playing in the studio and live.

From 2009 to 2019, Browne was a member of the reimagined Penguin Cafe, originally conceived by Arthur Jeffes, son of Simon Jeffes and Emily Young, as a continuation of his father's project the Penguin Cafe Orchestra. Penguin Cafe appeared at various festivals, theatre venues and Arts events and were frequent visitors to Japan.

In 2016, Browne joined east London band Deadcuts, which also features former Senseless Things frontman Mark Keds, but has since taken an extended leave from the group.

Alongside original Senseless Things member Morgan Nicholls, Delakota partner Des Murphy and guitarist Ade Emsley, Browne formed Circle 60, a "neuer Klang sonic-assemblage of psychedelic-punk, art and Sci-fi melodics". They released their debut album "Sawnoff ShotGold" in 2018.

In 2019 he formed alternative rock supergroup Loup GarouX, with Mercury-nominated songwriter Ed Harcourt and Richard Jones of The Feeling. The Loup GarouX track "Sleep Forever" was featured as the title and show music for the ITV2 zombie-apocalypse show "Zomboat!" The first official single 'I Know The Truth About You' received airplay from BBC Radio 1 and BBC 6 Music.

Loup GarouX made their first live appearance On 21 February 2020 at Glasgow’s Barrowland Ballroom as support to the recently reformed Supergrass on their UK Tour. This culminated in two nights at London’s Alexandra Palace venue, on 6 and 7 March.

Loup GarouX are to release their debut album “Strangerlands” - written, recorded and produced by the band at Harcourt’s Wolf Cabin studio - in October 2021. The album is mixed by Cenzo Townshend.

== Selected discography ==
=== with Senseless Things ===
- 1989: Postcard C.V. (album)
- 1991: The First of Too Many (album)
- 1993: Empire of the Senseless (album)
- 1994: Peel Sessions (compilation)
- 1995: Taking Care of Business (album)
- 1998: The Singles (compilation)
- 2022: The First of Too Many - 30th Anniversary Edition (album)

=== with Delakota ===
- 1998: One Love (album)
- 2022: One Love - Deluxe Edition (album)

=== with Damon Albarn ===
- 2002: Mali Music (album)

=== with Gorillaz ===
- 2001: Gorillaz (album)
- 2005: Demon Days
- 2006: Demon Days: Live at the Manchester Opera House (Live album / DVD)

=== with Penguin Cafe ===
- 2009: Live At The Royal Albert Hall (album)
- 2011: A Matter of Life... (album)
- 2014: The Red Book (album)
- 2017: The Imperfect Sea (album)
- 2019: Handfuls of Night (album)

=== with Deadcuts ===
- 2018: Hit on All Sixxes (album)

=== with Circle60 ===
- 2018: SawnOff ShotGold (album)

=== with Loup GarouX ===
- 2021: Strangerlands (album)
