= Alison Brady =

American photographer

Alison Brady is a Brooklyn-based photographer known for her Sweet Affliction and What Remains Secret series. Born in Cleveland, Ohio, she graduated from the School of Visual Arts in 2006 with an MFA in Photography.

Brady's work has been featured in The New York Times, NY Arts Magazine, and Time Out New York. The New York Times' Whitney Richardson wrote, "Her images are carefully structured to blend the familiar with the unknown — antique furniture and vintage fabrics juxtaposed with unnaturally twisted body forms — with the hope of getting viewers to ask one question: 'I know these objects, but why does this all feel so foreign?'" Her photography is featured in many private and public collections including Elton John's collection and the West Collection. Saatchi Gallery profiled her as an emerging artist of the week in 2007.

Her exhibition "Sincerely Yours" was pointed out as taking extensively from René Magritte's work. In 2016, Brady's photos from her 2011 exhibition, "Sincerely Yours", were used as the cover artwork of American post-punk / gothic rock band Damien Done's EP Stay Black. Other images from that exhibition were used as the cover artwork to the band's next three singles, "He Really Tried"/"And Now The Rain", "Curious Thing"/"Primitive" and "Everybody Loves You (When You're Dead)"/"Pretty Boy".

== Sweet Affliction ==
Brady's Sweet Affliction series captures young women in domestic, nostalgic settings, while embracing both commonplace and carnal elements. In her review of the show, Roberta Smith of The New York Times wrote, "Ms. Brady's work deals rather explicitly and hilariously with the female predicament."

== Solo exhibitions ==
- What Remains Secret, Rick Wester Fine Art (2014)
- Sincerely Yours, Hous Projects (2011)
- An Uncertain Nature, Massimo Audiello (2009)
- Sweet Affliction, Massimo Audiello (2007)
