= Senseless Things =

English pop punk band

- Origin: London
- Genres: Pop punk; fraggle; punk rock; indie rock; alternative rock
- Years active: 1986–1995, 2017
- Labels: Epic; Way Cool; Decoy; Cherry Red
- Past members: Mark Keds; Ben Harding; Morgan Nicholls; Cass Browne
- Website: https://www.senseless-things.com/

Senseless Things were an English pop punk band, formed in 1986 in London. The band released four studio albums and achieved two UK Top 20 hit singles before splitting up in 1995. Senseless Things reformed in 2017 to play several gigs including Shepherd's Bush Empire, as well as to record and release new material. Vocalist Mark Keds died in early 2021.

== History ==
=== Career ===
Senseless Things formed around the musical partnership of songwriter Mark Myers aka Mark Keds (vocals, guitar) and Morgan Nicholls (bass, originally guitar), who as 11-year-olds in Twickenham, Middlesex put together Wild Division in the early 1980s. With the addition of drummer Cass Browne (also occasionally known as Cass Cade, Cass Traitor, Cass Vegas or Blousey Browne) they became the Psychotics, playing various venues in their local area despite still being at school. Their first gig together as the Senseless Things (named after a phrase used in Shakespeare's A Midsummer Night's Dream and Julius Caesar) followed at the subsequently-demolished Clarendon in Hammersmith, London, in October 1986. Auxiliary members at this stage included a keyboard player, Ben, and a guitarist, Gerry, who deputised for Nicholls while the latter was studying for his O levels.

The definitive Senseless Things line-up formed in summer 1987 when Nicholls returned to take over bass, with the new recruit, former BBC clerk Ben Harding, acquiring the vacant guitarist's role. The band regularly appeared at The Clarendon in Hammersmith, London playing both downstairs in the Broadway bar and upstairs in the main auditorium. The quartet embarked upon a hectic touring schedule, often playing on the same bill as Mega City Four, Snuff and Perfect Daze.

The band's first releases were singles given away with issues of Yo Jo Jo and Sniffin' Rock fanzines. By March 1988 the band had attracted the attention of the BBC Radio 1 DJ John Peel, who invited them to record the first of three sessions for his programme. The "Up And Coming" 12-inch followed, then "Girlfriend" the following year, both on Way Cool Records.

Their first album, Postcard CV, was released in 1989, capturing the energy of their concerts by packing 10 tracks into 21 minutes. Record Collector called it "sprightly pop-punk/ indie with touches of Buzzcocks and the Undertones". The album was rounded off by "Too Much Kissing", which was released as a single and was to become their signature track.

In 1990 the band signed with What Goes On Records, just as the label collapsed, resulting in an abortive EP release. The band then signed to Vinyl Solution subsidiary Decoy Records, who released the four-track EP "'Is It Too Late?", produced by Jon Langford of the Mekons.

The group stayed with Decoy for "Can't Do Anything", (also produced by Langford), which prefaced an appearance at the Reading Festival; the band then signed to Epic Records at the start of 1991.

The subsequent album The First Of Too Many saw the band experimenting with other styles including acoustic songs, and the single "Got It At The Delmar" entered the Top 50 of the UK Singles Chart. Allmusic praised the album's blend of "bubblegum pop" and "gobstopping hard rock", likening the band's sound to the Who and the Replacements. Two further Top 20 singles followed in 1991/1992 – "Easy To Smile" and "Hold It Down". The band toured the United States, supporting Blur, and went to Japan for the first time, appearing on talent show Ika-Ten.

Cover art for the first two Senseless Things albums and most single releases around the same period was provided by comic artist Jamie Hewlett, creator of Tank Girl and later Gorillaz.

The second single from their third album, 1993's Empire of the Senseless, "Homophobic Asshole" (with promotional video directed by Steven Wells) received critical acclaim but was released reluctantly by their record company due to the band's choice of title and failed to chart highly. Follow-up single, "Primary Instinct", an equally political (anti-racist) lyric but a more radio-friendly title, had slightly more commercial success. In a further Mekons connection, the album shared its title with a track from the 1989 album The Mekons Rock 'n Roll, itself named after a Kathy Acker novel.

In 1995, the band released a final album, Taking Care of Business accompanied by two singles, "Christine Keeler" (renamed from "Christian Killer") and "Something To Miss". The latter's B-sides included a Replacements cover as well as a song co-written with Lenie from Mambo Taxi. Senseless Things went into permanent hiatus the same year after farewell tours of the UK and Japan.

=== Post-breakup ===
Keds very briefly became a member of The Wildhearts before forming Jolt, Trip Fontaine, The Lams, Like A Bitch and, most recently, Deadcuts. He also has a co-writer credit on The Libertines' 2004 #2 hit "Can't Stand Me Now", which took a line from the 1998 Jolt single "Hey! Kitten".

Harding went on to join 3 Colours Red in their original incarnation from 1996 to 1999, before pursuing a career in public and media relations. Making a return to music, Harding now plays in garage band The Charlemagnes.

Nicholls joined Vent 414 with Miles Hunt from The Wonder Stuff until 1997, released the solo album Organized in 2000, then went on to play with The Streets. He is now part of Muse's touring line-up and has also played with Lily Allen and The Who.

Browne formed new band Delakota with Nicholls and others, releasing an album and various singles between 1998 and 2000. He went on to become a central collaborator of Hewlett and Damon Albarn's virtual band Gorillaz, playing drums in various live incarnations of the band from 2001 to 2010 and also serving as one of the primary writers for the animated characters in interviews and cartoon shorts, including the 2005 book Rise of the Ogre (Nicholls also played bass in the Gorillaz live band from 2005 to 2006). Browne also briefly played with Urge Overkill, The Lams and Deadcuts. In 2019 he formed alternative rock supergroup Loup GarouX, with Mercury-nominated songwriter Ed Harcourt, and Richard Jones of The Feeling. The single "I Know the Truth About You" received airplay from BBC Radio 1 and BBC 6 Music.

=== Reunions ===
Senseless Things reformed (minus Nicholls, who was unavailable and replaced by Micky Wyle, ex-Hitechjet) for a secret (billed as Mark Keds) four-song performance at Islington Academy, London on 4 March 2007 – over 12 years after the band last performed – as part of a gig to celebrate the life of former Mega City Four frontman Darren "Wiz" Brown, who died in December 2006. The same band members had an impromptu reunion in June 2016 when they joined fans Beach Slang live on stage in London to perform their cover of "Too Much Kissing".

In December 2016, a full Senseless Things reunion concert was announced for 25 March 2017. A warm-up date was later announced for Hull on 19 March. A one-sided 7-inch single with new recording "Lost Honey" was released to mark the concerts, the band's first new material in 22 years.

Frontman Mark Keds died on 10 January 2021; he was 50 years old.

== Influences and legacy ==
Senseless Things cited influences including the Stupids, Dag Nasty, Hüsker Dü, Descendents, the Space Maggots, Perfect Daze, the Ramones, the Replacements, Magazine, Wire, Buzzcocks, the Cure, Sonic Youth, Squeeze, Blondie, New York Dolls, Mega City Four, Snuff, Soul Asylum, Urge Orverkill, Redd Kross, Psychedelic Furs, Peter Perrett, the Meters, Funkadelic and Ween. Later in their career they cited Tad, Nirvana and Mudhoney, and specifically on Empire of the Senseless (1992), they began to take influence from Neil Young and Fugazi.

Senseless Things have been cited as an influence by Beach Slang, Supergrass and Ash.

== Members ==
- Mark Keds – vocals/guitar
- Ben Harding – guitar/vocals
- Morgan Nicholls – bass
- Cass Browne – drums

== Discography ==
=== Albums ===
- Postcard C.V. (1989) – LP, MC, CD – Way Cool (WC 004 LP)
- The First of Too Many (1991) – LP (black vinyl), LP (purple vinyl), CD, MC – Epic – UK No. 66
- Empire of the Senseless (1992) – CD – Epic – UK No. 37
  - Empire of the Senseless/Postcard C.V. (1993) – Double LP, double CD, MC – Epic
- Peel Sessions (1994) – CD – Strange Fruit
- Taking Care of Business (1995) – CD, LP – Epic

=== Compilations ===
- The Singles (1998) – CD – Epic
- Postcard C.V. (2010) – CD – Cherry Red (re-issue inc. tracks from "Up and Coming" 12-inch & "Girlfriend" 7-inch)
- Last One Out The Window (CD/LP) (Andy in a Karmann remaster and previously unreleased Gallery Tapes)

=== Live albums ===
- The First of Too Many (2022) - 3CD/2LP - Cherry Red (re-issue, plus remixed album and Live at Camden Palace)

=== Singles/EPs ===
- 1988 – "I'm Moving" 7-inch flexi
- 1988 – Up & Coming EP, 12-inch (re-released 12-inch/CDs, 1991)
- 1989 – "Senseless Things" – rehearsals bootleg 7-inch
- 1989 – "Girlfriend" 7-inch
- 1989 – "Too Much Kissing" 7-inch UK No. 167
- 1990 – Andi In A Karmann EP, 12-inch (promo only)
- 1990 – "Is it Too Late?" UK No. 134
- 1990 – "Can't Do Anything" UK No. 146
- 1991 – "Everybody's Gone" – UK No. 73
- 1991 – "Got it at the Delmar" – UK No. 50
- 1991 – "Easy to Smile" – UK No. 18
- 1992 – "Hold it Down" – UK No. 19
- 1992 – "Homophobic Asshole" – UK No. 52
- 1993 – "Primary Instinct" – UK No. 41
- 1993 – "Too Much Kissing" – UK No. 69 [remixed w/new artwork & b-sides]
- 1994 – "Christine Keeler" – UK No. 56
- 1995 – "Something to Miss" – UK No. 57
- 2017 – "Lost Honey"

=== Selected compilation appearances ===
- 1988 – "Sniffin' Rock #6" – split 7-inch w/ Crazyhead, The Birdhouse
- 1989 – "Pssst" EP – split 7-inch w/ Snuff, Sink, Perfect Daze
- 1989 – "The Shape Of Things to Humm" – split 7-inch w/ Perfect Daze, Playground, Exit Condition
- 1989 – Underground Rockers Volume 2 – LP (reissued on CD, 1992) w/ Manic Street Preachers, HDQ, The Price, etc.
- 1991 – "Submerge #3" – split 7-inch flexi w/ Bugeyes
