= Deadcuts =

English post-punk group

- Origin: London, England
- Genres: Gothic rock, post-punk, alternative rock, new wave
- Years active: 2012–present
- Label: Speedowax Records
- Members: Jerome Alexandre; Aaron Scars; Luigi Rampino
- Past members: Mark Keds; Cass Browne (2015-2017); Joseph Johns (2015-2017); Mark McCarthy; Trevor Sharpe
- Website: www.deadcuts.co.uk

Deadcuts were an English post punk group formed in 2012 by former Senseless Things front man, Mark Keds (vocals/guitar) and Jerome Alexandre (guitar/backing vocals). Keds was also known for his previous work with The Wildhearts and Jolt, as well as co-writing The Libertines' "Can't Stand Me Now".

The group released their debut album, Dark Is The Night, in 2014 on Speedowax Records.

After the departure of members Mark McCarthy (Radical Dance Faction, The Wonder Stuff) and Trevor Sharpe (Miranda Sex Garden), the group were joined by ex-Senseless Things and Gorillaz drummer Cass Browne and bass player Joseph Johns.

The band supported The Libertines at their surprise Dublin Castle gig and again in January 2016 at their Greenwich O2 Arena show in London. In the same month they were joined on stage by Andy MacKay (Roxy Music) and Charlotte Glasson (Nick Cave and the Bad Seeds, Herbie Flowers) for a rendition of David Bowie’s "V2 Schneider" and "Lazarus" as part of a David Bowie Tribute concert in aid of Cancer Research UK at London's Bush Hall, alongside other artists including Sophie Ellis Bextor, Graham "Suggs" McPherson, Jay Mehler (Kasabian), Ed Harcourt, Nick McCarthy (Franz Ferdinand). They also performed at a fundraiser show for former Mega City Four frontman Wiz in the same week.

The band supported Pete Doherty on various dates during his Eudamonia tour in 2016 with Doherty joining the band on stage. Other supports during this time included Fat White Family and Beach Slang, with several members of Senseless Things and Deadcuts joining Beach Slang on stage during their encore.

Deadcuts collaborated with New York hip hop group Flatbush Zombies on the track "Aries", in November 2016 and the track was also used in the Marvel Comics Black Panther: A Nation Under Our Feet series.

Aaron Scars replaced Joseph Johns on bass in early 2017. The band toured in 2017 with former Tommy Stinson of The Replacements band, Bash & Pop, as well as supporting The Libertines in Brighton. Cass Browne went on extended leave from the band in July 2017.

In February 2018, the band released their second album, Hit On All Sixxes, which received rave reviews from Classic Rock, Mojo, Louder than war, Gigwise and more. Although it had been completed a year earlier, its release was held up for various reasons. The album featured guest appearances by John Perry (The Only Ones), Charlotte Glasson, Morgan Nicholls (Muse, Senseless Things) and Raven Bush.

This followed a series of performances where Deadcuts supported Christian Death at Camden Underworld in April 2018 and Killing Joke at Nottingham Rock City in November 2018, where producer and Killing Joke bassist Martin "Youth" Glover watched their performance and was impressed enough to offer to mix their next album. Recordings took place at Konk studios for a third album provisionally titled 'Reveal the Love'. In March 2019, Deadcuts released a split 7-inch vinyl with American post-punk band Damien Done through Speedowax Records.

Mark Keds died on 10 January 2021.

== Selected discography ==
=== Albums ===
- Dark is the Night (2014)
- Hit on All Sixxes (2018)
