= Vent 414 =

British independent rock band of the 1990s

- Origin: London
- Genres: Alternative rock
- Years active: 1994–1997, 2024-
- Labels: Polydor; Universal
- Members: Miles Hunt; Morgan Nicholls; Pete Howard
- Past members: Billy Duffy; Malcolm Treece

Vent 414 are a British independent rock band who were active for a few years in the 1990s, before reforming in 2024.

Their line-up featured artists who played in numerous prominent bands: Miles Hunt in The Wonder Stuff, Billy Duffy in The Cult, and Morgan Nicholls in Senseless Things, The Streets, and Muse. Drummer Pete Howard played for The Clash and Eat.

== History ==
The band, originally called 'Vent', started to collaborate in December 1994, and received considerable media attention, mostly because of the presence of Hunt, with the result that they were invited to produce a session for Radio 1 before they had recorded anything at all. They first played live at the 1995 Reading Festival, before touring the U.S., and returning for a UK tour supporting Therapy? Duffy left the band shortly before this tour.

A full UK headlining tour followed to support the release of their self-titled album, produced by Steve Albini, in 1996. By this time the band had been forced to change their name, because of the threat of legal action by an American band of the same name.

In early 1997, Nicholls left, stating dissatisfaction with Polydor's promotion of the group, and indeed, shortly afterwards the group was dropped. Ex-Wonder Stuff guitarist Malcolm Treece was recruited, but after attempting unsuccessfully to garner record label support for a second album, Hunt folded the group. He and Treece have continued to work together since in the reformed Wonder Stuff.

In 2020 Hunt confirmed that he planning to reform the band with Nicholls, and they had been recording demos during the Coronavirus lockdowns. Tracks from this were released via Hunt's bandcamp page. In 2024 Hunt posted that he, Nicholls and Howard had been recording new material, and in December 2025 they played some shows supporting The Wonder Stuff which featured a handful of new songs with a new album set to be released in May 2026.

== Discography ==
Albums

- Vent 414 (1996)
- The Post Album Demos (2009)
- Second (2025)

Singles

- "Fixer" (1996) – UK No. 71
- "Life Before You" (1996) – UK No. 95
