= Delakota =

English alternative dance band

- Genres: Dance, Madchester, rock
- Years active: 1997–2000
- Labels: Go Beat
- Members: Cass Browne; Morgan Nicholls; Des Murphy; Brian Pearce

Delakota were an English alternative dance band from the late 1990s. The band mixed elements of Madchester, retro-rock, and modern dance music to produce a sound which was often compared to Primal Scream.

The band were formed by ex members of the Senseless Things, Cass Browne and Morgan Nicholls with Des Murphy (ex-Wasteland, Los Bastardos and Genius Freak) in 1997. The band's first product was a white label demo single, "C'mon Cincinnati". A remix for David Holmes and their next single "The Rock" bought them to the attention of the British music press. The band were also noted for an unusual gig in a cave and for an appearance on BBC Two's Newsnight.

The band played some support slots including a tour with Embrace, and a place on the NME new bands tour in 1998. Their debut album, One Love, was released in 1998 to generally positive reviews. After the release of the album, the band released two further singles, "555" (1999) and "Got It Like That" (2000), but have not been heard from since; it is presumed that the band had split up. As of 2004, Nicholls was playing keyboards in the Streets and Browne was playing drums for Gorillaz.

In 2008, Coldplay frontman Chris Martin claimed that Delakota's "The Rock" gave them inspiration for "Strawberry Swing".

== Personnel ==
- Cass Browne
- Morgan Nicholls
- Des Murphy
- Brian Pearce

== Discography ==
=== Albums ===
- One Love (21 September 1998) UK #58

=== Singles ===
- "The Rock" (July 1998) - UK #60
- "C'mon Cincinnati" - featuring Rose Smith (September 1998) - UK #55
- "555" (February 1999) - UK #42
- "Got It Like That" (August 2000) - UK #111
