= Charm Offensive =

- Charm Offensive standard cover art.

Studio album by Damien Done
- Released: March 2, 2018
- Recorded: 2016–2017
- Studio: Wisner Productions, St. Cloud, Florida; Cloud City Studio, Garden City, Michigan
- Genre: Post-punk; gothic rock
- Length: 41:15
- Label: Mind Over Matter
- Producer: James Paul Wisner; Damien Moyal

Damien Done chronology
Stay Black (2016)	Charm Offensive (2018)	Baby, Don't Hearse Me (2019)

Singles from Charm Offensive
- 1. "Curious Thing" Released: August 25, 2017; 2. "The Lord Fox" Released: January 13, 2018; 3. "Roof Access" Released: February 16, 2018

Test pressing cover art
- Charm Offensive test pressing cover art.

Deluxe Creep Kit edition cover art
- Charm Offensive Deluxe Creep Kit edition cover art.

Tour edition cover art
- Charm Offensive satin tour edition cover art.

Charm Offensive is the debut full-length album by American gothic rock/post-punk band Damien Done. Originally scheduled for release on February 16, 2018, by American record label Mind Over Matter Records, the digital version was pushed back to March 2, 2018, while the 12-inch vinyl version was delayed until April 26, 2018. Belgian record label Hypertension Records licensed the rights to issue the album on 12-inch vinyl for the European market, releasing its edition on August 10, 2018, to coincide with the band's European and British tour.

The band released three singles from Charm Offensive: "Curious Thing" on September 8, 2017 (though its music video premiered beforehand on August 25, 2017), "The Lord Fox" on January 13, 2018, and "Roof Access" on February 16, 2018. A fourth music video was also produced for the non-album Killing Joke cover "Primitive", which appeared on the b-side of "Curious Thing" and with the European edition of the album.

Founding band member and principal songwriter Damien Moyal performed, engineered and produced nearly all of the material on Charm Offensive, including lead and backing vocals, acoustic and electric guitars, synthesizers, piano, percussion, as well as programming drums and bass guitar. The material was then sent to mixing engineer James Paul Wisner, who wound up re-recording the programmed bass guitar parts with a real instrument and also added new guitar textures. Before the album was completed, Moyal began recruiting backing members to perform live, including drummer Benjamin Moore, guitarist Andrew Dempz, and bass guitarist Laura Jane Leonard.

In promotion of the release, Damien Done toured the United States, United Kingdom and Europe between July 2018 and April 2020, up until the American outbreak of the COVID-19 pandemic, which halted the band's live performances. The band also performed at notable festivals like Ieperfest in Ypres, Belgium, No Rest Festival in Detroit, Michigan and Iron Festival in Newport, Kentucky.

== Composition and recording ==
=== Background ===
Damien Moyal had previously fronted such hardcore punk, metallic hardcore and melodic hardcore bands as Culture, Shai Hulud, Morning Again, Bird of Ill Omen and As Friends Rust throughout the 1990s and early 2000s. After leaving Gainesville, Florida-based As Friends Rust in February 2002, Moyal began working on solo material for what would eventually become Damien Done. The band's first release, an extended play originally titled Love Thongs but ultimately renamed Stay Black, was recorded in September 2003, but remained unreleased and stuck in limbo through Belgian record label Good Life Recordings for thirteen years.

Once interest in releasing Stay Black was renewed by German record label Demons Run Amok Entertainment in 2015–2016, Moyal was driven to compose and record more material for the project. The timing also coincided with some free time Moyal had in between his reformed bands, Culture and As Friends Rust, and his new band, On Bodies', touring and recording schedules.

Having relocated to Ann Arbor, Michigan in September 2006, Moyal began writing and demoing new songs for Damien Done's planned debut full-length album without any help from other musicians, nor backing from a record label. In an interview conducted during the album's early demoing stage, Moyal admitted that he was usually self-conscious about writing music alone, but was happy with the new songs and the album's progress:

"I'm very happy with the songs for the album I'm currently writing. Right now I'm just writing and writing, and trying to figure out how to make the new album happen. At the rate that I've been writing and demoing, I'll have more songs than I need.

I'm usually too self-conscious to send works-in-progress to friends for feedback, so I just keep chipping away at a song until either I finally think it's good or I'm completely sick of it. Very often both of those things happen at the same time.

A lot of my parts were born from improvisation, and I try not to be too rigid about my process or sound. Some are big, full rock songs, some are acoustic, some of the newer songs are really piano-driven or use looped beats, but I think they still all somehow end up sounding like Damien Done. My process is pretty simple: I fuck around with my guitar until I have a song, or at least some parts to string together. I pick a tempo and program some drums. I record my guitars to those drums, then add bass guitar and finally vocals. Then I drive around listening to it in my car, find the things I hate, go home and fix them, repeat."

=== Song development ===
Moyal described the new songs as more structured than those from the Stay Black era, defining the album as a series of vignettes themed around voyeurism, secrecy, guilt and compulsion; a cold, uncomfortable landscape with a cinematic and noir approach. Moyal explained that he enjoyed writing about the aspects of relationships that didn't typically get addressed in popular songs. Speaking on the themes of the album, he noted:

"In most, if not all of the songs, the stories are left unresolved to enhance that sense of voyeurism. We're not getting whole, tidy stories, but walking past windows and seeing moments of threat, guilt or compulsion whose beginnings or endings we'll likely never know."

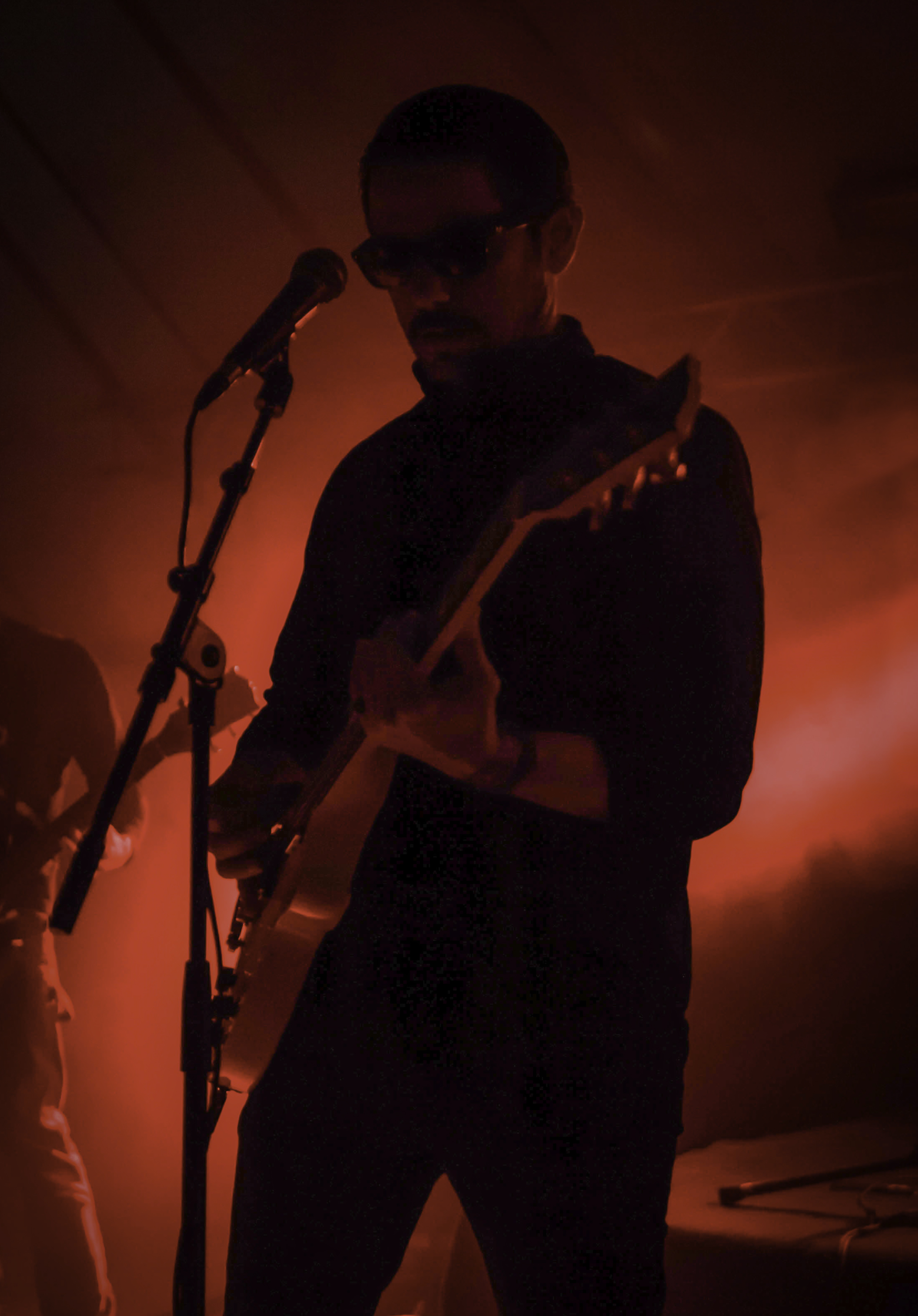
Damien Done performing at Ieperfest in Ypres, Belgium on August 10, 2018. From left to right: Andrew Dempz and Damien Moyal.

Influences during the writing of album included Glenn Danzig, Serge Gainsbourg, Iggy Pop, Billy Idol, Peter Steele, Nick Cave, Randy Newman, Pixies, Joy Division, Black Sabbath, Pulp and Black Moon.

The album's working title was Protection, and Moyal offered a collection of early demos, Demos for Protection, for free download during a limited time on the band's Bandcamp page in January 2017. One of the songs from the session, a cover of Killing Joke's "Primitive", was recorded in January 2016 and appeared on another Bandcamp-exclusive release, Blown Covers, on January 30, 2016. "Primitive" was partly re-recorded and re-mixed during the album's recording session.

"When You Left Home" is the oldest composition on the album, originating from the unreleased Bits of Happy extended play, written and recorded between 2004 and 2006. The song's demo (initially given the longer title "When You Left Your Home", but also known as "Palomita Asustada") was first included on an expanded version of Stay Black, made available for free download on Moyal's personal website in late 2010, and later on Damien Done's Bandcamp page on August 20, 2011. Moyal fully re-recorded the song in 2016 for Charm Offensive. The song's lyrics deal with someone going out into the real world, only to be consumed by self-doubt and feelings of inadequacy.

The album opener "The Freeze" was another early composition, recorded in November 2016, and first included on a limited edition USB split release with Nathaniel Shannon & The Vanishing Twin, to coincide with Damien Done's first concert at Detroit, Michigan's UFO Factory on December 21, 2016 The song was further developed and re-mixed before appearing on Charm Offensive. Moyal described the song as one of three pieces from the album that are piano-driven. He noted the story within the lyrics as an invitation to enter into a relationship with someone who is toxic; the context of which also serves as a false expectation for what is to come on the album, by offering a song different from the others.

"Things Are Going Great (Just You Wait)" was another song described by Moyal as piano-driven, and its lyrics warn that one should always live in constant fear of losing everything and a reminder that happiness and stability are delicate. "The Good Book" takes the narrative of an elder, narrow-minded, dying man in the rural south, who alienated his only son over religious beliefs. "Who's Gonna Believe You?" tells the story of a stranger passing through a small town, witnessing a crime, and later discovering that it is being covered up by the local officials.

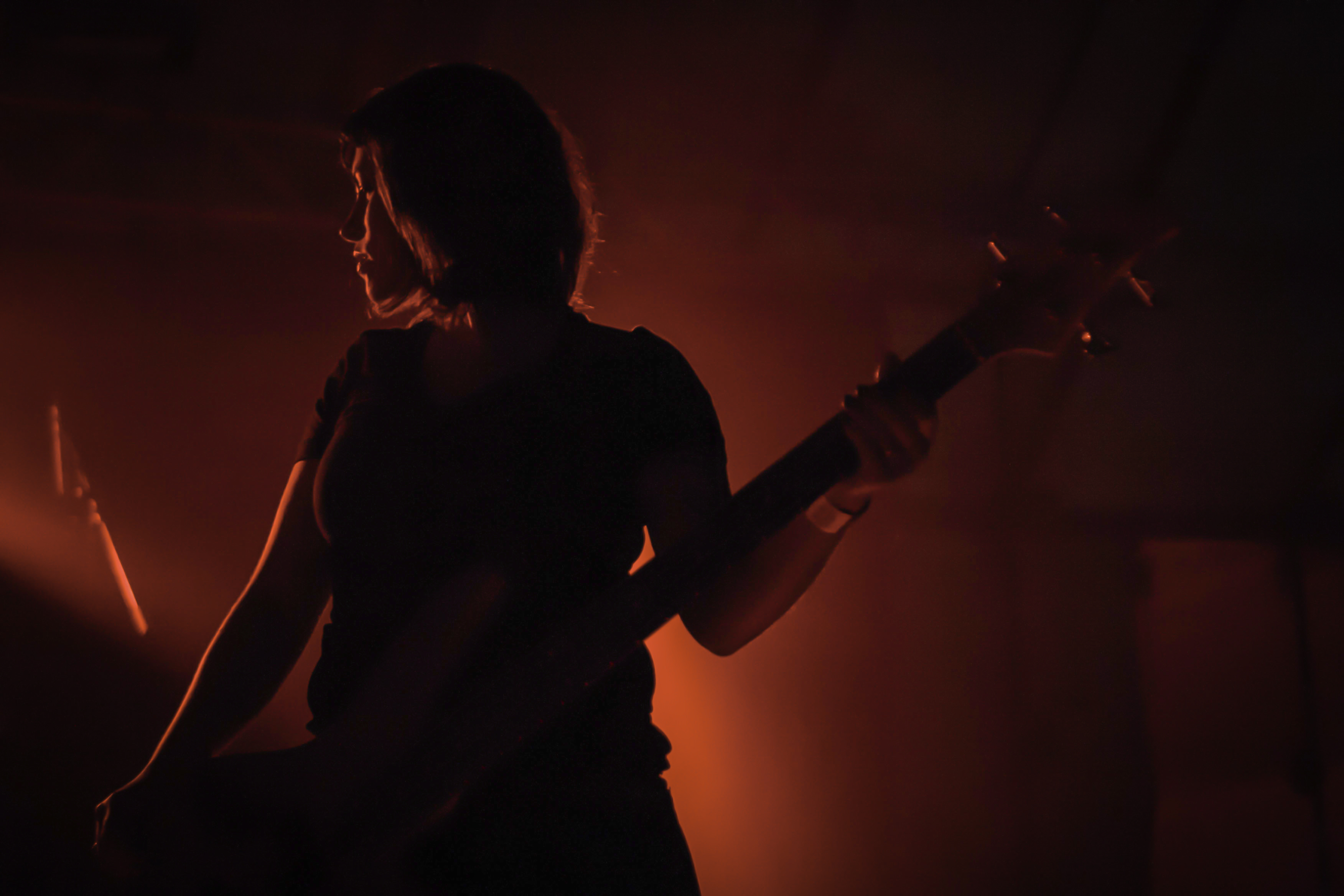
Damien Done performing at Ieperfest in Ypres, Belgium on August 10, 2018. Pictured: Laura Jane Leonard.

"Angels Overlooking Him" was singled out by Moyal as a departure for Damien Done, experimenting with elements of doo-wop and Americana. The narrative recounts a poor boy falling in love with a rich girl from the other side of the tracks, of her father sending out goons to dissuade the boy, and of the boy ultimately finding out that the attraction was only one-sided.

The album closer, "Something on You", was described by Moyal as more subdued, minimal and experimental; the last of the three songs on the album to heavily feature piano, and a deliberate connection with the album opener, "The Freeze". The character in the lyrics is a blackmailer who is threatening to ruin another man's life, not for financial gain but for the pleasure of controlling the other individual. Moyal programmed a minimalist ticking beat to the song to give the impression that time was running out for the victim, yet deliberately left the story unresolved.

"Roof Access" was among the final batch of songs written for Charm Offensive in 2017. Moyal ranked it as one of his favorites from the release, breaking it down as energetic-yet-restrained, sleazy, cold and dark; all elements he wished to explore further with Damien Done. It is one of several songs on the album to delve into voyeurism, invasion and compulsion. The lyrics' plot involves a woman who becomes obsessed with man living in her apartment building, and who finds a way to sneak into his bedroom each night to watch him sleep and go through his personal belongings.

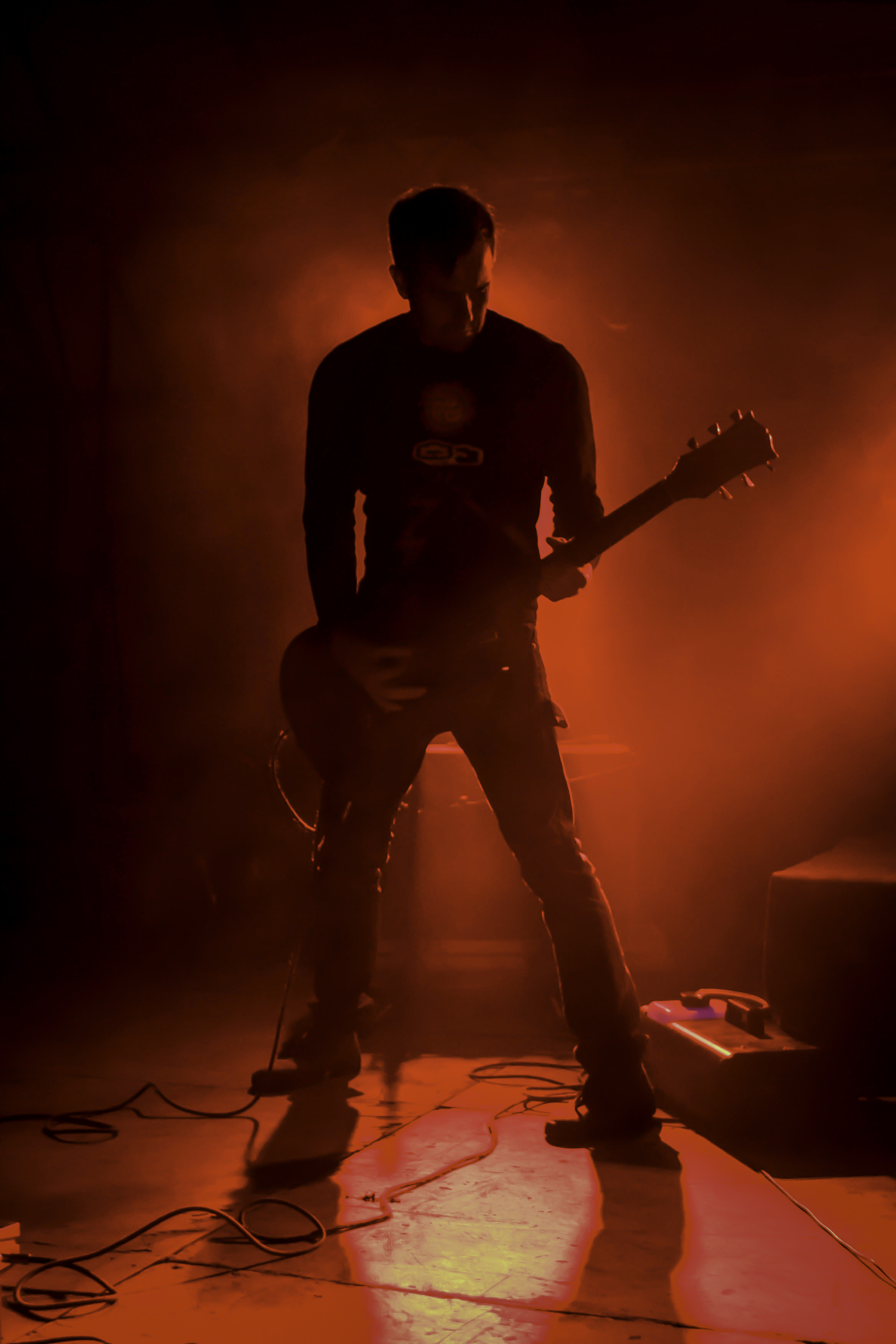
Damien Done performing at Ieperfest in Ypres, Belgium on August 10, 2018. Pictured: Andrew Dempz.

"Curious Thing" was the second-to-last song composed for the album, and explores further elements of compulsion and secrecy. The lyrics tell of a man who has partaken in an unspecified, but terrible crime and fears that his beloved wife is sure to find out. His suspecting wife begins to follow him and, at the risk of losing her, he invites her to discover what he has been up to.

"The Lord Fox" was the final song written for Charm Offensive. The tune came about when Moyal was nearly done mixing the release and realized that he disliked the last song left to mix, "The Taker". Not wanting to cut his album short, he quickly wrote "The Lord Fox" as a replacement, instantly recognizing that he was onto something special. In contrast to the story-line in "Curious Thing", "The Lord Fox" involves a womanizer who has completely dejected his wife. The narrative is, however, told from the wife's point of view, who sees no alternative but to poison her estranged husband in order to salvage her sanity.

Moyal performed and engineered nearly all of the material on Charm Offensive at his home studio in Ann Arbor, Michigan. This included lead and backing vocals, acoustic and electric guitars, synthesizers, piano, percussion, as well as the programming of digital drums and bass guitar. Moyal eventually re-recorded his vocal tracks for the song "Curious Thing" with producer Mike Hasty at Cloud City Studio in Garden City, Michigan (where Damien Done had previously recorded the single He Really Tried / And Now the Rain in February 2016). Moyal then sent the completed material for mixing to James Paul Wisner at Wisner Productions in St. Cloud, Florida, who wound up re-recording the programmed bass guitar parts with a real instrument, and also added new guitar textures. Moyal and Wisner co-produced the album together.

== Release and promotion ==
=== Singles ===
With Charm Offensive completed in 2017, the band was signed to California-based record label Mind Over Matter Records. In August 2017, the record company announced that it would release a limited edition 7-inch single for the song "Curious Thing" on September 8, 2017, as a precursor to the album. A music video for "Curious Thing" was produced by Ann Arbor, Michigan-based film production company Three Goats Moving Pictures, which premiered on August 25, 2017, at the same time as pre-orders opened for the 7-inch vinyl single. The 7-inch record was limited and hand-numbered to 200 copies, available on a choice of black, clear or clear with black smoke colors. The 7-inch single's b-side included the Killing Joke cover "Primitive", which also had a music video (produced by Moyal), and which premiered on September 15, 2017.

Charm Offensive's next single was "The Lord Fox", which was accompanied by an animated music video produced by Matthew Craft at Mammoth Colony. The music video premiered on January 13, 2018. On February 2, 2018, Mind Over Matter Records released the digital-only single "Who's Gonna Believe You?", though the band did not consider it an official single since no music video was produced. Three Goats Moving Pictures was again commissioned to produce a music video for "Roof Access", intended as a tie-in with the previously released "Curious Thing". Similar visual elements and characters were utilized in both music videos. The video for "Roof Access" premiered on February 16, 2018, which was originally planned as Charm Offensive's release date, but that album was eventually delayed.

=== Album delays and packaging ===
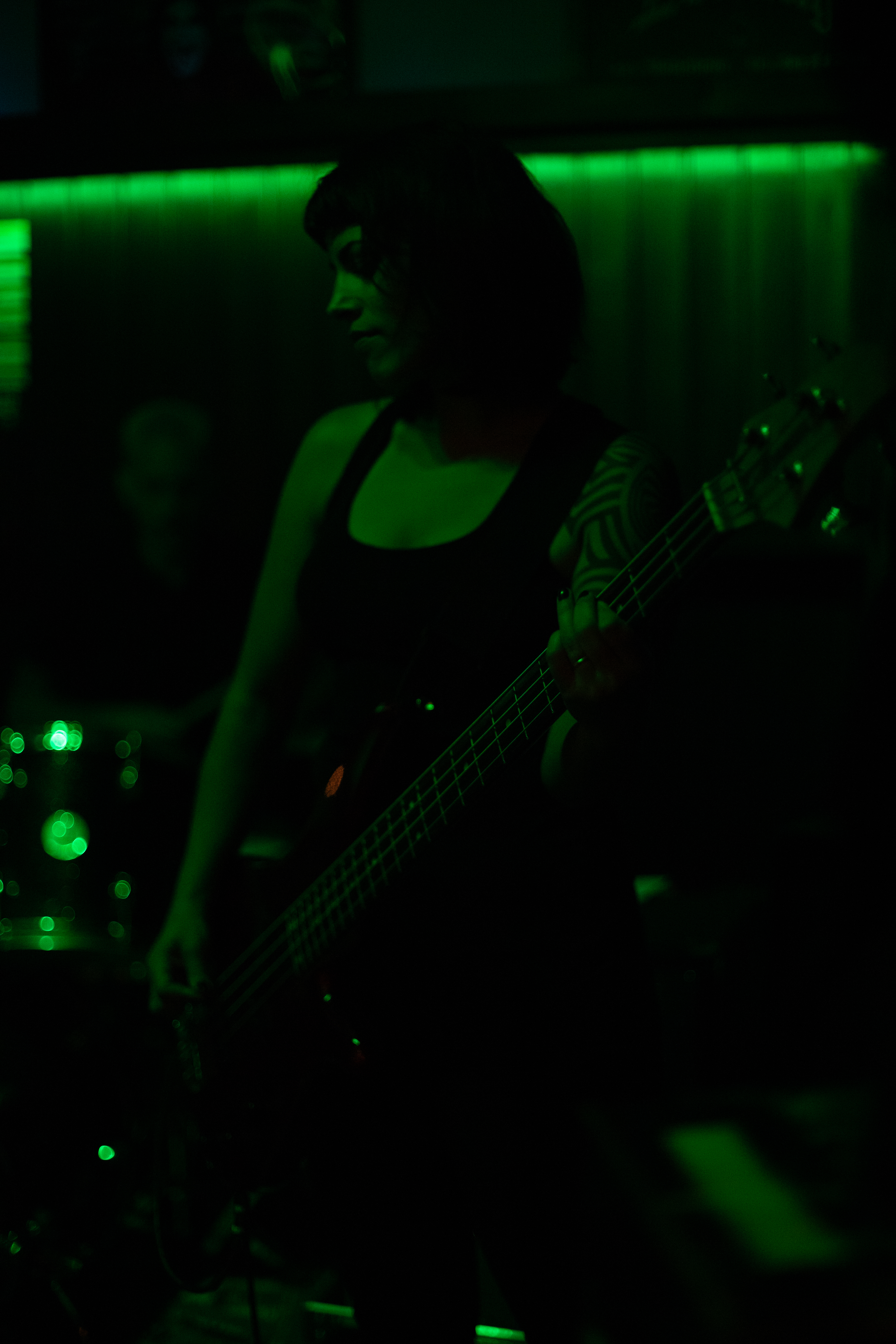
Damien Done performing at Whiskey's Unrockbar in Osnabrück, Germany on August 11, 2018. From left to right: Benjamin Moore and Laura Jane Leonard.

Charm Offensive was originally scheduled for release on February 16, 2018, by Mind Over Matter Records and with distribution in the United States through Deathwish Direct. However, delays at the vinyl pressing plant pushed back the physical edition of the album by more than two months. The test pressing was received on January 25, 2018, but the final order was not delivered back to the record label until April 26, 2018. The album was released digitally first, on March 2, 2018.

Mind Over Matter Records offered Charm Offensive in a wide variety of vinyl colors and packaging options. The album cover's photograph was taken by Nathaniel Shannon, and depicts a man wearing a ski mask, holding a bouquet of flowers, and sitting in a subway train between two women. Moyal explained the meaning behind the image as:

In a lot of my songs, the protagonist (or antagonist... the line is often blurred) is living a double life, and often has innocent motives or intentions that are corrupted by something darker. In the case of the Charm Offensive cover, that idea of depravity and innocence working in unison takes the form of a love-struck stalker.

The rest of the album's design and layout was handled by Moyal, who is noted for executing his bands' album covers, while the extensive packaging options were developed between Moyal and Mind Over Matter Records' owner, Austin Kihn. The standard 12-inch vinyl was offered in a choice of two colors: purple with black splatter, or pink, white and dark blue mixed swirl. The test pressing was offered on black vinyl but with a different cover art, designed by Moyal, showing a hand creeping open blinds. A boxed edition, titled the Deluxe Creep Kit, offered the vinyl on a special clear with pink splatter color, and came packaged in a customized pizza box, with a blue tarp, a pair of black wool gloves, a black wool ski mask, a nylon chord and a Mind Over Matter Records sticker. Finally, Mind Over Matter Records also had customized Damien Done mailer boxes to ship the release, for all orders placed directly through the record label.

On May 25, 2018, Belgian record label Hypertension Records announced that it would release Charm Offensive on 12-inch vinyl for the European market. The Belgian edition was offered on purple-colored vinyl and included a download card with "Primitive" as a bonus track. The European version was released on August 10, 2018, to coincide with Damien Done's European tour, and was distributed by British company Shellshock. Hypertension Records also released a special tour-only edition of the album, which housed the 12-inch vinyl sleeve in a black satin bag, silkscreened by Lionel Arlen at Le 7e Oeil.

=== Touring ===
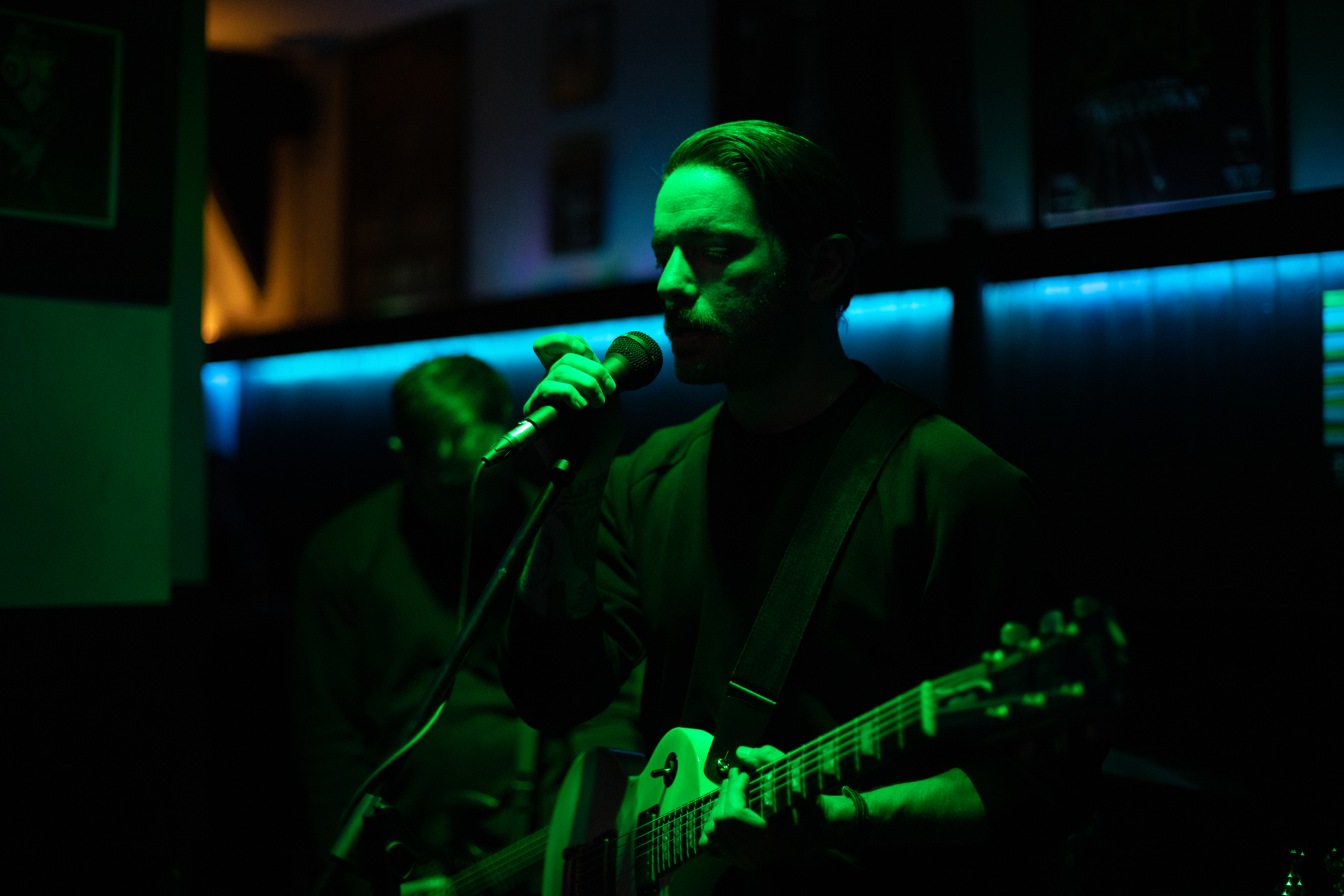
Damien Done performing at Whiskey's Unrockbar in Osnabrück, Germany on August 11, 2018. From left to right: Andrew Dempz and Damien Moyal.

Before Charm Offensive was completed, Moyal began recruiting band members to support him and enable Damien Done to play shows. Unfamiliar with the Michigan music scene (having grown up in Florida), Moyal initially had difficulty finding members. While in his past bands, Moyal usually worked as a co-songwriter with other members, he suddenly needed to find musicians who were willing to contribute strictly as a backing band, without creative input. In December 2016, Moyal finally found the members he was looking for, and Damien Done was completed with former Child Bite drummer Benjamin Moore, former Earthmover guitarist Andrew Dempz, and bass guitarist Laura Jane Leonard. Damien Done played its first show with its new line-up on December 21, 2016, at Detroit's UFO Factory.

Damien Done planned to play a record release show for Charm Offensive in early 2018, but it was ultimately cancelled when the vinyl kept being delayed. The band kicked off its nine-date European and British tour, which spanned August 10–18, 2018, with a performance at Ieperfest in Ypres, Belgium, followed by shows in Germany, Czech Republic, Hungary, Austria and England.

The band spent the remainder of 2018 playing shows around Michigan, in Ann Arbor (at The Blind Pig), Detroit, Ypsilanti and Hamtramck, opening for such artists as Helen Money and Street Sects and performing at the No Rest Festival, held at Trumbullplex. Further shows in promotion of the album were played in Michigan throughout 2019 and early 2020, in addition to Iron Festival in Newport, Kentucky, but things came to a halt with the outbreak of the COVID-19 pandemic.

== Critical reception and recognition ==
Professional ratings
Review scores
Source	Rating
Casbah Records	Positive
CVLT Nation	Positive
Idioteq	Positive
Kerrang!	Positive
New Noise Magazine	Positive
No Echo	Positive
RMP Magazine	Positive
Slam Alternative Music Magazine	Positive

Charm Offensive and Damien Done received overall positive critical acclaim upon the album's release. In April 2018, Slam Alternative Music Magazine named it Album of the Month. Critics had difficulty categorizing the band's music into a single genre, but generally agreed with calling it dark post-punk, dark new wave, dark pop, and gothic rock. Others called it dark wave rock, doom-tinged rock 'n' roll, doom rock, gloom pop, gloom rock, dark folk rock, art rock, moody rock, decadent pop, and even cold wave.

Damien Done was compared to such acts as Billy Idol, Nick Cave, King Dude, Danzig, Iggy Pop, Tears for Fears, Echo & the Bennymen, Type O Negative, Interpol, and Grave Pleasures. The music was commonly described by the press as dark, with such accompanying adjectives as gloomy, brooding, bleak, sinister, moody, and seedy. It was also defined as bluesy, alluring, melodic, and addictive.

The production and general sound of the released was praised as lush. The songs and album were described as "voyeuristic tales", "moody fever dreams", "spooky love songs", "a thrilling ride into the unknown", "a lurching adventure", "a sensory immersive journey", and "a cohesive, well-charming collection", with "voyeuristic noir sensibility", and "a pulpy array of noir". Moyal's vocals were praised as "velvety crooning" and "haunting baritone".

== Track listing ==
All music and lyrics written by Moyal, except "Primitive". Credits are adapted from the album's liner notes.

No.	Title	Length
1.	"The Freeze"	3:35
2.	"Roof Access"	4:32
3.	"When You Left Home"	3:34
4.	"The Lord Fox"	4:25
5.	"Curious Thing"	3:33
6.	"Things Are Going Great (Just You Wait)"	4:21
7.	"Angels Overlooking Him"	3:59
8.	"Who's Gonna Believe You?"	4:46
9.	"The Good Book"	3:34
10.	"Something on You"	4:56
Total length:		41:15

European bonus track
No.	Title	Music	Length
11.	"Primitive"	Coleman; Ferguson; Glover; Walker	3:41
Total length:			44:56

== Personnel ==
Credits are adapted from the album's liner notes.

Damien Done

- Damien Moyal – vocals, acoustic guitar, electric guitar, synthesizers, piano, percussion, drum programming

Guest musicians

- James Paul Wisner – bass guitar, additional guitar

Production

- James Paul Wisner – recording engineer, mixer and producer at Wisner Productions
- Mike Hasty – "Curious Thing" vocals recording engineer at Cloud City Studio
- Damien Moyal – recording engineer, producer, artwork and packaging designer
- Nathaniel Shannon – photography
- Austin Kihn – design concept and packaging
- Lionel Arlen – screenprinting at Le 7e Oeil (Satin tour edition)

== Release history ==
Release formats for Charm Offensive
Region	Date	Label	Format	Catalog
United States	January 25, 2018	Mind Over Matter Records	LP (Test pressing edition)	MOM041
United States	March 2, 2018	Mind Over Matter Records	Digital	MOM041
United States	April 26, 2018	Mind Over Matter Records	LP (Standard edition)	MOM041
United States	May 9, 2018	Mind Over Matter Records	LP (Deluxe Creep Kit edition)	MOM041
Belgium	August 10, 2018	Hypertension Records	LP (Standard edition)	HYPE032
Belgium	August 10, 2018	Hypertension Records	LP (Satin tour edition)	HYPE032
