= Empire of the Senseless =

Studio album by Senseless Things
- Released: 1993
- Genre: Indie rock
- Label: Epic
- Producer: Senseless Things, Ralph Jezzard

Senseless Things chronology
The First of Too Many (1991)	Empire of the Senseless (1993)	Taking Care of Business (1995)

Professional ratings
Review scores
Source	Rating
The Encyclopedia of Popular Music	3/5 stars
Select	3/5 stars

Empire of the Senseless is an album by the English rock band Senseless Things. It was released in 1993, and was produced by Senseless Things and Ralph Jezzard. It was not released in the United States.

The album peaked at #37 on the Official Albums Chart. "Homophobic Asshole" was the album's first single.

== Track listing ==
All tracks composed by Mark Keds; except where indicated

1. "Homophobic Asshole" (Ben Harding)
2. "Keepsake"
3. "Tempting Kate"
4. "Hold It Down" (Morgan Nicholls)
5. "Counting Friends"
6. "Just One Reason"
7. "Cruel Moon"
8. "Primary Instinct"
9. "Rise" (Song for Dean and Gene)
10. "Ice Skating at The Milky Way"
11. "Say What You Will"
12. "Runaways"
