= Ether (band) =

- Origin: Blackwood, Caerphilly, Wales
- Genres: Britpop, alternative rock
- Years active: 1996–1999
- Labels: Regal, Parlophone
- Past members: Rory Meredith; Gareth Driscoll; Brett Sawmy

Ether were an alternative rock band from Blackwood, Caerphilly, Wales formed in 1996. They had a minor UK hit single in 1998 with "Watching You".

== History ==
The successful incarnation of the band was formed in 1996 by Rory Meredith (vocals, guitar), Gareth Driscoll (vocals, bass), and Brett Sawmy (drums), although Meredith had used the name for an earlier band that he formed as a teenager. After a single on the Regal label in 1996 they moved to Parlophone Records, releasing four further singles and the 1998 album Strange. They recorded a second album in 1999, but it was not released due to the band splitting up.

They drew comparisons to groups such as Squeeze and The Beatles.

Meredith later formed the band Sugar Rush with singer-songwriter Katherine Davies, releasing an album Beautiful But Tragic in 2006 on LA based indie label Beverly Martel Music.

== Discography ==
Albums

- Strange (1998), Parlophone

Singles

- "He Say Yeah" (1996), Regal
- "If You Really Want to Know" (1997), Parlophone - UK No.77
- "She Could Fly" (1997), Parlophone - UK No.80
- "Watching You" (1998), Parlophone - UK No.74
- "Best Friend" (1998), Parlophone - UK No.84
