= Organized (album) =

Studio album by Morgan
- Released: 2000
- Genre: Electronic, synthpop, trip hop
- Label: Mawlaw 388 Ltd.
- Producer: Morgan Nicholls

Organized is the only solo album by Morgan Nicholls, released in 2000 under the mononym Morgan. "Miss Parker", "Soul Searching", "Flying High" and "Sitting in the Sun" were also released as singles. Pete Townshend plays bass guitar on "Heaven Come Quickly".

== Track listing ==
1. "Flying High" – 3:33
2. "Something He Said" – 4:19
3. "Sitting in the Sun" – 3:59
4. "When I Close My Eyes" – 6:02
5. "Paparazzi" – 2:51
6. "Soul Searching Part 1" – 3:26
7. "Soul Searching Part 2" – 4:36
8. "Here Comes the Rain" – 5:47
9. "Organized" – 3:33
10. "Miss Parker" (Morgan Original Long Version) – 5:03
11. "At the Flamingo Hotel" – 5:06
12. "Fistful of Love" – 2:42
13. "Heaven Come Quickly" – 4:54
