= Damien Done =

American post-punk band

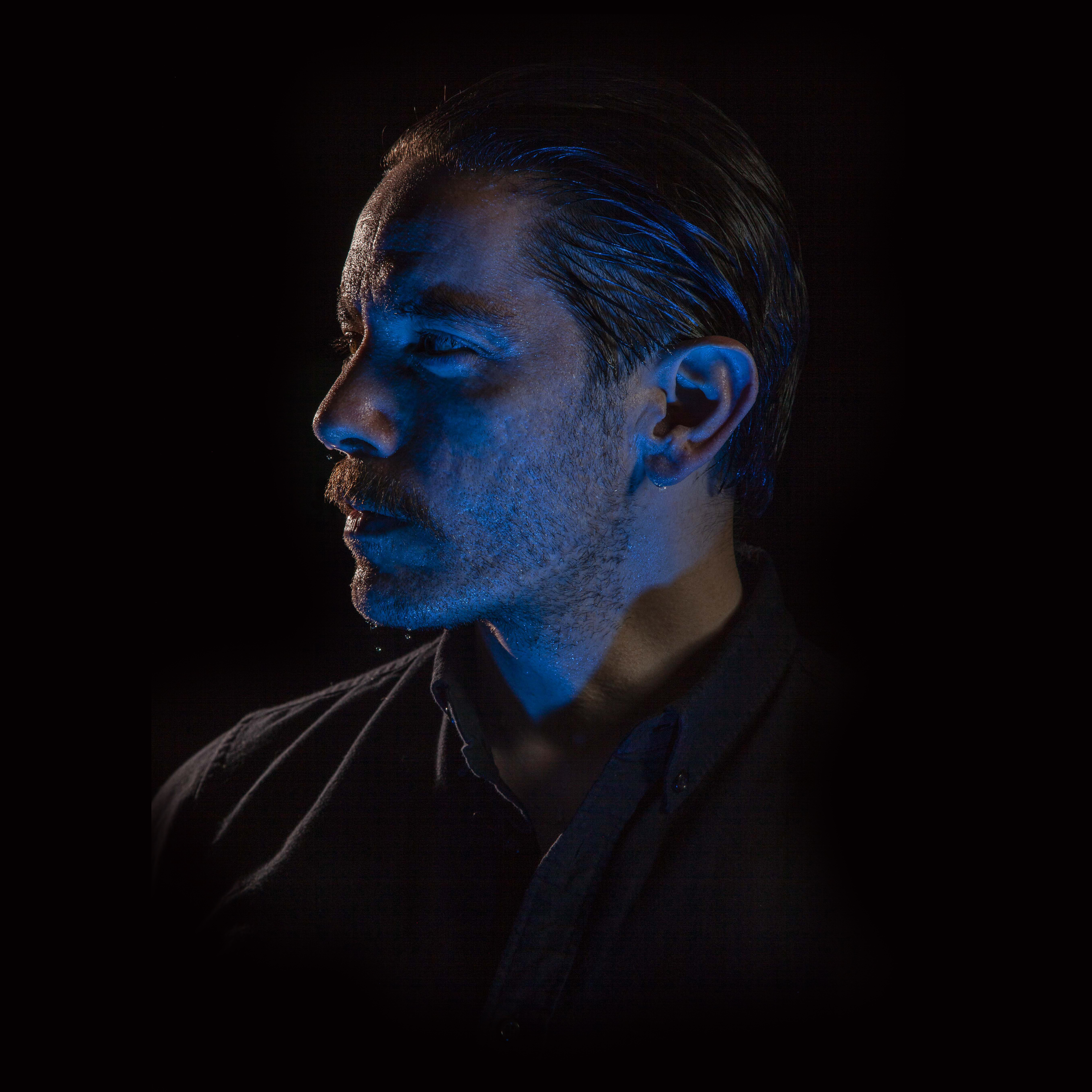
- Founding band member and principal songwriter Damien Moyal in a promotional Damien Done picture on December 26, 2018.

Background information
- Also known as: Rubbers, Done
- Origin: Gainesville, Florida
- Genres: Post-punk; gothic rock
- Works: Damien Done discography
- Years active: 2002–present
- Labels: Contraband Goods; Demons Run Amok; Escapist; Good Life; Hypertension; Mind Over Matter; Protagonist; Speedowax
- Members: Damien Moyal; Laura Jane Leonard; Tyler Kane
- Past members: (see Members section)

Damien Done is an American post-punk/gothic rock band from Ann Arbor, Michigan. Formed in Gainesville, Florida in 2002 as a semi-eponymously-named solo project by frontman Damien Moyal, the group has since been expanded to include other band members and co-songwriters. The current lineup features Moyal (vocals, guitar, synthesizer, drum programming), Laura Jane Leonard (bass guitar) and Tyler Kane (guitar, bass guitar).

Damien Done originally formed under the name Rubbers and recorded its debut EP, Love Thongs, in 2003. Scheduled for release through Belgian record label Good Life Recordings, the EP was ultimately shelved for thirteen years until it was picked up by German record label Demons Run Amok Entertainment, and released under the title Stay Black in 2016.

After a series of singles, the band followed-up with its first full-length album, Charm Offensive, released by American record label Mind Over Matter Records in 2018. Damien Done underwent several line-up changes and in 2020 released two EPs: Baby, Don't Hearse Me and To Night, both also on Mind Over Matter Records. The band's second full-length album, Total Power, was released through Mind Over Matter Records and Protagonist Music in 2023.

== Background ==
=== Love Thongs and Stay Black (2002–2016) ===
Damien Moyal had previously fronted such hardcore punk, metallic hardcore and melodic hardcore bands as Shai Hulud, Morning Again, As Friends Rust, Culture and Bird of Ill Omen during the 1990s and early 2000s. After leaving Gainesville, Florida-based As Friends Rust in February 2002, Moyal began working on solo material under the moniker Rubbers. "Dude Becomes Sea" was the first song Moyal wrote for the new project.

Handling vocals and acoustic guitar, Moyal recruited drummer and keyboardist Matthew Crum, formerly of As Friends Rust and The Rocking Horse Winner; electric guitarist Juan Montoya, formerly of Floor and Cavity, and later of Torche; and electric guitarist and bass guitarist James Paul Wisner to record the six-song debut EP Love Thongs in September 2003. Wisner also engineered and produced the session. A handful of band-made copies of Love Thongs were circulated by Moyal in late 2003.

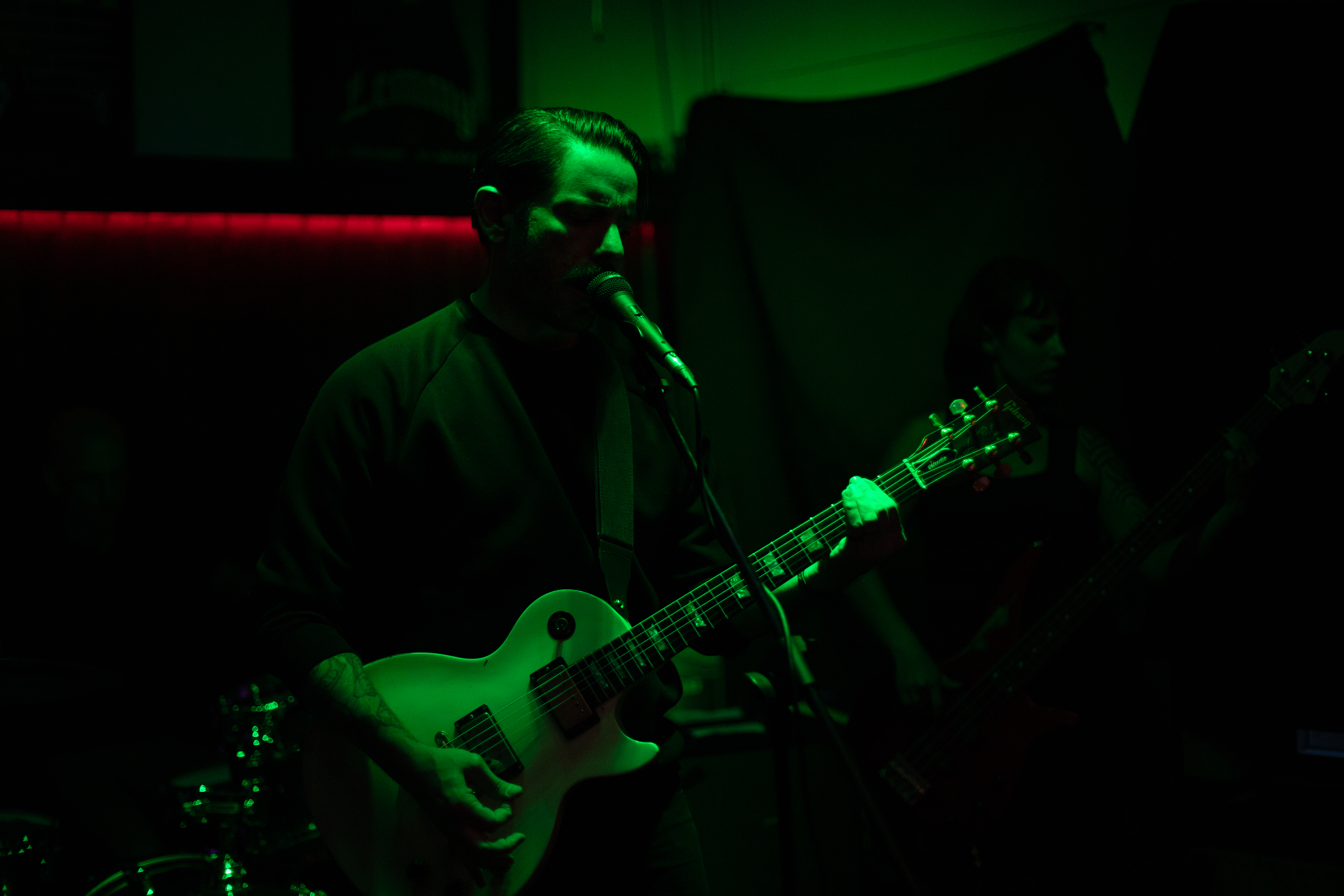
Damien Done performing at Whiskey's Unrockbar in Osnabrück, Germany on August 11, 2018. From left to right: Benjamin Moore, Damien Moyal (foreground) and Laura Jane Leonard.

Rubbers was renamed Damien Done, and the band was immediately signed to Belgian record label Good Life Recordings, which had previously released material by As Friends Rust, Morning Again, Culture and Shai Hulud. Good Life Recordings owner, Edward Verhaeghe, invited Moyal to Belgium in November 2003, to film a music video for the lead single "The New Cleavage" (then titled "Ass-Crack Is the New Cleavage"), directed by Integrity vocalist Dwid Hellion. Love Thongs was scheduled for release through Good Life Recordings as a CD and DVD combo package in April 2004, but the release remained stuck in limbo for over a decade. Some of the songs from the session appeared on Good Life Recordings' Various Artists compilation Good Life Recordings Presents: Never Surrender - The Best New Underground Music 2004-2005 (2004), the Vice magazine travel documentary and its soundtrack The Vice Guide to Travel (2006) and the Belgian soft porn films J'fais du porno et j'aime ça and Skin. Like. Sun. (both 2009).

While awaiting the release of Love Thongs, Moyal recruited several new musicians, including former I Hate Myself drummer Jon Marburger; former Shai Hulud, Cavity, 108, Against All Authority and Where Fear and Weapons Meet drummer (and then-member of Hazen Street and Until the End) Jason Lederman; former Where Fear and Weapons Meet, Dashboard Confessional and Seville bass guitarist Daniel Bonebrake; and former Glasseater guitarist (and future Poison the Well touring guitarist) Ariel Arro. With Arro, Damien Done recorded a cover of Integrity's song "Eighteen", which was released on Escapist Records' Various Artists compilation Harder They Fall: Tribute to Integrity in February 2007. In 2006, Moyal relocated to Ann Arbor, Michigan.

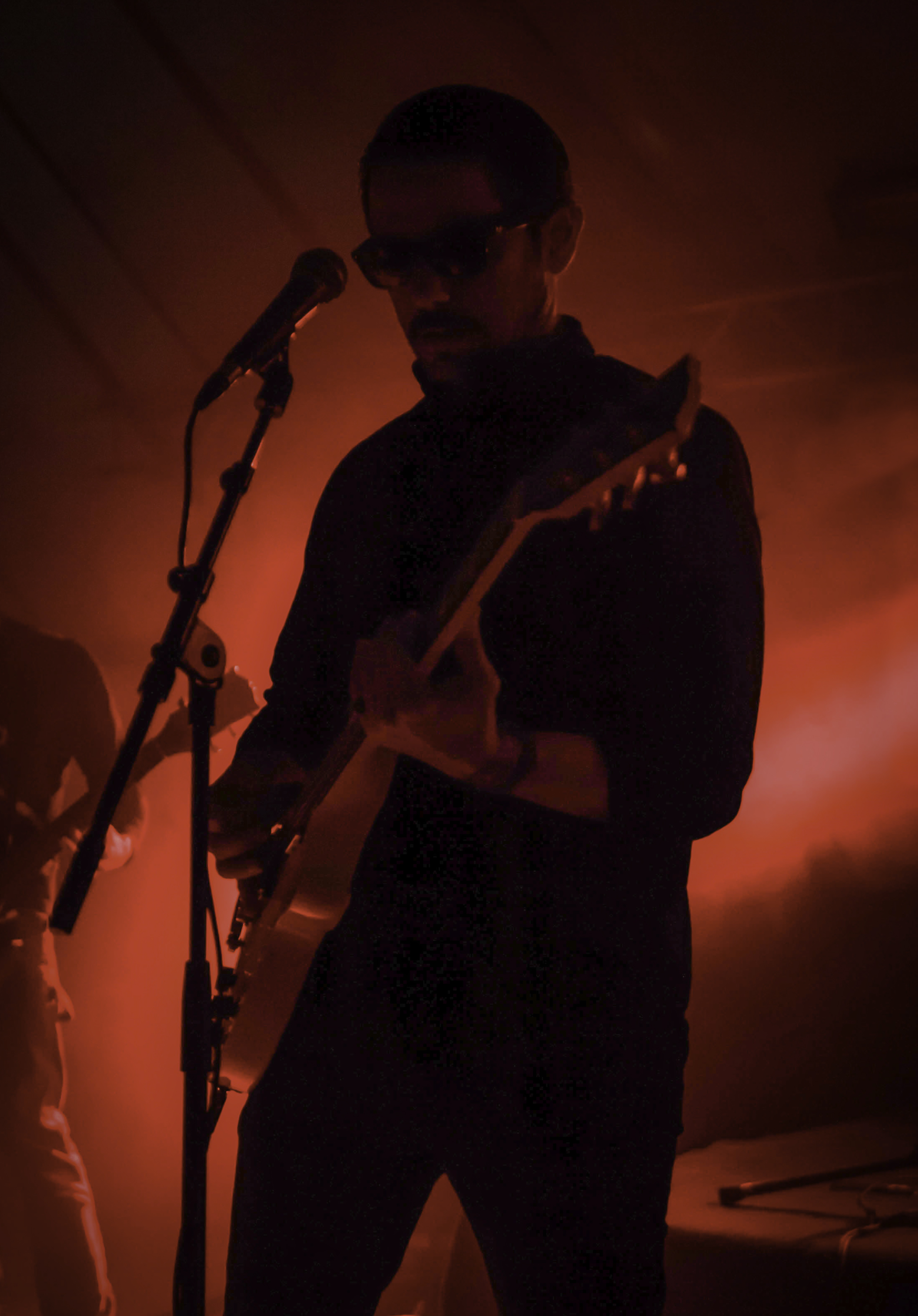
Damien Done performing at Ieperfest in Ypres, Belgium on August 10, 2018. From left to right: Andrew Dempz and Damien Moyal.

Love Thongs was eventually renamed Stay Black, and the EP was put up for free download through the band's Bandcamp page in 2011. Stay Black was finally released on 12-inch vinyl by German record label Demons Run Amok Entertainment in July 2016. Like Good Life Recordings, Demons Run Amok Entertainment had released material by Moyal's other bands, including Culture, As Friends Rust, Morning Again and On Bodies. Demons Run Amok Entertainment simultaneously released a 7-inch vinyl of two newly recorded Damien Done songs: "He Really Tried" and "And Now the Rain" The new songs featured drummer Timothy Kirkpatrick, formerly of Moments in Grace and then playing in As Friends Rust; bass guitarist Michael Hasty, formerly of Walls of Jericho; and electric guitarist Juan Montoya. Hasty also engineered and produced the session.

=== Charm Offensive and Total Power (2016–2023) ===
In December 2016, Moyal rebuilt the band with former Child Bite drummer Benjamin Moore, former Earthmover guitarist Andrew Dempz, and bass guitarist Laura Jane Leonard; Damien Done played its first show with the new line-up on December 21, 2016, at Detroit's UFO Factory. In 2017, the band was signed to California-based record label Mind Over Matter Records, releasing in September of that same year a 7-inch vinyl single of two new songs: "Curious Thing" and a cover of Killing Joke's "Primitive".

Damien Done followed-up with Charm Offensive, the band's first full-length album, released on 12-inch vinyl by Mind Over Matter Records in March 2018. In addition to the previously released single "Curious Thing", the album also included the singles "Roof Access" and "The Lord Fox". The album was released on 12-inch vinyl in Europe by Belgian record label Hypertension Records, and promoted through a nine-date European tour in August 2018. The band kicked-off their European tour by playing at Ieperfest in Ypres, Belgium, followed by shows in Germany, Czech Republic, Hungary, Austria and England.

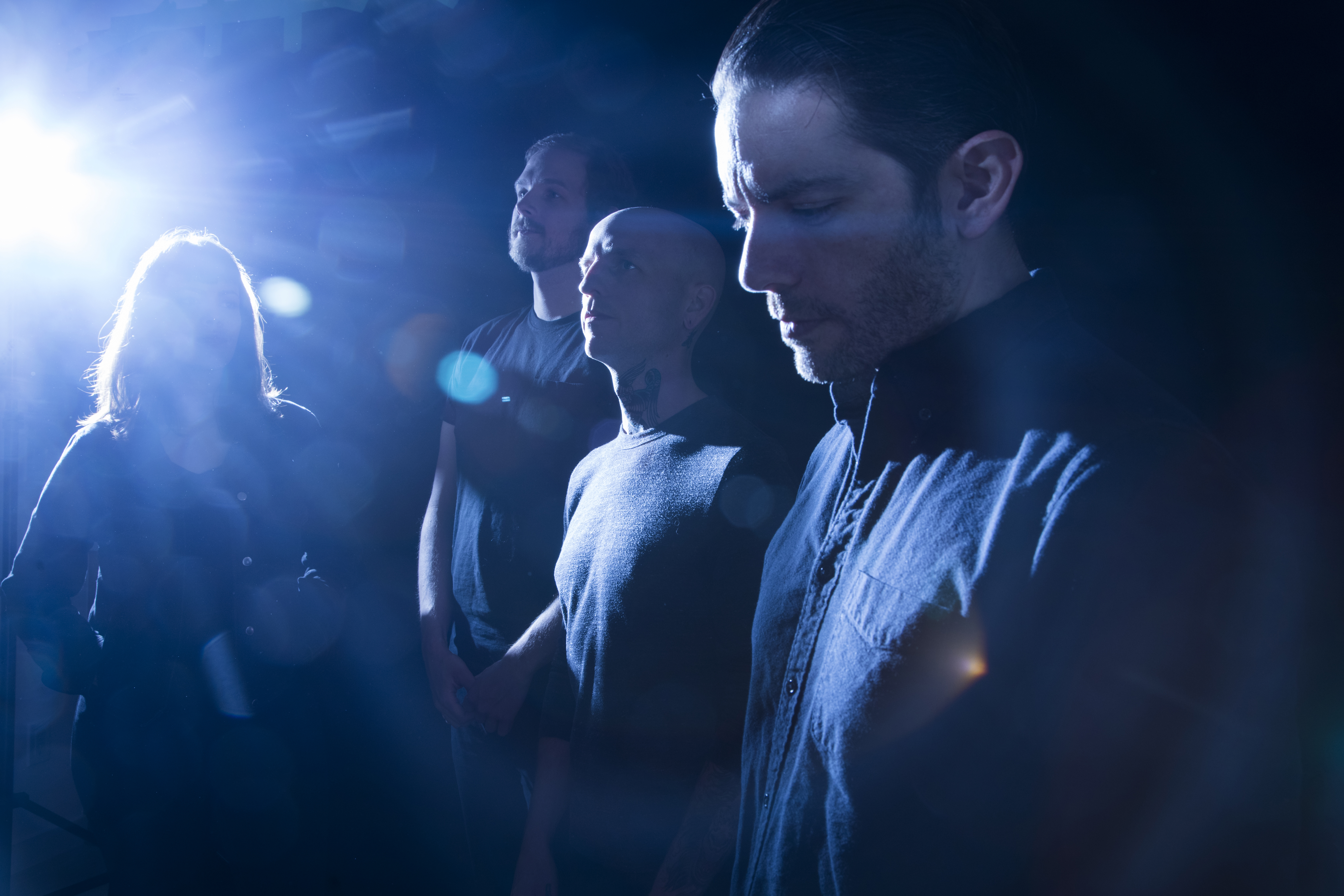
Damien Done posing for a full band promotional picture on June 13, 2019. From left to right: Laura Jane Leonard, Tyler Kane, Benjamin Moore and Damien Moyal.

The band spent the last few months of 2018 playing shows around Michigan in Ann Arbor, Detroit, Ypsilanti and Hamtramck, opening for Helen Money and Street Sects and performing at the No Rest Festival. In March 2019, Damien Done released a split 7-inch vinyl with British post-punk band DeadCuts through Speedowax Records. In 2019, guitarist Andrew Dempz was replaced by Tyler Kane.

On Valentine's Day 2020, Damien Done released the digital EP Baby, Don't Hearse Me; an 11-inch screen-printed vinyl version was released by Mind Over Matter Records a month later. The band quickly followed up with the To Night EP, released digitally in May 2020; a tape edition was released by Contraband Goods in October 2020, while Mind Over Matter Records and Speedowax Records co-released a double 7-inch vinyl version a year later in October 2021.

In November 2020, Damien Done released the three-song EP Demos from the Year 2020, which includes working versions of the band's sophomore full-length album, Total Power. In February 2021, Damien Done released the non-album single "Nightclubbing", a cover of the 1977 Iggy Pop and David Bowie song.

On January 31, 2023, "Pray for Me", the first single from the band's second full-length album, Total Power, was released. The second single from Total Power, "Inexorcisable", was released on March 24, 2023, while the third single, "Bounty and Blight" (which features guest vocalist La Femme Pendu) was released on April 21, 2023. A fourth song from Total Power, "Young Drugs", was released in advance of the album's release once pre-orders were accepted on May 5, 2023. The album was scheduled for release through Mind Over Matter Records and Protagonist Music on May 19, 2023, but was delayed by several weeks due to pressing plant issues.

== Members ==
Current lineup

- Damien Moyal – vocals, acoustic guitar, electric guitar, synthesizers, drum programming (2002–present)
- Laura Jane Leonard – bass guitar (2016–present)
- Tyler Kane – electric guitar, bass guitar (2019–present)

Former members

- Matthew Crum – drums, percussion, synthesizers (2003)
- Jon Marburger – drums (2004)
- Jason Lederman – drums (2004–2005)
- Daniel Bonebrake – bass guitar (2004–2005)
- Andrew Dempz – electric guitar (2016–2019)
- Benjamin Moore – drums (2016–2021)

== Discography ==
Studio albums

- Charm Offensive (2018)
- Total Power (2023)

EPs

- Love Thongs (2003)
- Stay Black (2016)
- Baby, Don't Hearse Me (2020)
- To Night (2020)
