= Stay Black =

- Stay Black EP 2016 cover art.

EP by Damien Done
- Released: July 8, 2016
- Recorded: September 2003
- Studio: Wisner Productions, Davie, Florida
- Genre: Post-punk; rock and roll
- Length: 25:40
- Label: Demons Run Amok
- Producer: James Paul Wisner; Damien Moyal

Damien Done chronology
Stay Black (2016)	Charm Offensive (2018)

Singles from Stay Black
- 1. "The New Cleavage" Released: February 6, 2004

Love Thongs EP 2004 cover art
- Love Thongs EP 2004 cover art.

Stay Black LP 2010 cover art
- Stay Black LP 2010 cover art.

Stay Black EP 2011 cover art
- Stay Black EP 2011 cover art.

Stay Black EP 2013 cover art
- Stay Black EP 2013 cover art.

Stay Black is the debut extended play by American gothic rock and roll / post-punk band Damien Done. Originally titled Love Thongs, it was recorded in September 2003 and scheduled for release in April 2004, through Belgian record label Good Life Recordings. The record company refused to release the extended play and kept it stuck in limbo for thirteen years, until German record label Demons Run Amok Entertainment licensed its rights in late 2015. While awaiting its official release, the band offered the music for free download and streaming across a variety of websites, with an often-changing track listing and several different cover artworks. Demons Run Amok Entertainment's official vinyl and digital release was finally issued on July 8, 2016.

The extended play was recorded at Wisner Productions in Davie, Florida and was co-produced by recording engineer James Paul Wisner and founding band member and principal songwriter Damien Moyal. The release features Moyal performing all of the vocals and acoustic guitar, Matthew Crum supplying drums, percussion and synthesizers, Wisner providing electric bass guitar and electric guitar, and Juan Montoya contributing electric guitar. Wisner later re-mixed and remastered the songs in 2016 for the Demons Run Amok Entertainment release.

Stay Black features the single "The New Cleavage", for which the band filmed a music video with director Dwid Hellion while visiting Belgium in November 2003. Three more music videos were scheduled to be filmed in 2004, but were abandoned when Good Life Recordings shelved the release. "The New Cleavage" and "Dude Becomes Sea" were both used to promote Demons Run Amok Entertainment's release in 2016.

== Composition and recording ==
=== Background ===
Vocalist Damien Moyal had previously fronted such hardcore punk, metallic hardcore and melodic hardcore bands as Culture, Shai Hulud, Morning Again, Bird of Ill Omen, As Friends Rust and Bridgeburne R during the 1990s and early 2000s. In mid-February 2002, while recording As Friends Rust's A Young Trophy Band in the Parlance of Our Times at Wisner Productions in Davie, Florida with producer James Paul Wisner, Moyal tracked a solo song, not originally planned for the release. The song, "Up and Went", featured Moyal on vocals and electric guitar (borrowed from As Friends Rust guitarist Christopher Beckham), with Wisner contributing additional electric guitar and synthesizer. Moyal later singled out the song as his first non-lyrical composition, and a precursor to his solo project, Damien Done.

Moyal wound up quitting Gainesville, Florida-based As Friends Rust in late February 2002, less than two weeks after recording A Young Trophy Band in the Parlance of Our Times, citing dissatisfaction with touring, wanting to focus on school and his then-girlfriend, and loss of interest in the mainstream musical direction in which the new members were taking the band. Not wanting to abandon music completely, yet unwilling to take part in the dynamics of a new band, Moyal began tinkering with the idea of working on more solo material. Though he did not own a guitar, nor knew how to play the instrument, his at-the-time girlfriend was a musician and he borrowed her acoustic guitar to start writing material.

"I simply got sick of screaming. I stopped being content with punk and hardcore years ago, and towards the end of As Friends Rust, I was making very deliberate attempts to contradict the music, vocally. I think, to be honest, that I became so frustrated with the sorry state of hardcore (and the mundane, stagnant styles that were pervading the entire scene and the As Friends Rust songwriting) that I started to mock it. However, it made the songs more interesting, and that's when it occurred to me that I just needed to let that beast loose." "I had never played an instrument in my life, but my girlfriend at the time was a guitarist, so I started tooling around with her guitar and writing basically the minute I quit As Friends Rust. I had no ambitions of recording or playing live, but I did need to exercise that songwriting muscle, and Damien Done was the result."

Moyal initially named his new solo project Rubbers, a name he picked because of its deliberate lack of seriousness (rubbers being a colloquial term for condoms). However, once the recording of the band's debut extended play, Love Thongs, was completed and turned out much better than he had anticipated, Moyal wanted to give the project a more appropriate name. He briefly considered using his own name, but ultimately settled on the moniker Damien Done, as he felt it was less pretentious and offered multiple meanings:

"The project was originally called Rubbers, but the name was abandoned because the recording ended up sounding much more serious than the name. Normally, I'd enjoy that polarity, but I felt it was a bit goofy, so I decided to change it. I considered using Damien Moyal, but I just couldn't take it seriously. Damien Done encompassed the solemn, pessimistic vibe that seems to underlay the sound, so I feel like it's perfect." "I considered Damien Moyal, but it felt wrong, like I was implying that my name means something. I thought about it and came to a compromise... Using my first name is effective in conveying that this is indeed a solo project, but using a fictitious last name frees me from the hesitancy I felt about my real name. It also goes well with the bleak nature of a lot of my songs. "Done", like "settled"."

=== Song development, influences and writing style ===
Being new to musical composition, Moyal approached songwriting without deliberate similarity to his past hardcore and metal bands, instead citing influences like Glenn Danzig, Nick Cave, Iggy Pop, Pixies, Black Sabbath, Alice in Chains, Radio Birdman and Velvet Underground. The music ended up sounding bluesy and grungy, with a metal influence present in his guitar playing style. In retrospective interviews, Moyal pointed out that Damien Done's early songs lacked traditional structure, but that this was not done intentionally. All of the music was written and arranged using an acoustic guitar, and in the process, he discovered a new appreciation for composing and arranging music, one which he had previously never been subject to as a vocalist and lyricist.

Moyal's softer and cleaner vocal delivery utilized in Damien Done stemmed from a transition developed over the years, especially during his time in As Friends Rust. In comparison to his harsher and screamier, at times growling, vocals in Culture, Shai Hulud, Morning Again and Bird of Ill Omen, his singing delivery in As Friends Rust, and later Damien Done, was deliberately cleaner and more conversational, intended to create an intimate connection with listeners.

“Dude Becomes Sea” was the first proper song written for Damien Done. It's lyrics tell the story of a man who is a prisoner on a slave ship, and who organizes a mutiny to overthrow the crew and wreck the ship in a final coup at freedom, knowing that they will all die in the process. The man's spirit then becomes one with the sea, occupying most of the planet, though he holds resentment for no longer being on land and begins to mess with other sea vessels.

"Here Comes the Plague" was written about Moyal's feeling as an outcast, as one with whom no one should become involved. He further developed the situation into a story of a man who destroys everything with which and everyone with whom he comes into contact.

"I Want to Solve the Problems in Your Dress" deals with adultery. It depicts an affair from the perspective of "the other man", who becomes so infatuated and obsessed with his lover, a married woman, that he wishes the death of her husband. Moyal would further utilize this theme during the writing of Damien Done's album Charm Offensive throughout 2016 and 2017, with many off-beat love songs told from the perspective of "the other party".

"The New Cleavage" (originally titled "Ass-Crack Is the New Cleavage") is a story about a man who has been put through the wringer by his girlfriend, a chronic cheater and psychic vampire. After being in this toxic relationship, he struggles to find a way out, and uses his last bit of dignity to free himself.

"She's About to Lose It" tells the story of a woman, with each of the three verses of the song detailing different devastating losses in her life. In the first verse, she loses her virginity, not in a manner which she had envisioned. In the second verse, she loses her baby in the third trimester of pregnancy. In the third and final verse, she loses control and murders her partner.

"Catsong" was conceived at a later time from the other five songs on the release. Moyal had written the main guitar riff but was unsure how to use it. While at Crum's home studio one evening, Moyal recorded the guitar track and Crum added keyboards. The song was named as such because it included a sample of Crum's cat, Garth, purring and meowing.

=== Label interest and recording ===
With only a handful of rough bedroom recordings, Damien Done (at the time still named Rubbers) was quickly signed by Edward Verhaeghe to his Belgian record label Good Life Recordings in the summer of 2003. Good Life Recordings had previously released material by several of Moyal's bands, including Morning Again, Culture, As Friends Rust and Shai Hulud, as well as distributing Bird of Ill Omen's releases in Europe.

In early September 2003, Moyal entered Wisner Productions in Davie Florida, where he had previously recorded with As Friends Rust on numerous occasions, to track five songs with producer James Paul Wisner. Handling vocals and acoustic guitar, Moyal recorded five songs: "Dude Becomes Sea", "Here Comes the Plague", "I Want to Solve the Problems in Your Dress", "The New Cleavage" and "She's About to Lose It". He then invited Matthew Crum (formerly of As Friends Rust and The Rocking Horse Winner) to contribute drums, percussion and synthesizers to nearly every song. Crum subsequently joined the band and the pair recorded a sixth tune, "Catsong", at Crum's home studio, which was then mixed at Wisner Productions.

Wisner, who recorded and mixed the full session, also provided electric guitar and bass guitar to the songs "Dude Becomes Sea", "Here Comes the Plague" and "The New Cleavage", the last of which also featured electric guitar by Juan Montoya (formerly of Floor and Cavity, and later of Torche).

== Delays and expansion ==
=== Original title and sequencing ===
Moyal originally titled his solo project's debut extended play Love Thongs, a pun on Love Songs. With the recording completed, two songs ("Here Comes the Plague" and "Dude Becomes Sea") were made available to stream or download from Rubbers' new MP3.com page and from Good Life Recordings' website on September 16, 2003. On October 1, 2003, "She's About to Lose It" was added to the MP3.com page.

A handful of CD-Rs were burned in November 2003, which featured artwork baring Moyal's own name, as he was in a transitional period between using "Rubbers" and "Damien Done". The original song sequencing placed "Here Comes the Plague" as the extended play's opener, followed by "Dude Becomes Sea"; the two songs were later switched when the release was re-titled Stay Black in 2006. The original version also positioned "Catsong" after thirty seconds of silence, presenting it as an unlisted bonus track.

On December 5, 2003, Good Life Recordings sent out a press release revealing Damien Done as its newest band, and announced that Love Thongs would be released as a CD and DVD combo (catalog GL095) in early April 2004. On January 19, 2004, Damien Done launched its official website, and on February 6, 2004, downloadable audio tracks of "Ass-Crack Is the New Cleavage" and "Dude Becomes Sea" were made available. "She's About to Lose It" was also added to the website on February 15, 2004, while "Ass-Crack Is the New Cleavage" was next offered for free download on Good Life Recordings' website, starting on February 23, 2004.

=== Music videos ===
In November 2003, Verhaeghe invited Moyal to Kortrijk, Belgium to film a music video for the lead single "The New Cleavage" (then still titled "Ass-Crack Is the New Cleavage"), the first of four music videos planned in promotion of Love Thongs, and set to be included on the accompanying DVD. The music video was directed by former Integrity vocalist Dwid Hellion, who had moved to Ghent, Belgium earlier that year.

Hellion and Verhaeghe devised the scenario and coordinated the shoot at a local bar in Kortrijk. The video featured Moyal casually drinking Duvel beer and smoking cigarettes in a sensuously-lit lounge, surrounded by Murielle Scherre's La Fille D'O models dressed in lingerie and bikinis. The music video was sensationalized in press releases by Verhaeghe, who described it as "very controversial". Verhaeghe was motivated by the fact that Moyal had once been straight edge in the 1990s, and fronted several bands (notably Culture) that were vocal about abstaining from drinking and smoking.

Two different edits of the music video were planned, one was a PG-rated version, the other R-rated, though the more risqué version was never completed. The music video for "The New Cleavage" was hosted on several websites starting on February 6, 2004, including Damien Done's, Good Life Recordings', La Fille D'O's, and Dwid Hellion's. On February 27, 2004, however, Moyal announced that the music video had been withdrawn from circulation so that it could be re-edited, though it continued to be shared on other websites as a new version was never completed. The second music video from Love Thongs was scheduled to be for "Here Comes the Plague", and was planned to be filmed in February 2004 in Gainesville, Florida, but it never came to fruition.

=== Release delays and new members ===
By April 2004, Good Life Recordings had already pushed back Love Thongs' release. The extended play was eventually rescheduled for the fall of 2004, and as such, Verhaeghe printed promotional flyers for the release and included the song "The New Cleavage" on his label's Various Artists compilation, Good Life Recordings Presents: Never Surrender - The Best New Underground Music 2004-2005. The Various Artists compilation was released on compact disc on October 25, 2004, and marked Damien Done's first official release; it also wound up being Good Life Recordings' sole output of the band's material, as Love Thongs was ultimately never released.

Crum having since departed, former I Hate Myself and Gunmoll drummer Jon Marberger joined Damien Done in early April 2004. The band looked for a guitarist and bass guitarist, hoping to play concerts, but things came to a halt when Moyal moved from Gainesville to Miami, Florida in June 2004. On June 8, 2004, the band created a Myspace page, where several still-unreleased Love Thongs songs were uploaded. On August 17, 2004, Moyal announced that a new band line-up had been assembled in Miami, including former Shai Hulud, Cavity, 108, Against All Authority and Where Fear and Weapons Meet drummer (and then-member of Hazen Street and Until the End) Jason Lederman, and former Where Fear and Weapons Meet, Dashboard Confessional and Seville bass guitarist Daniel Bonebrake. In celebration, a Damien Done PureVolume page was created where the same songs from Love Thongs were made available for streaming.

=== Expanding the release ===
As early as February 2004, Moyal revealed that Damien Done's second release was in preparation. Originally announced as You've Been Dicked Down by the Left Hand of God, but later re-titled Bits of Happy, Moyal began demoing material for it alone at his home studio. In retrospective interviews, Moyal revealed that Verhaeghe had expressed reservations about releasing Love Thongs, and insisted that the former record additional material at his own expense to upgrade the release from an extended play into a full-length album.

In hopes of pleasing Verhaeghe, Moyal recorded and produced a series of new songs at his home studio between 2004 and 2006. These included "March Towards Blackness", "Gimme the Mouth", "Jesus Train", "The Saints That Ain't", "Lighten Up (Live in Sao Paulo, Brazil)" (which was not a live track but rather a studio recording, and was later re-recorded in 2016), "Saturday", "It's a Piano Thing", "Shame" and "Palomita Asustada" (also known as "When You Left Your Home", which was later re-recorded in 2016 for Charm Offensive), most of which were shared with fans on the band's Myspace page. Moyal, however, was apprehensive about adding this material to Love Thongs, as he felt the songs did not measure up to the quality of the studio material recorded in 2003.

In the process of revamping the release, several changes were made, including the swapping of the first two songs' positions ("Here Comes the Plague" and "Dude Becomes Sea"), the dropping of "Catsong", designing new artwork, and finally, the re-titling of Love Thongs to Stay Black. Although "Catsong" was dropped from this version of Stay Black, the song appeared on the soundtrack to the Vice magazine travel documentary The Vice Guide to Travel, released on CD (soundtrack) and DVD (documentary) on October 3, 2006.

The full-length album version of Stay Black was slated for release through Good Life Recordings in the spring of 2006, but it was again held back. Since Good Life Recordings had financed the recording of Love Thongs (and half of Stay Black), as well as the production of the music video for "The New Cleavage", Moyal was unable to shop the release around to other record labels and was forced to wait in hopes that Verhaeghe would finally come through. The record label ultimately never offered a reason for its delay and eventual cancellation. In September 2006, Moyal relocated to Ann Arbor, Michigan and Damien Done was put on hold for nearly two years.

=== Further expansion and soundtrack appearances ===
In early 2008, Moyal resumed working on Damien Done material. In his Ann Arbor home studio, he recorded and produced another series of songs planned for Stay Black, including "Five Seconds" (also known as "Live and Die"), "Everybody Loves You" (a cover of Cop Shoot Cop, which was later re-recorded in 2014) "Saw-Whet", "Take Care of Yourself", "Drone Ranger" and "Untitled (A Lot)", most of which were shared with fans on the band's Myspace page. The new version of the release was again pitched to Good Life Recordings, but it remained unreleased.

"There were a few problems. When it was about to come out, Edward decided he wanted it to be a full length. So he wanted me to add songs. But there was no recording budget to add songs. That kind of killed the enthusiasm. I started recording, and that was good because it drove me to start figuring out how to record at home. But that early stuff was not ready to be on the same record as the songs I had recorded in the studio. I couldn’t see them all on the same release. It kind of just killed the morale. Then I would be ready, he wouldn’t be. When he was, then I wasn’t. Finally, at a certain point when we were both ready, it didn’t make sense on Good Life. The label had changed, it had been too long since my other bands had done things."

While waiting on Good Life Recordings, Scherre used six songs from Stay Black's various recording sessions on the soundtrack to La Fille D'O's soft porn anthology J'fais du porno et j'aime ça. The film was released on DVD on August 5, 2009, and included the songs "She's About to Lose It", "Untitled (A Lot)", "Saw-Whet", "I Want to Solve the Problems in Your Dress", "Saturday" and "Awkward, Fun, Clumsy and Cute", in addition to As Friends Rust's song "Where the Wild Things Were". This collaboration gave way to Moyal composing an original soundtrack to Scherre and Jennifer Lyon Bell's Belgian soft porn film Des jours plus belles que la nuit (also known as Skin. Like. Sun.), which premiered on October 10, 2009, and was later released on DVD through Blue Artichoke Films in April 2011.

== Release and packaging ==
=== Digital releases and changing artwork ===
By 2010, Moyal had given up hope that Good Life Recordings would release Stay Black. He quietly uploaded the most recent version of the release to his personal website, offering it for free download to anyone who stumbled upon it. The artwork designed for this version bared the title Stay Black, along with the subtitle The Love Thongs EP • The Bits of Happy EP, to differentiate the difference in sound between the professional studio tracks and the home-recorded tracks. The release featured all six songs recorded in 2003 (including "Catsong"), plus "Jesus Train", "The Saints That Ain't", "Lighten Up (Live in Sao Paulo, Brazil)" and "When You Left Your Home" from the 2004–2006 home-recorded sessions, and "Take Care of Yourself" and "Untitled (A Lot)" from the 2008 home-recorded sessions. The same version of the album was offered on Damien Done's new Bandcamp page on August 20, 2011. Moyal simultaneously offered two other limited digital releases through Bandcamp: Outtakes & Rarities and Electron(ish).

In December 2011, Moyal trimmed down Stay Black back into an extended play, removing all non-Wisner Productions recorded songs (including "Catsong"). The new digital offering was available through Damien Done's Bandcamp page with the artwork that Moyal had designed for the release back in 2005–2006. In 2013, the cover art was changed again to a photograph of people walking in the street.

=== Remixing and proper release ===
In late 2015, Marcel Erdmann, owner of German record label Demons Run Amok Entertainment, showed interest in properly releasing Stay Black. Like Good Life Recordings, Demons Run Amok Entertainment had released material by Moyal's other bands, including Culture and As Friends Rust in May 2015, and Morning Again and On Bodies in September 2015. Erdmann had to license the rights to release Say Black from Good Life Recordings.

The renewed interest in Stay Black motivated Moyal to finally compose fresh material for Damien Done, after several years of inactivity. He quickly composed two new songs, "He Really Tried" and "And Now the Rain", which were recorded in February 2016, and scheduled to be released on a companion 7-inch vinyl to the upcoming Stay Black 12-inch vinyl. Moyal revised Stay Black's track listing by reinstating "Catsong", and had Wisner re-mix and remaster the release. Stay Black was finally officially released after thirteen years, on a limited edition white 12-inch vinyl and digitally by Demons Run Amok Entertainment on July 8, 2016.

An all-new artwork and layout was designed for this edition using photographs from Alison Brady's 2011 exhibition, "Sincerely Yours". Moyal had long-admired Brady's work and had earlier considered her photographs for Stay Black's artwork, during the end of the release's Good Life Recordings era. He quickly approached her again for the Demons Run Amok Entertainment version, because he felt that her pictures captured a contrast between beauty and darkness; what is seen and what is hidden, which reflected many of Damien Done's themes and lyrics. Moyal continued using the visual theme of hidden faces on future Damien Done cover artworks.

== Critical reception and recognition ==
Professional ratings
Review scores
Source	Rating
7evenam	Positive
Between the Lines	Positive
Kerrang!	Positive
Polyprisma	Positive
Power Metal	7/10 stars
Soundscape	8/10 stars
The Moshville Times	Positive
The New Noise	Positive
The Punk Archive	Mixed
Underdog	Positive

Stay Black and Damien Done received overall positive critical acclaim upon the album's release. Most reviewers had difficulty choosing a single genre to categorize the release, describing it as "difficult to pigeonhole", "incomparable sound", "many styles that would confuse some of the folks out on the street", "interesting blend of genres with a great unique edge", "mix of acoustic and electric", yet "accessible". Kerrang! described the extended play's sound as "dark, angular, art-rock that blends acoustic guitar with sung vocals", while Underdog called it "balladesque tones and acoustic-spherical rock"

Overall, critics categorized Stay Black as rock and roll, minimalist, and acoustic. Many described it as acoustic punk rock, blues, and stoner rock, while others thought it was doom rock, indie rock, psychedelic rock, and also incorporated elements of funk and country. Damien Done was compared to such artists as Danzig, Chuck Ragan, Johnny Cash, David Judson Clemmons, Danko Jones, Monster Magnet, A Pale Horse Named Death, Alice in Chains, and Soundgarden.

The music was commonly described by the press as "a mixture of emotion, honesty and punk-rooted", heavy, dark, melancholic, driving, soulful, multi-layered, unsettling. Some characterized it a "contagious cheerfulness", "frightening calm", "undermining atmosphere", and with "brooding vocals".

Between the Lines noted "With his Damien Done project, Damien Moyal now proves that his creative potential is far from exhausted", while The New Noise expressed that he had "reached maturity as a songwriter". Others also praised his songwriting and lyrics, described as "honest and complex". The Moshville Times praised the artwork as "haunting" and compared it to René Magritte's work.

== Track listing ==
All music and lyrics written by Moyal. Credits are adapted from the EP's liner notes.

No.	Title	Length
1.	"Dude Becomes Sea"	5:48
2.	"Here Comes the Plague"	4:15
3.	"I Want to Solve the Problems in Your Dress"	5:02
4.	"The New Cleavage"	3:30
5.	"She's About to Lose It"	5:05
6.	"Catsong"	2:00
Total length:		25:40

== Personnel ==
Credits are adapted from the album's liner notes.

Damien Done

- Damien Moyal – vocals, acoustic guitar (tracks 1–5), electric guitar (track 6)
- Matthew Crum – drums (tracks 1–2, 4), percussion (tracks 2–4, 6), synthesizer (tracks 1–6)

Guest musicians

- Juan Montoya – electric guitar (track 4)
- James Paul Wisner – electric bass guitar, electric guitar (tracks 1–2, 4)

Production

- James Paul Wisner – recording engineer (tracks 1–5), mixer, re-mixer, producer (tracks 1-6) at Wisner Productions
- Matthew Crum – recording engineer (track 6)
- Damien Moyal – producer, artwork, design
- Alison Brady – photography

== Release history ==
Release formats for Stay Black
Region	Date	Label	Format	Catalog
United States	October 2003	Self-released	CD-R	
United States	2010	Self-released	Digital	
United States	December 2011	Self-released	Digital	
United States	2013	Self-released	Digital	
Germany	July 8, 2016	Demons Run Amok Entertainment	Digital	DRA118
Germany	July 8, 2016	Demons Run Amok Entertainment	LP	DRA118
