= Morgan Nicholls =

British musician

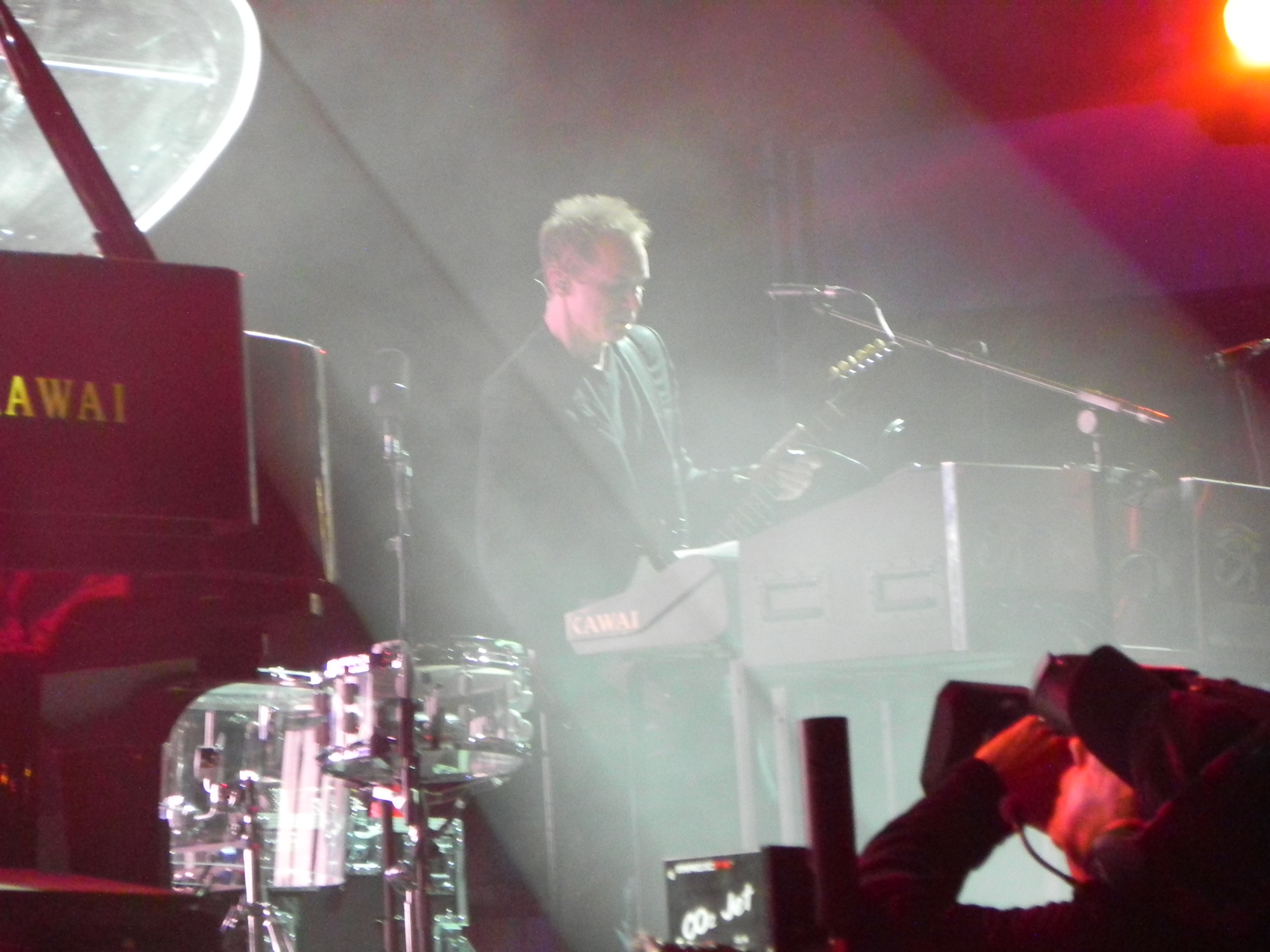

Background information
- Born: Morgan Daniel Nicholls; London, England
- Genres: Alternative rock; indie rock; punk rock; hip hop
- Occupations: Musician, songwriter, record producer
- Instruments: Bass; keyboards; vocals; percussion; guitar
- Years active: 1989–present

Morgan Daniel Nicholls is an English musician, a member of English pop band Senseless Things who is best known for performing with Muse, Gorillaz, The Streets and Lily Allen. He has released one solo album under the mononym Morgan.

== Career ==
Nicholls began his career with Senseless Things, with whom he released four studio albums between 1989 and 1995. He was subsequently involved with Vent 414 until 1997. In 2002, Morgan was involved as a producer on QueenAdreena's Drink Me. In August 2004, he temporarily joined the alternative rock band Muse at the V Festival, filling in for bassist Chris Wolstenholme who had broken his wrist playing football.

In 2005, Morgan Nicholls joined Gorillaz to play bass guitar on their Demon Detour Radio Tour. Morgan knew the band from his friendship with Gorillaz co-creator Jamie Hewlett. In 2005 and 2006 he joined the live band for a live set of show for Demon Days, playing two 5 night residencies at the Manchester Opera House in Manchester and the Apollo Theater in Harlem, New York.

In 2006, Muse recruited Nicholls as a touring member on keys, percussion and guitar; he performed with them until 2022, when he revealed on Twitter he would not be joining the band for the Will of the People Tour that year. He was replaced by Dan Lancaster.

Nicholls was the tour director and bassist for Lily Allen on the first half of her 2009 world tour.

Nicholls was composer of the theme tune for the Bravo reality television series Ladies of London.

In late 2018, Nicholls, Cass Browne, Ade Emsley and Des Murphy, formed a psychedelic-punk band, Circle 60. They released their first EP, SawnOff Shot Gold, in 2019.

== Discography ==
=== Solo ===
==== Albums ====
- 2000: Organized

==== Singles ====
- 1999: "Miss Parker"
- 1999: "Soul Searching"
- 2000: "Flying High"
- 2000: "Sitting in the Sun"

==== EPs ====
- 2012: Moonlight Rhino (Includes 3 songs; Moonlight Rhino, Sydney Sunset and Balloon Busting)

=== with Senseless Things ===
- 1989: Postcard C.V.
- 1991: The First of Too Many
- 1993: Empire of the Senseless
- 1995: Taking Care of Business

=== with Vent 414 ===
- 1996: Vent 414

=== with Gorillaz ===
- 2005: Demon Days: Live at the Manchester Opera House
- 2006: Demon Days: Live at New York’s Apollo Theatre

=== with Muse ===
- 2008: HAARP
- 2013: Live at Rome Olympic Stadium
- 2018: Muse: Drones World Tour
- 2020: Muse – Simulation Theory

=== with Circle 60 ===
- 2019: SawnOff ShotGold

== Personal life ==
Nicholls is the son of Billy Nicholls, singer, songwriter, record producer and musical director, who had contributed backing vocals to his son's recordings.
