= The Diamond Head Anthology: Am I Evil? =

Compilation album by Diamond Head
- Released: 24 November 2004
- Recorded: Old Smithy Recording Studio, Worcester, England, 2004
- Genre: Heavy metal
- Length: 152:56
- Label: Sanctuary Records Group
- Producer: Reg Fellows

Diamond Head chronology
Death and Progress (1993)	The Diamond Head Anthology: Am I Evil? (2004)	All Will Be Revealed (2005)

Professional ratings
Review scores
Source	Rating
AllMusic	4.5/5 stars

The Diamond Head Anthology: Am I Evil? is a compilation album by British heavy metal band Diamond Head, released via Sanctuary Records. It features some of their most famous songs, which have been remastered. The album also features two live versions and an acoustic version of the song "Lightning to the Nations".

== Track listing ==
Disc one
No.	Title	Length
1.	"Am I Evil?"	7:40
2.	"Lightning to the Nations"	4:12
3.	"The Prince"	6:24
4.	"It's Electric"	3:35
5.	"Sucking My Love"	9:29
6.	"Helpless"	6:53
7.	"Shoot Out the Lights"	4:13
8.	"We Won't Be Back"	4:16
9.	"I Don't Got"	4:20
10.	"Play It Loud"	3:28
11.	"Dead Reckoning"	3:31
12.	"In the Heat of the Night"	4:56
13.	"To Heaven from Hell"	6:13

Disc two
No.	Title	Length
1.	"Call Me"	3:51
2.	"Borrowed Time"	7:38
3.	"Makin' Music"	3:50
4.	"Out of Phase"	3:33
5.	"To the Devil His Due"	6:01
6.	"Knight of the Swords"	6:50
7.	"Ishmael"	4:02
8.	"Truckin'"	3:06
9.	"Calling Your Name"	4:06
10.	"I Can't Help Myself"	3:38
11.	"Run"	4:44
12.	"Home"	4:42
13.	"To Heaven from Hell" (live)	5:53
14.	"To the Devil His Due" (live)	6:08
15.	"Lightning to the Nations" (acoustic version)	3:05
