= Behold the Beginning =

Compilation album by Diamond Head
- Released: April 1986
- Genre: Heavy metal
- Label: Metal Masters
- Producer: Diamond Head

Diamond Head chronology
Canterbury (1983)	Behold the Beginning (1986)	Am I Evil (1987)

Professional ratings
Review scores
Source	Rating
AllMusic	4.5/5 stars
Collector's Guide to Heavy Metal	7/10

Behold the Beginning is a compilation album by the heavy metal band Diamond Head. It was released after their poorly received Canterbury album and subsequent break-up and is composed mostly of tracks from the band's first album, Lightning to the Nations, as well as the non-LP single "Waited Too Long" and its B-side "Play It Loud". The album was remixed by the band's guitarist, Brian Tatler.

Behold the Beginning was re-released in 1991 by Heavy Metal Records in CD format.

== Track listing ==
No.	Title	Length
1.	"Am I Evil?" (only on US editions)	7:42
2.	"It's Electric"	3:34
3.	"The Prince"	6:13
4.	"Sucking My Love"	9:30
5.	"Streets of Gold"	3:33
6.	"Play It Loud"	3:18
7.	"Shoot Out the Lights"	4:06
8.	"Sweet and Innocent"	3:32
9.	"Waited Too Long"	4:29
10.	"Helpless"	6:51

== Credits ==
- Brian Tatler – guitar, vocals
- Sean Harris – vocals
- Duncan Scott – drums
- Colin Kimberley – bass
