= The Best of Diamond Head =

Greatest hits album by Diamond Head
- Released: 1999
- Genre: Heavy metal
- Label: Half Moon Records

Diamond Head chronology
To Heaven from Hell	The Best of Diamond Head	Live – In the Heat of the Night

The Best of Diamond Head is a compilation album by British heavy metal band Diamond Head, released by Half Moon Records in 1999. It is the band's most comprehensive attempt at a definitive greatest hits. Although the record was released in 1999 it does not contain any material off their 1992 studio release Death and Progress. It also does not contain one of Diamond Head's most popular songs, "The Prince" (from their 1980 debut, Lightning to the Nations), which features regularly in their lives sets and is one of their more well-known songs since Metallica covered it on their Garage Inc. release.

Metallica's drummer Lars Ulrich assisted in the mixing of this album, due to Diamond Head's influence on his and James Hetfield's musical style.

Professional ratings
Review scores
Source	Rating
Allmusic	3/5 stars

== Track listing ==
All tracks are written by Brian Tatler and Sean Harris.

No.	Title	Length
1.	"It's Electric"	3:20
2.	"Shoot Out the Lights"	4:04
3.	"Helpless"	6:49
4.	"Sucking My Love"	9:30
5.	"In the Heat of the Night"	4:56
6.	"Call Me"	3:49
7.	"Lightning to the Nations"	4:08
8.	"Borrowed Time"	7:39
9.	"Am I Evil?"	7:20
10.	"Makin' Music"	3:50
11.	"Out of Phase"	3:32
12.	"Ishmael"	3:58
13.	"To the Devil His Due"	6:57
