= To Heaven from Hell =

Studio album by Diamond Head
- Released: 1997
- Genre: Heavy metal
- Label: Metal Blade
- Producer: Diamond Head

Diamond Head chronology
The Friday Rock Show Sessions / Live At Reading (1992)	To Heaven from Hell (1997)	The Best of Diamond Head (1999)

To Heaven from Hell is an EP by British heavy metal band Diamond Head. Although all the songs on the EP were initially released on 1982's Borrowed Time, it is a collection of Diamond Head's early demos from before their debut album Lightning to the Nations was released. The album gives an insight to how the band initially wished their songs to sound before MCA tried to commercialize Diamond Head.

Many of the songs have a much more raw feel about to them compared with their initial appearance on Borrowed Time.

== Track listing ==
All songs by Harris, Kimberly, Scott, Tatler.

1. "Dead Reckoning"
2. "Heat of the Night"
3. "Borrowed Time"
4. "Don't You Ever Leave Me"
5. "To Heaven from Hell"

== Credits ==
- Brian Tatler – guitar, vocals
- Sean Harris – vocals
- Duncan Scott – drums
- Colin Kimberly – bass
