= Sweet and Innocent =

Sweet and Innocent may refer to:

- "Sweet and Innocent" (Donny Osmond song)
- "Sweet and Innocent" (Diamond Head song)
- Sweet and Innocent (album), a compilation album by Diamond Head
