= Live – In the Heat of the Night =

Live album by Diamond Head
- Released: 2000
- Recorded: 1991
- Genre: Heavy metal
- Length: 71:43
- Label: Zoom Club Records
- Producer: Steve Guard

Diamond Head chronology
The Best of Diamond Head	Live – In the Heat of the Night	Am I Evil? – The Anthology

Live – In the Heat of the Night is a live album by British heavy metal band Diamond Head, recorded at the Wolverhampton Wulfrun Hall during their 1991 comeback tour. It was originally a video bootleg, but was released on the insistence of their manager Steve Guard in 2000, in tribute to the band's live sound after their breakup after the Death and Progress album in 1994. It contains a thank-you note from vocalist Sean Harris on the inner sleeve. The band ended up reforming in late 2000 to perform some acoustic numbers in order to promote this album with Floyd Brennan ending in the release of the First Cuts EP.

This live album consists of two discs. The first is an audio recording of the show, whilst the second is video of the concert, although neither disc captures the entire show. The set started with "Wild on the Streets", which does on appear on the album, nor does the encore, Diamond Head's flagship "Am I Evil?". The second disc captures even less of the show, as it starts filming at "Feels Good" and films up until "Run".

The album contains several unreleased songs, such as "Let Me Down Easy" and "She Comes Down", as well as a medley of cover songs at the end of disc one, which was rare for Diamond Head.

== Track listing ==
Disc One: CD
No.	Title	Length
1.	"Lightning to the Nations"	3:46
2.	"Feels Good"	3:22
3.	"I Can't Help Myself"	3:42
4.	"In the Heat of the Night"	4:54
5.	"Calling Your Name"	4:29
6.	"She Comes Down"	3:59
7.	"Sucking My Love"	7:55
8.	"Let Me Down Easy"	3:49
9.	"Borrowed Time"	6:08
10.	"Run"	5:21
11.	"To Heaven from Hell"	5:56
12.	"Makin' Music"	6:06
13.	"Home"	4:42
14.	"Medley" ("Helpless", "My Generation", "Oh Well", "Hocus Pocus", "Riff Raff" & "It's Electric")	8:11
Total length:		71:40

Disc Two: DVD
No.	Title	Length
1.	"Feels Good"	3:22
2.	"I Can't Help Myself"	3:42
3.	"In the Heat of the Night"	4:54
4.	"Calling Your Name"	4:29
5.	"She Comes Down"	3:59
6.	"Sucking My Love"	7:55
7.	"Let Me Down Easy"	3:49
8.	"Borrowed Time"	6:08
9.	"Run"	5:21

== Lineup ==
- Sean Harris – vocals
- Brian Tatler – guitar
- Eddie "Chaos" Moohan – bass, backing vocals
- Karl Wilcox – drums
