= Four Cuts (EP) =

1982 extended play by Diamond Head

EP by Diamond Head
- Released: 1982
- Genre: Heavy metal
- Label: MCA

Diamond Head chronology
Call Me (1982)	Four Cuts (1982)	In the Heat of the Night (1982)

Four Cuts is an EP by heavy metal band Diamond Head and was released in 1982. It was a double A-side with "Call Me" and "Trick or Treat", and was released by MCA. The EP also contained "Dead Reckoning" and a re-recorded version of "Shoot Out the Lights" as the two B-sides. This was the band's first release on a major label, and was designed to be a taster for their second album.

"Call Me" was later released as a single in its own right later that same year. The song also appeared on Diamond Head's second studio album, Borrowed Time, their first album to be released by MCA. "Trick or Treat" and "Dead Reckoning" were favourites in the band's live set during the 80s. However, neither song made it onto the Borrowed Time album until it was re-released in 2007 by Polish based label Metal Mind Productions (this release was limited to 2000 copies until Geffen Records put the remastered album, along with the band's third album Canterbury, on general release). This was the first time that Trick or Treat was available on CD format. A demo version of Dead Reckoning was later available on the band's 1987 compilation album Am I Evil. The original version of "Shoot Out the Lights" was previously released as an A-side in 1981 on the band's own label, Happy Face Records. The re-recorded version here was included on the 2007 re-release of Borrowed Time.

Professional ratings
Review scores
Source	Rating
AllMusic	3/5 stars

== Track listing ==
No.	Title	Length
1.	"Call Me"	3:55
2.	"Trick or Treat"	3:30
3.	"Dead Reckoning"	3:31
4.	"Shoot Out the Lights" (re-recorded version)	3:23

== Personnel ==
- Brian Tatler
- Sean Harris
- Duncan Scott
- Colin Kimberley
