= Diamond Head =

Diamond Head or Diamondhead may refer to:

== Film and television ==
- Diamondhead, a character in the television series Ben 10
- Diamond Head (film), 1963
- The Diamond Head Game, a 1975 American game show
- Code Name: Diamond Head, a 1977 American TV movie

== Music ==
- Diamond Head (British band), a British heavy metal band formed in 1976
  - Diamond Head (Diamond Head album), Diamond Head's self-titled seventh studio album
- Diamond Head (Japanese band), a Japanese pop/rock band formed in 2000
- Diamond Head (Phil Manzanera album), a 1975 album by Phil Manzanera
- Diamondhead (album), a 2008 album by jazz saxophonist David "Fathead" Newman
- "Diamond Head", an instrumental song by The Beach Boys from the 1968 album Friends
- "Diamond Head" (song), an instrumental song by The Ventures from the 1964 album Walk, Don't Run, Vol. 2
- "Life After Diamond Head", an instrumental song by Men Without Hats from the 1991 album Sideways

== Places ==
- Diamondhead, Arkansas
- Diamond Head (British Columbia), Canada, secondary peak on Mt. Garibaldi
- Diamond Head, Hawaii, volcanic cone on the Hawaiian island of Oahu
- Diamondhead, Mississippi

== Other uses ==
- Diamondhead (comics), a Marvel Comics character
- USS Diamond Head (AE-19), a 1945 World War II and Cold War ammunition supply ship
