= Evil Live =

Live album by Diamond Head
- Released: 1994
- Genre: Heavy metal
- Length: 40:23; 27:36
- Label: Castle Communications

Diamond Head chronology
| Death and Progress (1993) | Evil Live (1994) | All Will Be Revealed (2005) |

Professional ratings
Review scores
| Source | Rating |
|---|---|
| AllMusic | 3/5 stars |

Evil Live is a live album by British heavy metal band Diamond Head; it is the band's fifth recording, and a double CD. The main album was recorded live at the National Bowl in Milton Keynes, UK in 1993; the second CD, Evil Extras, features cover versions and previously unreleased tracks.

== Track listing ==
Disc one: Evil Live
| No. | Title | Length |
|---|---|---|
| 1. | "Am I Evil?" | 7:00 |
| 2. | "Dust" | 4:36 |
| 3. | "Truckin'" | 3:09 |
| 4. | "To the Devil His Due" | 6:14 |
| 5. | "Sucking My Love" | 5:31 |
| 6. | "Run" | 4:52 |
| 7. | "To Heaven from Hell" | 5:53 |
| 8. | "Helpless" | 3:05 |

Disc two: Evil Extras
| No. | Title | Length |
|---|---|---|
| 1. | "Good Lovin' Gone Bad" (originally by Bad Company) | 3:44 |
| 2. | "This Flight Tonight" (originally by Joni Mitchell) | 3:33 |
| 3. | "Rock the Nation" (originally by Montrose) | 2:58 |
| 4. | "Good Rockin' Tonight" (originally by Montrose) | 2:36 |
| 5. | "Sweet Silence" (originally by Mr Big) | 4:46 |
| 6. | "Feels Good" | 3:07 |
| 7. | "Kiss of Fire" | 2:58 |
| 8. | "Let Me Down Easy" | 3:52 |
