= Call Me (EP) =

EP by Diamond Head
- Released: 1982
- Genre: Heavy metal
- Label: MCA

Diamond Head chronology
Diamond Eyes (1981)	Call Me (1982)	Four Cuts (1982)

Call Me is an EP by British heavy metal band Diamond Head, released in 1982 by MCA. It was a single A-side featuring "Call Me", with "Dead Reckoning" as the B-Side. The French release was only available on 7".

Both songs were popular in the band's live set, but only "Call Me" made it onto the band's 1982 album Borrowed Time. "Dead Reckoning" was later available on Diamond Head's 1987 compilation album Am I Evil. Both tracks had previously appeared on the Four Cuts EP.

As this was released through a major label, the band were able to produce a promotional video for this single. The video shows the band performing "Call Me" and was shot at the Manchester Odeon.

== Track listing ==
No.	Title	Length
1.	"Call Me"	3:55
2.	"Dead Reckoning"	3:31

== Lineup ==
- Brian Tatler
- Sean Harris
- Duncan Scott
- Colin Kimberley
