= Am I Evil (album) =

Compilation album by Diamond Head
- Released: 26 May 1987
- Genre: Heavy metal
- Length: 53:17
- Label: FM Revolver
- Producer: Diamond Head

Diamond Head chronology
Behold the Beginning (1986)	Am I Evil (1987)	Sweet and Innocent (1988)

Professional ratings
Review scores
Source	Rating
AllMusic	4.5/5 stars

Am I Evil is a compilation album by British heavy metal band Diamond Head. It was released in 1987 by FM-Revolver Records before being re-released by Heavy Metal Records in 1994.

This album contains early recordings of the tracks from Diamond Head's 1982 album Borrowed Time, except for the song "Call Me", plus two extra tracks, "Dead Reckoning" and "Sucking My Love". The latter was previously released on the band's 1980 debut album Lightning to the Nations. The former had already been released on two previous Diamond Head records. It appears on the Four Cuts EP and as a B-side to the single "Call Me"; both were released by MCA in 1982 (however, the 7" version of "Call Me" was only released in France).

Like Borrowed Time, this album's artwork was done by Rodney Matthews, a British Illustrator from Somerset who had previously worked with bands such as Thin Lizzy and Scorpions.

The songs off this compilation are much less polished compared to their Borrowed Time versions. Many fans prefer the versions of the songs on this album as many blamed Diamond Head's previous label, MCA, of trying to over commercialize the band.

== Track listing ==
No.	Title	Length
1.	"Am I Evil?"	7:48
2.	"Heat of the Night"	5:58
3.	"Don't You Ever Leave Me"	5:43
4.	"Borrowed Time"	6:54
5.	"To Heaven from Hell"	6:38
6.	"Dead Reckoning"	6:31
7.	"Lightning to the Nations"	4:18
8.	"Sucking My Love"	9:32

== Credits ==
- Brian Tatler – guitar, vocals
- Sean Harris – vocals
- Duncan Scott – drums
- Colin Kimberley – bass
