= The Friday Rock Show Sessions / Live at Reading =

Live album by Diamond Head
- Released: 1992
- Genre: Heavy metal
- Label: Raw Fruit Records
- Producer: Tony Wilson

Diamond Head chronology
Sweet and Innocent (album) (1988)	The Friday Rock Show Sessions / Live at Reading (1992)	Death and Progress (1993)

The Friday Night Rock Show Sessions / Live at Reading is a live album by British heavy metal band Diamond Head, released in 1992 as part of an official series of similar, radio-archive releases by several bands released with Raw Fruit Records. The Reading Festival performance was later included as part of a selection of bonus live tracks on The MCA Years, while the entire album was included on the compilation Live at the BBC.

Professional ratings
Review scores
Source	Rating
AllMusic	3/5 stars

== Track listing ==
All tracks are written by Sean Harris and Brian Tatler.

No.	Title	Length
1.	"Sweet and Innocent"	3:30
2.	"Lightning to the Nations"	4:18
3.	"Am I Evil?"	7:20
4.	"In the Heat of the Light"	5:47
5.	"Borrowed Time"	8:00
6.	"Don't You Ever Leave Me"	8:16
7.	"Sucking My Love"	8:36
8.	"Play It Loud"	7:21

== Notes ==
- Tracks 1–2 from BBC In Session 1980.
- Tracks 3–8 recorded at Reading Rock Festival, Reading, England on 27 August 1982 and broadcast on BBC Radio The Friday Rock Show, hosted by DJ Tommy Vance. There, Diamond Head were surprise late replacements for Manowar on the Friday night bill. This late replacement status accounts for the comment Sean Harris makes on the album that "I bet nobody expected us to be on 'ere tonight."
- The version of Sucking My Love on this album was previously released as a 12" single in 1983.

== Personnel ==
Band

- Brian Tatler – lead guitar
- Sean Harris – vocals, guitar
- Colin Kimberley – bass
- Duncan Scott – drums

Miscellaneous staff

- Tony Wilson – producer
- Jerry Paris – cover illustration
