= Restless Days =

Restless Days may refer to:

- "Restless Days" (song), a 1980 single by And Why Not?
- Restless Days (album), a 2009 album by The Clarks
