= What's in Your Head? =

Studio album by Diamond Head
- Released: 30 July 2007
- Genre: Hard rock, heavy metal
- Length: 49:41
- Label: Cargo
- Producer: Dave "Shirt" Nicholls, Brian Tatler

Diamond Head chronology
All Will Be Revealed (2005)	What's in Your Head? (2007)	Diamond Head (2016)

Professional ratings
Review scores
Source	Rating
AllMusic	3.5/5 stars
Blabbermouth	4/10

What's in Your Head? is the sixth album by British heavy metal band Diamond Head. This was Diamond Head's second and last album with singer Nick Tart, who would quit in 2014 due to long-distance issues arising when he had moved to Brisbane, Australia. While the previous album was produced by Diamond Head's drummer Karl Wilcox, the band this time worked with producer Dave Nicholls, who has previously worked with name bands such as Slipknot and Stone Sour. This is also the first album to feature guitarist Andy Abberley. Following its release, the band would focus primarily on touring and wouldn't release a full-length studio album till 2016, nearly a decade later. Tatler "had no interest in making a new album", Nick stated about Tatler during an interview in 2014 "he didn't feel the urge."

== Reception ==
Reception has been "generally mixed" upon release. A review from Blabbermouth called it generic hard rock crunch straight out of the soundtrack to a direct-to-video action flick. "Diamond Head are playing the kind of amiably shitty journeyman's rock that fills the record collection of a dwindling number of completists around the globe, music made by dudes who barely even saw the brass ring, but who are trundling through middle age still sucking in beer guts and facing a daily battle with the fact that they have no other life skills to fall back on."

A more positive review came from AllMusic where they applauded the group's efforts, stating that "Tatler still wields a pretty heavy axe." They also stated how What's in Your Head? includes a few tracks like "Skin on Skin" and "Victim" that would fit comfortably on such classic Diamond Head releases as Lightning to the Nations.

== Track listing ==
No.	Title	Writer(s)	Length
1.	"Skin on Skin"	Brian Tatler, Nick Tart	4:07
2.	"I Feel No Pain"	Tatler, Tart, Karl Wilcox	4:50
3.	"This Planet and Me"	Tatler, Tart, Wilcox	4:56
4.	"Reign Supreme"	Tatler, Tart	4:58
5.	"Killing Me"	Andy Abberley, Tatler, Tart	6:29
6.	"Tonight"	Tatler, Tart, Wilcox	3:30
7.	"Pray for Me"	Tatler, Tart	4:24
8.	"What's in Your Head?"	Tatler, Tart, Wilcox	4:12
9.	"Nothing to Lose"	Tatler, Tart, Dave Nicholls	4:31
10.	"Calling Out"	Tatler, Tart, Wilcox	3:47
11.	"Victim"	Tatler, Tart	3:57
12.	"This is War" (Japan exclusive bonus track)		3:01

== Personnel ==
- Nick Tart – vocals
- Brian Tatler – guitar
- Andy "Abbz" Abberley – guitar
- Eddie "Chaos" Moohan – bass
- Karl Wilcox – drums
