= Harry Sutcliffe =

British composer, musician and sound engineer

Harry Sutcliffe is a British composer, musician and sound engineer, probably best known for his sequencing and programming work with numerous British pop-music bands.

== Career ==
Sutcliffe began playing bass guitar and drums for various local bands before gaining a position at a local independent label, Wye Records who had previously been contracted with UB40. After gaining an experience with the A&R side of the business, to which Harry would later return, he worked as a freelance songwriter composing and arranging background music for television shows and commercials. His work on this front got him noticed and he subsequently gained work as a respected audio programmer particularly with regards to working on Oberheim_DMX and also Linn Drum LM1, as well as respected sound engineer in various studios working alongside numerous record producers including Pascal Gabriel, Hugh Padgham, Simon Fung, Christopher Neil, Ricki Wilde, Mike Batt, Axel Kröll, Chris Hughes and Mike Edwards. His studio and live work has included working with Deacon Blue, And Why Not, Aztec Camera, Meja, Janet Jackson, Level 42, Atomic Kitten, Richard Darbyshire, Ellis, Beggs and Howard, Andrew Roachford, Darren Hayes, The Corrs, Do, Living Colour, Eros Ramazzotti, EMF, Martine McCutcheon, Tears For Fears, Axel Bauer, Robbie Williams, Sonique, Lily Allen, Katie Melua, Gary Numan, Mecano, Garbage and Jesus Jones.

Sutcliffe latterly formed a group called There She Was, engineering as well producing their recorded material. This group had become known around the UK for their live performances and post-punk sound and often headlined local festivals with other successful bands including Pop Will Eat Itself and Ned's Atomic Dustbin.

== Post career ==
In the late 1990s he moved into the business side of the music industry, initially within A&R for Arista Records working closely with Blondie, Natalie Imbruglia, Kent, Five, Beth Orton, Avril Lavigne, Jennifer Brown, Howard Donald, Whitney Houston, TLC, Westlife and Death in Vegas. He also returned to the studio to work on producing material for Nan Vernon formerly of The Spiritual Cowboys
