= Robbie France =

British musician (1959-2012)

- Born: 5 December 1959; Sheffield, England
- Died: 14 January 2012 (aged 52) Mazarrón, Spain
- Occupations: Drummer; record producer; arranger; journalist; music educator; broadcaster
- Formerly of: Alphaville; Skunk Anansie; Diamond Head

Robert France (5 December 1959 – 14 January 2012) was an English drummer, record producer, arranger, journalist, music educator, and broadcaster.

== Early life ==
France was born in Sheffield, and emigrated to Australia in March 1972. He studied at the National Academy of Rudimentary Drummers of Australia until 1974, under tutor Harry Lebler. At the age of fifteen, he began to teach at the Australian Academy of Music (1974–1975).

== Career ==
While living and travelling in Australia, France formed the jazz-fusion group, Carnival, performed at the Oz Jazz Festival, and supported John McLaughlin. He worked with Stevie Wright of the Easybeats, Marty Rhone and Tim Gaze. He has over 1,000 television, radio, and advertising credits, including eight documentaries and four film scores, including Band on the Run.

France left Australia in 1982 to return to England, where he joined Diamond Head the following year. Part of the NWOBHM movement, they performed at Castle Donington Monsters of Rock, then went on to record their third album, Canterbury. He played on the hit single "Making Music".

France performed at the first triple headliner drum clinic with Simon Phillips & Steve White, worked with Motown UK's C.E.O., 'Ivan Chandler's All Star Quintet' alongside Andy Hamilton. Also in the quintet were Spike Edney, and Mike Ashley. Playing at various venues around London, including Nick Rhodes' wedding party. In 1984 France toured with UFO, replacing Andy Parker.

Leaving UFO in 1985, he formed One Nation with Kipper (later Sting's producer). They worked together at Tony Visconti's studio in Soho, London on an array of recordings. When France's wife, Annette, was asked to leave One Nation he felt compelled to leave with her. By now France was also teaching in drum clinics, usually on behalf of the Avedis Zildjian cymbal company.

He set up a teaching studio in Kingston upon Thames, where he worked with Gary O'Toole, Hugo Degenhardt, Gary Wallis, Mike + The Mechanics, Power Station, 10cc, Jean Michel Jarre, The Style Council, Gary Ferguson, Mark Price, Tim Burgess, touring through Europe & the UK as support act with Ellis, Beggs & Howard. France had started writing for magazines in Australia, at the age of fifteen. During 1987, he began a monthly column for the British drummer's magazine Rhythm. In 1987, France joined Ellis, Beggs, & Howard (E.B.H.), whose first single, "Big Bubbles No Troubles", won the Diamond Award for best new group.

It was around this time that France was asked to fill in for drummer Frank Tontoh with jazz saxophonist Jean Toussaint. Meeting up to open a venue called The Soho Jazz Shack, Jean asked France to play with him on a more permanent basis, as he (Toussaint) had a regular slot at the Dingwalls club in Camden Town on Sunday afternoons.

After E.B.H., in 1990 France joined Wishbone Ash, with whom he toured and commenced the recording of the album Strange Affair. He then joined Anxious Records' band, Pleasure, touring as support act to the Eurythmics.

In 1991, after working with Simon Ellis (East 17, D:Ream, S Club 7) and others, on the set pieces for his drum clinics, France returned to Australia to form a solo jazz project, The Gab. Based loosely as a tribute to the jazz greats Elvin Jones and John Coltrane, their first album was recorded at EMI Studios 301 in July 1993.

In 1994, he returned to London, ostensibly to promote the solo project where he became a founder member of Skunk Anansie and recorded and co-produced their debut album Paranoid & Sunburnt. He co-wrote the hit track "Weak", which has since been covered by Rod Stewart. He also recorded the B-side, "Army of Me", with Björk.

France left Skunk Anansie in 1995, joining the German group Alphaville the next day. He toured and recorded with Alphaville until an accident in which he severed his Achilles tendon. He lived in Poland for over two years, hosting his own radio programme, and appearing on various television shows. In 1998, he moved to Mazarrón, Spain, to concentrate on writing his first novel. He was running Pulpo Negro Records, Pulpo Negro Publishing, Pulpo Negro Studios, GCBC Productions, with his partner, Tim Oldfield up until 2004. He produced the Spanish bands Second, Renochild, and Blue Aliens Temple, as well as Screw Coco. He also produced, wrote, and arranged for London-based artist Keke.

France broadcast for a number of different radio stations in Spain over the last decade including Costa Calida International and TKO Gold. His most recent preoccupation was a return to radio broadcasting for both Real Radio 95.6 FM in Torrevieja on the Costa Blanca and One Radio Spain on the Costa Calida, providing simulcasts between the two Costas. France's first novel, Six Degrees South was published on 7 December 2011.

== Death ==
France died on 14 January 2012 in Spain after reportedly suffering a ruptured aorta. He was 52.

== As producer and co-producer ==
- Skunk Anansie
- Blue Alien's Temple
- Second
- Keke
- Screw Coco
- Renochild
