= And Why Not? =

British pop group

- Origin: Birmingham, West Midlands, England
- Genres: Pop, reggae
- Years active: 1989–1990
- Members: Wayne Gidden; Michael Steer; Hylton Horatio Hayles

And Why Not? were a British pop trio, from Birmingham, West Midlands, England. Their only album, Move Your Skin (1990) was produced by Alan Shacklock, formerly a guitarist in the rock band Babe Ruth, and engineered by Bryan Smith and Harry Sutcliffe, recorded at Mediasmiths Studio, London, Colney.

== Career ==
And Why Not?'s lead vocalist, Wayne Gidden, was supported with backing vocals from Michael Steer (also on drums, percussion), and Hylton Horatio Hayles (also bass guitar). A fourth member, Peter Morrison, left in the group's early days to pursue other interests.

The group had three top-40 singles on the UK Singles Chart during 1989 and 1990. They played as supporting act to UB40 at the National Exhibition Centre in Birmingham in 1990, and they supported Transvision Vamp at the Hammersmith Odeon in the same year.

== Discography ==
=== Studio albums ===
Title	Album details	Peak positions
Title	Album details	UK
Move Your Skin	Release date: 1990; Label: Island Records; Formats: CD, cassette	24

=== Singles ===
Year	Single	Peak positions	Album
Year	Single	UK	Album
1989	"Restless Days (She Screams Out Loud)" B-side "Hey Na Na (Make It Good)"	38	Move Your Skin
1990	"The Face"	13	Move Your Skin
1990	"Something You Got"	39	Move Your Skin
1990	"The Cage"	89	Move Your Skin
