= The Coffin Train =

Studio album by Diamond Head
- Released: 24 May 2019
- Studio: Vigo Studios, Circle Studios, and Raw Sound Studio
- Genre: Heavy metal
- Length: 50:05
- Label: Silver Lining Music
- Producer: Rasmus Bom Andersen

Diamond Head chronology
Diamond Head (2016)	The Coffin Train (2019)	Lightning to the Nations 2020 (2020)

The Coffin Train is the eighth studio album by British heavy metal band Diamond Head, released on May 24, 2019. Music videos were filmed and produced for the title track, "Belly of the Beast", "The Sleeper", and "Death by Design". “The Coffin Train” music video was produced and animated by All4band Motion & Design Studio under the direction of Maria Goruleva. It was released in a standard jewel case, digipack cd, and a 12" vinyl.

== Background ==
In an interview with Brian Tatler and Rasmus Bom Andersen by Adrian Hextall of MyGlobalMind, on the meaning behind the title, Anderson stated that "The title 'The Coffin Train' came from an image that, in itself, derived from a dream or nightmare that I had, which was sort of a dystopian dream of– imagined this train that’s sort of an old steam train with carriages as coffins, and body parts flying out and sort of racing away from the background and horizon. It’s like a nuclear mushroom cloud, and it’s sort of a very dystopian end of the world kind of thing. I guess it was sort of my subconscious talks to me about how I feel about the current state of the world."

Production on writing new material started at the end of 2016. In January 2017 Tatler and Andersen started work at the latter's home studio, working on ideas, and building on them. Together they co-wrote the lead-off track “Belly of the Beast” from scratch in his studio, which was the last song they had written for the album. They then brought the songs to the band and worked out the arrangements and tempo, and then hit the recording studio. Lyrics were mainly handled by Rasmus Bom Andersen, while the band was still touring through U.S. and Canada; The drums were also edited by him as well on a laptop during the tour. After the tour, they were back in the studio to do bass, guitars, and vocals, which finished up in 2018. Ras did the orchestration at his home, as well as mixing, which took a few months and wasn’t finished until September.

== Critical reception ==
Professional ratings
Review scores
Source	Rating
Blabbermouth	7/10
Metal Injection	4/10
SonicPerspectives	8.4/10 stars
Consequence	B
TheMetalWanderlust	4/5
MoshPitNation	4/5
Sputnikmusic	3.5/5

Reception has been generally positive of the album with critics praising the album as a return to form and continuing the impetus they started with their self-titled Diamond Head back in 2016. A reviewer from TheRockpit stated how "Diamond Head are firing on all cylinders" and that "The Coffin Train hurtles down the tracks destroying everything in its path. The sound is big and booming with a crystal clear production,"; They end their review by stating that "Overall The Coffin Train is a great album with superb guitar work, a tight rhythm section, and vocals that soar like an eagle."

A review from GetReadytoRock was more critical of the record. While they praised much of the material on ‘The Coffin Train’, including the dynamic opener, ‘Belly of the Beast’ and ‘The Messenger’ by stating it's "crunching metal that graduates from the old school with honors." They were harsher to other tracks, saying that "‘The Phoenix’ is a bit much, and the album closer ‘Until We Burn’ has rather more cheese than is good for the digestion." They ended the review with a positive note, saying: "This album will be divisive. For die hards, it will be tough to swallow. It is not NWOBHM and it certainly is not the successor to ‘Lightning…’, but taken in its own right, albeit with enough nods to the roots, this is a fine, well crafted and powerful album. Massive respect to Tatler for sticking to his values and finding a contemporary sound to alloy with his metallic instincts."

Staff reviewer Fernando Alves from Sputnikmusic gave it a positive review, saying how "Except for the debut I never paid much attention to these guys, so The Coffin Train took me by surprise. Unlike many revivals, which only try to emulate the glory days long gone, the band tries in its own way to do something more representative of what they are nowadays, with a much greater focus in the 90s than in their earlier NWOBHM sound signature. Old school fans probably will not like this less heavy, more polished and mainstream approach, I personally find it quite unpretentious and fun."

== Track listing ==
All music is composed by Rasmus Bom Andersen, Brian Tatler, and Karl Wilcox except where noted.

No.	Title	Writer(s)	Length
1.	"Belly of the Beast"		4:34
2.	"The Messenger"		5:16
3.	"The Coffin Train"		6:11
4.	"Shades of Black"	Andersen, Tatler, Dean Ashton, Wilcox	4:40
5.	"The Sleeper (Prelude)"	Andersen, Wilcox	0:59
6.	"The Sleeper"		5:45
7.	"Death by Design"		4:44
8.	"Serrated Love"	Andersen, Tatler, Andy Abberley, Ashton, Wilcox	6:20
9.	"The Phoenix"	Andersen, Abberley, Ashton, Wilcox	5:39
10.	"Until We Burn"		5:57
Total length:			50:05

== Personnel ==
Diamond Head

- Rasmus Bom Andersen – vocals, orchestration
- Brian Tatler – guitar
- Andy "Abbz" Abberley – guitar
- Dean Ashton – bass, backing vocals
- Karl Wilcox – drums

Guest/Session

- Ian Cooke - voiceover (track 5)

Production

- Rasmus Bom Andersen – producer and mixing at Raw Sound Studio
- Trevor Gibson – recording (drums), engineering at Circle studios/Adam Beddow Vigo Studio
- John Davis – mastering at Metropolis studios
- Travis Smith - artwork, layout
- Adam Beddow - recording

== Charts ==
Chart (2019)	Peak position
Belgian Albums (Ultratop Wallonia)	128
Scottish Albums (OCC)	41
Swiss Albums (Schweizer Hitparade)	88
UK Independent Albums (OCC)	18
UK Rock & Metal Albums (OCC)	5
