= Ellis, Beggs & Howard =

English pop band

- Also known as: EBH
- Origin: London, England
- Genres: Pop; dance-pop
- Years active: 1987–1991
- Members: Simon Ellis; Nick Beggs; Austin Howard
- Past members: Paul Harvey; Robbie France

Ellis, Beggs & Howard (EBH) are an English pop music band formed in London in 1987. Its members are Simon Ellis, Nick Beggs and Austin Howard.

== Career ==
Ellis, Beggs & Howard are made up of Simon Ellis (keyboards and programming), Nick Beggs (bass guitar and Chapman stick), and Austin Howard (vocals). They were augmented by Paul Harvey on guitar, Robbie France on drums and Harry Sutcliffe on keyboards and programming. They experimented with several other guitarists, including Marty Williamson, Keith Airey and Sabu Bugaban.

EBH started in late 1987 by playing a few low-key concerts in London. They featured in the NME sponsored shows at The Greyhound in Fulham, and a performance at the nightclub Heaven, and later in bigger arenas.

EBH found success in Europe. Their first single, "Big Bubbles, No Troubles" (produced by Ralph Ruppert and Lux), was a hit in 1988, receiving several awards in many countries. On the UK Singles Chart, the single reached number 41.

From 1989 they recorded the basic tracks of what was to have been their second album with the Fleetwood Mac Mobile, at the Eazee Hire rehearsal complex in London. The album was not released by a label at the time, although Beggs made it available several years later as a home-grown CD release entitled The Lost Years Vol. 1. The album has contributions from Warren Cuccurullo and Robert Fripp.

== Band members ==
=== Main line-up ===
- Simon Ellis – keyboards, programming, backing vocals (1987–1991; 2021—present)
- Nick Beggs – bass guitar, Chapman Stick, backing vocals (1987–1991; 2021—present)
- Austin Howard – lead vocals, percussion (1987–1991; 2021—present)

=== Former members ===
- Paul Harvey – guitar (1987–1990)
- Robbie France – drums (1987–1990)
