= Lars Ulrich =

Danish drummer (born 1963)

Lars Ulrich R
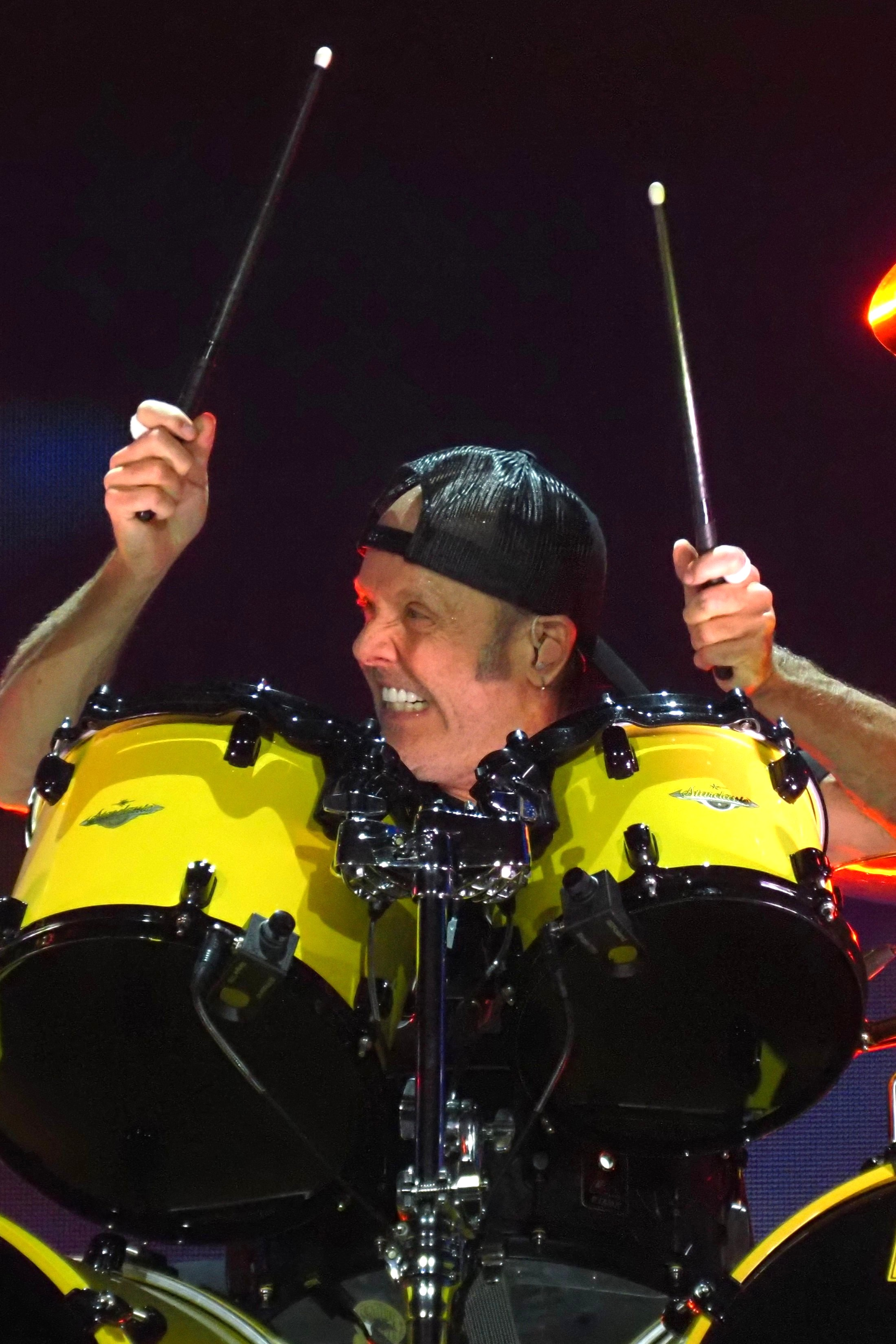
- Ulrich performing with Metallica in 2025

Background information
- Born: 26 December 1963 (age 62); Gentofte, Denmark
- Genres: Thrash metal; heavy metal
- Occupations: Musician; songwriter
- Instrument: Drums
- Years active: 1980–present
- Member of: Metallica
- Spouses: Debbie Jones (m. 1988; div. 1990); Skylar Satenstein (m. 1997; div. 2004); Jessica Miller (m. 2015)
- Partner: Connie Nielsen (2004–2012)
- Children: 3
- Father: Torben Ulrich

Lars Ulrich (/ˈʊlrɪk/; Danish: [ˈlɑːs ˈulˀʁek]; born 26 December 1963) is a Danish (Note: Ulrich has clarified multiple times that he is a Danish citizen who lives in the United States.) musician and songwriter who serves as the drummer and co-founder of American heavy metal band Metallica. Along with James Hetfield, Ulrich has songwriting credits on almost all of the band's songs, and the two of them are the only remaining original members of the band.

The son and grandson respectively of tennis players Torben and Einer Ulrich, he played tennis in his youth and moved to Los Angeles at age 16 to train professionally. However, rather than playing tennis, Ulrich began playing drums. After publishing an advertisement in The Recycler, Ulrich met Hetfield and formed Metallica.

== Early life ==
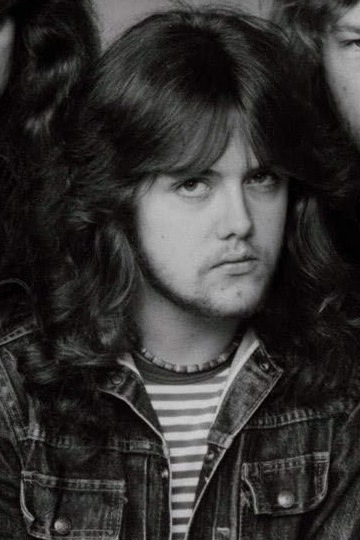
Ulrich in a press photo with Metallica in 1983

Ulrich was born on 26 December 1963 into an upper-middle-class family in Gentofte, Denmark; the son of Lone (née Sylvester-Hvid) and tennis player Torben Ulrich. The family lived at Lundevangsvej 12 in Hellerup. His paternal grandfather was tennis player Einer Ulrich. His paternal grandmother, Ulla Meyer, was from a Jewish family; as a result, Ulrich's grandfather was persecuted by the Nazis during World War II. Saxophonist Dexter Gordon was Ulrich's godfather, and he is a childhood friend of musician Neneh Cherry.

In February 1973, Ulrich's father obtained passes for five of his friends to a Deep Purple concert held in the same Copenhagen stadium as one of his tennis tournaments. When one of the friends could not go, they gave their ticket to the nine-year-old Lars, who was mesmerized by the performance and bought the band's album Fireball the next day. The concert and album had a considerable impact on Ulrich, inspiring the start of his music career.

As a result of his newfound interest in music, he received his first drum kit, a Ludwig, from his grandmother around the age of 12 or 13. Ulrich originally intended to follow in his father's footsteps and play tennis, and he moved to Newport Beach, California, in the summer of 1980. Despite being ranked in the top ten tennis players of his age group in Denmark, Ulrich failed to make it into the seven man Corona del Mar High School tennis team, contributing to his decision to focus on music.

In the documentary Anvil! The Story of Anvil, Ulrich said that attending a Y&T show was his defining moment in wanting to become a musician. In 1981, he discovered British heavy metal band Diamond Head. He was excited about the band's style of music after purchasing their album Lightning to the Nations, and traveled from San Francisco to London to see the band perform at the Woolwich Odeon. Ulrich remains a fan of Diamond Head and would later mix their album The Best of Diamond Head. Upon returning to the U.S., Ulrich placed an advert in a local newspaper looking for musicians to start a band with him. James Hetfield responded, and Metallica was formed.

== Career ==
=== Metallica ===
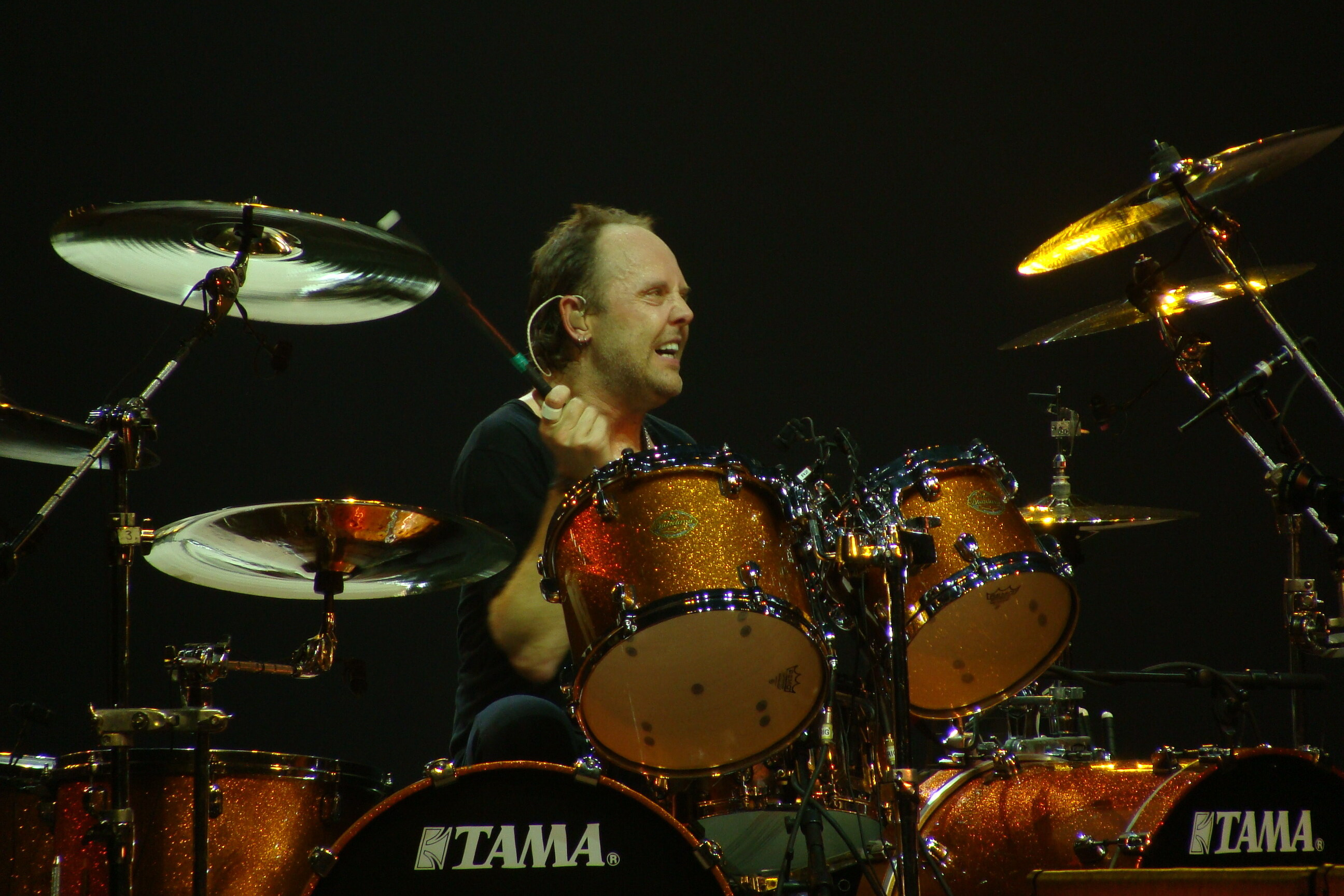
Ulrich performing with Metallica in 2009

Later in 1981, Ulrich met James Hetfield in Downey, California, and they formed the heavy metal band Metallica upon Ulrich securing a spot in a compilation album of local metal bands named Metal Massacre. He got the band name from a friend, Ron Quintana, who was brainstorming names for a heavy metal fanzine he was creating, with Metallica and Metal Mania being among the options; Ulrich encouraged him to choose Metal Mania, and used the name Metallica for himself.

He became known as a pioneer of fast thrash drum beats, featured on many of Metallica's early songs, such as "Metal Militia" from Kill 'Em All, "Fight Fire with Fire" from Ride the Lightning, "Battery" and "Damage Inc." from Master of Puppets and "Dyers Eve" from ...And Justice for All. He has since been considerably influential due to both the popularity of his band, as well as his drum techniques, such as the double bass drum in the song "One" (...And Justice for All) and "Dyers Eve". Since the release of Metallica, Ulrich adopted a less focused and simplified style of drumming, and reduced his kit from a 9-piece to a 7-piece.

Between 1998 and 2002, Ulrich tried running a record label, the Music Company, which was a joint venture with Metallica accountant Tim Duffy. It failed to catch on and folded in 2002. His voice can be heard at the beginning of "Leper Messiah" and he also counts to four in his native Danish in the "St. Anger" music video.

=== Napster lawsuit ===
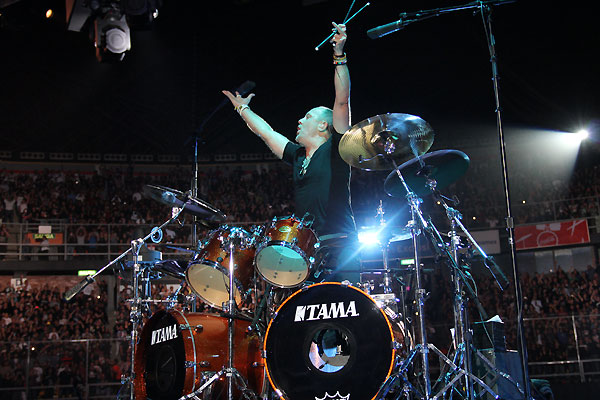
Ulrich performing with Metallica in 2012

In April 2000, Ulrich became a vocal opponent of Napster and file sharing as Metallica filed a lawsuit against the company for copyright infringement and racketeering. In July 2000, he testified before the Senate Judiciary Committee after Metallica's entire catalogue, including the then-unfinished track "I Disappear" was found to be freely available for download on the service. The case was settled out-of-court, resulting in more than 300,000 Napster users being banned from the service.

== Other activities ==
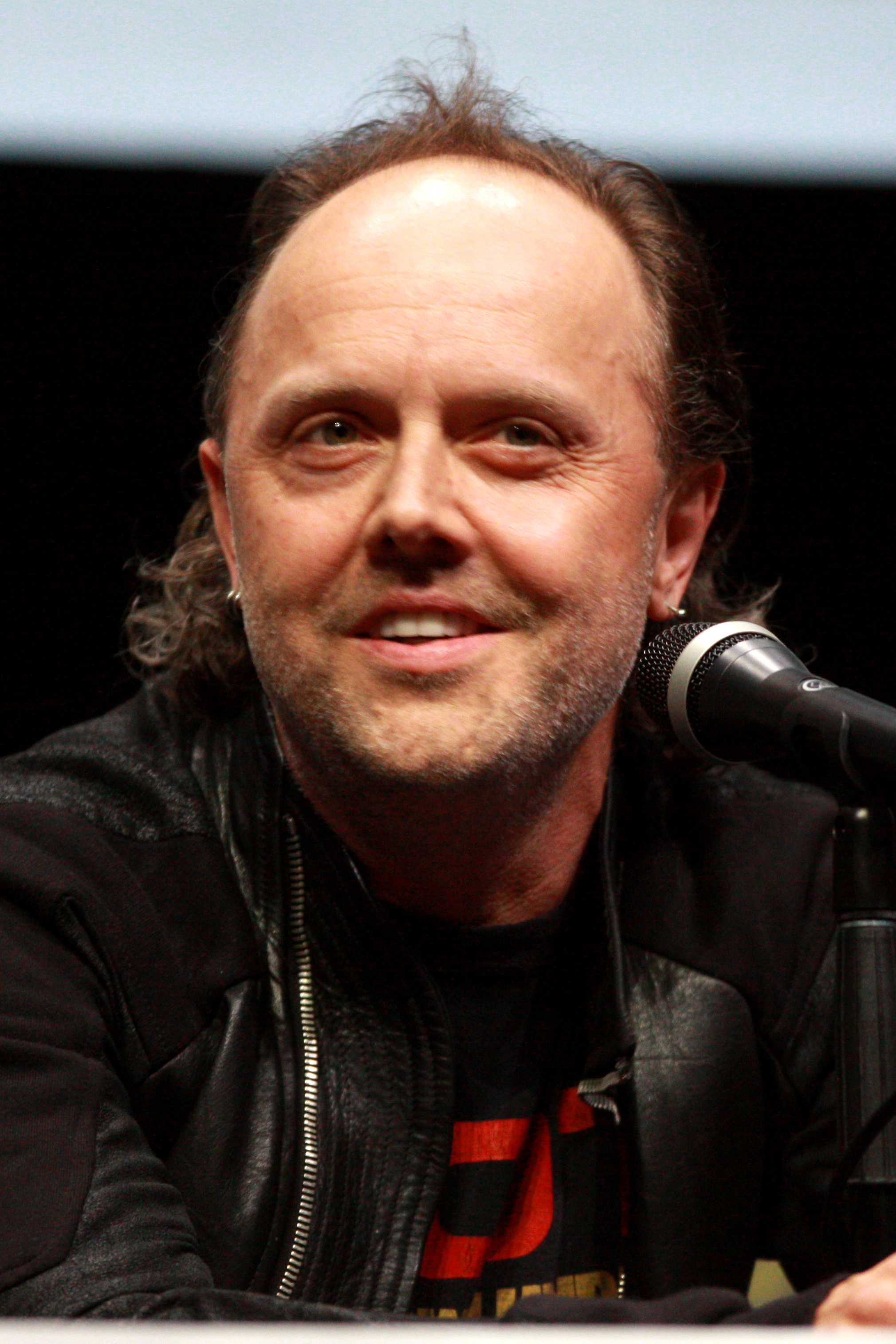
Ulrich at the 2013 San Diego Comic-Con

Ulrich has been an activist in support of expanding access to health care for U.S. citizens, with his family working with the Haight Ashbury Free Clinic of San Francisco, California. He raised $32,000 for the group during a celebrity edition of the game show Who Wants to Be a Millionaire?.

Ulrich made his acting debut in the HBO original film Hemingway & Gellhorn, which began filming in March 2011 and was released on 28 May 2012. He made a brief cameo appearance as himself in the film Get Him to the Greek, as the partner of the character Jackie Q. In 2012, Ulrich was the focus of the documentary film Mission to Lars. The film by Kate and Will Spicer concerns their journey with their brother Tom, who lives in a care home in Devon, England and who has Fragile X syndrome, to try to meet Ulrich at one of Metallica's 2009 gigs in California.

Having led a campaign for several years to get his longtime favorite band, Deep Purple, inducted into the Rock and Roll Hall of Fame, Ulrich delivered the induction speech when the band went into the Hall in 2016. In 2017, Ulrich began hosting a show on Apple Music called It's Electric, which has featured conversations with Joan Jett, Noel Gallagher, Dave Grohl and Jerry Cantrell.

== Artistry ==
=== Playing style ===
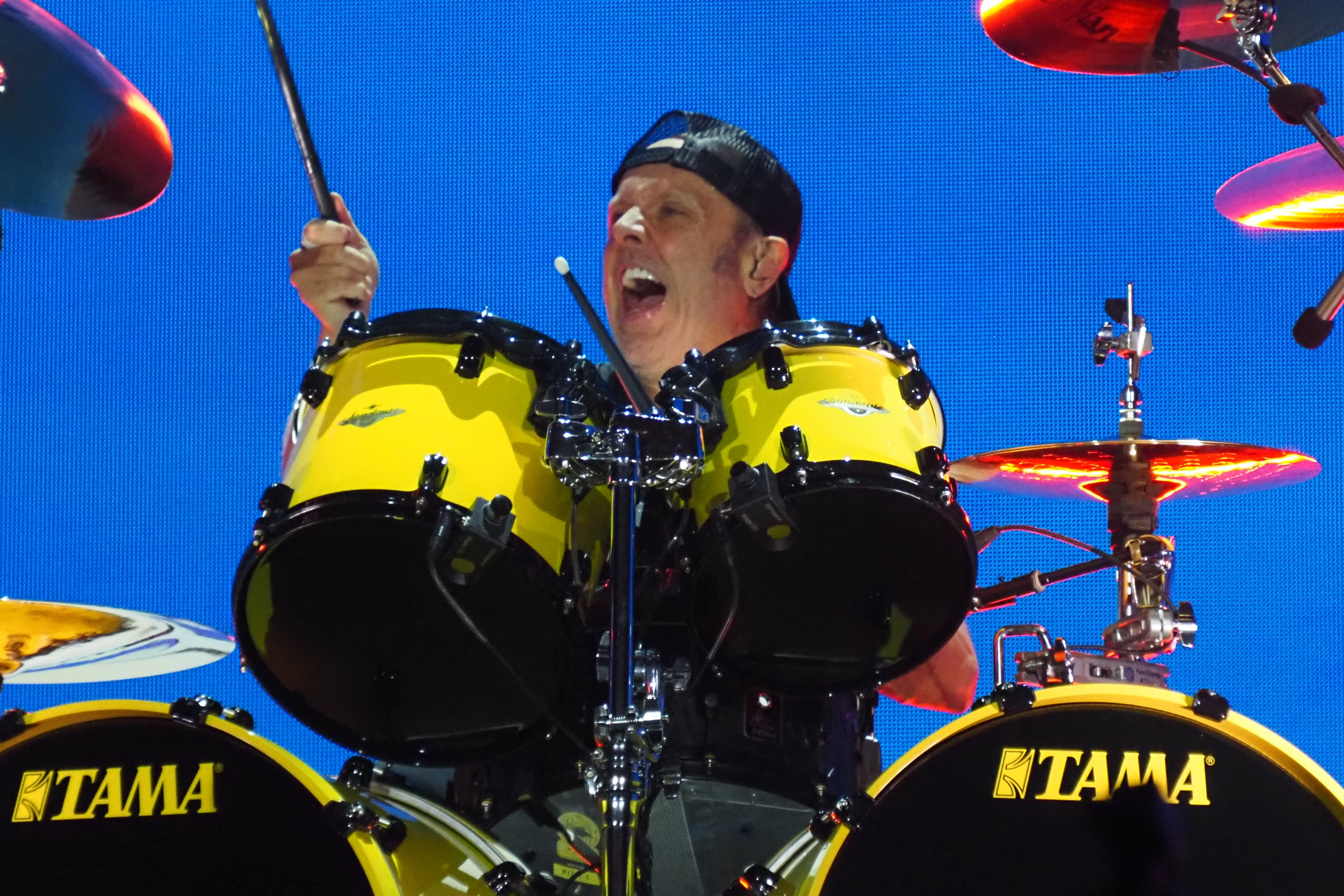
Ulrich performing with Metallica in 2025

Ulrich's drumming style has changed throughout his career. During the 1980s, he was known for his fast, aggressive thrash beats. Unlike most drummers, Ulrich does not use a ride cymbal in his kit and instead favors using a China cymbal. He said that he does not like the "ding" sound of the former and prefers the loudness of the latter. Although, during some live performances on the M72 World Tour (particularly for "Until It Sleeps"), his drum tech places a ride cymbal next to his China cymbal, and removes it before the next song.

Ulrich consciously simplified his style in the 1990s to support the hard rock-oriented songwriting of Metallica's albums during that period. He returned to a thrash style for some of the band's later albums, including Death Magnetic (2008) and Hardwired... to Self-Destruct (2016).

=== Equipment ===
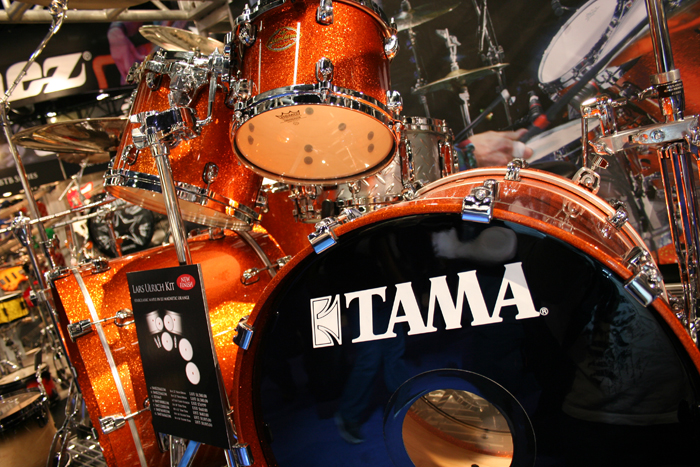
One of Ulrich's signature Tama drum kits

Ulrich endorses Tama drums and hardware. He plays a Starclassic Maple series drum kit, with 10" and 12" rack toms, two 16" floor toms and two 22" bass drums. From 2008 to 2016 he used the kit in orange, and the WorldWired Tour featured the similar kit with a Deeper Purple finish. During the M72 World Tour, the kit is bright yellow with black hardware. With Tama, Ulrich has designed his signature 14×6.5" steel snare drum, model LU1465. Ulrich also endorses Zildjian cymbals, Remo drumheads, and Ahead drumsticks.

== Personal life ==
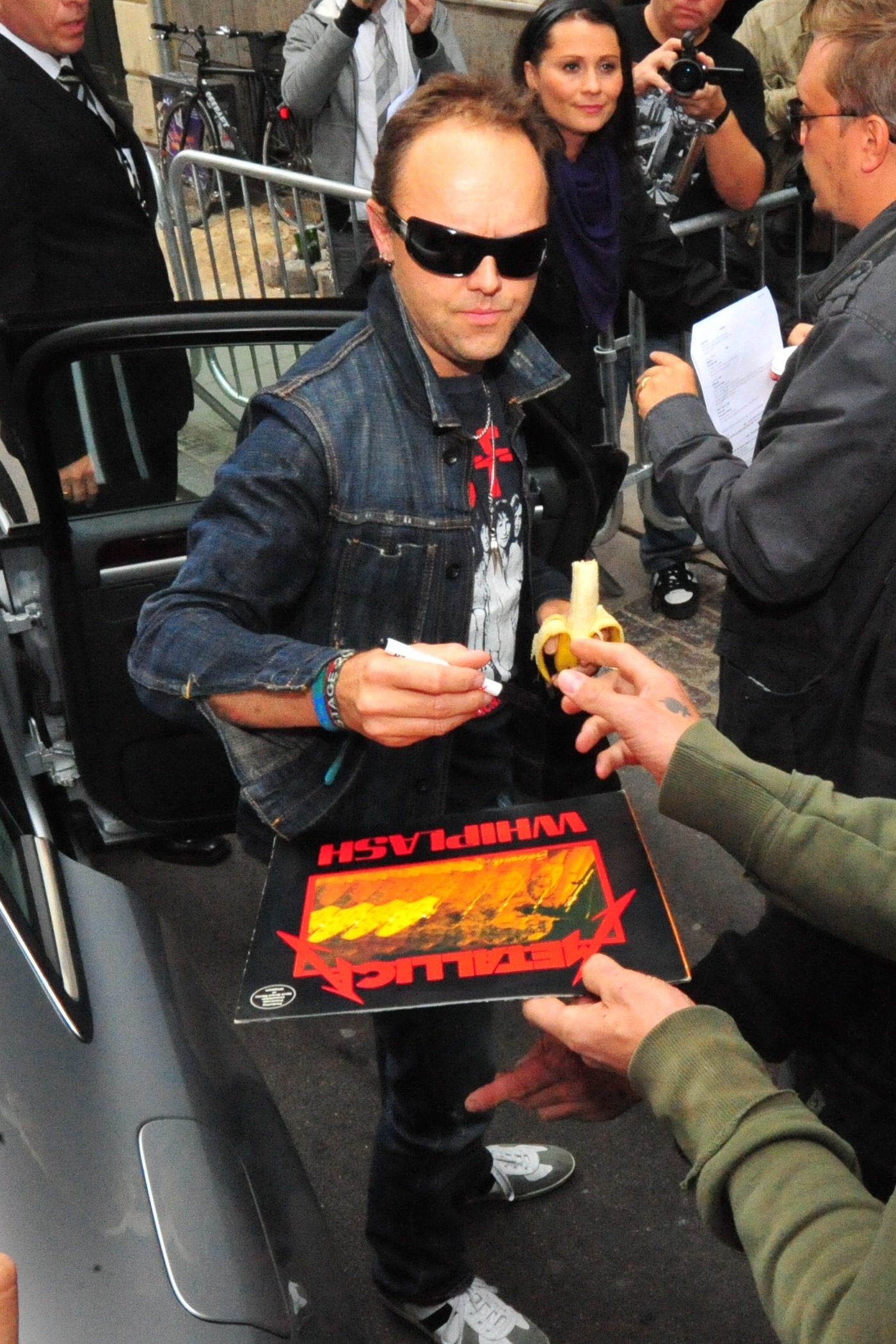
Ulrich in 2008

Ulrich's first marriage was in 1988 to Debbie Jones, a British woman he met on tour, but they divorced in 1990 during the recordings of Metallica. His second marriage was to Skylar Satenstein, an emergency medicine physician, from 1997 to 2004. They had two sons before divorcing. Following his divorce from Satenstein, Ulrich dated Danish actress Connie Nielsen from 2004 to 2012. They had one child together. He married American fashion model Jessica Miller in 2015. Ulrich's sons Myles and Layne play in a band named Taipei Houston, which released its debut album in 2022.

Ulrich resides in San Francisco, California, but only has Danish citizenship. Ulrich is a friend of Noel Gallagher and his band Oasis and claimed Gallagher was his inspiration to give up cocaine in the 2000s. He also has a passion for fine art. In 2002, he sold a painting from his own collection, Self Portrait by Jean-Michel Basquiat, 1982. With a pre-sale price estimate of $5 million, it ultimately sold for triple that at Christie's Auction House. In 2009, Ulrich revealed he suffered from tinnitus due to many years of touring without the use of any auditory protection. To unwind after some gigs, Ulrich listens to jazz.

== Awards and honors ==
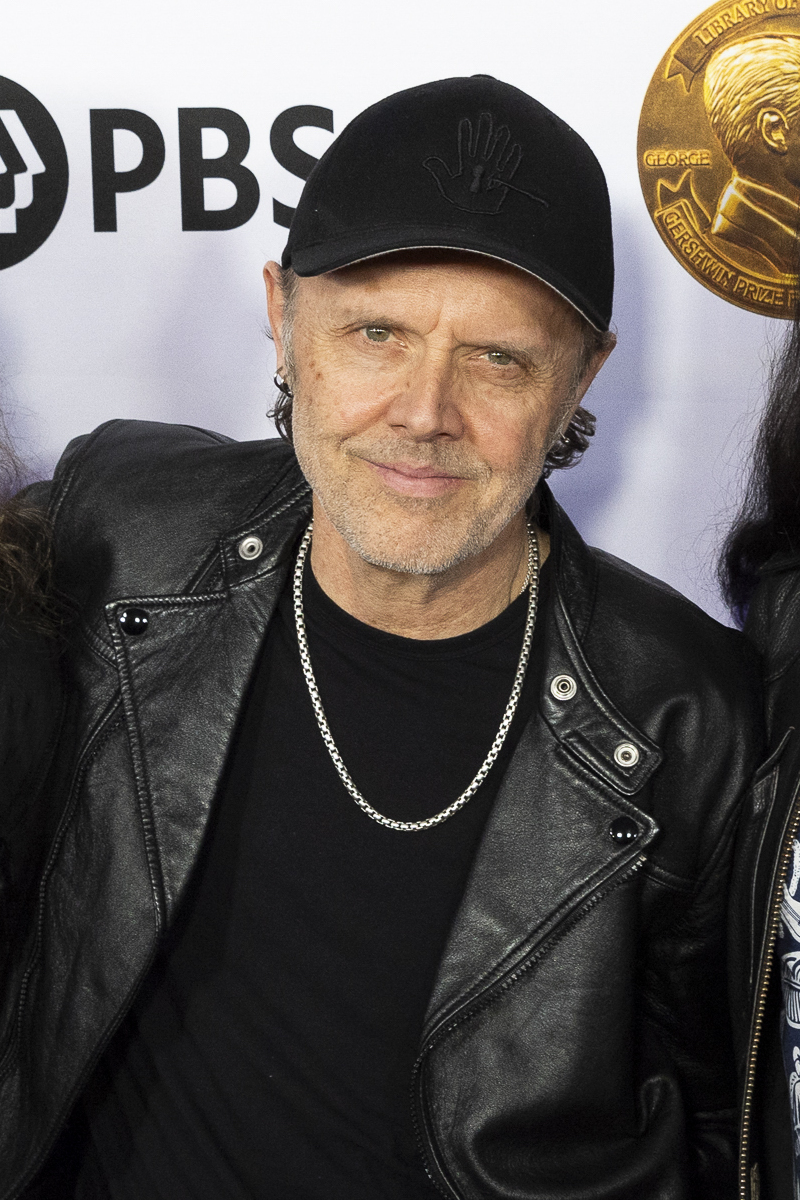
Ulrich at the 2024 Gershwin Prize ceremony

When Ulrich and other current and former Metallica members were inducted into the Rock and Roll Hall of Fame in 2009, Ulrich was the first Dane to receive the honor.

Ulrich was knighted in his native country of Denmark. He was awarded the Knight's Cross of the Order of the Dannebrog on 26 May 2017 by Margrethe II.

== Discography ==
=== Metallica ===
- Kill 'Em All (1983)
- Ride the Lightning (1984)
- Master of Puppets (1986)
- ...And Justice for All (1988)
- Metallica (1991)
- Load (1996)
- Reload (1997)
- St. Anger (2003)
- Death Magnetic (2008)
- Hardwired... to Self-Destruct (2016)
- 72 Seasons (2023)

=== Guest appearances ===
- Mercyful Fate – In the Shadows (guest on the bonus track "Return of the Vampire ... 1993")
- Ludwig Görannson - Sinners (Original Motion Picture Score) (guest on the song “Bury That Guitar”)

== Filmography ==
Year	Title	Role	Notes
1998–2001	Behind the Music	Himself	2 episodes
2004	Metallica: Some Kind of Monster	Himself	Documentary
2004	Dave the Barbarian	Jett (voice)	Animated series
2010	Get Him to the Greek	Himself	
2012	Hemingway & Gellhorn	Joris Ivens	HBO original film
2012	Mission to Lars	Himself	Documentary film
2013	Behind The Music: Remastered	Himself	2 episodes
2013	Metallica: Through the Never	Himself	
2016	Radio Dreams	Himself	
2025	Spinal Tap II: The End Continues	Himself	
