= All Will Be Revealed =

Studio album by Diamond Head
- Released: 31 October 2005
- Genre: Heavy metal
- Length: 46:57
- Label: Cargo Records
- Producers: Brian Tatler and Karl Wilcox

Diamond Head chronology
Evil Live (1994)	All Will Be Revealed (2005)	What's in Your Head? (2007)

Professional ratings
Review scores
Source	Rating
AllMusic	3/5 stars

All Will Be Revealed is the fifth album by British heavy metal band Diamond Head. This was Diamond Head's first album with new singer Nick Tart and also the only album to feature Adrian Mills on guitar, who was replaced by Andy 'Abbz' Abberley during the second leg of this tour - his first show at The Shed in Leicester, England in May 2006. This album was the band's first release since their 2002 Acoustic First Cuts EP and the first studio album since 1993's Death and Progress.

The album was recorded in 2004 and first released as a Limited 2005 Tour Edition for the band's European tour supporting Megadeth with the cover artwork depicting a solar eclipse. A second issue of the album was released in February 2005 by Diamond Head (Music) Ltd., which featured an interview with Megadeth's Dave Mustaine and a different cover of only the Diamond Head logo designed by Mick Payton. It was then released again by Cargo Records in October 2005. Lead guitarist, Brian Tatler has stated that the aim of this record was just to try to release a solid rock album with "punchy" riffs and no fillers.

The songs on this album cover a variety of topics from break-ups and divorce (Mine All Mine and Alimony) to alcoholism (Drinking Again). The album seems to tell the tale of a man who is over protective of his wife causing her to lose interest in him and ending the relationship, leaving him down and out and turning to drink. However, the band say this is just a coincidence and the songs were set out in order preference, starting with what they thought was the strongest song and ending in the weakest.

== Track listing ==
All tracks are written by Brian Tatler and Nick Tart, except where noted.

No.	Title	Length
1.	"Mine All Mine"	4:06
2.	"Give It to Me"	3:05
3.	"Nightmare"	3:42
4.	"Fallen Angel"	4:10
5.	"Alimony" (Tatler, Tart, Karl Wilcox)	3:14
6.	"Lost at Sea"	3:59
7.	"Broken Pieces"	4:54
8.	"All Will Be Revealed"	4:00
9.	"Dead or Living" (Tatler, Tart, Wilcox)	4:31
10.	"Drinkin' Again" (Tatler, Tart, Wilcox)	1:52
11.	"Come Alive" (Tatler, Tart, Duncan Scott)	4:49
12.	"Muddy Waters"	4:35
Total length:		46:57

== Personnel ==
- Brian Tatler – guitar
- Nick Tart – vocals
- Karl Wilcox – drums
- Eddie Moohan – bass
- Adrian Mills – guitar
