= Diamond Head (Diamond Head album) =

Studio album by Diamond Head
- Released: 22 April 2016
- Recorded: 2015
- Studio: Vigo
- Genre: Heavy metal
- Length: 48:21
- Label: Dissonance Productions
- Producer: Diamond Head

Diamond Head chronology
What's in Your Head? (2007)	Diamond Head (2016)	The Coffin Train (2019)

Professional ratings
Review scores
Source	Rating
Metal Hammer	3.5/5 stars
BW&BK	8.0/10
Rock Hard	8.5/10

Diamond Head is the seventh studio album by British heavy metal band Diamond Head, released on 22 April 2016. This is the first album from the band to feature Rasmus Bom Andersen as the lead vocalist. The album reached number 15 on the UK Rock & Metal Albums Chart.

== Track listing ==
No.	Title	Length
1.	"Bones"	4:12
2.	"Shout at the Devil"	4:04
3.	"Set My Soul on Fire"	4:24
4.	"See You Rise"	4:16
5.	"All the Reasons You Live"	5:23
6.	"Wizard Sleeve"	3:18
7.	"Our Time Is Now"	4:27
8.	"Speed"	4:07
9.	"Blood on My Hands"	4:24
10.	"Diamonds"	3:24
11.	"Silence"	6:22
Total length:		48:27

Japanese edition bonus tracks
No.	Title	Length
12.	"Kings & Queens"	5:22
13.	"All the Reasons You Live (Orchestral Mix)"	5:24
Total length:		59:13

== Personnel ==
Personnel taken from Diamond Head liner notes.

Diamond Head

- Rasmus Bom Andersen – vocals, orchestration
- Brian Tatler – lead and rhythm guitar
- Andy "Abbz" Abberley – rhythm and lead guitar
- Eddie "Chaos" Moohan – bass
- Karl Wilcox – drums

Additional personnel

- Diamond Head – production
- Adam Beddow – recording, mixing
- Dave "Shirt" Nicholls – mixing
- John Davis – mastering
- David A. Gardiner – album artwork

== Charts ==
Chart (2016)	Peak position
UK Independent Albums (Official Charts)	33
UK Rock & Metal Albums (Official Charts)	15
