= Waited Too Long/Play It Loud =

Single by Diamond Head
- Released: 1981
- Label: DHM Records
- Producer: Tony Wilson

Diamond Head singles chronology
"Sweet and Innocent" (1980)	"Waited Too Long/Play It Loud" (1981)	"Call Me" (1982)

"Waited Too Long"/"Play It Loud" is a single by British heavy metal band Diamond Head, released in 1981 via DHM Records. It was a double A-side with "Waited Too long" and "Play It Loud". Both tracks eventually ended up on the re-released version of Diamond Head's 1980 debut Lightning to the Nations in 2001 by Sanctuary Records.

== Track listing ==
1. "Waited Too Long"
2. "Play It Loud"

== Lineup ==
- Brian Tatler
- Sean Harris
- Duncan Scott
- Colin Kimberley

== Charts ==
Chart (1987)	Peak position
UK Indie Chart	49
