= Restless Days (song) =

"Restless days (She Screams Out Loud)"

Single by And Why Not?
- Genre: Pop music
- Label: Island

Restless days (she screams out loud) was a single by UK male vocal and instrumental band And Why Not?. It entered the UK Singles Chart on 14 October 1989. It reached a peak position of number 38, and remained in the chart for 7 weeks.

Wayne Gidden sang and played guitar, Hylton Hayles played the bass, and Michael Steer was the drummer.
