= Death and Progress =

Studio album by Diamond Head
- Released: 14 June 1993
- Studios: Music Station, Birmingham and Parkgate Studios, Battle, East Sussex, UK
- Genre: Heavy metal
- Length: 39:43
- Label: Castle Music
- Producers: Diamond Head, Andrew Scarth, Dave Mustaine, Max Norman

Diamond Head chronology
Canterbury (1983)	Death and Progress (1993)	Evil Live (1994)

Professional ratings
Review scores
Source	Rating
AllMusic	4/5 stars

Death and Progress is the fourth studio album by British heavy metal band Diamond Head, released in 1993 through Castle Music.

This was Diamond Head's first album since Canterbury, released 10 years earlier. It was co-produced, engineered and mixed by Andrew Scarth, who had previously worked for bands such as Bad Company and Foreigner. The album had a much cleaner and more polished sound than their previous three albums and featured two special guests, Tony Iommi, of Black Sabbath, and Dave Mustaine, of Megadeth, the latter also enlisting the help of his own producer Max Norman.

== National Bowl incident ==
The reunion of Diamond Head did not last. One major contributor to the second fall of the band was during the Death and Progress tour, when Diamond Head opened for Metallica and Megadeth at the National Bowl in Milton Keynes on 5 June 1993; The Almighty was also on the bill.

During the show, Sean Harris came out dressed as the Grim Reaper, which Brian Tatler reported in the British rock magazine Classic Rock was Harris' way of saying that the new wave of British heavy metal was over. They opened with their flagship song, "Am I Evil?", and ended with "Helpless", both off their 1980 debut Lightning to the Nations, as they thought this would go down well with the Metallica fan base. However, Diamond Head had not been around for the majority of the previous decade and Metallica had covered both of these songs ("Am I Evil?" was the B-side to "Creeping Death" and "Helpless" appeared on The $5.98 E.P. – Garage Days Re-Revisited), meaning much of the crowd believed that Diamond Head were covering Metallica songs.

In addition, their performance was considered abysmal, due to the pressure of playing live on MTV, and the fact that Tatler had shingles at the time and that Diamond Head had almost no rehearsal time prior to the gig.

Following the show, the band split up again and would not reform until 2000.

== Track listing ==
All tracks are written by Sean Harris and Brian Tatler, except where noted.

No.	Title	Writer(s)	Length
1.	"Starcrossed (Lovers of the Night)"	Harris, Tatler, Tony Iommi	4:27
2.	"Truckin'"		3:05
3.	"Calling Your Name (The Light)"		4:06
4.	"I Can't Help Myself"		3:37
5.	"Paradise"		3:36
6.	"Dust"		4:18
7.	"Run"		4:43
8.	"Wild on the Streets"		3:46
9.	"Damnation Street"		3:17
10.	"Home"		4:42

=== Notes ===
- The tracks Wild on the Streets and I Can't Help Myself were previously released on the EP Rising Up, although it was only sold at gigs and specialist music stores.

== Personnel ==
=== Diamond Head ===
- Sean Harris – vocals
- Brian Tatler – guitars
- Pete Vuckovic – bass, backing vocals
- Karl Wilcox – drums

=== Additional personnel ===
- Tony Iommi – additional guitars (including outro solo) on "Starcrossed (Lovers of the Night)"
- Dave Mustaine – additional guitars, producer and mixing on "Truckin'"
- Eddie Moohan – bass on "I Can't Help Myself" and "Wild on the Streets"

=== Production ===
- Andrew Scarth – producer, engineer, mixing
- Brad Davis – engineer on tracks 1 and 9
- Max Norman – producer and engineer on track 2
- Mark Dearnley, Simon Efemey – engineers on tracks 4 and 8
- Rafe McKenna – mixing on tracks 1 and 5

== External sites ==
- "The History of Diamond Head". diamond-head.net. Archived from the original on 13 August 2006.
- "Death and Progress promo video". YouTube.
- "Official video for "Truckin'". YouTube.
