= Canterbury (album) =

Studio album by Diamond Head
- Released: 16 September 1983
- Recorded: 1983
- Genres: Progressive rock, art rock, hard rock, heavy metal
- Length: 40:34
- Label: MCA
- Producers: Mike Shipley & Diamond Head

Diamond Head chronology
Borrowed Time (1982)	Canterbury (1983)	Behold the Beginning (1986)

Professional ratings
Review scores
Source	Rating
AllMusic	2/5 stars
Classic Rock	3.5/5 stars
The Collector's Guide to Heavy Metal	8/10

Canterbury is the third studio album by British heavy metal band Diamond Head. It was recorded and released in 1983, reaching number 32 on the UK Albums Chart. The progressive rock sound, which was only hinted at on Borrowed Time, is much more prominent here.

== Background ==
This album was originally entitled Making Music (after the first track on the album) but later became Canterbury. The success of this album was initially stalled by the fact that the first 20,000 copies suffered vinyl-pressing problems, causing the LP to jump. In addition, this album was an attempt by the band to show that they could write more than just heavy metal songs. However, many fans wanted a heavier follow up to the previous record, Borrowed Time and did not like the progressive direction.

There were two singles to be released from this album, which were "Makin' Music" (that had an extended version and an interview with Andy Peebles, now available on the released version of the album) and "Out of Phase", which had "The Kingmaker" as its B-side. "Out of Phase" was also released as a B-side for a live version of "Sucking My Love".

The song "Knight of the Swords" is about the god Arioch in Michael Moorcock's Elric stories.

This album was only released on CD in Japan making it a highly collectible item. On 15 October 2007 it was released by Metal Mind Productions on CD format, with bonus tracks. However, this was limited to 2000 copies. The album was made widely available in 2009, along with Borrowed Time, as part of the boxset The MCA Years.

== Track listing ==
All tracks are written by Sean Harris and Brian Tatler.

Side one
No.	Title	Length
1.	"Makin' Music"	3:51
2.	"Out of Phase"	3:32
3.	"The Kingmaker"	4:12
4.	"One More Night"	4:11
5.	"To the Devil His Due"	6:02

Side two
No.	Title	Length
6.	"Knight of the Swords"	6:53
7.	"Ishmael"	4:01
8.	"I Need Your Love"	3:03
9.	"Canterbury"	4:58

2007 CD reissue bonus tracks
No.	Title	Length
10.	"Makin' Music" (extended 12" version)	6:08
11.	"Sucking My Love" (live)	9:08
12.	"Andy Peebles interview" (including To the Devil His Due)	15:58

The MCA Years bonus tracks
No.	Title	Length
10.	"Makin' Music" (extended 12" version)	6:08
11.	"Can't Take No More" (previously unreleased demo)	3:29
12.	"Time's on My Side" (previously unreleased demo)	3:59
13.	"Come to Hear You Play" (previously unreleased demo)	4:07

== Personnel ==
=== Diamond Head ===
- Sean Harris – vocals
- Brian Tatler – guitars
- Colin Kimberley, Mervyn Goldsworthy – bass
- Duncan Scott, Robbie France – drums

=== Additional musicians ===
- Jamie Lane – drums
- Chris Heaton – keyboards and fairlight
- The Jolly Slaves – backing vocals

=== Production ===
- Mike Shipley – producer, engineer
- Bryan 'Chuck' New – assistant engineer

== Charts ==
Chart (1983)	Peak position
UK Albums (Official Charts)	32
