= Shoot Out the Lights (song) =

1980 single by Diamond Head

Single by Diamond Head
- Released: 7 March 1980
- Genre: Heavy metal
- Label: Happy Face Records

Diamond Head singles chronology
"Shoot Out the Lights" (1980)	"Sweet and Innocent" (1980)

"Shoot Out the Lights" is the debut single by British heavy metal band Diamond Head released in March 1980 by Happy Face Records, the band's own label, with "Helpless" as the B-side, and was only available on 7", without a picture sleeve in order to reduce production costs.

An extended version of "Helpless" appeared on Diamond Head's 1980 debut Lightning to the Nations, and "Shoot Out the Lights" eventually appeared on an expanded version of the debut album released in 2001 by Sanctuary Records.

The single received much criticism from heavy metal fans claiming that "it wasn't metal enough". The band, though scoffing at these comments, was seen in live concerts playing more hardcore versions of the songs.

"Helpless" was covered by heavy metal band Metallica on their 1987 The $5.98 E.P. – Garage Days Re-Revisited EP.

== Track listing ==
1. "Shoot Out the Lights" - 4:10
2. "Helpless" - 4:05

== Lineup ==
- Brian Tatler
- Sean Harris
- Duncan Scott
- Colin Kimberley

== Charts ==
Chart (1980)	Peak position
UK Indie Chart	14
