= Sweet and Innocent (Diamond Head song) =

Single by Diamond Head
- Released: 1980
- Genre: Heavy metal
- Label: Media Records
- Songwriters: Brian Tatler, Sean Harris
- Producer: Robin (Boy) George

Diamond Head singles chronology
"Shoot Out the Lights" (1979)	"Sweet and Innocent" (1980)	"Waited Too Long/Play It Loud" (1981)

"Sweet and Innocent" is a single by British heavy metal band Diamond Head, released in 1980 by Media Records, a Wolverhampton-based label. It was a single A-side "Streets of Gold" as the B-Side, and was only available on 7". Both tracks eventually ended up on the re-released version of Diamond Head's 1980 debut Lightning to the Nations in 2001 by Sanctuary Records.

== Track listing ==
1. "Sweet and Innocent"
2. "Streets of Gold"

== Lineup ==
- Brian Tatler
- Sean Harris
- Duncan Scott
- Colin Kimberley

== Charts ==
Chart (1980)	Peak position
UK Indie Chart	39
