= Borrowed Time (Diamond Head album) =

- Cover art by Rodney Matthews

Studio album by Diamond Head
- Released: 15 October 1982
- Studio: Playground (London)
- Genre: Heavy metal
- Length: 42:10
- Label: MCA
- Producers: Mike Hedges; Diamond Head

Diamond Head chronology
Lightning to the Nations (1980)	Borrowed Time (1982)	Canterbury (1983)

Borrowed Time is the second studio album by British heavy metal band Diamond Head, released on 15 October 1982 through MCA Records. The album entered and peaked at No. 24 on 23 October 1982 on the UK Albums Chart.

In a 2008 interview, guitarist Brian Tatler said that this was his favourite period with Diamond Head and that the band "seemed to be getting somewhere after six years of building".

== Background ==
This was the band's first major label release after being signed to MCA Records in 1981. As this was their first album under a major label, the album was much cleaner and better produced. However, some say that MCA was the wrong label for Diamond Head, which is one of the contributions to their downfall. Some have also questioned the necessity for "Am I Evil?" and "Lightning to the Nations" to be included on the album, since they had already appeared on the band's debut album, Lightning to the Nations (1980).

Originally, Borrowed Time was only released on CD in Japan, making it a highly collectible item. Although on 15 October 2008, it was released by Metal Mind Productions on CD format, with bonus tracks. However, this was limited to 2,000 copies. The release contains B-sides, such as "Dead Reckoning", which were previously unavailable on CD. However, Geffen Records have now issued the album on general release. The cover features a Rodney Matthews illustrated gatefold sleeve, based on the album's Elric of Melniboné theme.

== Reception ==
Professional ratings
Review scores
Source	Rating
AllMusic	2/5 stars
Collector's Guide to Heavy Metal	10/10

The album managed to get to No. 24 on the UK album charts, becoming the band's first and only album to chart. The band went on to perform a full scale UK arena tour, performing large venues such as London's Hammersmith Apollo.

== Track listing ==
All tracks are written by Sean Harris and Brian Tatler.

Side one
No.	Title	Length
1.	"In the Heat of the Night"	4:57
2.	"To Heaven from Hell"	6:14
3.	"Call Me"	3:54
4.	"Lightning to the Nations"	4:09

Side two
No.	Title	Length
5.	"Borrowed Time"	7:39
6.	"Don't You Ever Leave Me"	7:56
7.	"Am I Evil? (Re-recorded)"	7:21

2008 CD reissue bonus tracks
No.	Title	Length
8.	"Trick or Treat" (from the Four Cuts EP)	3:30
9.	"Dead Reckoning" (from the Four Cuts EP)	3:31
10.	"Shoot Out the Lights" (from the Four Cuts EP)	3:23
11.	"In the Heat of the Night" (from the In the Heat of the Night EP)	3:20
12.	"Play It Loud (Live)" (from the In the Heat of the Night EP)	6:12
13.	"Sweet and Innocent (Live)" (from the In the Heat of the Night EP)	3:33
14.	"Interview with Sean Harris and Colin Kimberley by Tommy Vance" (from the In the Heat of the Night EP)	13:38

The MCA Years bonus tracks
No.	Title	Length
8.	"Borrowed Time" (BBC Radio 1 session)	6:54
9.	"Don't You Ever Leave Me" (BBC Radio 1 session)	5:46
10.	"Sweet and Innocent" (BBC Radio 1 session)	3:29
11.	"Lightning to the Nations" (BBC Radio 1 session)	4:19
12.	"Dead Reckoning"	3:34
13.	"Trick or Treat"	3:30
14.	"Shoot Out the Lights"	3:22

== Personnel ==
Per the liner notes.

Diamond Head

- Sean Harris – lead vocals, backing vocals, percussion, vocoder
- Brian Tatler – guitars, backing vocals
- Colin Kimberley – bass, Taurus bass pedals, backing vocals
- Duncan Scott – drums, percussion

Additional personnel

- Mike Hedges – production, engineering, pre-production engineering
- Diamond Head – production
- Leo Peppas – engineering
- Sean Harris – sleeve concept
- Rodney Matthews – illustrations
- Simon Fowler – photographs
- Cream – artwork

== Charts ==
Chart (1982)	Peak position
UK Albums (Official Charts)	24
