= Diamond Head (British band) =

British heavy metal band

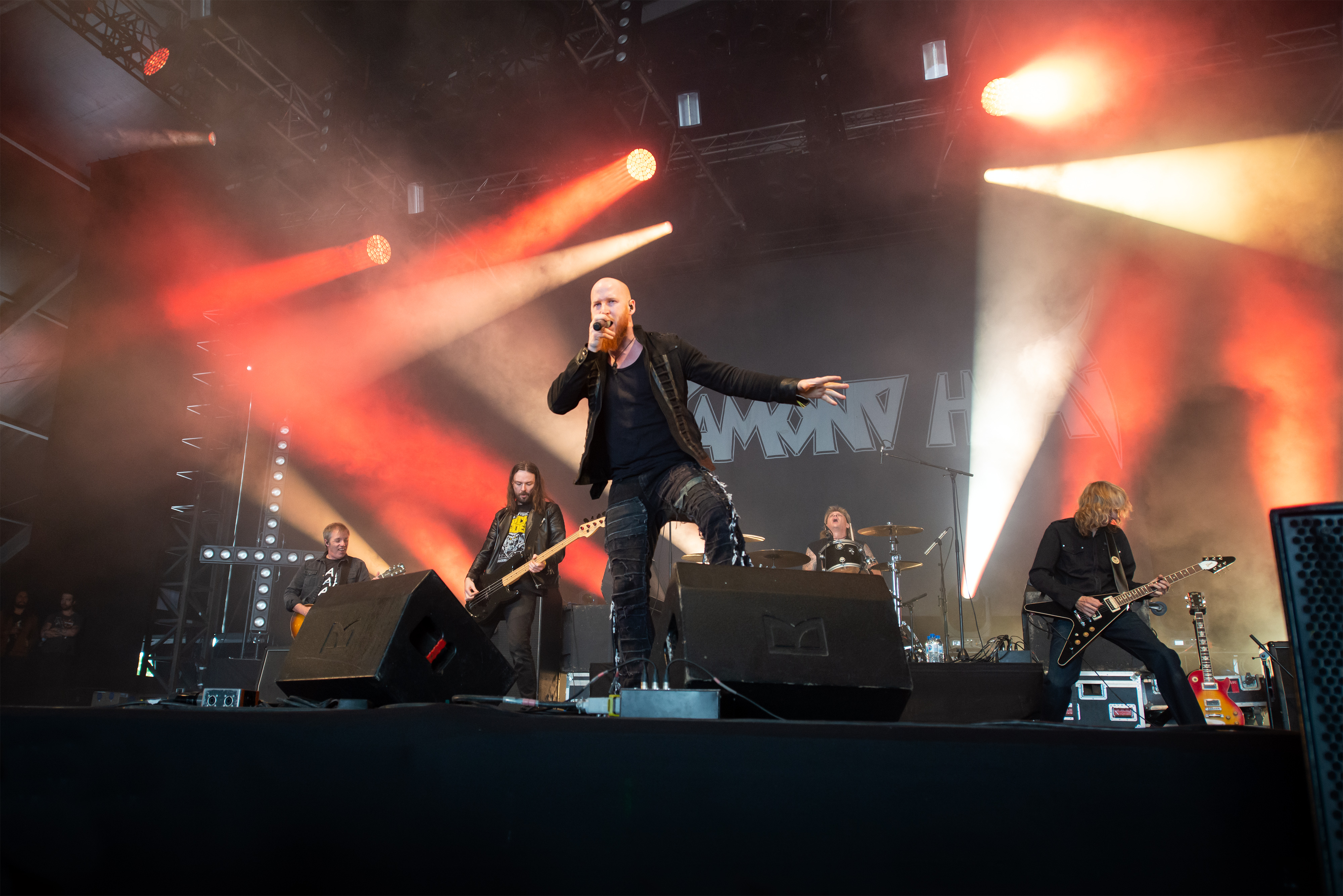
- Diamond Head performing in 2019

Background information
- Origin: Stourbridge, England
- Genre: Heavy metal
- Years active: 1976–1985; 1991–1994; 2000–present (on hiatus since 2025)
- Members: Brian Tatler; Karl Wilcox; Rasmus Bom Andersen; Andy Abberley; Paul Gaskin
- Past members: Sean Harris; Duncan Scott; Colin Kimberley; Robbie France; Josh Phillips-Gorse; Mervyn Goldsworthy; Dave Williamson; Pete Vuckovic; Floyd Brennan; Adrian Mills; Nick Tart; Eddie Moohan; Dean Ashton

Diamond Head are an English heavy metal band formed in Stourbridge, West Midlands, in 1976. They were part of the new wave of British heavy metal movement and are cited by bands such as Metallica and Megadeth as a significant early influence. The original members were schoolfriends Brian Tatler (guitarist) and Duncan Scott (drummer), who were joined by singer Sean Harris in the same year, and bass player Collin Kimberley in 1978.

== History ==
=== Early history ===
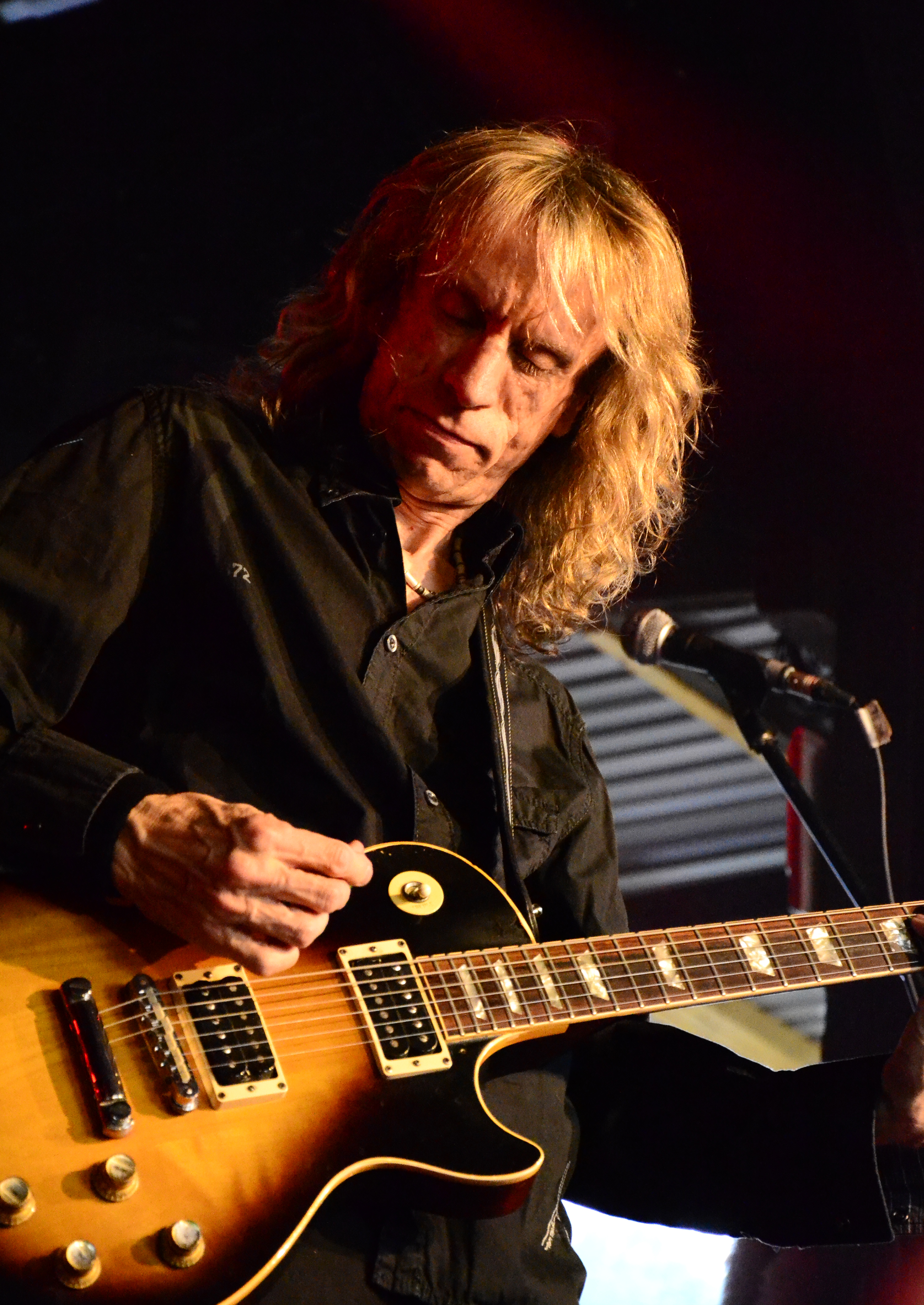
Lead guitarist Brian Tatler, the band's sole consistent member

Diamond Head were formed in 1976 in Stourbridge by schoolfriends Brian Tatler and Duncan Scott. In June 1976 they found singer Sean Harris, who was in the same year, and went through three bass players before settling on Collin Kimberley in Feb 1978. The band recorded two self-financed demo tapes in 1979. They were recorded within six hours on a four-track, one of which was sent to Geoff Barton at Sounds. The timing was perfect with the emergence of the new wave of British heavy metal. In 1979/80, Diamond Head were managed by budding local managers Dave Morris and Ian Frazier. Morris put some money into the band and tried to get the band a record deal; Frazier took to driving the band around the UK when on tour. Sean Harris's mother (Linda Harris) persuaded her boss and boyfriend (Reg Fellows) to see the band with a view to investing in them. Diamond Head's demos and live reputation gained enough attention for the band to get two support dates with AC/DC and one with Iron Maiden at The Lyceum, London. Although several record companies expressed interest in signing the band, and their managers secured a couple of offers, none were deemed worthy by Fellows and Linda Harris, who were now beginning to advise Sean Harris as he still lived at home with his mother.

Internal professional disputes regarding Diamond Head's representation led to the departure of managers Morris and Frazier, leaving Reg Fellows and Linda Harris in sole control. Consequently, while contemporary New Wave of British Heavy Metal acts secured major label contracts and began entering the U.S. market, Diamond Head remained independent. Guitarist Brian Tatler attributes this to the managers' unrealistic expectations regarding contract terms; when no suitable offer materialized, Fellows opted to record an album rapidly at the local 24-track studio where the band had tracked their debut single, "Shoot Out the Lights." In a transaction involving no upfront payment, studio owner Muff Murfin provided one week of recording time in exchange for 50 percent of the band's publishing rights for fifteen years.

Despite the master tapes being circulated to various labels, the debut album, Lightning to the Nations, failed to attract a recording contract. Their management subsequently coordinated a release of 1,000 copies through Happy Face Records, an independent label owned by Murfin. To minimize production costs, the album was issued in a plain white sleeve without a title or track listing, intended by management to be perceived as a "demo" recording; 250 of these copies were signed by the band members. These initial pressings were sold for £3.50 at live performances and via mail-order through a six-week advertisement in Sounds. However, because the band's management failed to pay for the media placement, the publication ultimately pursued legal action against them.

The original stereo master tapes were lost after they were sent to the German record company, Woolfe Records, who released a vinyl version of the album with a new sleeve. The tapes were not returned until they were eventually tracked down by Lars Ulrich and Phonogram Germany for inclusion on the 1990 compilation album, New Wave of British Heavy Metal '79 Revisited.

In 1980, Pete Winkelman from Wolverhampton got involved and tried to sign Diamond Head to his new label, Media Records. Winkelman had been a record plugger and he advised the band to change management but this advice was not heeded. In the end, Diamond Head only agreed to make one single for Winkelman, a re-recorded version of "Sweet & Innocent" b/w "Streets of Gold", which came out around October 1980.

In January 1981, Diamond Head successfully opened for April Wine on their UK tour. An ambitious UK tour was planned for the summer as a way of being perceived as being more popular than they actually were. An EP called Diamond Lights was recorded quickly in three days to help pay towards the expenses. They also hired the Wolverhampton chapter of Hells Angels to perform security duties on the whole tour. They bypassed promoters and booked the venues with a local agent to avoid paying a percentage, but with little promotion for the tour, it lost money.

The only A&R man who was determined to sign the band was Charlie Eyre, who quit his job at A&M and joined MCA in order to sign Diamond Head and Musical Youth. Discussions went on for around six months until the band finally signed a five-album deal on 1 January 1982.

=== Borrowed Time ===
First on the agenda was to record and release the Four Cuts EP, which contained two early era songs, "Shoot Out the Lights" and "Dead Reckoning", and the band did a whistle-stop UK tour of the clubs to promote it. A link-up with agent Neil Warnock at The Agency secured Diamond Head a Friday night slot on the Reading Festival bill in 1982, albeit as late and unadvertised replacements for Manowar. Their set was recorded by the BBC and later released in 1992 through Raw Fruit Records as the Friday Rock Show Sessions.

Their first MCA album, Borrowed Time, featured a lavish Rodney Matthews-illustrated gatefold sleeve based on the album's Elric theme and was the most expensive sleeve commissioned by MCA at the time. The album was somewhat successful commercially, climbing to No 24 in the UK Albums Chart. The band were able to perform a full-scale UK tour at premier venues such as London's Hammersmith Odeon.

To support the album, Diamond Head's released their sixth single, "In the Heat of the Night", backed with live versions of "Play It Loud" and "Sweet and Innocent" recorded at the Zig-Zag club, and an interview with DJ Tommy Vance (although the latter was not available on the 12").

=== Canterbury ===
Once the two-week UK tour was over, they were told to start writing the next album. The band tried a more experimental sounding follow-up to Borrowed Time, tentatively titled Making Music which was re-named Canterbury in 1983. Using top engineer Mike Shipley at an expensive London studio, called Battery in Willesden, put immense pressure on the band. Scott struggled to adapt to this new level of scrutiny and was fired, after completing just six drum tracks in three weeks. Then once all the bass parts had been recorded, Kimberley also quit Diamond Head. The album now fell to Harris and Tatler to finish causing the former to almost have a nervous breakdown. The initial success of the album was stalled as the first 20,000 copies suffered vinyl pressing problems, causing the LP to jump. It made number 32 in the UK Albums Chart, and it was noted that the album cost more to make but sold less. Diamond Head were invited to open that year's Monsters of Rock festival and, for the first time, toured Europe as special guests of Black Sabbath. On 1 January 1984, MCA did not pick up the option for a third album.

=== 1984 to 2000 ===
In early 1984, Diamond Head did an 18-date UK tour which lost money. Harris and Tatler continued to write together, and in October/November, Diamond Head re-convened in a purpose-built studio in Stambermill, West Midlands, to record their next album. It was never finished, and the band fell apart in early 1985. Tatler took over the running of the studio called RPK while Harris signed a solo deal with Pete Winkelman's new label I Major Records. This culminated in Harris and Robin George making an expensive album together under the name Notorious. In 1990, Winkelman encouraged Harris to make another Diamond Head record and so put him and Tatler back in touch after a long break. The band did two UK tours, and recorded what eventually became, Death and Progress it was released in June 1993, featuring guest contributions by Tony Iommi of Black Sabbath and Dave Mustaine of Megadeth. The reunion proved short-lived, as the group neared a dissolution immediately following the album's release. Diamond Head’s final performance of this period took place at the Milton Keynes Bowl, where they opened for Metallica and Megadeth. By late 1992, Harris’s growing dissatisfaction with the record and his partnership with Tatler led to a search for new creative directions. Pete Winkelman attempted to secure a contract with RCA Records for a restructured ensemble featuring a revised lineup; however, after a single performance in Northampton under the pseudonym Magnetic AKA, a recording deal failed to materialize, resulting in the project's collapse.

=== 2000s ===
In 2000, Harris and Tatler reunited for a series of acoustic performances in the UK. Although they began recording a four-track acoustic EP, the project spanned two years; by the time it was released on the band's independent label, their acoustic phase had concluded. Diamond Head subsequently reformed as an electric ensemble to perform their debut U.S. concert at the Metal Meltdown Festival in New Jersey on 5 April 2002, followed by a 14-date UK tour in August. During the recording of a new studio album at Mad Hat Studio in Wolverhampton with producer Andy Scarth, internal tensions rose when Harris proposed renaming the group "Host." Following Harris's failure to secure a distribution deal for the £16,000 project in 2003, the band became inactive, ultimately leading to a permanent professional separation between Diamond Head and Harris later.

=== Nick Tart era ===
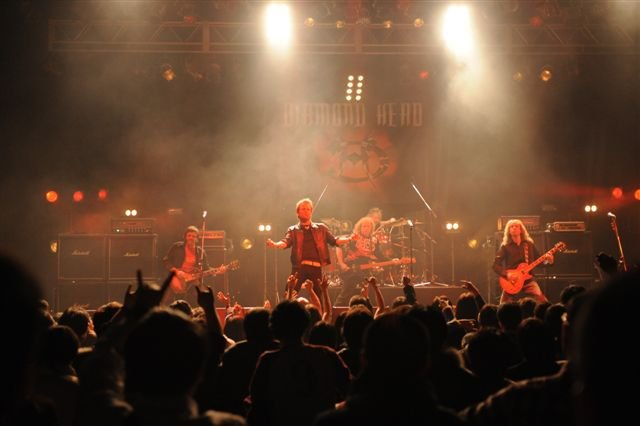
Diamond Head performing in Japan, 2008

Nick Tart (from Cannock) was asked to join Diamond Head in 2004, the band wrote and recorded the All Will Be Revealed album and released it in 2005. To promote this album, they completed a 22 date European tour with Megadeth. Brian Tatler commented that this was one of the best experiences of his life, and he regained his enjoyment for playing live with the band again. Diamond Head headlined a celebration of the 25th anniversary of the NWOBHM at the London Astoria, supported by Witchfynde, Bronz, Praying Mantis, and Jaguar. This concert was later released as a live CD titled It's Electric and also the band's first DVD, To the Devil His Due, in 2006. The band's rhythm guitarist Adrian Mills left the band and was replaced with Andy 'Abbz' Abberley, previously in Cannock band Chase with drummer Karl Wilcox. In 2007 Diamond Head released What's in Your Head? produced by Dave (Shirt) Nichols. In 2008, Nick announced that he and his family were going to emigrate to Brisbane. The band continued to tour but now has the extra expense of flying the singer backward and forwards from Australia. Diamond Head toured the US (twice) plus Japan and Europe, including two dates opening for the Big 4. Nick's last show with Diamond Head was 4 October 2013.

=== Rasmus Bom Andersen era and hiatus (2014–present) ===
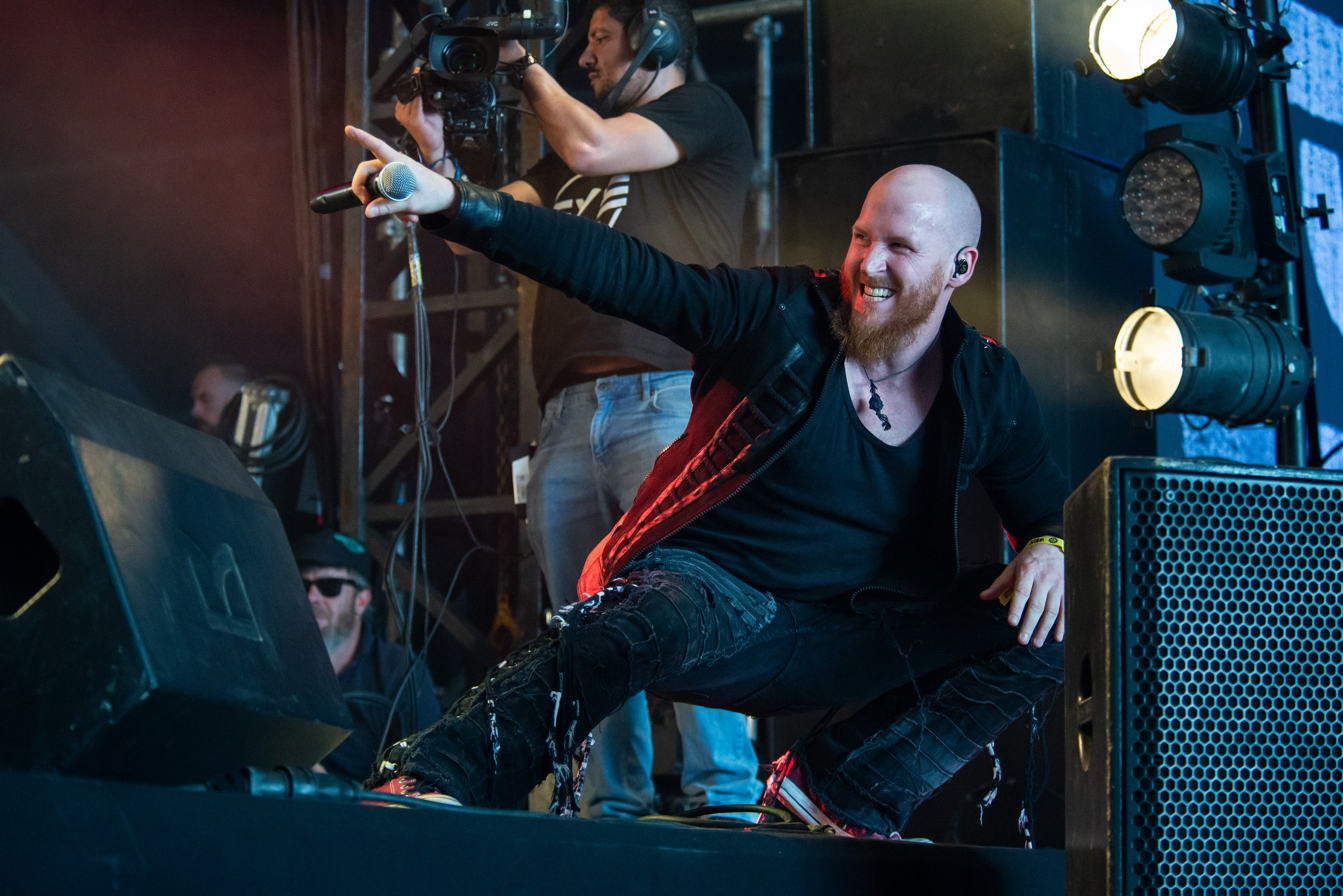
Rasmus Bom Andersen has been the band's lead vocalist since 2014.

After recruiting new vocalist Rasmus Bom Andersen (a Danish-born singer living in London) in 2014, Diamond Head toured the UK and began work on their self-titled album Diamond Head, released in 2016. The band took part in the 70000 Tons of Metal cruise around the Caribbean and toured the Canada, Europe and the US. Work began on their eighth studio album, The Coffin Train, in mid-2016, and it was released in May 2019. By this time, Diamond Head had signed to Silver Lining Records and is now managed by Siren Management. The album entered the UK Rock & Metal Albums Chart at number 5, ten places higher than the band's self-titled album. In 2018 Diamond Head did a UK and European tour and then opened for Black Star Riders across Europe in 2019.

On 1 September 2022 in an interview with TotalRock, guitarist Brian Tatler talked about an upcoming follow-up to their previous 2019 release. "We've pretty much got the material ready to go as demos. We've done rehearsals where we record the rehearsals and we've done home demos and things. In October/November 2022 Diamond Head opened for Saxon on an extensive thirty three date European and UK tour. many of the UK shows were recorded for a live album titled {Live and Electric} which was released on Silver Lining in 2025. In March 2023 Brian was given the opportunity to replace Paul Quinn in Saxon.

On 16 June 2025, Tatler announced the band was on hiatus due to his commitments with Saxon.

== Musical style and influences ==
Diamond Head have cited their early inspirations as classic 1970s British rock bands such as Deep Purple, Led Zeppelin, UFO, Black Sabbath, Judas Priest, and Free, Brian Tatler relating that the first albums he bought were Led Zeppelin's Led Zeppelin II and Deep Purple's Machine Head, and said that although a lot of his guitar work was inspired by Ritchie Blackmore and Michael Schenker, it was punk rock that showed him that anyone could form a band. Colin Kimberley commented Diamond Head got their complex sound from listening to bands like Black Sabbath and Rush and realising that a song with a single riff throughout was not interesting enough.

In a 2008 interview, Tatler stated that he now tries not to be influenced by modern bands and keep his sound, although he imagines that "little bits creep into the writing process."

== Legacy and influence ==
American Songwriter wrote, "Diamond Head may not be known to casual heavy metal fans, but they were part of the new wave of British heavy metal and influenced the early sounds of Metallica and Megadeth." The Guardian wrote, "If there’s a single song that epitomises" the sound of the new wave of British heavy metal era, it would be "Am I Evil?".

Many reasons have been cited why Diamond Head never achieved significant commercial success focused mainly on their change in musical direction with Canterbury and their delay in obtaining a record deal. Upon signing with MCA, Diamond Head encountered creative friction as the label pressured the group to adopt a more commercial sound. The band’s trajectory was further hindered by inexperienced representation; while contemporary acts such as Iron Maiden and Def Leppard benefited from professional music management, Diamond Head was managed by those lacking prior industry experience. Furthermore, while many of their peers in the New Wave of British Heavy Metal toured the United States during the 1980s, Diamond Head did not perform in the U.S. until 2002, when they appeared at Metal Meltdown IV in New Jersey.

Metallica have covered the likes of "Sucking My Love", "Am I Evil?" and "The Prince" during their initial performances. The Metal Up Your Ass live demo, recorded in November 1982, featured a live rendition of "Am I Evil?". "Sucking My Love" exists on various bootlegs that have been circulating since 1982, along with a recording on the early demo No Life Til Leather. Metallica's first official studio release of "Am I Evil?" came in 1984 as part of the Creeping Death 12-inch single paired with another NWOBHM classic, "Blitzkrieg", by the band of the same name. The two songs were also included in the first pressing of the Kill 'Em All LP when it was re-released by Elektra Records. A cover of "Helpless" was featured The $5.98 E.P. - Garage Days Re-Revisited in 1987 and "The Prince" was included as a B-side to the "One" single. The 1998 Garage Inc album featured four Diamond Head songs covered by Metallica - Am I Evil?, Helpless, The Prince and Its Electric.

During the Wherever We May Roam Tour, Metallica played "Am I Evil?" and "Helpless" with the original Diamond Head members on 5 November 1992 at NEC Arena in Birmingham. Additionally, Metallica performed "Am I Evil?" along with the other bands in the big four (Megadeth, Anthrax and Slayer) at the 2011 Sonisphere festival, and with Diamond Head themselves at the Sonisphere Festival in Knebworth in July 2011. The following day Brian performed "Helpless" with Metallica and Anthrax at the Sonisphere festival in Amnéville, France. In December 2011, Brian Tatler and Sean Harris joined Metallica onstage at the Fillmore Auditorium in San Francisco to celebrate Metallica's 30th Anniversary. Together they played "The Prince", "It's Electric", "Helpless" and "Am I Evil?". Tatler and Harris also took part in a group encore of "Seek and Destroy". Metallica have performed "Am I Evil?" onstage over 750 times. In June 2024, Brian Tatler joined Metallica in stage in Oslo, Norway, to play "Am I Evil?"; Kirk Hammett yielded lead guitar duties to Tatler, even bowing to him during the intro.

The Canadian new wave band Men Without Hats' 1991 album Sideways features a track called "Life After Diamond Head", a reference to the band.

== Band members ==
Current

- Brian Tatler – guitar, backing vocals (1976–1985, 1991–1994, 2000–present)
- Karl Wilcox – drums (1991–1994, 2002–present)
- Andy "Abbz" Abberley – guitar (2006–present)
- Rasmus Bom Andersen – lead vocals (2014–present)
- Paul Gaskin – bass, backing vocals (2022–present)

Former

- Sean Harris – lead vocals (1976–1985, 1990–1994, 2000–2004), occasional rhythm guitar (1976–1985, 1990–1994)
- Colin Kimberley – bass, backing vocals (1978–1983)
- Duncan Scott – drums (1976–1983)
- Robbie France – drums (1983–1985; died 2012)
- Mervyn Goldsworthy – bass (1983–1984)
- Josh Phillips – keyboards (1983–1985)
- Dave Williamson – bass, backing vocals (1984–1985)
- Eddie Moohan – bass, backing vocals (1991–1992, 2002–2016)
- Pete Vuckovic – bass, backing vocals (1992–1994)
- Floyd Brennan – guitar, backing vocals (2000–2002)
- Adrian Mills – guitar (2003–2006)
- Nick Tart – lead vocals (2004–2014)
- Dean Ashton – bass, backing vocals (2016–2022)

== Discography ==
=== Studio albums ===
- Lightning to the Nations (1980)
- Borrowed Time (1982) – [UK No. 24]
- Canterbury (1983) – [UK No. 32]
- Death and Progress (1993)
- All Will Be Revealed (2005)
- What's In Your Head? (2007)
- Diamond Head (2016) – [UK Rock No. 15]
- The Coffin Train (2019) – [UK Rock No. 5]
- Lightning to the Nations 2020 (2020) (re-recording with four bonus tracks)

=== Live albums ===
- The Friday Rock Show Sessions / Live at Reading (1992)
- Evil Live (1994)
- Live – In the Heat of the Night (2000)
- It's Electric (2006)
- Live at the BBC (2010)
- Live and Electric (2025)

=== Singles and EPs ===
- "Shoot Out the Lights" (1980)
- "Sweet and Innocent" (1980)
- "Waited Too Long"/"Play It Loud" (1981)
- Diamond Lights EP (1981)
- Call Me EP (1982)
- Four Cuts EP (1982)
- In the Heat of the Night (1982) – [UK No. 67]
- Makin' Music (1983) – [UK No. 87]
- Out of Phase (1983) – [UK No. 80]
- "Wild on the Streets"/"I Can't Help Myself" 12" (1991)
- Rising Up (1992)
- To Heaven from Hell EP (1997)
- Acoustic: First Cuts EP (2002)
- Belly of the Beast 7" clear promo Flexi disc (2019)

=== Compilations ===
- Behold the Beginning (1986)
- Am I Evil (1987)
- Sweet and Innocent (1988)
- Singles (1992)
- Helpless (1996)
- The Best of Diamond Head (1999)
- Diamond Nights (2000)
- The Diamond Head Anthology: Am I Evil? (2004)
- The MCA Years (2009)
- Lightning to the Nations: The White Album (2011)
- Am I Evil?: The Best Of (2013)

=== DVDs ===
- To the Devil His Due (21 November 2006)

== See also ==
- List of new wave of British heavy metal bands
