= Lightning to the Nations =

1980 studio album by Diamond Head

- Original "white album" cover; individual copies were signed by various band members

Studio album by Diamond Head
- Released: 3 October 1980
- Recorded: March 1980
- Studio: Old Smithy Recording Studio, Worcester, England
- Genre: Heavy metal
- Length: 41:37
- Label: Happy Face
- Producer: Reg Fellows

Diamond Head chronology
Lightning to the Nations (1980)	Borrowed Time (1982)

Alternative cover
- 1993 Metal Blade cover

Professional ratings
Review scores
Source	Rating
AllMusic	4.5/5 stars
Collector's Guide to Heavy Metal	10/10
Sounds	3.5/5 stars

Lightning to the Nations (also known as The White Album) is the debut album by British heavy metal band Diamond Head. The album was recorded in 1980 (after the 1977 and 1979 demos) and released later that year through Happy Face Records, a label owned by the producer Muff Murfin of The Old Smithy studio of Worcester, due to lack of interest from major labels and the band feeling that they needed to get the ball rolling as other bands from the same era, such as Iron Maiden and Def Leppard, were already becoming big names.

It was originally released in a plain white sleeve with no title or track listing, and was subsequently named after the first track on the album. Metal Blade Records re-released it on CD in 1992. In 2001, it was re-issued in its original "White Album" form by Sanctuary Records, featuring seven bonus tracks that were featured on singles and EPs from this era.

== Background and recording ==
Diamond Head had gained enough attention to tour as support with AC/DC and Iron Maiden. Although a clutch of record companies fought to sign the band, none were willing to fully commit. The fact that the band was at the time managed by Sean Harris' mother (Linda Harris) did not help the band's commercial momentum. So, while other new wave of British heavy metal bands were signed to major labels and were headlining their own tours, Diamond Head were growing increasingly impatient and decided that they would release their material through their own label, Happy Face Records.

The album was recorded within seven days at The Old Smythy Studio in Worcester, which the band described as 'dead'. This original album came in a plain sleeve with no title, having on it only a signature of one of the band members and no track listings. The reason for this was that the band's new manager, Reg Fellows, owned a cardboard factory and could produce blank sleeves at low cost. The reason for recording this album was an attempt to lay down some tracks so they could send it to a record company who would be more willing to release it, as the recording costs had already been covered; this idea came from Fellows and Linda Harris (by then tour manager).

== Release and promotion ==
There were originally only 1,000 copies pressed of the album, which were only available at the band's concerts or through mail-order at a price of £3.50. The only mail-order advertisement appeared in British music magazine 'Sounds' and ran for four weeks. However, the band did not pay for any advertisements and ended up being sued.

This album has become one of the most sought-after items from the time for record collectors. Later, there was a second pressing of 1000 copies that included track listings. The only original one-and-a-quarter-inch master tapes were lost for years after the band sent them to the German record company Woolfe Records, who did release the album (theirs having a front cover with a map of the world burning).

In 1993, Metal Blade Records released the first official CD version of the entire album. They did not attempt to find the master tapes or create a professional transfer from the original vinyl version and used a remix instead (made in 1986). Additionally, the track "It's Electric" has a major mastering error: the intro of the song is missing and it skips in shortly before the vocals start. High Vaultage Records released another version of the album in 1997, this time sourced from the German Woolfe Records LP. As a bonus, most of the 7" single tracks from that era were included. In 2001, a Sanctuary Records release came out. It includes the same mastering as the High Vaultage CD, which had since gone out of print. The 2011 Deluxe Edition, remastered by Andy Pearce, includes the original album sourced from the rediscovered master tape. This release, the 2016 HNE Recordings Ltd release, and the 2022 Silver Lining Music release are the only CD releases sourced from the original tapes; all other CD versions include either the 1986 remix or the High Vaultage vinyl dubs.

== Style ==
Musically, the album's tracks are characterized by their "raw, unrelenting attack." Technically, the album's instrumentation makes use of staccato guitar riffs, harmonized lead guitar parts, and galloped rhythms.

== Legacy and influence ==
The album brought Diamond Head to the forefront of the new wave of British heavy metal scene and was a big influence on many later metal bands, including Metallica and Megadeth. The former have covered songs such as "The Prince", "Sucking My Love", "Am I Evil?", "It's Electric", and "Helpless" throughout their career and recorded most of them. Versions from various periods were compiled on Metallica's album Garage Inc.. As a result, Diamond Head became relatively well-known to Metallica fans and came to enjoy more exposure to a broader public in later years than similar NWOBHM bands from the late 1970s and early 1980s.

In 2008, the Japanese metal magazine Burrn! rated this album as the third-best "riff album" of all time, behind Black Sabbath's Master of Reality and Slayer's Reign in Blood. The Guitarists' Book of Heavy Metal ranked the track "Am I Evil?" at No. 5 on its list of the best metal riffs behind Iron Maiden's "The Number of the Beast".

In 2017, Rolling Stone ranked Lightning to the Nations 42nd on their list of "The 100 Greatest Metal Albums of All Time".

== Track listing ==
All tracks are written by Sean Harris and Brian Tatler.

Side one
No.	Title	Length
1.	"Lightning to the Nations"	4:15
2.	"The Prince"	6:27
3.	"Sucking My Love"	9:35

Side two
No.	Title	Length
4.	"Am I Evil?"	7:39
5.	"Sweet and Innocent"	3:13
6.	"It's Electric"	3:37
7.	"Helpless"	6:52

CD reissue bonus tracks (Castle Music)
No.	Title	Length
8.	"Shoot Out the Lights" (originally released as a single)	4:17
9.	"Streets of Gold" (originally released as a B-side for the "Sweet and Innocent" single)	3:34
10.	"Waited Too Long" (originally released on the double A-side single "Waited Too Long"/"Play It Loud")	3:53
11.	"Play It Loud" (originally released on the double A-side single "Waited Too Long"/"Play It Loud")	3:31
12.	"Diamond Lights" (originally released on the Diamond Lights EP)	3:31
13.	"We Won't Be Back" (originally released on the Diamond Lights EP)	4:18
14.	"I Don't Got" (originally released on the Diamond Lights EP)	4:20

== Personnel ==
Diamond Head

- Sean Harris – vocals, rhythm guitar on "Am I Evil?"
- Brian Tatler – lead and rhythm guitar
- Colin Kimberley – bass
- Duncan Scott – drums

Production

- Produced by Reg Fellows and Diamond Head, except:

- "Streets of Gold" produced by Robin George and Diamond Head
- "Waited Too Long" and "Play It Loud" produced by Tony Wilson
- "Diamond Lights", "We Won't Be Back" and "I Don't Got" produced by Diamond Head and engineered by Leslie Penning

== Lightning to the Nations 2020 ==
Lightning to the Nations 2020

Studio album (re-recorded) by Diamond Head
- Released: 20 November 2020
- Recorded: 2020
- Studio: Raw Sound (London); Screaming Goat (St Martin de Chaulieu)
- Genre: Heavy metal
- Length: 60:53
- Label: Silver Lining
- Producer: Rasmus Bom Andersen

Diamond Head chronology
The Coffin Train (2019)	Lightning to the Nations 2020 (2020)

Lightning to the Nations 2020 is a re-recorded version of the original album, featuring a new line-up with vocalist Rasmus Bom Andersen. The album also has additional cover songs.

No.	Title	Writer(s)	Length
1.	"Lightning to the Nations" (2020 re-recorded version)		4:25
2.	"The Prince" (2020 re-recorded version)		5:53
3.	"Sucking My Love" (2020 re-recorded version)		7:13
4.	"Am I Evil?" (2020 re-recorded version)		8:26
5.	"Sweet and Innocent" (2020 re-recorded version)		3:42
6.	"It's Electric" (2020 re-recorded version)		3:19
7.	"Helpless" (2020 re-recorded version)		6:56
8.	"No Remorse" (Metallica cover)	James Hetfield, Lars Ulrich	6:28
9.	"Immigrant Song" (Led Zeppelin cover)	Jimmy Page, Robert Plant	3:20
10.	"Sinner" (Judas Priest cover)	Rob Halford, Glenn Tipton	6:50
11.	"Rat Bat Blue" (Deep Purple cover)	Ritchie Blackmore, Ian Gillan, Roger Glover, Jon Lord, Ian Paice	4:26

=== Personnel ===
Personnel taken from Lightning to the Nations 2020 CD booklet.

Diamond Head

- Brian Tatler – lead and rhythm guitars
- Rasmus Bom Andersen – vocals, orchestration, additional guitars
- Karl Wilcox – drums
- Andrew Abberley – rhythm and lead guitars
- Dean Ashton – bass, organ on "The Prince"

Additional personnel

- Rasmus Bom Andersen – production, mixing
- John Davis – mastering

=== Charts ===
Chart (2020)	Peak position
Scottish Albums (OCC)	77
UK Independent Albums (OCC)	26
UK Rock & Metal Albums (OCC)	7
