= Am I Evil? =

1980 song by Diamond Head

Song by Diamond Head

from the album Lightning to the Nations
- Released: 3 October 1980
- Recorded: March 1980
- Genre: Heavy metal
- Length: 7:43
- Label: Happy Face
- Songwriters: Sean Harris; Brian Tatler
- Producer: Reg Fellows

Music video
- "Am I Evil?" on YouTube

"Am I Evil?" is a song by British heavy metal band Diamond Head. Released on the band's 1980 debut album Lightning to the Nations, it remains the band's signature song. The song was written by lead vocalist Sean Harris and guitarist Brian Tatler and released by Happy Face Records, a label owned by the producer Muff Murfin of The Old Smithy studio of Worcester, England.

The song rose to international prominence after Metallica covered the song as a B-side on their 1984 single "Creeping Death"; the cover was then re-released on their 1998 cover album Garage Inc. The song was influenced by Black Sabbath's 1975 song "Symptom of the Universe". The song starts with an instrumental segment inspired by 'Mars, The Bringer of War' from Gustav Holst's The Planets (1914–16).

== Composition ==
"Am I Evil?" tells the story of a man who witnesses his mother being burned alive for being a witch. He seeks revenge on those responsible for her death by killing all 27 of them in the most gruesome manner. After seeing their bodies "in ice," he asks himself if he is evil for committing these murders (to which he replies yes).

Brian Tatler said initially that singer Sean Harris’s mum took offense over the opening lyrics, 'My mother was a witch,' but "she’s probably forgiven him now.” The song is listed in Kerrang!'s 50 Most Evil Songs Ever.

== Release and reception ==
The song was originally released on Diamond Head's 1980 debut, Lightning to the Nations, but then also re-recorded for their second album Borrowed Time. Previously, in 1979, the band had already performed the song in a televised performance at West Bromwich College, which was their first TV appearance. It remains a live favourite and is still included in the band's setlist to this day. However, Sean Harris has gotten fed up with continually playing "Am I Evil?", one of the reasons he took the stage dressed as the Grim Reaper during their performance at the National Bowl.

The song has roots with Gustav Holst's "Mars, the Bringer of War" (from The Planets Suite).

== Metallica cover ==
"Am I Evil?"

Song by Metallica
- A-side: "Creeping Death"
- Released: 23 November 1984
- Recorded: October 1984 (Sausalito, California, U.S.)
- Genre: Heavy metal; thrash metal
- Length: 7:50
- Label: Megaforce; Elektra
- Songwriters: Sean Harris; Brian Tatler
- Producers: Metallica; Flemming Rasmussen; Mark Whitaker

The song was covered by American thrash metal band Metallica, originally released as a B-side to the "Creeping Death" single in 1984, included on the 1988 Japanese re-release of its debut album, Kill 'Em All, and later re-released on Garage Inc. in 1998. The song has also been featured in Metallica's live set throughout its career, often in a faster and heavier version. Lead singer James Hetfield also changed the final chorus from "Am I evil? Yes, I am" to "Am I evil? Yes, I fucking am!" Diamond Head has stated that the band's members are flattered by the cover and that the royalties from it have enabled the band to continue.

In 2010, at The Big Four: Live from Sofia, Bulgaria concert, in an extended homage to the song, the united members of the "Big Four" of American thrash metal—Metallica, Anthrax, Slayer, and Megadeth—performed the song together. With the exclusion of Slayer's Tom Araya, Kerry King, and Jeff Hanneman (leaving only drummer Dave Lombardo), the combined members of these bands performed the first half of the song. The recording was released later on DVD (The Big Four: Live from Sofia, Bulgaria).

In 2024, Metallica would play the song live alongside Diamond Head member Brian Tatler.

In the 1996 video game The Neverhood, there is a cutscene in which Klaymen pulls a pin that keeps two halves of the Neverhood separated when the sides are coming together; an altered version of the Metallica cover is played.
