= List of Napalm Death band members =

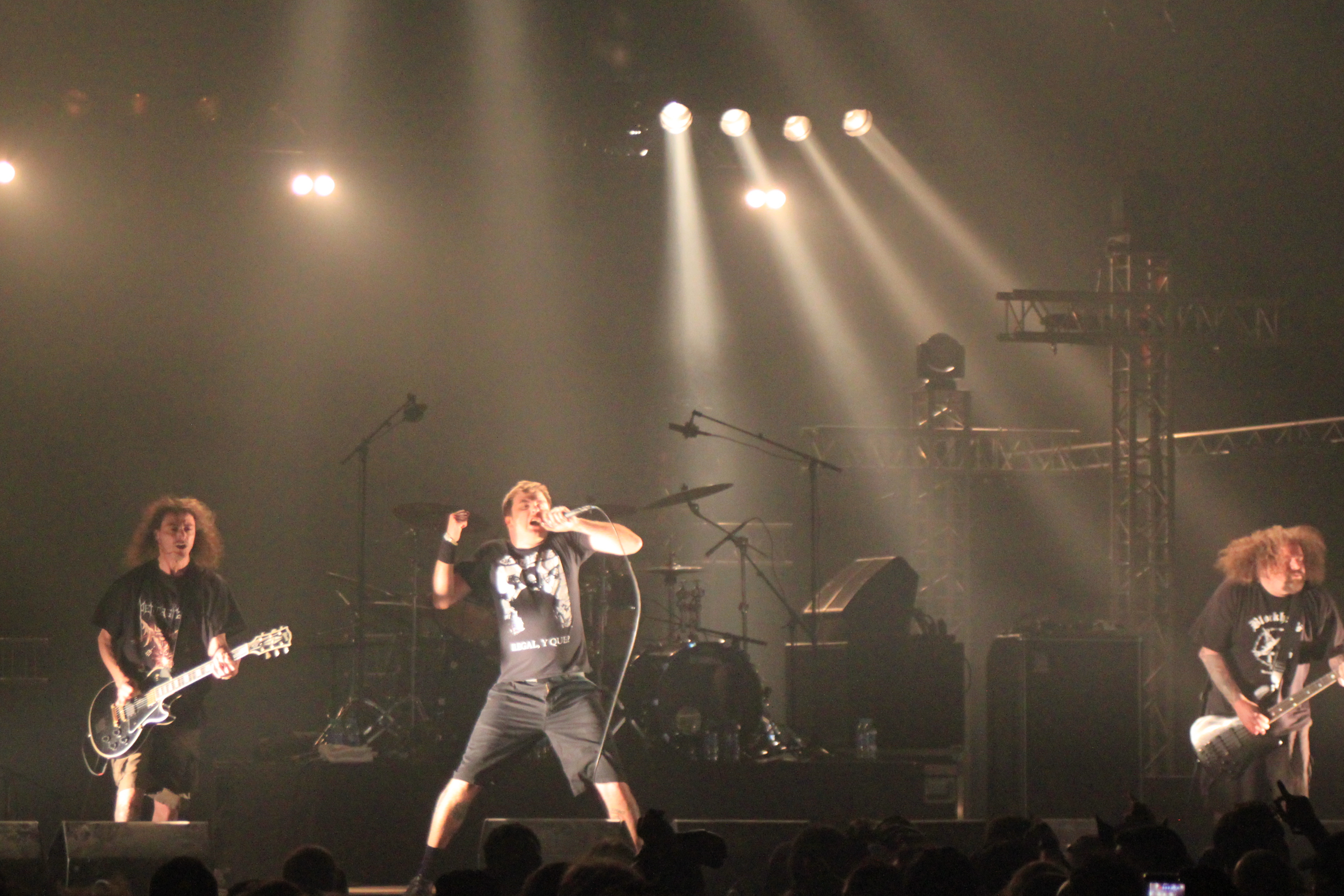
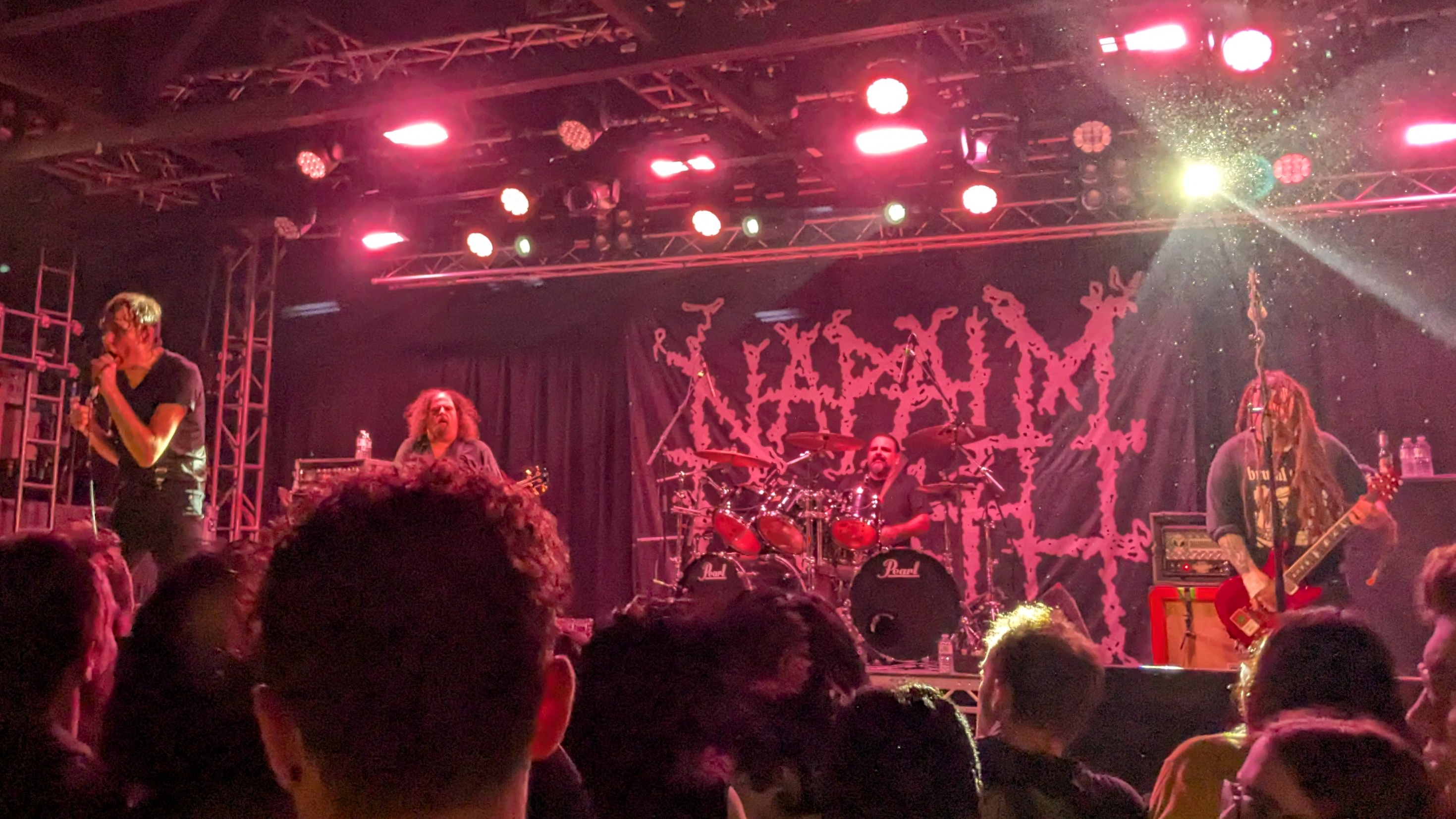
Three line-ups of Napalm Death in 1983, 1986, 2013 and 2025

Napalm Death are an English grindcore band, founded by Nic Bullen (bass guitar, vocals) and Miles Ratledge (drums) in May 1981 when the two were 12/13 years old. The band currently consists of bassist Shane Embury (since 1987), lead vocalist Mark "Barney" Greenway (since 1989), drummer Danny Herrera (since 1991) and guitarist John Cooke (a touring member from 2015).

== History ==
Bullen and Ratledge founded the band as an extension of their Fanzine writing. The two were joined by Daryl "Dez" Fedeski on guitar in August 1981, and Graham Robertson on bass in January 1982.

Fedeski departed that October, Robertson moved to guitar, and Bullen took over bass until Finbar Quinn joined on bass and backing vocals. The band entered a hiatus in June 1983 and played one concert on 8 June 1984, at which they were joined by Marian Williams on additional vocals.

In July 1985, the band consisted of Ratledge on drums, Bullen on bass guitar/vocals, Robertson and Damien Errington on guitars. This line up was short lived, as Bullen and Ratledge reverted the band to a trio with Justin Broadrick on guitar. The trio played their first concert on 31 August 1985. They were joined by Peter Shaw on bass in September, who recorded the demo Hatred Surge with the band.

The band split with Miles Ratledge soon after, with Bullen and Broadrick being joined by local fan Mick Harris. The trio first performed in December 1985 and recorded half an LP in August 1986. This was originally planned to be split with Atavistic but later became the A side to their debut, Scum.

After recording, the band were joined by Jim Whitely on bass guitar. This four piece played a few concerts before Broadrick left and Frank Healy joined as his temporary replacement.

Bullen, the sole remaining founding member, left in March 1987. The band found full time replacements in Bill Steer on guitar and Lee Dorrian on lead vocals. This line-up recorded the B side to Scum, which was released in 1987.

During promotion for Scum, Whitely departed and was replaced by Shane Embury, a friend of Harris and Bullen. This line-up recorded From Enslavement to Obliteration (1988) before Steer and Dorian departed after a Japanese tour in July 1989. Harris and Embury recruited Jesse Pintado (ex-Terrorizer) on guitar and Mark "Barney" Greenway (ex-Benediction) as lead singer. Mitch Harris (ex-Righteous Pigs) joined as second guitarist after the tour.

Mick Harris departed after releasing Harmony Corruption (1990) in February 1991. His replacement was Danny Herrera.

The next line-up change was Greenway's departure in 1996. He was replaced by Phil Vane of Extreme Noise Terror, a band with Greenway joined after his departure. Vane remained with the band for a few months before being expelled. Greenway then returned to record vocals for Inside the Torn Apart (1997); Vane subsequently re-joined Extreme Noise Terror.

Pintado departed by April 2005, having not played on their past two studio albums. He was not replaced and the band reverted to having one guitarist. Mitch Harris went on indefinite touring hiatus in 2014; his touring replacement has been John Cooke who had previously acted as road manager, driver, as well as substitute vocalist and bassist in 2010 and 2012 respectively. In 2026, on a podcast with Matt Mills from Heavy Stories Podcast Shane Embury confirmed that Mitch Harris is not in Napalm Death anymore. Other substitutes included ex-Brutal Truth and Nuclear Assault guitarist Erik Burke.

== Members ==
=== Current members ===
Image	Name	Years active	Instruments	Release contributions
	Shane Embury	1987–present	bass guitar; backing vocals	all releases except Scum (1987)
	Mark "Barney" Greenway	1989–1996; 1997–present	lead vocals	all releases from Harmony Corruption (1990) onwards
	Danny Herrera	1991–present	drums	all releases from Utopia Banished (1992) onwards
	John Cooke	2022–present (session/touring 2010, 2012 and 2014–2022) (Note: Cooke was road manager and driver for the band. When Greenway fell ill at one show in 2010, Cooke stepped on stage and sang 5 or 6 songs. He played bass when Embury fell ill in 2012. Cooke has been the band's primary touring guitarist since Mitch Harris' touring hiatus. He has since appeared in promo photos and was credited as a member on Resentment Is Always Seismic (2022).)	lead vocals (one off 2010); bass guitar (2012); guitar (2014–present); backing vocals (2014–present)	all releases from Apex Predator – Easy Meat (2015)

=== Former members ===
Image	Name	Years active	Instruments	Release contributions
	Nicholas "Nik Napalm" Bullen	1981–1983; 1984; 1985–1987	bass guitar (1981–1982); lead vocals	Scum (1987) A side and all demos
	Miles "Rat" Ratledge	1981–1983; 1984; 1985	drums	all demos from "Halloween" (1982) to "Hatred Surge" (1985)
	Daryl "Daz F" Fedeski	1981–1982	guitar	"Halloween" demo (1982); "And, Like Sheep, We Have All Gone Astray" demo (1982)
	Graham "Robbo" Robertson	1982; 1984; 1985	bass guitar (1982); guitar (1983, 1984, 1985)	"Halloween" demo (1982); "And, Like Sheep, We Have All Gone Astray" demo (1982); "Kak" demo (1983); "Unpopular Yawns of Middle Class Warfare" demo (1983)
	Finbar "Fin" Quinn	1983; 1984	bass guitar; backing vocals	"Kak" demo (1983); "Unpopular Yawns of Middle Class Warfare" demo (1983)
	Marian Williams	1984	additional vocals	none
	Damien Errington	1985	guitar	none
	Justin Broadrick	1985–1986	guitar; lead vocals (1986)	"Hatred Surge" demo (1985); "From Enslavement to Obliteration" demo (1986); Scum (1987) A side
	Mick Harris	1985–1991	drums; backing vocals (1987–1991)	all releases from "From Enslavement to Obliteration" demo (1986) to Death by Manipulation (1991); The DVD (2001)
	Peter "P-Nut" Shaw	1985	bass guitar	"Hatred Surge" (1985)
	Jim Whitely	1986–1987; 2004 (session)	bass guitar	Scum (1987) B side; Leaders Not Followers: Part 2 (2004)
	Frank Healy	1987	guitar	none
	Bill Steer	1987–1989	guitar	all releases from Scum (1987) B side to Mentally Murdered (1989); The DVD (2001) two tracks
	Lee Dorrian	1987–1989	lead vocals	all releases from Scum (1987) B side to Mentally Murdered (1989); The DVD (2001) two tracks
	Jesse Pintado	1989–2004 (died 2006)	guitar	all releases from Harmony Corruption (1990) to The DVD (2001)
	Mitch Harris	1989–2020 (studio only since 2014)	guitar; backing and occasional lead vocals	all releases from Harmony Corruption (1990) to Resentment is Always Seismic - A Final Throw of Throes (2022)
	Phil Vane	1996 (died 2011)	lead vocals	none

=== Touring musicians ===
Image	Name	Years active	Instruments	Notes
	Erik Burke	2015	guitar	Burke played guitar in place of Harris on a North American tour in 2015.
	Vernon Blake	2015; 2019; 2020	bass guitar	Blake replaced Embury on two occasions, first in 2015 and again in 2019 and 2020.
	Jesper Liveröd	2017	bass guitar	Liverod played in place of Embury in 2017.
	Adam Clarkson	2023–present	bass guitar; backing vocals	Clarkson played in place of Embury occasionally since 2023.
	Matt Sheridan	2026	bass guitar	Sheridan played bass on the NPR Tiny Desk Concert.

== Line-ups ==
Period	Members	Releases
May – August 1981	Nic Bullen – bass guitar, lead vocals; Miles Ratledge – drums	none
August 1981 – January 1982	Daryl Fedeski – guitar; Nic Bullen – bass guitar, lead vocals; Miles Ratledge – drums	none
January – September 1982	Nic Bullen – lead vocals; Daryl Fedeski – guitar; Graham Robertson – bass guitar; Miles Ratledge – drums	"Halloween" (1982); "And, Like Sheep, We Have All Gone Astray" (1982)
October – December 1982	Graham Robertson – guitar; Nic Bullen – bass guitar, lead vocals; Miles Ratledge – drums	none
January – June 1983	Nic Bullen – lead vocals; Graham Robertson – guitar; Fin Quinn – bass guitar, backing vocals; Miles Ratledge – drums	"Kak" (1983); "Unpopular Yawns of Middle Class Warfare" (1983)
band inactive June 1983 — June 1984
June 1984	Nic Bullen – lead vocals; Marian Williams – additional vocals; Graham Robertson – guitar; Fin Quinn – bass guitar, backing vocals; Miles Ratledge – drums	none
band inactive June 1984 — July 1985
July – August 1985	Graham Robertson – guitar; Damien Errington – guitar; Nic Bullen – bass guitar, lead vocals; Miles Ratledge – drums	none
August – September 1985	Justin Broadrick – guitar; Nic Bullen – bass guitar, lead vocals; Miles Ratledge – drums	none
September – December 1985	Nic Bullen – lead vocals; Justin Broadrick – guitar; Peter "P-Nut" Shaw – bass guitar; Miles Ratledge – drums	"Hatred Surge" (1985)
December 1985 – September 1986	Nic Bullen – bass guitar, lead vocals; Justin Broadrick – guitar, lead vocals (1986); Mick Harris – drums	"From Enslavement to Obliteration (Demo)" (1986); "Scum (Demo)" (1986); Scum (1987) A side
September — October 1986	Nic Bullen – lead vocals; Justin Broadrick – guitar; Jim Whitely – bass guitar; Mick Harris – drums	none
October 1986 – March 1987	Nic Bullen – lead vocals; Frank Healy – guitar; Jim Whitely – bass guitar; Mick Harris – drums	none
March – November 1987	Lee Dorian – lead vocals; Bill Steer – guitar; Jim Whitely – bass guitar; Mick Harris – drums, backing vocals	Scum (1987) B side
November 1987 – July 1989	Lee Dorian – lead vocals; Bill Steer – guitar; Shane Embury – bass guitar; Mick Harris – drums, backing vocals	From Enslavement to Obliteration (1988); Mentally Murdered (1989); The Complete Radio One Sessions (2000) eight tracks; The DVD (2001) remaining tracks
August – late 1989	Barney Greenway – lead vocals; Jesse Pintado – guitar; Shane Embury – bass guitar; Mick Harris – drums, backing vocals	The DVD (2001) one disc; Live at Rock City (2019)
Late 1989 – early 1991	Barney Greenway – vocals; Jesse Pintado – guitars; Mitch Harris – guitar; Shane Embury – bass guitar; Mick Harris – drums, backing vocals	Harmony Corruption (1990); Mass Appeal Madness (1991); The Complete Radio One Sessions (2000) three tracks; The DVD (2001) one disc
Early 1991 – 1996	Barney Greenway – lead vocals; Jesse Pintado – guitar; Mitch Harris – guitar, backing vocals; Shane Embury – bass guitar; Danny Herrera – drums	Utopia Banished (1992); Fear, Emptiness, Despair (1994); Diatribes (1996); Bootlegged in Japan (1998); The Complete Radio One Sessions (2000) remaining tracks
1996	Phil Vane – lead vocals; Jesse Pintado – guitar; Mitch Harris – guitar, backing vocals; Shane Embury – bass guitar; Danny Herrera – drums	none
1996 – early 2004	Barney Greenway – lead vocals; Jesse Pintado – guitar; Mitch Harris – guitar, backing vocals; Shane Embury – bass guitar; Danny Herrera – drums	Inside the Torn Apart (1997); Words from the Exit Wound (1998); Leaders Not Followers (1999); Enemy of the Music Business (2000); Order of the Leech (2002) without Pintado; Punishment in Capitals (2002); Leaders Not Followers: Part 2 (2004) without Pintado
Early 2004 – November 2014	Barney Greenway – lead vocals; Mitch Harris – guitar, backing vocals; Shane Embury – bass guitar, backing vocals; Danny Herrera – drums	The Code Is Red...Long Live the Code (2005); Smear Campaign (2006); Time Waits for No Slave (2009); Live in Japan – Grind Kaijyu Attack! (2009); Utilitarian (2012)
November 2014 – present	Barney Greenway – lead vocals; Mitch Harris – guitar, backing vocals (session only); John Cooke – guitar, backing vocals (session/touring until 2022); Shane Embury – bass guitar, backing vocals; Danny Herrera – drums	Apex Predator – Easy Meat (2015); Throes of Joy in the Jaws of Defeatism (2020); Resentment Is Always Seismic (2022)
