= Napalm Death discography =

- Studio albums: 16
- Extended plays: 14
- Live albums: 4
- Compilation albums: 3
- Singles: 8
- Video albums: 3
- Music videos: 21
- Cover albums: 2

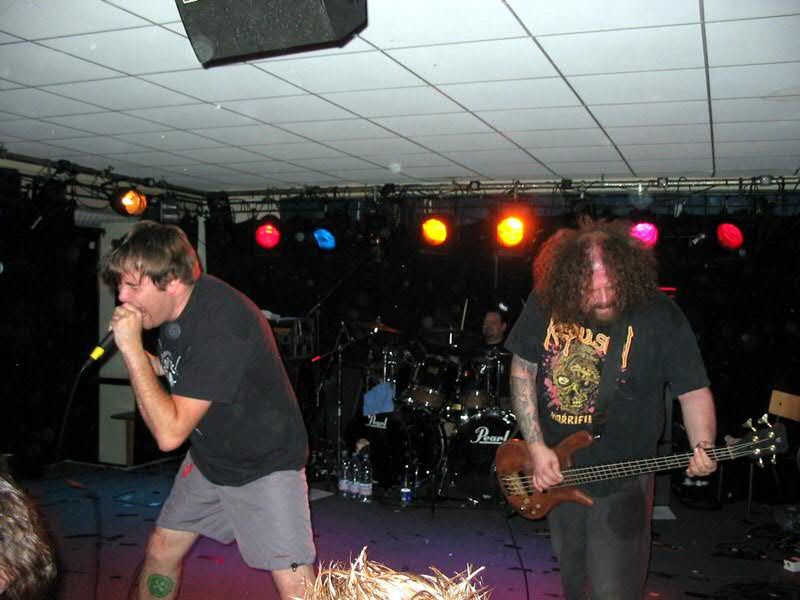
Napalm Death, Lemon Tree, Aberdeen, 2007

The following is a comprehensive discography of Napalm Death, an influential English grindcore/death metal band.

== Albums ==
=== Studio albums ===
List of studio albums, with selected chart positions
| Year | Album details | Peak chart positions | | | | | | | |
| Year | Album details | BEL (Wal) | FIN | FRA | GER | JPN | SWI | UK | US Indie |
|---|---|---|---|---|---|---|---|---|---|
| 1987 | Scum: Released: 1 July 1987; Label: Earache | — | — | — | — | — | — | — | — |
| 1988 | From Enslavement to Obliteration: Released: 16 September 1988; Label: Earache | — | — | — | — | — | — | — | — |
| 1990 | Harmony Corruption: Released: 30 July 1990; Label: Earache | — | — | — | — | — | — | 67 | — |
| 1992 | Utopia Banished: Released: 18 May 1992; Label: Earache | — | — | — | 60 | — | — | 58 | — |
| 1994 | Fear, Emptiness, Despair: Released: 2 May 1994; Label: Earache | — | — | — | 78 | — | — | — | — |
| 1996 | Diatribes: Released: 22 January 1996; Label: Earache | — | 38 | — | 94 | — | — | 73 | — |
| 1997 | Inside the Torn Apart: Released: 3 June 1997; Label: Earache | — | — | — | — | — | — | 129 | — |
| 1998 | Words from the Exit Wound: Released: 26 October 1998; Label: Earache | — | — | — | — | — | — | — | — |
| 2000 | Enemy of the Music Business: Released: 25 September 2000; Label: Spitfire | — | — | — | — | — | — | — | — |
| 2002 | Order of the Leech: Released: 21 October 2002; Label: Spitfire | — | — | — | — | — | — | — | — |
| 2005 | The Code Is Red...Long Live the Code: Released: 25 April 2005; Label: Century Media | — | — | — | — | — | — | — | — |
| 2006 | Smear Campaign: Released: 15 September 2006; Label: Century Media | — | — | 158 | — | 271 | — | — | — |
| 2009 | Time Waits for No Slave: Released: 23 January 2009; Label: Century Media | — | — | 178 | 95 | 189 | — | — | — |
| 2012 | Utilitarian: Released: 27 February 2012; Label: Century Media | 84 | 25 | 80 | 74 | 286 | 88 | 157 | 43 |
| 2015 | Apex Predator – Easy Meat: Released: 23 January 2015; Label: Century Media | 111 | — | 99 | 36 | 199 | 64 | 120 | 25 |
| 2020 | Throes of Joy in the Jaws of Defeatism: Released: 18 September 2020; Label: Century Media | — | 35 | — | 18 | 130 | 26 | — | — |
"—" denotes a release that did not chart.

=== Collaborative studio albums ===
| Year | Album details |
|---|---|
| 2025 | Savage Imperial Death March: With Melvins; Released: 2025; Label: Amphetamine Reptile; Formats: CD, LP |

=== Live albums ===
| Year | Album details |
|---|---|
| 1992 | Live Corruption: Released: 1992; Label: Earache; Formats: CD |
| 1998 | Bootlegged in Japan: Released: 22 June 1998; Label: Earache; Formats: CD |
| 2000 | The Complete Radio One Sessions: Released: March 2000; Formats: CD |
| 2002 | Punishment in Capitals: Released: 5 November 2002; Formats: CD, LP |
| 2009 | Live in Japan – Grind Kaijyu Attack!: Released: 2009; Label:Feto Records; Formats: LP |
| 2010 | Live at Rock City: Released: 2010; Formats: DI |

=== Compilation albums ===
| Year | Album details |
|---|---|
| 1991 | Death by Manipulation: Released: 19 August 1991; Label: Earache; Formats: CD, CS, LP, DI |
| 2003 | Noise for Music's Sake: Released: 8 July 2003; Label: Earache; Formats: CD |
| 2018 | Coded Smears and More Uncommon Slurs: Released: 30 March 2018; Label: Century Media; Formats: 2CD, 2LP, Digital |

=== Video albums ===
| Year | Album details |
|---|---|
| 1990 | Live Corruption: Released: 1990; Formats: VHS |
| 2001 | The DVD: Released: 15 October 2001; Formats: DVD |
| 2002 | Punishment in Capitals: Released: 5 November 2002; Formats: DVD |

=== Cover albums ===
| Year | Album details |
|---|---|
| 1999 | Leaders Not Followers: Released: 25 October 1999; Label: Dream Catcher; Formats: CD, CS, LP |
| 2004 | Leaders Not Followers: Part 2: Released: 23 August 2004; Label: Century Media; Formats: CD, LP, DI |

== EPs ==
| Year | EP details | Peak chart positions |
| Year | EP details | UK Ind. |
|---|---|---|
| 1988 | The Peel Session: Released: 1988; Label: Strange Fruit; Formats: CD, CS, LP | 13 |
| 1988 | The Curse: Released: September 1988; Formats: CD, CS, LP | — |
| 1989 | Double Peel Session: Released: 1989; Label: Strange Fruit; Formats: CD, CS, LP | 12 |
| 1989 | Napalm Death/S.O.B. split 7-inch: Released: 1989; Label: Sound of Burial; Formats: LP | — |
| 1989 | Mentally Murdered: Released: 29 August 1989; Label: Earache; Formats: CD, CS, LP | 6 |
| August 1990 | Suffer the Children: Released: August 1990; Label: Earache; Formats: CD, LP | — |
| 1991 | Mass Appeal Madness: Released: 1991; Label: Earache; Formats: CD, LP | — |
| 25 June 1992 | The World Keeps Turning: Released: 25 June 1992; Label: Earache; Formats: CD, LP | — |
| 15 June 1993 | Nazi Punks Fuck Off: Released: 15 June 1993; Label: Earache; Formats: LP | — |
| December 1995 | Greed Killing: Released: December 1995; Label: Earache; Formats: CD, CS, LP | — |
| 1997 | In Tongues We Speak (with Coalesce): Released: 20 January 1997; Label: Earache; Formats: LP | — |
| 1997 | Breed to Breathe: Released: 17 November 1997; Label: Earache; Formats: CD | — |
| 2005 | Tsunami Benefit (with The Haunted and Heaven Shall Burn): Released: 22 January 2005; Label: Century Media; Formats: CD, LP, DI | — |
| 2011 | Legacy Was Yesterday: Released: 2011; Label: Decibel; Formats: 7-inch vinyl | — |
| 2012 | Converge / Napalm Death: Released: 2012; Label: Self-released; Formats: 7-inch vinyl, digital download | — |
| 2013 | Napalm Death / Insect Warfare: Released: 20 April 2013; Formats: 7-inch vinyl | — |
| 2015 | Phonetics for the Stupefied (Split single with Voivod): Released: 23 October 2015; Label: Century Media; Formats: 7-inch vinyl | — |
| 2015 | An Extract (Strip It Clean) (Split single "The Mission Creep" with Heaven Shall Burn): Released: 11 December 2015; Label: Century Media; Formats: 7-inch vinyl | — |
| 2016 | Napalm Death / Melt-Banana: Released: 25 November 2016; Label: Ipecac; Formats: 7-inch vinyl | — |
| 2020 | Logic Ravaged by Brute Force: Released: 7 February 2020; Label: Century Media; Formats: Digital | — |
| 2022 | Resentment is Always Seismic – A Final Throw of Throes: Released: 11 February 2022; Label: Century Media; Formats: Digital | — |

== Singles ==
| Year | Single | Peak chart positions | | Album |
| Year | Single | UK | FRA | Album |
|---|---|---|---|---|
| 1989 | "You Suffer" | — | — | Scum |
| 1989 | "Mentally Murdered" | 114 | — | Mentally Murdered |
| 1990 | "Suffer the Children" | — | — | Harmony Corruption |
| 1994 | "More than Meets the Eye" | — | — | Fear, Emptiness, Despair |
| 1994 | "Plague Rages" | — | — | Fear, Emptiness, Despair |
| 1994 | "Hung" | — | — | Fear, Emptiness, Despair |
| 1995 | "Greed Killing" | — | — | Diatribes |
| 2012 | "Analysis Paralysis" | — | — | Utilitarian |

== Music videos ==
| Year | Song | Director |
|---|---|---|
| 1990 | "Suffer the Children" | Unknown |
| 1991 | "Mass Appeal Madness" | Unknown |
| 1992 | "The World Keeps Turning" | Unknown |
| 1994 | "Plague Rages" | Unknown |
| 1996 | "Greed Killing" | Unknown |
| 1997 | "Breed To Breathe" | Unknown |
| 2004 | "Lowlife" | Unknown |
| 2005 | "Silence Is Deafening" | Roger Johansson |
| 2006 | "When All Is Said and Done" | Kevin Wildt |
| 2007 | "You Suffer" | Unknown |
| 2009 | "Time Waits for No Slave" | Tom Blyth |
| 2010 | "On the Brink of Extinction" | Daniel Brand |
| 2012 | "Analysis Paralysis" | Mitch Harris |
| 2012 | "The Wolf I Feed" | Tim Fox |
| 2015 | "Smash a Single Digit" | Michael Panduro |
| 2015 | "How the Years Condemn" | Costin Chioreanu |
| 2016 | "Dear Slum Landlord" | Costin Chioreanu |
| 2018 | "Standardization" | Costin Chioreanu |
| 2020 | "Amoral" | Michael Panduro |
| 2020 | "A Bellyful of Salt and Spleen" | Sam Edwards & Khaled Lowe |
| 2021 | "Contagion" | Marc Nickel & Ljuba Generalova |
| 2022 | "Resentment is Always Seismic (Dark Sky Burial Dirge)" (Visualizer Video) | Chariot of Black Moth |

== Compilation appearances ==
- Chapter 3 – Various Artists (by Jako of "The Joy of Propaganda", 2 songs, 1982)
- Ruptured Gut – Various Artists (by Twisted Tapes, 2 songs, 1982)
- Twisted Nervous Breakdown – Various Artists (by Twisted Tapes, 1 song, 1982)
- Subversive Elements – Various Artists (2 songs, 1982)
- Bullshit Detector #3 : "Crucifixion of Possessions" (1984)
- North Atlantic Noise Attack : "Scum", "Life?", "Retreat To Nowhere" (different from LP versions; same recording session as "Internal Animosity" from Pathological Compilation) 1989
- Hardcore Holocaust : "Moral Crusade", "M.A.D.", "Divine Death", "Control" 1989
- Grind Crusher : "The Missing Link" 1989
- Grind Crusher – free 7-inch : "You Suffer" 1989
- Hardcore Holocaust II Peel Sessions : "Walls/Raging in Hell/Conform or Die/S.O.B." 1990
- Pathological Compilation : "Internal Animosity" – unreleased song 1990
- Grind Crusher – The Ultimate Earache : "The World Keeps Turning" 1992
- Masters of Brutality I : "Suffer the Children" 1992
- Masters of Brutality II : "The World Keeps Turning" 1992
- Virus 100 : "Nazi Punks Fuck Off" – unreleased song 1992
- Earplugged I : "Plague Rages" and "State of Mind" 1994
- Earplugged I (Japanese release): "I Abstain" 1994
- Rareache : "Living in Denial" and "Internal Animosity" – unreleased songs 1995
- Better Read Than Dead: ?? (1996)
- Mortal Kombat (soundtrack motion picture) : "Twist the Knife (Slowly)" 1996
- Metallurgy I : "Greed Killing" demo version – unreleased song 1996
- Earplugged II : "Breed to Breathe" 1997
- Earplugged III: "The Infiltraitor" 1998
- Hellspawn : "Breed to Breathe" remixed by DELTA 9 – unreleased song 1998
- Anti Racist Action : "Unchallenged Hate" live – unreleased song (only in America) 1998
- Hard Music News Vol 2: "The Icing on the Hate" 2002
- What Lies Beneath: "Silence Is Deafening" 2005
- Earache Summer Sampler 2007: "Scum (Remastered)" 2007
- Grind Madness at the BBC : 34 Songs from Peel Sessions, 2009

== Demos ==
- "Halloween" (1982)
- "And, Like Sheep, We Have All Gone Astray" (1982)
- "Kak" (1983)
- "Unpopular Yawns of Middle Class Warfare" (1983)
- "Hatred Surge" (1985)
- "From Enslavement to Obliteration (Demo)" (1986)
- "Scum (Demo)" (1986)

All demos are self-produced. "Hatred Surge" and "From Enslavement to Obliteration" were rereleased in 2019 as a combined LP record.

== Webinks ==
- Discography of Napalm Death in Encyclopaedia Metallum
