= Noise for Music's Sake =

Compilation album by Napalm Death
- Released: 8 July 2003
- Recorded: Various
- Genre: Death metal; grindcore; Deathgrind
- Length: 153:34
- Label: Earache
- Producer: Various

Napalm Death chronology
Punishment in Capitals (2002)	Noise for Music's Sake (2003)	Leaders Not Followers: Part 2 (2004)

Professional ratings
Review scores
Source	Rating
Allmusic	4.5/5 stars
The Encyclopedia of Popular Music	4/5 stars
The Metal Forge	9/10

Noise for Music's Sake is a double-disc compilation by British band Napalm Death. It was released on 8 July 2003 on Earache Records. This album is a retrospective of the band's entire career. The first disc is a best-of compilation; the second disc contains rarities. The booklet includes 20 pages with interviews of band members Shane Embury and Mark "Barney" Greenway. It also includes a guide to all the songs from the second disc, and a complete "Family Tree" detailing every person who was ever in the band.

== Track listing ==
=== Disc one ===
No.	Title	Album	Length
1.	"The Kill"	Scum	0:20
2.	"Scum"	Scum	2:37
3.	"You Suffer"	Scum	0:01
4.	"Deceiver"	Scum	0:27
5.	"Hung"	Fear, Emptiness, Despair	3:48
6.	"Antibody"	Greed Killing	2:50
7.	"Unchallenged Hate"	Mass Appeal Madness	2:07
8.	"Siege of Power"	Suffer The Children	3:32
9.	"Greed Killing"	Greed Killing	3:04
10.	"Suffer the Children"	Harmony Corruption	4:20
11.	"Mass Appeal Madness"	Mass Appeal Madness	3:28
12.	"Next of Kin to Chaos"	Words from the Exit Wound	4:08
13.	"Judicial Slime"	Utopia Banished	2:37
14.	"Lucid Fairytale"	From Enslavement to Obliteration	1:02
15.	"If the Truth Be Known"	Harmony Corruption	4:10
16.	"Plague Rages"	Fear, Emptiness, Despair	3:50
17.	"Social Sterility"	Mass Appeal Madness	1:12
18.	"From Enslavement to Obliteration"	From Enslavement to Obliteration	1:35
19.	"Lowpoint"	Inside the Torn Apart	3:16
20.	"Contemptuous"	Utopia Banished	4:22
21.	"Diatribes"	Diatribes	3:50
22.	"The Chains that Bind Us"	Harmony Corruption	4:06
23.	"Armageddon X 7"	Fear, Emptiness, Despair	3:14
24.	"Breed to Breathe"	Breed to Breathe	3:15
25.	"The World Keeps Turning"	The World Keeps Turning	3:17
26.	"The Infiltraitor"	Words from the Exit Wound	4:30
27.	"Nazi Punks Fuck Off"	Nazi Punks Fuck Off!	1:27
Total length:			76:38

=== Disc two ===
No.	Title	Album	Length
1.	"Rise Above"	Mentally Murdered	2:41
2.	"Missing Link"	Mentally Murdered	2:14
3.	"Mentally Murdered"	Mentally Murdered	2:09
4.	"Walls of Confinement"	Mentally Murdered	2:55
5.	"Cause and Effect"	Mentally Murdered	1:23
6.	"No Mental Effort"	Mentally Murdered	4:08
7.	"Pride Assassin"	Mass Appeal Madness	2:05
8.	"Avalanche Master Song" (featuring Godflesh, live at ICA, London, 29 June 1990)		5:00
9.	"One and the Same"	Utopia Banished bonus disc	1:47
10.	"Sick and Tired"	Utopia Banished bonus disc	1:24
11.	"Malignant Trait"	Utopia Banished bonus disc	2:17
12.	"Killing with Kindness"	Utopia Banished bonus disc	2:01
13.	"Means to an End"	The World Keeps Turning	2:56
14.	"Insanity Excursion"	The World Keeps Turning	2:15
15.	"Truth Drug"	Fear, Emptiness, Despair bonus track	3:50
16.	"Living in Denial"	Fear, Emptiness, Despair bonus track	2:58
17.	"Food Chains"	Coalesce split	3:14
18.	"Upward and Uninterested"	Coalesce split	2:24
19.	"I Abstain"	Utopia Banished Demo	3:33
20.	"Politics of Common Sense"	At the Gates split	2:59
21.	"Internal Animosity"	Pathological compilation	5:19
22.	"Scum"	North Atlantic Noise Attack compilation	2:21
23.	"Life"	North Atlantic Noise Attack compilation	0:37
24.	"Retreat to Nowhere"	North Atlantic Noise Attack compilation	0:27
25.	"Remain Nameless" (Pete Coleman original mixdown)		3:32
26.	"Twist the Knife (Slowly)" (Pete Coleman original mixdown)		2:51
27.	"Deceiver" (with Swanky's Intro, live in Wakken, Belgium, 11 July 1987)		0:47
28.	"The Traitor" (live at The Mermaid, Birmingham, UK, 1 November 1986)		3:23
29.	"Abattoir" (live at The Mermaid, Birmingham, UK, 30 March 1986)		3:12
Total length:			76:56

== Personnel ==
=== Napalm Death ===
- Mark "Barney" Greenway – vocals
- Jesse Pintado – guitar
- Mitch Harris – guitar
- Shane Embury – bass
- Danny Herrera – drums
- Nicholas Bullen – bass, vocals
- Mick Harris – drums
- Justin Broadrick – guitars
- Bill Steer – guitars (disc 2, 22–24)
- Lee Dorrian – vocals (disc 2, 21–24)
- Jim Whiteley – bass

=== Technical personnel ===
- Dan Tobin – compiling
- Shane Embury – compiling
- Mick Kenney – cover illustration, booklet
- Dom Lawson – liner notes
- Mick Usher – Napalm Death family tree
