= Punishment in Capitals =

Live album by Napalm Death
- Released: 5 November 2002
- Recorded: 12 April 2002
- Genre: Deathgrind
- Length: 63:48
- Label: Snapper
- Producer: Napalm Death

Napalm Death chronology
Order of the Leech (2002)	Punishment in Capitals (2002)	Noise for Music's Sake (2003)

Professional ratings
Review scores
Source	Rating
AllMusic	3/5 stars
Blabbermouth	8.5/10
The Encyclopedia of Popular Music	2/5 stars
The Metal Forge	8/10

Punishment in Capitals is a live CD and DVD release by the British band Napalm Death. It was recorded at the London ULU on 12 April 2002 at a benefit gig for animal rights organization Stop Huntingdon Animal Cruelty. This is the last release with Jesse Pintado.

== Track listing ==
No.	Title	Length
1.	"Lucid Fairytale"	1:02
2.	"Take the Poison"	1:44
3.	"Next on the List"	3:27
4.	"Constitutional Hell"	2:33
5.	"Suffer the Children"	3:52
6.	"Cleanse Impure"	2:56
7.	"Politicians" (Raw Power cover)	1:35
8.	"Breed to Breathe"	2:59
9.	"Vermin"	2:18
10.	"The World Keeps Turning"	2:40
11.	"Can't Play, Won't Pay"	3:20
12.	"Unchallenged Hate"	2:00
13.	"Volume of Neglect"	3:18
14.	"Narcoleptic"	2:30
15.	"Hung"	3:30
16.	"From Enslavement to Obliteration"	1:34
17.	"Scum"	2:41
18.	"Life"	0:42
19.	"The Kill"	0:28
20.	"Deceiver"	0:41
21.	"You Suffer"	0:01
22.	"Cure for a Common Complaint"	2:39
23.	"Mass Appeal Madness"	3:14
24.	"Greed Killing"	2:37
25.	"Instinct of Survival"	1:52
26.	"Nazi Punks Fuck Off" (Dead Kennedys cover)	1:19
27.	"Back from the Dead" (Death cover)	2:29
28.	"Siege of Power"	3:31

== DVD extras ==
- Video of the London ULU show
- 45 minute documentary/interview with Napalm Death
- Video of "If the Truth Be Known" in the Harmony Corruption sessions

Tokyo, Japan (5 August 1996)

1. My Own Worst Enemy
2. More Than Meets the Eye
- Note: this is a short video of Bootlegged in Japan

Santiago, Chile (19 October 1997)

1. Discordance
2. I Abstain
3. Unchallenged Hate
4. Greed Killing
5. Suffer the Children
6. Mass Appeal Madness

== Credits ==
- Mark "Barney" Greenway – lead vocals
- Jesse Pintado – guitar
- Mitch Harris – guitar, backing vocals
- Shane Embury – bass
- Danny Herrera – drums
