= The Complete Radio One Sessions =

Compilation album by Napalm Death
- Released: March 2000
- Genre: Death metal; grindcore
- Length: 46:57
- Producer: Napalm Death

Napalm Death chronology
Leaders Not Followers (1999)	The Complete Radio One Sessions (2000)	Enemy of the Music Business (2000)

The Peel sessions
- 1989 re-release

The Peel Sessions
- 1993 re-release

Professional ratings
Review scores
Source	Rating
Metal Hammer	9/10

The Complete Radio One Sessions is a compilation album by Napalm Death released in 2000, featuring all their tracks recorded for BBC radio sessions. Tracks 1–12, which were recorded for the John Peel show, were previously released as The Peel Sessions. There are three versions of The Peel Sessions: 1987, 1989, and finally, the album that compiled all the sessions together, the 1993 version. All these tracks were also released as part of this longer compilation The Complete Radio One Sessions.

== Track listing ==
No.	Title	Length
1.	"The Kill/Prison Without Walls/Dead"	0:59
2.	"Deceiver/Lucid Fairytale/In Extremis"	1:52
3.	"Blind to the Truth/Negative Approach/Common Enemy"	1:08
4.	"Obstinate Direction/Life/You Suffer"	1:52
5.	"Multi-National Corporations/Instinct of Survival/Stigmatised/Parasites"	4:13
6.	"Moral Crusade/Worlds Apart/M.A.D."	3:41
7.	"Divine Death/C.S./Control"	3:23
8.	"Walls/Raging in Hell/Conform or Die/SOB"	3:20
9.	"Unchallenged Hate/Mentally Murdered"	4:04
10.	"From Enslavement to Obliteration/Suffer the Children"	5:45
11.	"Retreat to Nowhere/Scum"	2:56
12.	"Deceiver/Social Sterility"	1:45
13.	"Glimpse into Genocide"	2:57
14.	"Greed Killing"	2:54
15.	"My Own Worst Enemy"	3:31
16.	"Antibody"	2:47
Total length:		46:57

== Credits ==
Tracks 1 to 8 (Tracks 1 to 4 - 1987, tracks 5 to 8 - 1988)

- Lee Dorrian - lead vocals
- Bill Steer - guitars
- Shane Embury - bass
- Mick Harris - drums, backing vocals

Tracks 9 to 12 (1990)

- Mark "Barney" Greenway - lead vocals
- Jesse Pintado - guitar
- Mitch Harris - guitar
- Shane Embury - bass
- Mick Harris - drums, backing vocals

Tracks 13 to 16 (1996)

- Mark "Barney" Greenway - vocals
- Jesse Pintado - guitars
- Shane Embury - bass
- Danny Herrera - drums
