= Order of the Leech =

Studio album by Napalm Death
- Released: 21 October 2002
- Recorded: Chappel Studios, South Thoresby; Parkgate Studios, Battle, East Sussex
- Genre: Deathgrind
- Length: 44:39
- Label: Spitfire
- Producer: Simon Efemey, Russ Russell

Napalm Death chronology
The DVD (2001)	Order of the Leech (2002)	Punishment in Capitals (2002)

Professional ratings
Review scores
Source	Rating
Allmusic	4/5 stars
Chronicles of Chaos	9/10
CMJ New Music Report	Favourable
Collector's Guide to Heavy Metal	7/10
The Encyclopedia of Popular Music	2/5 stars

Order of the Leech is the tenth studio album by the British grindcore band Napalm Death, released in 2002 through Spitfire. Although credited in the line-up, Jesse Pintado never performed. The second guitar is actually Mitch Harris overdubbing, hence marking this album's lineup as today's lineup. "The Great Capitulator" is 2:49. At the end of the song, a long silence follows from 2:50 to 9:56. At 9:57, a soundbite comes fading in of a fan speaking of his attitude to metal music, mentioning bands like Krabathor or Immortal. His speech is then translated in Czech. It is the last album in a trilogy to feature these kinds of soundbites, with the others being Leaders Not Followers EP and Enemy of the Music Business.

== Track listing ==
No.	Title	Writer(s)	Length
1.	"Continuing War on Stupidity"	Mark "Barney" Greenway; Mitch Harris	3:11
2.	"The Icing on the Hate"	Shane Embury	3:10
3.	"Forced to Fear"	Embury	3:34
4.	"Narcoleptic"	Greenway; Embury	2:28
5.	"Out of Sight Out of Mind"	Greenway; Harris	3:00
6.	"To Lower Yourself (Blind Servitude)"	Greenway; Embury	3:02
7.	"Lowest Common Denominator"	Greenway; Embury	3:19
8.	"Forewarned Is Disarmed?"	Greenway; Embury	2:25
9.	"Per Capita"	Greenway; Harris	2:54
10.	"Farce and Fiction"	Greenway; Jesse Pintado	2:47
11.	"Blows to the Body"	Greenway; Pintado	3:14
12.	"The Great Capitulator"	Greenway; Harris	11:35
Total length:			44:39

== Personnel ==
=== Napalm Death ===
- Mark "Barney" Greenway – lead vocals
- Mitch Harris – guitars, backing vocals
- Shane Embury – bass
- Danny Herrera – drums

=== Additional personnel ===
- Simon Efemey – engineering, mixing & mastering
- Russ Russell – engineering
- Will Bartle – engineering [Assisted at Chappel]
- Dan "Frank Crackfield" – engineer [Assisted at Parkgate]
- Jesse Pintado – music (10 & 11)

=== Album Design ===
- Mick Kenney – artwork [Image Manipulation], design [Front Cover]
- Mid (Rob Middleton) – artwork [Images Supplied]
- reesycle.com (Meurig Rees) – layout
