= Leaders Not Followers =

EP by Napalm Death
- Released: 25 October 1999
- Recorded: 21–24 July 1999
- Studio: Jacobs Studios, Surrey, England
- Genre: Deathgrind
- Length: 18:44
- Label: Dream Catcher, Secret
- Producer: Russ Russell, Simon Efemey

Napalm Death chronology
Words from the Exit Wound (1998)	Leaders Not Followers (1999)	The Complete Radio One Sessions (2000)

Professional ratings
Review scores
Source	Rating
AllMusic	3/5 stars
The Encyclopedia of Popular Music	2/5 stars
Kerrang!	4/5 stars
Metal Hammer	8/10

Leaders Not Followers is an EP album by the British band Napalm Death, featuring covers from various punk and metal bands. The EP has been re-issued by Secret Records on limited edition red vinyl on the occasion of Record Store Day 2013 and has also been included on their CD re-issue of Enemy of the Music Business as bonus tracks.

== Track listing ==
No.	Title	Original artist	Length
1.	"Politicians"	Raw Power	1:45
2.	"Incinerator"	Slaughter	3:21
3.	"Demoniac Possession"	Pentagram	3:13
4.	"Maggots in Your Coffin"	Repulsion	1:36
5.	"Back from the Dead"	Death	2:36
6.	"Nazi Punks Fuck Off"	Dead Kennedys	6:40

== Personnel ==
=== Napalm Death ===
- Mark "Barney" Greenway – vocals
- Jesse Pintado – guitar
- Mitch Harris – guitar
- Shane Embury – bass
- Danny Herrera – drums

=== Technical personnel ===
- Simon Efemey – production, engineering
- Russ Russell – production, engineering
- Mid – photo images

== See also ==
- Leaders Not Followers: Part 2
