= Simon Efemey =

British record producer

Simon Efemey is an English record producer and sound engineer, most noted for his work with metal and hard rock groups, including Napalm Death, Paradise Lost, Obituary, Amorphis, Deceased and The Wildhearts. He has also provided live sound mixing with bands including The Wonder Stuff, Jesus Jones, Diamond Head, Orson, Obituary and Napalm Death.

Efemey was instrumental in setting up the recording studio and rehearsal rooms in Stourbridge known as Wreckless and later on The Icehouse, providing a local source of affordable practice space and recording facilities for local amateur bands. During this time Efemey also participated in musical performances, fronting acts such as The Hellfire Club and The Stinkin’ Fish.

Efemey was the cover star of the withdrawn sleeve design for The Wildhearts' 1993 single "Greetings from Shitsville", on which he was depicted defecating into a pita bread held by the four band members.

== Discography ==
Efemey is credited as producer except where noted.

- Dead Wretched – No Hope For Anyone EP(Inferno Records)
- Ned's Atomic Dustbin – The Ingredients EP (1990, Chapter 22, 12")
- The Sand Kings – Circles (1990, Longbeach, Single)
- The Wonder Stuff – "Radio Ass Kiss" from The Size of a Cow 12" (1991, Polydor)
- Paradise Lost – As I Die (1992, Music For Nations)
- Paradise Lost – Shades of God (1992, Music For Nations) (producer, engineer, mix)
- The Wonder Stuff – Will the Circle be Unbroken from Welcome to the Cheap Seats EP (1992, Polydor)
- Cancer – Sins Of Mankind (1993, Vinyl Solution) (producer, engineer, mix)
- Diamond Head – Death and Progress (1993, Castle Music America) (engineer)
- Paradise Lost – Icon (1993, Metal Mind Records/1994, Music For Nations) (producer, engineer, mix)
- Wolfsbane – Massive Noise Injection (1993, Bronze)
- Wolfsbane – Massive Noise EP (1993, Bronze)
- Paradise Lost – Seals The Sense (1994, Music For Nations)
- The Wildhearts – "Caffeine Bomb" from Earth Vs The Wildhearts (1994, EastWest) (co-producer)
- Wolfsbane – Wolfsbane (1994, Bronze)
- Apes, Pigs & Spacemen – Transfusion (1995, Music For Nations)
- Cancer – Black Faith (1995, EastWest)
- Dearly Beheaded – In A Darkened Room (1995, Music For Nations)
- Helmet – "Complete" from the Johnny Mnemonic OST (1995, Columbia Records)
- Paradise Lost – Draconian Times (1995, Relativity/Music For Nations) (producer, mix)
- Paradise Lost – "The Last Time" (1995, Music For Nations)
- The Wildhearts – Five tracks from P.H.U.Q. (1995, EastWest)
- The Wildhearts Just In Lust EP (1995, EastWest)
- The Wishplants – Coma
- Crowbar – Broken Glass (1996, Pavement Music/2006, Candlelight USA)
- Hardware – Race, Religion & Hate (1996, Bulletproof/EMI Records)
- Pitchshifter – Infotainment? (1996, Earache Records)
- The Wildhearts – Two tracks from Fishing for Luckies (1996, Round Records) (mix)
- Apes, Pigs & Spacemen – Snapshot (1997, Music For Nations)
- Entwined – Dancing Under Glass (1998, Earache Records) (producer)
- Pantera – Nosatsu Live (engineer)
- Paradise Lost – Eight tracks from Reflection (1998, Music For Nations)
- RAMP – Evolution, Devolution, Revolution (1998)
- Amorphis – Tuonela (1999, Nuclear Blast)
- Meathook Seed – Basic Instructions Before Leaving Earth (B.I.B.L.E.) (1999, Dreamcatcher Records) (producer, mix)
- Napalm Death – Leaders Not Followers (1999, Dreamcatcher Records)
- INHUMAN – Foreshadow (1998, Uniao Lisboa)
- Deceased – Supernatural Addiction (2000, Relapse Records) (producer, keyboards on one track)
- Love Like Blood – Enslaved + Condemned (2000, Hall of Sermon) (producer, mix, mastering)
- Napalm Death – Enemy of the Music Business (2000, Dreamcatcher Records)
- Area 54 – No Visible Scars (2000, Dreamcatcher Records) (mix)
- Amorphis – Alone (2001, Spinefarm Records)
- Amorphis – Am Universum (2001, Spinefarm Records) (producer, engineer)
- Defenestration – One Inch God (2001, Dreamcatcher Records)
- Napalm Death – Order of the Leech (2002, Feto Records/2003, Spitfire Records)
- The Wildhearts – Riff After Riff After Motherfucking Riff (2002, Japanese import)
- Amorphis – Six tracks from Chapters (2003, Relapse Records)
- The Exploited – Fuck the System (2003, Dreamcatcher Records)
- Napalm Death – Leaders Not Followers: Part 2 (2004, Century Media) (engineer)
- The Wildhearts – Tracks from Riff After Riff (2004, Gearhead Records)
- Deceased – Supernatural Addiction/Behind the Mourner's Veil (2005, Relapse Records)
- Skullshifter – Here in Hell (2005, self-released) (mix)
- Orson – "Everything" and "Jesse" from No Tomorrow EP (2006, Universal Records)
- Orson – "Happiness" single (2006, Universal) (engineer)
- Blacklight Pioneer – Tracks (2012) (producer)
- The Arbour Doves – Album (2013) (producer)
- The Wonder Stuff – 30 Goes Around the Sun, Album (2016)
- Solitary - The Diseased Heart Of Society, Album (2017)
- The Wonder Stuff – Upstaged, Album (Mix) (2018)
- Cancer – Shadow Gripped (Peaceville Records) Album (2018)
- The Wonder Stuff - Better Being Lucky, Album (2019)
- Absolute Power- Absolute Power, (Feto Records) Album (2020)
- Solitary- The Truth Behind The Lies, Album (2020)
- Sweet Crisis, Tricks On My Mind, Album (2021)
- Venemous Concept, The Good Ship Lollipop,(Graphite Records) Album (2023)
- Solitary - Embrace The Darkness, Album (2024)
