= Jesse Pintado =

Mexican-American guitarist (1969–2006)

- Birth name: Jesus Ernesto Pintado Andrade
- Born: July 12, 1969
- Origin: Empalme, Sonora, Mexico
- Died: August 27, 2006 (aged 37); Rotterdam, Netherlands
- Genres: Grindcore, death metal
- Occupation: Guitarist
- Years active: 1985–2006
- Formerly of: Terrorizer, Napalm Death, Lock Up, Brujeria

Jesus "Jesse" Ernesto Pintado Andrade (July 12, 1969 – August 27, 2006) was a Mexican-American guitarist best known as a guitarist for the British grindcore band Napalm Death.

== Biography ==
Pintado was born in Empalme, Sonora, Mexico and moved to the US at an early age. He lived in Huntington Park, California but moved to Birmingham, England after he joined Napalm Death.

Pintado started in the grindcore band Terrorizer where he recorded the album World Downfall, the first album to feature Pete Sandoval who would later leave the band to join Morbid Angel.

Pintado joined Napalm Death in 1989, where he replaced guitarist Bill Steer immediately prior to the recording of their album Harmony Corruption.

In 2004, he officially left Napalm Death; instead of replacing him, the band has since continued as a four-piece. Pintado later revived Terrorizer, recruiting Tony Norman of Monstrosity and Anthony Rezhawk of Resistant Culture; he and Pete Sandoval were the only original members.

Besides Terrorizer and Napalm Death he also played in Lock Up and Brujeria. Both bands also featured Napalm Death bass player Shane Embury.

Pintado died in 2006 at Erasmus MC hospital in Rotterdam, Netherlands of liver failure.

== Discography ==
=== Napalm Death ===
==== Studio albums ====
- Harmony Corruption (1990)
- Utopia Banished (1992)
- Fear, Emptiness, Despair (1994)
- Diatribes (1996)
- Inside the Torn Apart (1997)
- Words from the Exit Wound (1998)
- Enemy of the Music Business (2000)

Pintado was also credited for Order of the Leech and Leaders Not Followers: Part 2, however, he did not actually appear on these records.

==== Singles and EPs ====
- Harmony Corruption bonus live EP (EP, 1990)
- Mass Appeal Madness (EP, MOSH46 1991)
- The World Keeps Turning (EP, MOSH65 1992)
- Nazi Punks Fuck Off (EP, MOSH92 1993)
- Hung (EP, 1994)
- More Than Meets the Eye (Promo, 1994)
- Plague Rages (Promo, 1994)
- Greed Killing (EP, 1995)
- Cursed to Tour (split with At the Gates, 1996)
- In Tongues We Speak (split-CD with Coalesce) (MOSH168 1997)
- Breed to Breathe (EP, 1997)
- Leaders Not Followers (EP, 1999)

==== Napalm Death-only compilation albums ====
- Death by Manipulation (MOSH51, Earache 1992)
- The Peel Sessions (1993)
- The Complete Radio One Sessions (2000)
- Noise for Music's Sake (MOSH266, Earache 2003)

==== Live albums ====
- The Peel Sessions (1989)
- Live Corruption (1990)
- Bootlegged in Japan (1998)
- Punishment in Capitals (2002, CD)

==== DVDs and VHS ====
- Live Corruption (VHS, 1991)
- The DVD (DVD, 2001)
- Punishment in Capitals (DVD, 2002)

=== Terrorizer ===
==== Studio albums ====
- World Downfall (1989)
- Darker Days Ahead (2006)

==== Compilation albums ====
- From the Tomb (2003)
- Before the Downfall (2014)

=== Nausea LA ===
==== Single ====
- "Psychological Conflict" (1991)

Pintado was credited as songwriting (assistant)

=== Lock Up ===
==== Studio albums ====
- Pleasures Pave Sewers (CD, 1999)
- Hate Breeds Suffering (CD, 2002)

=== Resistant Culture ===
==== Studio albums ====
- Welcome to Reality (CD, 2005)

==== Live albums ====
- Live in Japan (CD, 2005)

=== Brujeria ===
==== Studio album ====
- Brujerizmo (CD, 2000)

==== Compilation albums ====
- Mextremist! Greatest Hits (Kool Arrow Records, 2001)
- The Mexecutioner! - The Best of Brujeria (Roadrunner Records, 2003)
- The Singles (2006)
