= Enemy of the Music Business =

Studio album by Napalm Death
- Released: 25 September 2000
- Recorded: 26 May 2000–8 June 2000, Parkgate Studios, England
- Genre: Grindcore
- Length: 45:31
- Label: Spitfire
- Producer: Simon Efemey, Russ Russell

Napalm Death chronology
The Complete Radio One Sessions (2000)	Enemy of the Music Business (2000)	The DVD (2001)

Professional ratings
Review scores
Source	Rating
AllMusic	4/5 stars
Chronicles of Chaos	9.5/10
Collector's Guide to Heavy Metal	7/10
The Encyclopedia of Popular Music	3/5 stars
Kerrang!	5/5 stars
Metal Hammer	9/10

Enemy of the Music Business is the ninth studio album by the British band Napalm Death, released in 2000. This album, along with Words from the Exit Wound, are the only Napalm Death studio albums that were released only on CD until 2013. London-based Secret Records has re-issued the album on CD (with covers EP Leaders Not Followers included as bonus tracks) and 180g LP. This is the last release that has Jesse Pintado actually performing. Kerrang put it on the list of the best 50 albums of the 2000, at the position number 19.

== Track listing ==
No.	Title	Writer(s)	Length
1.	"Taste the Poison"	Shane Embury; Mark "Barney" Greenway	1:49
2.	"Next on the List"	Embury; Greenway	3:36
3.	"Constitutional Hell"	Jesse Pintado; Greenway	2:36
4.	"Vermin"	Mitch Harris; Greenway	2:17
5.	"Volume of Neglect"	Harris	3:20
6.	"Thanks for Nothing"	Embury; Harris	2:44
7.	"Can’t Play, Won’t Pay"	Embury; Greenway	3:25
8.	"Blunt Against the Cutting Edge"	Harris; Greenway	3:03
9.	"Cure for the Common Complaint"	Embury; Pintado; Greenway	2:43
10.	"Necessary Evil"	Embury; Harris	2:56
11.	"C.S. (Conservative Shithead) Part 2"	Embury; Greenway	2:18
12.	"Mechanics of Deceit"	Embury	3:21
13.	"(The Public Get) What the Public Doesn’t Want"	Embury; Pintado	3:14
14.	"Fracture in the Equation"	Pintado; Greenway	11:09
Total length:			45:31

== CD Re-issue bonus tracks listing (Leaders Not Followers EP) ==
No.	Title	Length
1.	"Politicians" (Raw Power cover)	1:45
2.	"Incinerator" (Slaughter cover)	3:21
3.	"Demoniac Possession" (Pentagram cover)	3:13
4.	"Maggots in Your Coffin" (Repulsion cover)	1:36
5.	"Back from the Dead" (Death cover)	2:36
6.	"Nazi Punks Fuck Off" (Dead Kennedys cover)	6:40

== Notes ==
Tracks number 7 and 13 are misspelled as "Cant Play Wont Pay" and "(The Public Get) What The Public Doesn't Want" in the back of the album. "Taste The Poison" is credited as "Take The Poison" in the booklet.

"Fracture in the Equation" lasts 3:46. At the end of the song, there is a long silence block from 3:46 to 9:54 and, after that, a secret soundbite comes fading in of a fan introducing himself, just like in the Leaders Not Followers EP and Order of the Leech.

== Personnel ==
=== Napalm Death ===
- Mark "Barney" Greenway – vocals
- Jesse Pintado – guitar
- Mitch Harris – guitar
- Shane Embury – bass
- Danny Herrera – drums

=== Technical personnel ===
- Simon Efemey – production
- Russ Russell – production
- Saša Janković – engineering
- Kevin Metcalf – mastering
- MID – cover artwork
- Duncan Bullimore – design, additional artwork
