= Apes, Pigs & Spacemen =

British rock band

weston,Xander,Kayden
- Origin: Derby, England
- Genres: Rock
- Years active: 1993–present
- Labels: Music for Nations, Phat Monkey
- Members: Paul Miro; Bart; Adam Goldsmith; Cain Paisley
- Past members: Kettle; Sam Carr; Laurie Jenkins; Milly Evans; Tom Meadows

Apes, Pigs & Spacemen (a.k.a. AP&S) are a British rock band formed in Derby in 1993.

== History ==
The band initially comprised Paul Miro (vocals), Kettle (guitar) aka Martin Chaisson, real name Martin Smith formerly of Waysted, UFO, If Only and now a music producer/composer, Bart (bass guitar), and Sam Carr (drums). The band was originally called Sacred Cow but changed their name to AP & S around 1993 - 1994. The band explained their new name: "An advanced life form came to Earth and mated with what we consider a lower life-form, an ape. The offspring became what we now call humanity...we're now growing organs in pigs for the purpose of being transplanted into humans and eat pigs, one of our closest genetic relatives," although this was not a theory that band believed. The band signed to the Music for Nations label and released their debut EP, Antiseptic, in November 1994. After a second EP the band released their debut album, Transfusion, in October 1995. All of their recordings for Music For Nations were produced by Simon Efemey.

During 1994 and 1996, Apes, Pigs & Spacemen (AP&S) toured extensively across the UK and Europe, playing with numerous bands, including Warrior Soul, Skid Row, The Wildhearts, Monster Magnet and Freak of Nature.

Kettle left the band before work started on the second album, and Miro took over guitar duties. Due to family commitments, drummer, Sam Carr also quit the band during pre-production work on the second album, and was replaced by Laurie Jenkins, with whom Miro had worked on other musical projects. The second album, Snapshot, was released, with a negligible amount of publicity, in June 1997. With no label support, the band financed an independent UK tour before entering into a protracted period of contractual and legal problems.

In 2005, founder members Paul Miro and Bart released a self-financed AP&S album, Free Pawn. They played a handful of UK dates to coincide with the album's release, with Milly Evans on guitar and Tom Meadows on drums. Between 2005-2007, four limited edition EPs Monkey Mettle, Simple Simian, Dirty Monkey, and Fives, were also released via the band's website.

Without finance, the band have continually sought to find ways to release AP&S material. Miro has released four solo albums, Earthly Powers (2007), B.O.A.T.S. (Based on a True Story) (2009), All Stripped Down (a six-album acoustic collection, released 2009), and the pledge-funded Sometimes You Get, Sometimes You Get Got (2012) and produces music for film, radio and television.

Their self-released collection, Ape-ology, was released in 2015.

== Discography ==
=== Albums ===
- Transfusion (1995), Music for Nations
- Snapshot (1997), Music for Nations
- Free Pawn (2005), Phat Monkey
- Ape-ology (2015), self-released

Compilations

- Seven (2006), Music for Nations - tracks from the two EPs

=== EPs ===
- Antiseptic (1994), Music for Nations
- Safety Net (1995), Music for Nations
- Monkey Mettle (2006) Phat Monkey
- Simple Simian (2006) Phat Monkey
- Dirty Monkey (2007) Phat Monkey
- Fives (2007) Phat Monkey
