= Harmony Corruption =

Album by Napalm Death

Studio album by Napalm Death
- Released: 30 July 1990 (Europe) 7 December 1990 (US)
- Recorded: April–May 1990
- Studios: Morrisound, Tampa, Florida, US
- Genre: Death metal
- Length: 41:02
- Labels: Earache; Combat (US)
- Producers: Scott Burns; Napalm Death

Napalm Death chronology
Mentally Murdered (1989)	Harmony Corruption (1990)	Mass Appeal Madness (1991)

Singles from Harmony Corruption
- 1. "Suffer the Children" Released: 13 August 1990

Harmony Corruption is the third studio album by British grindcore band Napalm Death. It was released in the UK by Earache Records on 30 July 1990 and in the United States by Combat Records on 7 December 1990. This is the first album by the band recorded as a five piece.

== Background and recording ==
Notably, it was recorded in the spring of 1990 at Morrisound Recording in Tampa, Florida, where many classic death metal albums were recorded. It is the first Napalm Death album to feature Mark "Barney" Greenway as the vocalist and Americans Mitch Harris and Jesse Pintado as guitarists, and the last with Mick Harris on drums. Greenway tracked all of his vocals in one day while stoned on marijuana. The band members slept on the couch at the Morbid Angel house during the album's recording. Guitarist Mitch Harris recalled the process: "We spent five days a week for two solid months, learning, practicing the songs upside down inside out without a penny to our names, in a different country, all alone, but we had each other." Additionally, members of prominent Florida Death Metal bands Glen Benton (of Deicide) and John Tardy (of Obituary) were guest vocalists for the song "Unfit Earth".

== Release history ==
Harmony Corruption was the band's third UK chart entry, peaking at number 67. Richard Johnson, a member of Agoraphobic Nosebleed, says that the wide distribution of Harmony Corruption ensured that it had a greater impact on the American grindcore scene than earlier Napalm Death efforts.

The track "Suffer the Children" was released as single on vinyl and CD, which features the non-album tracks "Siege of Power" and "Harmony Corruption". A video was made for "Suffer the Children". Additionally, limited vinyl pressings included the bonus LP with a live performance recorded at I.C.A.

The tracks from the Mentally Murdered EP, are included at the end of early editions of the CD, though versions now in print feature only the standard eleven tracks.

In 2012, Earache Records released a remastered edition, containing bonus tracks.

== Music ==
Harmony Corruption has been characterized by its "sluggish rhythms and a generally sludgy sound." According to music journalist T Coles, the album "makes a clear effort to be structured, naturally bringing their style closer to the bands in the Florida scene" and introduces a "tighter architecture to their berserk style." Described as a stylistic "handbrake turn" for the band, the album represents a shift in genre from grindcore to "standard death metal", featuring technical riffs and deep low vocals. The tracks have been called "full-fledged songs [...] not start-stop eruptions of noise" and "straightforward death metal songs, not grindcore blasts." The album has been described as "more expansive" than its predecessors, which have been called "one- or two-minute grindcore blasts." According to Phil Freeman of Stereogum: "The primitivism of the early albums is still there, just spread across a slightly broader canvas."

The guitar work between Pintado and Harris has been described as "varied and intricate" compared to that of Bill Steer, their predecessor in the band, whose style was described as a "frenzied, distorted blur."

== Artwork ==
Guitarist Mitch Harris retrospectively described the album's cover artwork as "medio-CORE."

== Reception and legacy ==
Professional ratings
Review scores
Source	Rating
AllMusic	2.5/5 stars
Collector's Guide to Heavy Metal	5/10
The Encyclopedia of Popular Music	1/5 stars
Entertainment Weekly	C
Select	4/5 medals
Spin Alternative Record Guide	6/10

The album was met with a polarized reception upon release and has continued to divide listeners. Decibel described the album as, "a milestone in extreme music history." Conversely, AllMusic described the album as, "a bit of a novel album for the band, though one that's not especially remarkable in the big picture."

Shane Embury has said of the album's reception, "it turned a lot of people on to the band who I guess had never given us the time of day, but also turned old-school fans off. Being young at the time and seeing the reactions was kind of scary; as you get older, opinions matter less, but it captured the time. Over in the states it has the same nostalgia as Scum. We will always have to play 'Suffer the Children.'"

In 2015, Phil Freeman of Stereogum ranked Harmony Corruption as the worst Napalm Death album, saying: "There are no bad Napalm Death records. [...] But Napalm Death were never meant to be Malevolent Creation, and it's a good thing this orthodox death metal version of the band only lasted one album."

== Track listing ==
No.	Title	Lyrics	Music	Length
1.	"Vision Conquest"	Shane Embury	Embury	2:42
2.	"If the Truth Be Known"	Embury; Mark Greenway	Embury	4:12
3.	"Inner Incineration"	Embury	Jesse Pintado	2:57
4.	"Malicious Intent"	Embury	Embury	3:26
5.	"Unfit Earth"	Greenway	Mick Harris	5:03
6.	"Circle of Hypocrisy"	Greenway	Mick Harris	3:15
7.	"The Chains that Bind Us"	Embury; Greenway	Mick Harris	4:08
8.	"Mind Snare"	Greenway	Mitch Harris	3:42
9.	"Extremity Retained"	Greenway	Mick Harris	2:01
10.	"Suffer the Children"	Greenway	Mick Harris	4:21

CD bonus track
No.	Title	Lyrics	Music	Length
11.	"Hiding Behind"	Greenway	Mick Harris	5:15

Live at the I.C.A. London 29 June 1990
No.	Title	Lyrics	Music	Length
1.	"Rise Above"	Lee Dorrian	Embury
2.	"Success?"	Jim Whitely
3.	"From Enslavement to Obliteration"
4.	"Control"	Justin Broadrick	Justin Broadrick
5.	"Walls of Confinement"	Dorrian	Mick Harris
6.	"Instinct of Survival"	Broadrick	Justin Broadrick
7.	"Siege of Power"	Broadrick
8.	"Avalanche Master Song" (Godflesh cover)	Godflesh	Godflesh
9.	"You Suffer?"	Broadrick	Nick Bullen
10.	"Deceiver"	Whitely

== Personnel ==
=== Napalm Death ===
- Mark "Barney" Greenway – vocals
- Jesse Pintado – guitars
- Mitch Harris – guitars
- Shane Embury – bass
- Mick Harris – drums

=== Additional musicians ===
- Glen Benton – backing vocals (5)
- John Tardy – backing vocals (5)

=== Technical personnel ===
- David Windmill – artwork
- Tim Hubbard – photography
- Noel Summerville – mastering

== Chart positions ==
Chart (1990)	Peak position
UK Albums (Official Charts)	67
