= Napalm Death =

English grindcore band

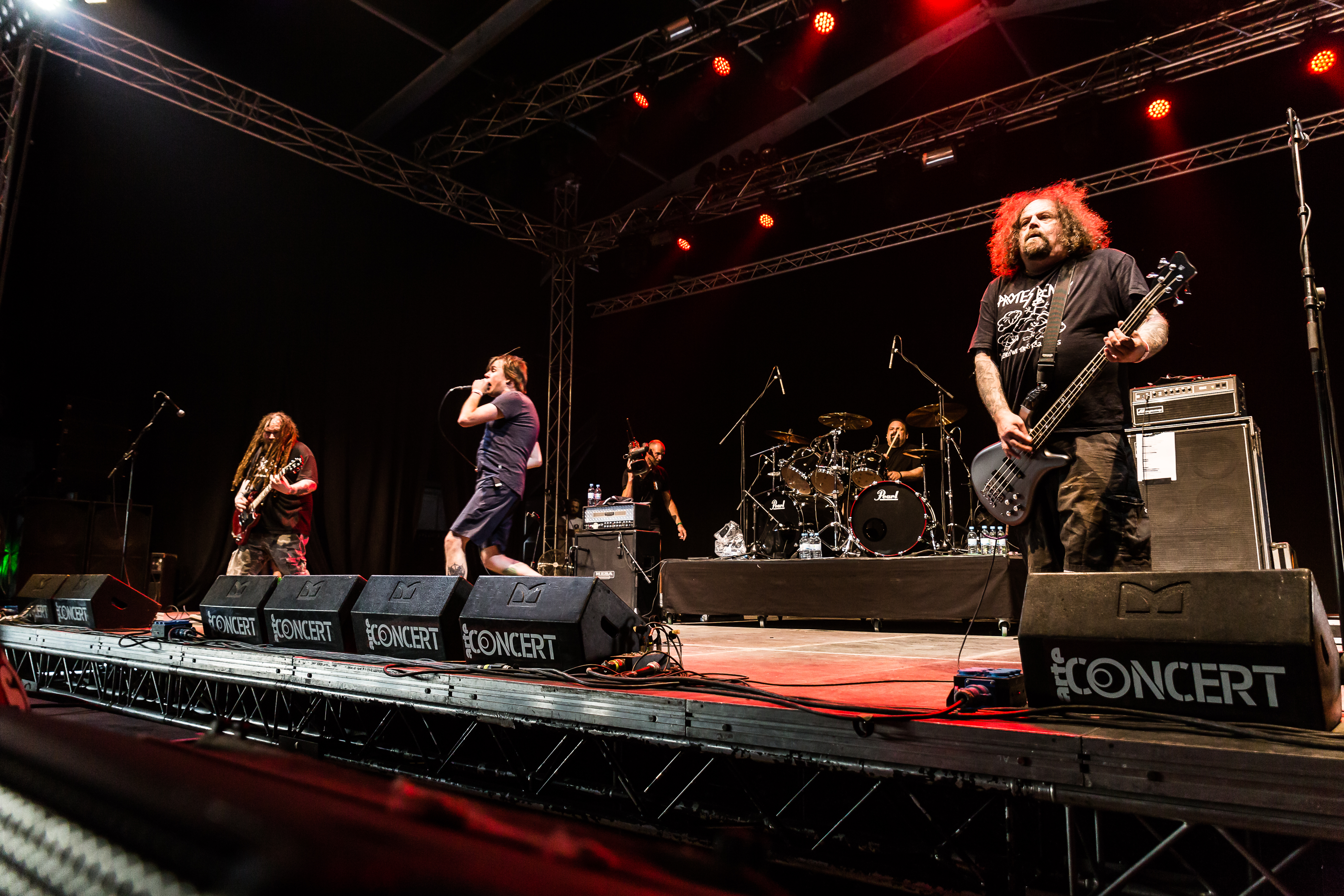
- Napalm Death performing in 2019

Background information
- Origin: Meriden, West Midlands, England
- Genres: Grindcore; death metal; crust punk; anarcho-punk (early)
- Works: Discography
- Years active: 1981–present
- Labels: Century Media; Spitfire; Earache; Columbia; Combat; Relativity; Dream Catcher; FETO; Snapper; Peaceville; Ipecac
- Spinoffs: Brujeria; Cathedral; Lock Up; Carcass
- Members: Shane Embury; Barney Greenway; Danny Herrera; John Cooke
- Past members: List
- Website: napalmdeath.org

Napalm Death are an English grindcore band formed in Meriden, West Midlands, in 1981. The band currently consists of bassist Shane Embury, drummer Danny Herrera, lead vocalist Barney Greenway and guitarist John Cooke. None of the founding band members remain in the band. From 1989 to 2004, Napalm Death were a five-piece band after they added Jesse Pintado and Mitch Harris as replacements for guitarist Bill Steer. Following Pintado's departure, the band reverted to a four-piece. Mitch Harris left the band in 2014 to focus on his personal life. Since Mitch's indefinite hiatus, guitarist John Cooke can be seen on guitar during live shows.

The band is credited as pioneers of the grindcore genre by incorporating elements of crust punk and death metal, using a noise-filled sound that uses distorted, down-tuned guitars, grinding overdrive bass, high-speed tempo, blast beats, vocals that consist of incomprehensible growls or high-pitched shrieks, extremely short songs, and sociopolitical lyrics. After hiring drummer Mick Harris in 1985, the band gained immense speed and started pushing the limits of how fast drums can be played. The band's debut album Scum, released in 1987 by Earache Records, proved substantially influential throughout the global metal and punk communities. By their third album Harmony Corruption (1990), the band shifted to death metal and began writing longer and more complex songs. In 1991, the other members of Napalm Death fired Mick Harris due to him not being able to play as fast and personality differences. Mick Harris is often seen as the popularizer of the blast beat.

Napalm Death have released sixteen studio albums, and as of 2003 are listed by Nielsen SoundScan as the seventh-best-selling death metal band in the United States. According to former vocalist Lee Dorrian, Scum and From Enslavement to Obliteration (1988) have sold a combined total of 400,000 copies worldwide. In 2016, the staff of Loudwire named them the 26th best metal band of all time.

== History ==
=== Early history (1981–1986) ===
Napalm Death were formed in the village of Meriden near Coventry, in the United Kingdom, in May 1981 by Nic Bullen and Miles Ratledge while the duo were still in their early teenage years. The duo had been playing in amateur bands since 1980 as an extension of their fanzine writing, and went through a number of names (including "Civil Defence", "The Mess", "Evasion", "Undead Hatred" and "Sonic Noise") before deciding on Napalm Death in mid 1981. The band were initially inspired by the early wave of punk bands, particularly the anarcho-punk movement (a subgenre of punk music focused on anarchist politics), and associated groups such as Crass.

The first stable line-up of the group consisted of Nicholas Bullen on bass and lead vocals, Simon Oppenheimer on guitars, and Miles Ratledge on drums, and lasted from December 1981 to January 1982. Graham Robertson joined on bass in January 1982. Simon Oppenheimer left the group in August 1982 and was replaced by Darryl Fedeski who left the group in October 1982: at this point, Graham Robertson began to play guitar and Finbarr Quinn (ex-Curfew) joined on bass and backing vocals. The group played concerts throughout 1982 (playing their first concert on 25 July 1982 at Atherstone Miners Club) and 1983 (sharing billing with anarcho-punk groups such as Amebix, The Apostles and Antisect), and made four demo recordings in 1982 and 1983, one of which contributed their first released recording to the Bullshit Detector Volume 3 compilation released by Crass Records in 1984.

Cover for the Hatred Surge demo recording from 1985; from left-right: Justin Broadrick, Nicholas Bullen, Mick Harris

The band entered a period of hiatus from the end of 1983 onwards, playing only one concert in 1984 (a benefit for striking mine workers) with additional vocalist Marian Williams (ex-Relevant POS, and sister of the drummer of the group Human Cabbages from Coventry, UK). During this period, Nic Bullen met Justin Broadrick, a guitarist from Birmingham with whom he shared an interest in the music of bands such as Killing Joke, Throbbing Gristle, Crass, Amebix, Swans, and the developing power electronics scene. Bullen joined Broadrick's Final project for a period in 1983.

In July 1985, Napalm Death briefly reformed in order to appear at a concert at the Mermaid in Birmingham which was also notable as the last concert by Final. The group consisted of a four-piece line-up of Miles Ratledge on drums; Bullen - performing vocals, bass and guitar; Graham Robertson on guitar and bass, and Damien Errington on guitar. After this concert, Miles Ratledge and Bullen asked Broadrick to join Napalm Death as guitarist, with Bullen as vocalist and bass player. The band began to develop a musical style which blended elements of post-punk (particularly Killing Joke and Amebix), heavy hardcore punk in the vein of Discharge, and thrash metal (with particular reference to Possessed and extreme metal group Celtic Frost).

The group played their first concert as a trio on 31 August 1985 (playing two concerts on the same day: Telford with Chumbawamba and Blyth Power, and Birmingham with We've Got a Fuzzbox and We're Gonna Use It), and began to play regularly in the Birmingham area (particularly at The Mermaid public house in the Sparkhill area of Birmingham) with a wide range of musicians including Icons of Filth, Concrete Sox, The Varukers, Indecent Assault, Decadence Within, and The Groundhogs.

In September 1985, Peter Shaw joined on bass. The four-piece line-up recorded Hatred Surge (the band's fifth demo recording) on 23 October 1985 which the band made available at their concerts and by mail. Following the recording of the demo, Bullen and Broadrick wished to extend their exploration of a more extreme musical style which created a split in the group with Ratledge: as a result, the group splintered and Mick Harris (a local fan) was asked to join as drummer in December 1985.

The trio – Bullen on vocals and bass, Broadrick on guitar and Harris on drums – made their first performance on 15 December 1985 and went on to play many concerts in 1986, predominantly in the Birmingham area, with musicians such as Amebix, Antisect, Chaos UK, Varukers, Disorder and Dirge. The group recorded a sixth demo, From Enslavement to Obliteration, on 15 March 1986, which the group made available at their concerts and through mail, before making a seventh recording later that year, Scum, which was provisionally intended to form part of a split LP with the English hardcore band Atavistic on Manic Ears Records. This recording later became the first side of the band's debut album Scum in 1987.

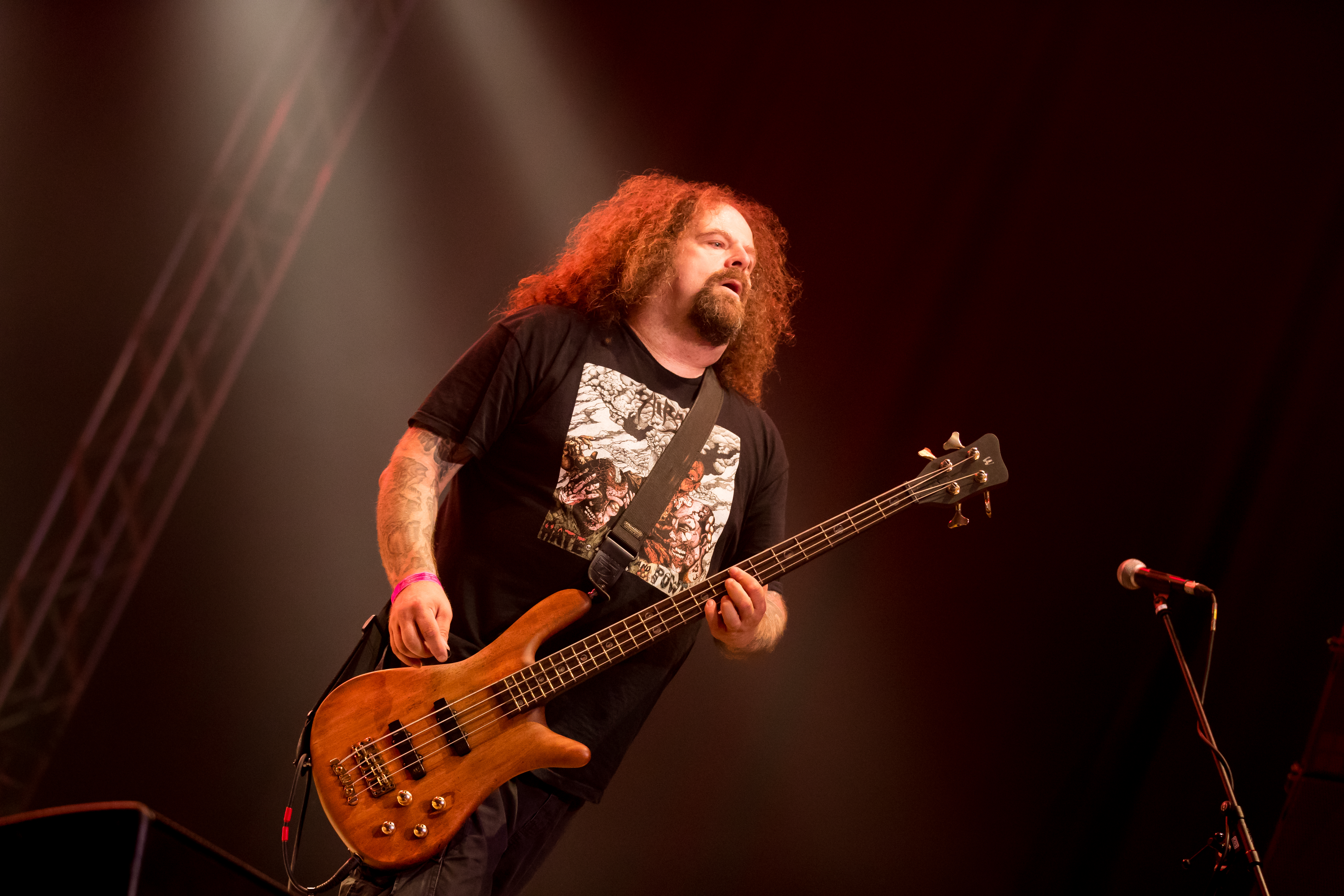
Embury in 2017

The band then faced a number of line-up changes. Nic Bullen was becoming frustrated with the musical direction of the group, and began to lose interest as a whole: as a result, Jim Whiteley was asked to join as bass player. The band played a number of concerts as a four-piece before Justin Broadrick left the group to play drums for local band Head of David. The group attempted to find a new guitarist by asking Shane Embury (ex-Unseen Terror and a fan of the group) to join and giving a trial period to Frank Healy (ex-Annihilator, later of Cerebral Fix and Sacrilege). After Broadrick's departure, Nic Bullen's dissatisfaction with the musical direction of the group led him to leave the group in December 1986 (in order to focus on his studies in English Literature and Philosophy at university), leaving the group without any of its original members.

=== Scum and From Enslavement to Obliteration (1987–1989) ===
External videos
- Napalm Death live in Germany, 1987 YouTube, authorised by Earache Records.

With the departure of Broadrick and Bullen, the remaining members started looking for people who could fill in the roles. Guitarist Bill Steer played in a death metal band based in Liverpool called Carcass, and given the affinity between the two, he joined Napalm Death while still playing an active role in the former. They had also asked another friend, Coventrian Lee Dorrian, to join as vocalist due to his good relationship with the group, even though he had never been in a band before. This line-up recorded the B side of the Scum LP at Rich Bitch studios in early May 1987, and the album was released through Earache Records.

The band promptly lost another member just after they undertook a short tour after the release of Scum. Jim Whiteley left the group (and subsequently joined Weston-Super-Mare based band Ripcord with whom the aforementioned tour had been shared) and Shane Embury (former drummer of Unseen Terror) moved to bass. The band then appeared on two compilation records ('North Atlantic Noise Attack' and the 'Pathological Compilation'), recorded two Peel sessions and a split 7-inch with Japanese band S.O.B. They also returned to Rich Bitch studio once more and recorded their second album: From Enslavement to Obliteration. This was a pioneering album both in terms of vocal technique and the high speed of instrumental performance.

A follow-up release to From Enslavement to Obliteration came in the form of the six song 12-inch EP "Mentally Murdered", which was to be the last recording with the Harris/Steer/Dorrian/Embury line-up. This EP was recorded at the Slaughterhouse Studios and took on a slightly different sound, blending grindcore with death metal. Following the release, Napalm Death were featured on national television in the United Kingdom in a heavy metal special by Arena (BBC 2).

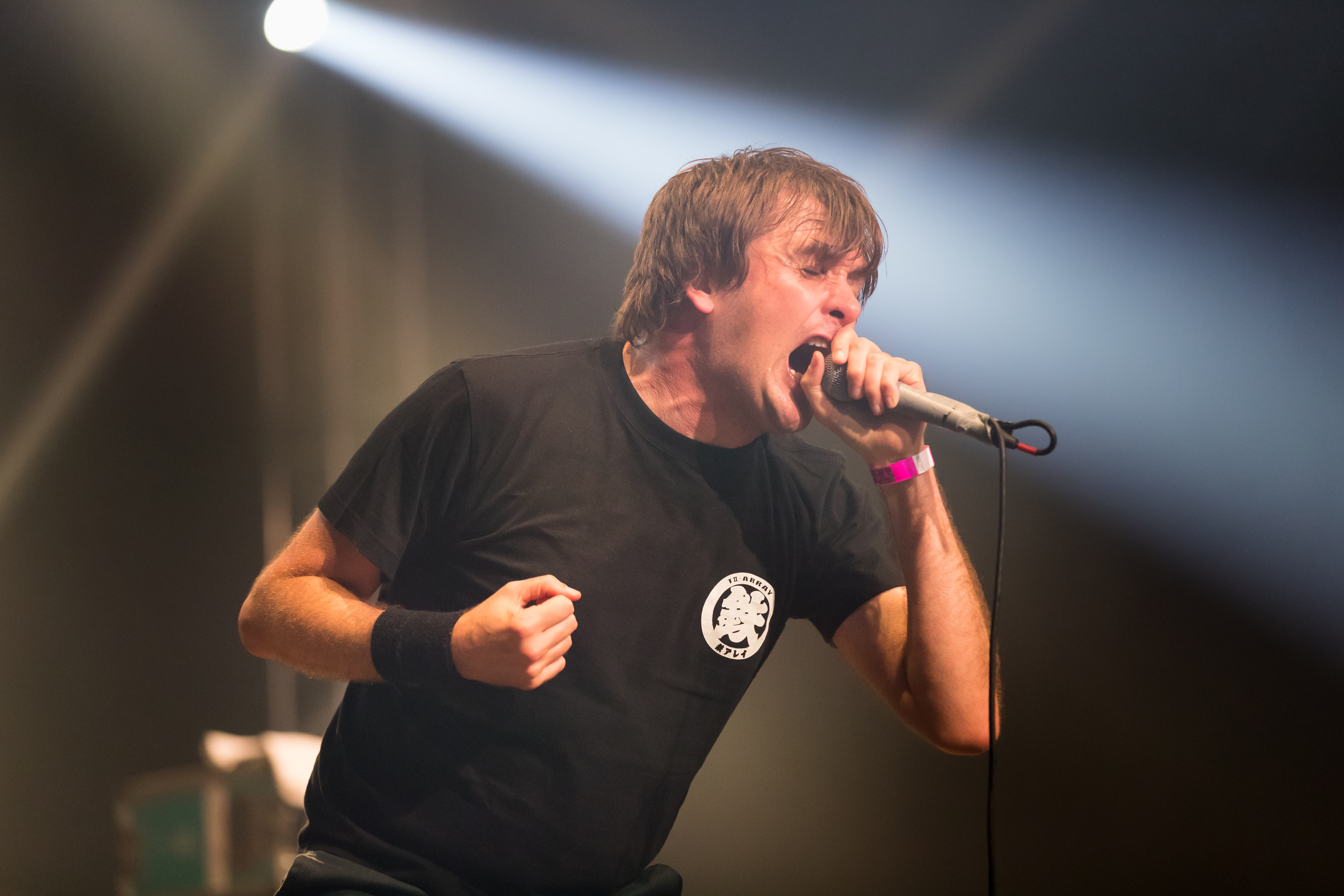
Barney Greenway in 2017

The band continued to tour, but as soon as they came back home from Japan, in July 1989, Steer and Dorrian left the band: Steer decided to dedicate himself full-time to Carcass, while Dorrian formed the doom metal group Cathedral. The group recruited Jesse Pintado (ex-Terrorizer) on guitar and Mark "Barney" Greenway (ex-Benediction) as vocalist. This line-up took part in the Grindcrusher tour organised by Earache Records and featured fellow label-mates Carcass, Bolt Thrower and Florida's Morbid Angel. The group recruited Mitch Harris (ex-Righteous Pigs) as second guitarist after the tour.

=== Rise to success (1990–1994) ===
In Florida, the group began work on Harmony Corruption. Corruption saw stylistic changes from the band. It exhibited stronger influence from death metal by incorporating blast beats and slower tempos. Following the record's release, Live Corruption, a live recording of the band's 30 June 1990 performance at the Salisbury Arts Centre, was released in 1992.

Negative fan reactions to Corruption and accusations of selling out, compelled the band to reconsider its stylistic changes. The group entered Eddie Van Dale's Violent Noise Experience Club in March 1991 to record six new tracks. The songs produced by this session and released on the "Mass Appeal Madness" 12-inch EP exhibited a much more "raw" quality, again finding favour with fans. This recording, along with the "Mentally Murdered" 12-inch, the split 7-inch with S.O.B. and live tracks from Live Corruption, were released on Death by Manipulation.

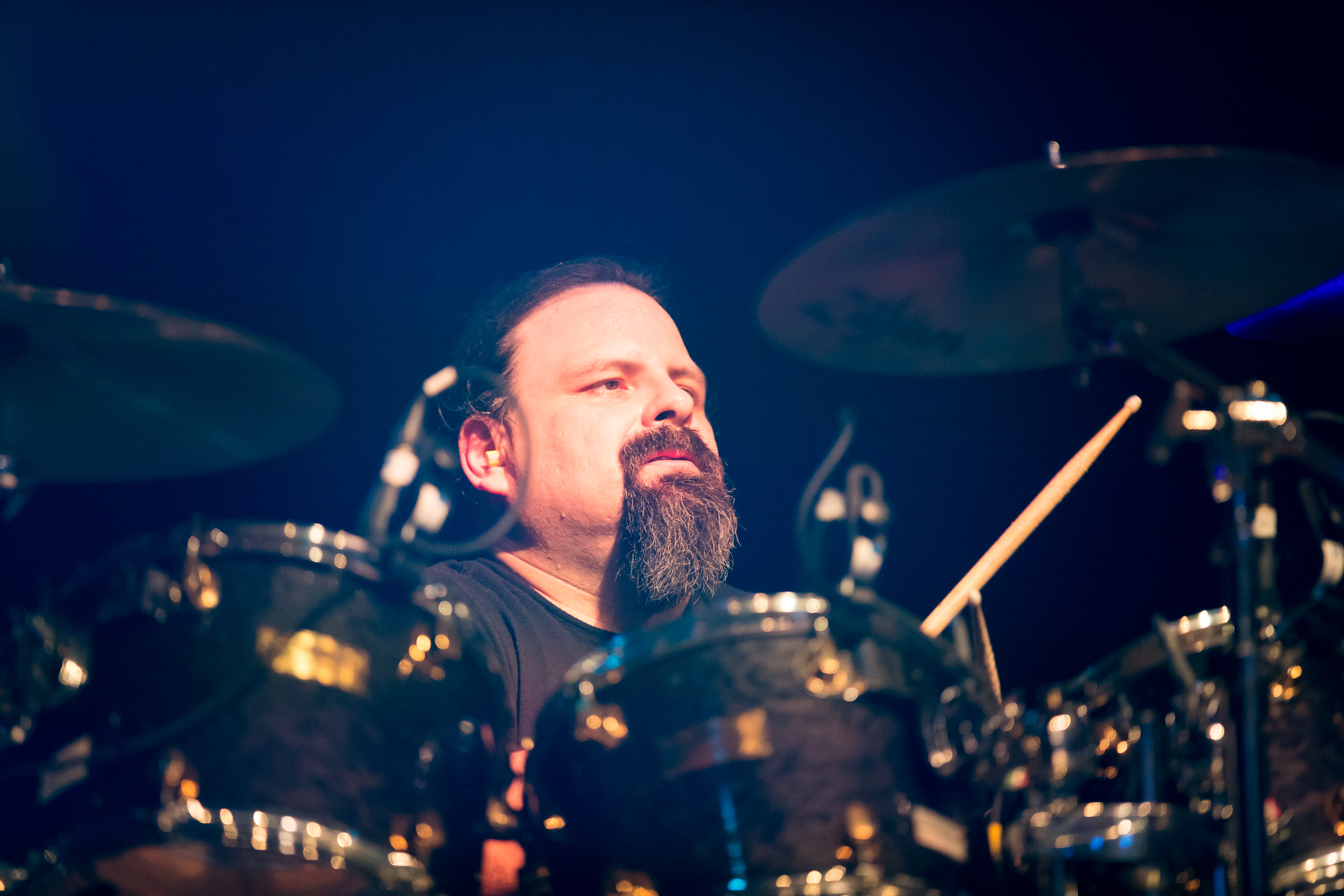
Herrera in 2017

Drummer Mick Harris—the only remaining member of the Scum line-up—eventually left Napalm Death due to creative differences regarding stylistic direction. In April 1991, Harris recorded Guts of a Virgin, the debut album for Painkiller, along with John Zorn and Bill Laswell. Harris later recalled the Guts sessions were when he decided to leave Napalm Death and explore different genres of music. Danny Herrera, a close friend of Jesse Pintado, was brought in as the new drummer. Herrera's drumming style has been noted for its uniqueness; it has been described as "Euroblast", a variant of blast beat in which simultaneous eighth notes are played on the ride cymbal and kick drum, with alternate eighth notes added on the snare drum. The addition of Herrera would be the last major line-up change of the band save for Jesse Pintado's departure in 2004, which returned the band to a quartet configuration.

Napalm Death released the album Utopia Banished in 1992, produced by Colin Richardson. Stylistically, the album was described as a "return to the roots" form of grindcore. After recording The World Keeps Turning EP, the band toured Europe with Dismember and Obituary on the "Campaign for Musical Destruction" tour. They then toured the US with Sepultura, Sacred Reich and Sick of It All.

Napalm Death toured the US with Carcass, Cathedral and Brutal Truth on the Campaign for Musical Destruction tour in 1992.

The proceeds of Napalm Death's 1993 EP Nazi Punks Fuck Off were donated to anti-fascist organisations. This EP was inspired by Napalm Death touring South Africa during 1993, which was particularly controversial given that the band faced a lot of opposition from many white supremacists following the end of Apartheid.

The band remixed the track "Mind of a Razor" by London-based hip-hop crew Gunshot. The remixed version of the track appeared on the EP of the same name in 1992. Thereafter, they went to the studio and recorded Fear, Emptiness, Despair, which was released on 31 May 1994. The album represented a stylistic transition for Napalm Death. Fear, Emptiness, Despair maintained the complex music structures of their previous albums Utopia Banished and Harmony Corruption, but there was a greater emphasis placed on incorporating elements of groove into the band's style, resulting in a wider use of mid-paced music. Bassist Shane Embury recounts that Helmet and their album Strap It On influenced the band's style at the time, as they did many other heavy metal bands during the 1990s. Live concerts with Entombed, Obituary and Machine Head followed the album's release.

=== Diatribes, Greenway's departure and return (1995–1999) ===
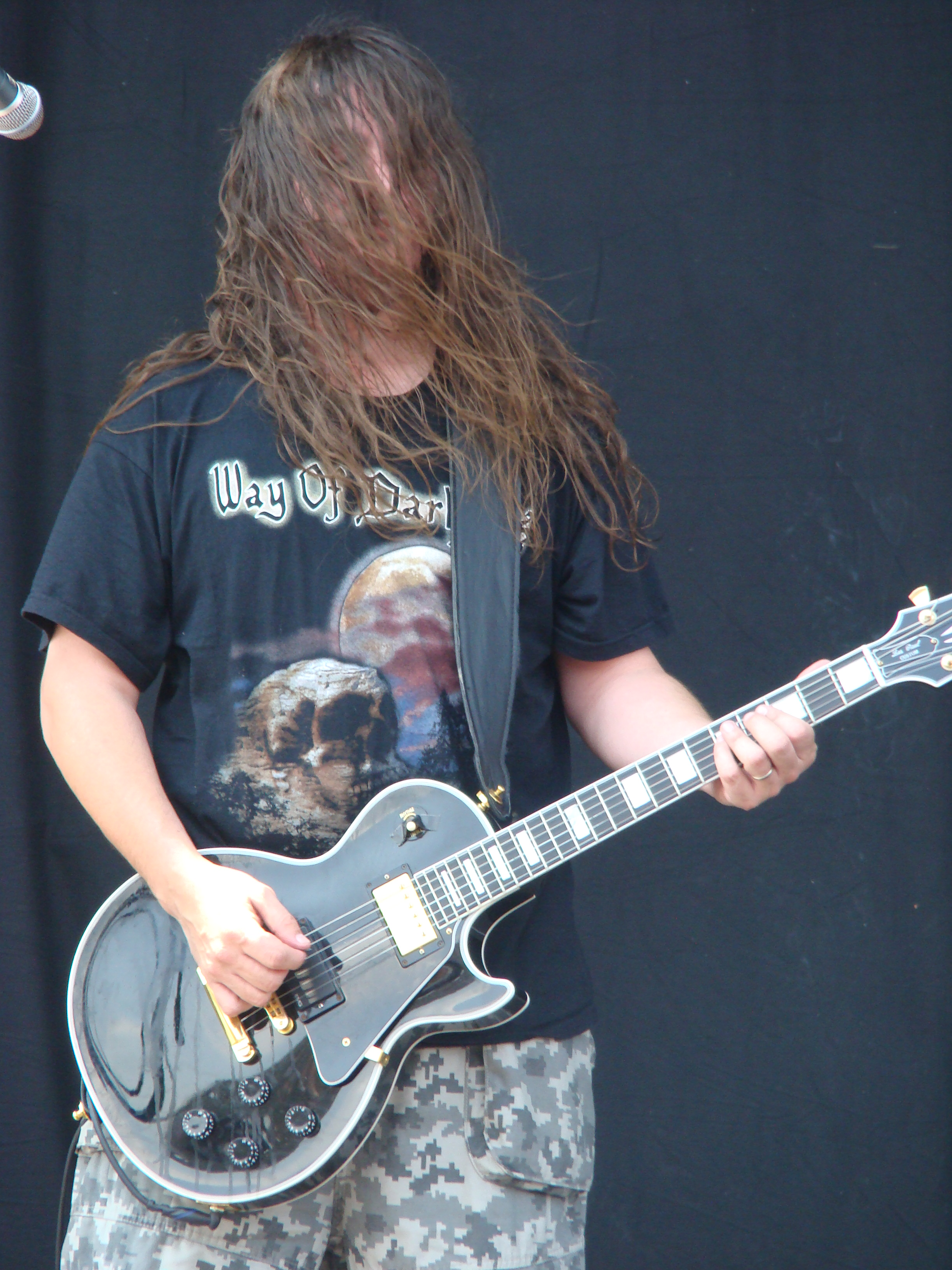
Mitch Harris in 2009

Their EP Greed Killing was released through Earache in December 1995, followed by the album Diatribes in January 1996. There was greater animosity between the band during this time, with a rift between Greenway and the remainder of the band, especially over the band's stylistic transition and the interference of background presences in the band, exemplifying the former when he stated that the band were "letting go of what made the band special". Greenway was hence expelled from the band later in 1996, and went to record with fellow grindcore act Extreme Noise Terror (ENT) on their release Damage 381. Greenway has stated that following his expulsion he was "devastated" and did not want to commit to ENT in fear of a repetition of the events that took place within Napalm Death.

ENT's vocalist Phil Vane replaced Greenway in Napalm Death. Alas, Shane Embury stated that Vane "couldn't pull off what was required. It was a hard day when I had to pull Phil aside and tell him it just wasn't working. We had been too much into doing our own thing to acknowledge all of the parts that made the Napalm machine tick. I quickly made the call and asked Barney if he would rejoin—time away certainly gave all of us the chance for reflection, regrets and hopes for the future. He was surprised by the material, as it was heavy and some of the songs were fast—I don't know what he really expected us to do!". Following Vane's departure, Greenway returned and the band released the album Inside the Torn Apart on 3 June 1997. An EP and music video were released for the album's track "Breed to Breathe" on 17 November 1997.

The album Words from the Exit Wound followed this, being released on 26 October 1998. The album was their last to be produced by Colin Richardson, who Embury believes hindered the album's creation, ultimately affecting the album's success. Embury has stated that bands such as Nasum influenced the album, and in Embury's view, this album represented a turning point in the band's sound, stating "it was also a turning point in us moving towards rediscovering our roots." Embury also mentioned that following the album's release, the band found it hard to tour due to restricted budgets from their record label, but Cradle of Filth and Nick Barker were able to alleviate this problem.

In 1999 the band made an appearance on Chris Evans' TFI Friday, playing three songs on a set lasting 59 seconds.

=== Departure from Earache and the departure of Pintado (2000–2004) ===
The band acrimoniously departed from Earache Records following Words from the Exit Wound and later, on 25 September 2000, released Enemy of the Music Business on the record label Dream Catcher. The album demonstrated the band's anger with the music industry and Earache in particular, whilst also incorporating a greater grindcore influence than on their previous few albums. The album was produced jointly by Simon Efemey and Russ Russell, the latter of whom has since been a long-time collaborator with Napalm Death.

Order of the Leech, released on 21 October 2002, continued the previous album's style, with production credits again shared by Efemey and Russell. In 2003, Embury and Hererra formed the side-project Venomous Concept with Kevin Sharp and Buzz Osborne, and that group has since released four albums. In 2004, Napalm Death recorded a covers album called Leaders Not Followers: Part 2, the sequel to their earlier covers EP. It contains covers of old hardcore punk and heavy metal bands, including Cryptic Slaughter, Massacre, Kreator, Sepultura, Siege and Discharge. Due to personal problems, Jesse Pintado did not play on either Order of the Leech or Leaders Not Followers: Part 2, and left the band in early 2004. Nevertheless, Pintado stated that he left because he grew tired of Napalm Death and wanted to start something new.

=== The Code Is Red... and Time Waits for No Slave (2005–2010) ===
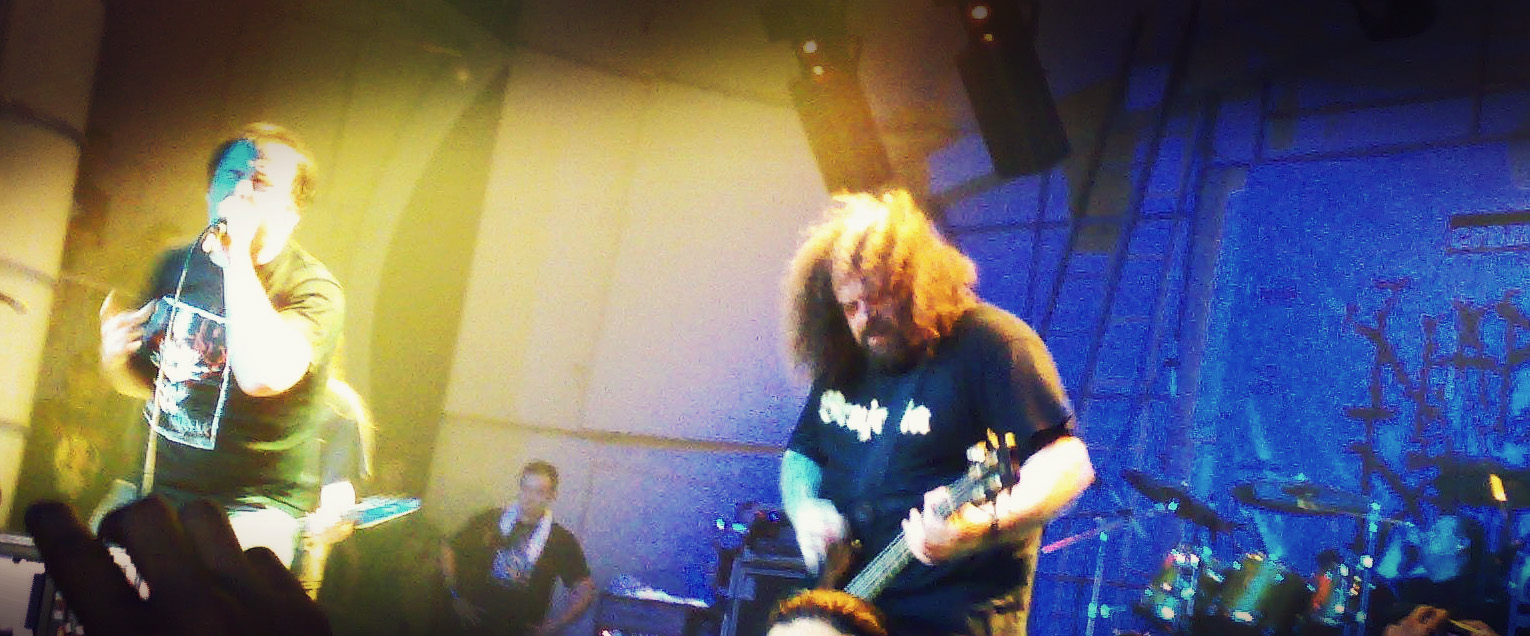
Live in 2007

In April 2005, their next album The Code Is Red...Long Live the Code was released. It features guest appearances from Jeffrey Walker (Carcass), Jamey Jasta (Hatebreed vocalist) and Jello Biafra (formerly of Dead Kennedys, and Lard among many other bands). The album continued the band's progressive approach to their brutal brand of extreme metal, with their trademark grindcore sound retained. Also in 2005, Embury and Herrera joined the extreme metal band Anaal Nathrakh for one tour.

Napalm Death finished recording their follow-up album titled Smear Campaign in June 2006, and it was released on 15 September 2006 to strong reviews from fans and critics alike. The main lyrical focus is criticism of the United States Government and other governments who are strongly religious. The album features a guest appearance by Anneke van Giersbergen, vocalist for the Dutch rock band The Gathering. There is a limited edition digipak version of Smear Campaign, which has two new songs, "Call That an Option?" and "Atheist Runt". They played a series of headline shows in support of the release including the Koko in Camden with Gutworm.

In early 2006 Napalm Death headlined a tour with Kreator, A Perfect Murder, and Undying. On 27 August 2006, Jesse Pintado died in a hospital in the Netherlands due to liver failure, prompting Mitch Harris to express his sadness at the loss of someone he thought of as "a brother" on the band's official website. After the Smear Campaign tour, the band did a 2007 "World Domination Tour". Bassist Shane Embury worked on a project with Mick Kenney of Anaal Nathrakh, with their work together released on FETO Records at the end of 2007. In November 2008, Napalm Death's fourteenth studio album, entitled Time Waits for No Slave, leaked onto the internet; it was officially released on 23 January 2009. Similar to Smear Campaign, Time Waits For No Slave also had a digipak version containing two extra songs ("Suppressed Hunger" and "Omnipresent Knife in Your Back").

=== Utilitarian and Apex Predator – Easy Meat (2011–2016) ===
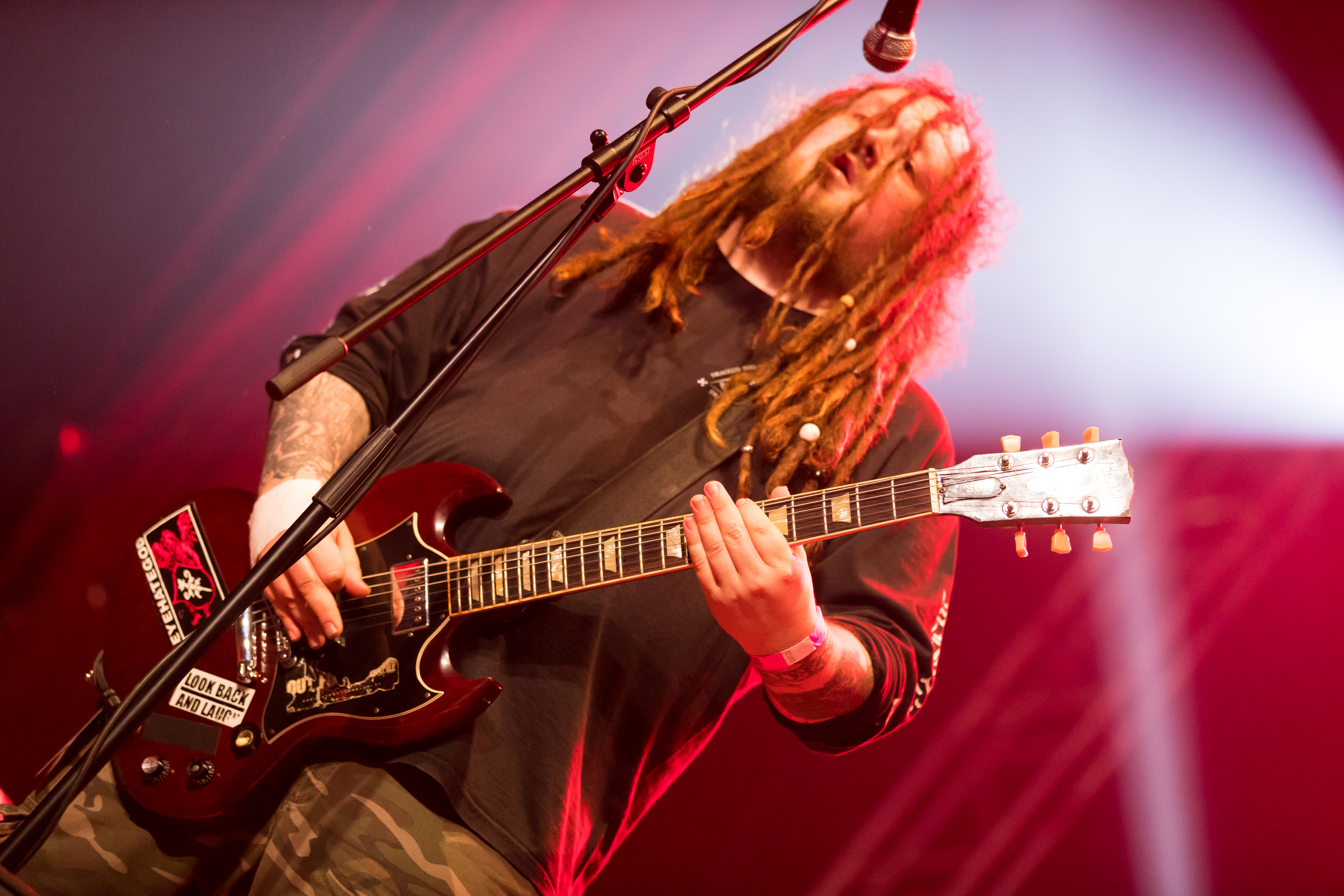
John Cooke in 2017

In February 2011, Napalm Death appeared in an episode of E4's Skins. In October 2011, Napalm Death performed at The Zoo, in Canada in which they debuted their song 'Quarantined'. Napalm Death entered Parlour Studio in Kettering, with producer Russ Russell to begin working on a new album. Also in 2011, they recorded the single "Legacy Was Yesterday". Napalm Death released their fourteenth studio album, Utilitarian, on 27 February 2012 in Europe and 28 February in North America via Century Media. In March 2012, Napalm Death headlined the Metal Mayhem IV festival organized by "Defenders of Metal" in Nepal. This was the first time Napalm Death played in Nepal. They played at Wacken Open Air in August 2012.

Napalm Death were scheduled to play a special one-off show at the Victoria and Albert Museum in London, on 22 March 2013. The show was eventually cancelled at the Victoria and Albert Museum, due to concerns that the noise levels could damage parts of the museum. The show was relocated to the De La Warr Pavilion in Bexhill, and was performed on 29 November 2013. The performance was a collaboration with ceramicist and Victoria and Albert Artist in Residence Keith Harrison. The show featured 10 large-scale wooden speakers filled with liquid clay that were left to solidify. When the band began to play, the clay inside the speakers was expected to vibrate, causing the speakers to crack and eventually explode. The actual performance was considered anticlimactic, as the speakers withstood the sonic vibration.

In April 2014, the band released a cover of the Cardiacs' song "To Go Off and Things" via Bandcamp. All proceeds from the single went towards Cardiacs frontman Tim Smith's recovery from a simultaneous heart attack/stroke he suffered in 2008. The band announced on 5 November 2014, via Facebook that due to an illness in the family, Mitch Harris would be taking a hiatus from the band, to be replaced by various guitarists on their tour. Napalm Death's fifteenth studio album, Apex Predator – Easy Meat, was released on 26 January 2015. On 4 July, a Nepal Charity Event track from the Apex Predator sessions called "Earth Wire" was released on their page. Napalm Death toured Europe during the fall of 2015 with support from Carcass, Herod, Obituary and Voivod.

=== Throes of Joy in the Jaws of Defeatism and Savage Imperial Death March (2017–2026) ===
The band performed at Wacken Open Air in August 2017. That same month, it was announced that Napalm Death entered the studio to begin recording their sixteenth studio album for an early 2018 release. In September, frontman Mark "Barney" Greenway spoke to Australia's Sticks for Stones condemning the announcement and stated that no material was being worked on at the moment but was in the "preliminary stages". He then said that it would not be released until later next year. In an interview at Download Festival in June 2018, Greenway confirmed that guitarist Mitch Harris would appear on the new album, which was not expected to be released until 2019, but did not know if he would tour with them again. Bassist Shane Embury confirmed in a March 2019 interview with Extreme Metal Festival News that Harris "did come over and record guitars on the new record" and Greenway has "nearly recorded all his vocal parts". He added, however, that the album would not be released before early 2020.

Napalm Death (along with Lamb of God, Anthrax, and Testament) opened for Slayer on the second leg of their final North American tour in the summer of 2018. In October 2019, Shane Embury announced that he would be unable to join the band during their North American Tour. Vernon Blake was announced as substitute live bassist.

An EP titled Logic Ravaged by Brute Force was released on 7 February 2020. The band released their sixteenth studio album, Throes of Joy in the Jaws of Defeatism, in September 2020.

The band played at Milwaukee Metal Fest in May of 2023.

Napalm Death released Savage Imperial Death March, a collaborative studio album with the Melvins, initially in a limited vinyl edition in February 2025, before Ipecac Recordings re-released it for a global release in April 2026. In addition to touring with the Melvins to promote the album, the band went on a 2026 North American tour with support from Primitive Man and Deadguy on select dates. This tour included an appearance at the Sonic Temple festival in Columbus, Ohio. The band were also confirmed to be making an appearance at Welcome to Rockville, which took place in Daytona Beach, Florida in May 2026.

On 15 July 2026, NPR released the Napalm Death Tiny Desk Concert on YouTube. That year, Greenway also provided vocals for the crust punk side project Totalis on its album Griefstate, alongside members of Skitsystem, Anti Cimex, War//Plague and Detestation.

=== Upcoming seventeenth studio album (2026–present) ===
As early as January 2026, Napalm Death began recording demos for their seventeenth studio album. In September 2026, bassist Shane Embury confirmed that the album will "probably" not be released until late 2027 due to touring and other scheduling conflicts.

== Musical style and ideology ==
Napalm Death are considered a grindcore band. The band played "usual heavy metal fare" in the beginning of their career, but later began to incorporate elements of hardcore punk and thrash metal. The band eventually began to incorporate elements of crust punk, noise rock, industrial music and death metal. Napalm Death are known for the brief durations of their songs. Harmony Corruption has been described as a "standard death metal" album.

The band espouse anarchism, humanism, socialism and animal rights. Napalm Death congratulated the Indonesian President Joko Widodo, a fan of the band, on their Facebook page. However, the band wrote an open letter asking Widodo to show clemency for Lindsay Sandiford, who was sentenced to death after a drug smuggling conviction in Indonesia.

== Legacy and impact ==
Jason Ankeny of AllMusic conferred the title of "the fathers of grindcore" on Napalm Death, contending the band broke ground by pushing heavy metal "into new levels of extremity". Jason Birchmeier, also of AllMusic, called Napalm Death "the definitive grindcore band", arguing that the albums Scum and From Enslavement to Obliteration "practically alone" define the genre.

Napalm Death coined the blast beat terminology for the famous hardcore punk drum technique. Dave Vincent of influential death metal band Morbid Angel recalls hearing Napalm Death for the first time:

“I remember I was at the Morbid house and Trey came running out of his bedroom, holding up one of the very first Napalm records—it might have been Scum — running out going, ‘Oh, my God, I cannot believe this. Listen to how fast this is. They call this a blast beat.’

== Members ==
Current members

- Shane Embury – bass, backing vocals (1987–present)
- Mark "Barney" Greenway – lead vocals (1989–1996, 1997–present)
- Danny Herrera – drums (1991–present)
- John Cooke – guitars (2022–present; touring 2014–2022), bass (touring 2012), backing vocals (2012, 2014–present), lead vocals (one off 2010)

== Discography ==
=== Studio albums ===
- Scum (1987)
- From Enslavement to Obliteration (1988)
- Harmony Corruption (1990)
- Utopia Banished (1992)
- Fear, Emptiness, Despair (1994)
- Diatribes (1996)
- Inside the Torn Apart (1997)
- Words from the Exit Wound (1998)
- Enemy of the Music Business (2000)
- Order of the Leech (2002)
- The Code Is Red...Long Live the Code (2005)
- Smear Campaign (2006)
- Time Waits for No Slave (2009)
- Utilitarian (2012)
- Apex Predator – Easy Meat (2015)
- Throes of Joy in the Jaws of Defeatism (2020)
- Savage Imperial Death March (2025) (with Melvins)

== Society and culture ==
=== Skins ===
In the E4 teen comedy-drama Skins, the seasons 5-6 character Rich Hardbeck (Alex Arnold) is a metalhead whose self-proclaimed favourite band is Napalm Death. In the second episode of the fifth series, 'Rich', he attends a performance by the band. Regarding the band's appearance, singer Barney Greenway stated,

"One thing that bothers me about TV is the way that teenagers are portrayed. It's down to the f--king Daily Mail's war on teenagers. They stigmatize young kids and it's bulls--t. The thing I like about Skins is it gives a genuine perspective on growing up. That's why we agreed to do this show."

=== Silicon Valley ===
In Season 5, Episode 3 of Silicon Valley, titled "Chief Operating Officer", Gilfoyle uses Napalm Death's "You Suffer" as an alert for fluctuations in Bitcoin.
