= Barney Greenway =

English vocalist (born 1969)

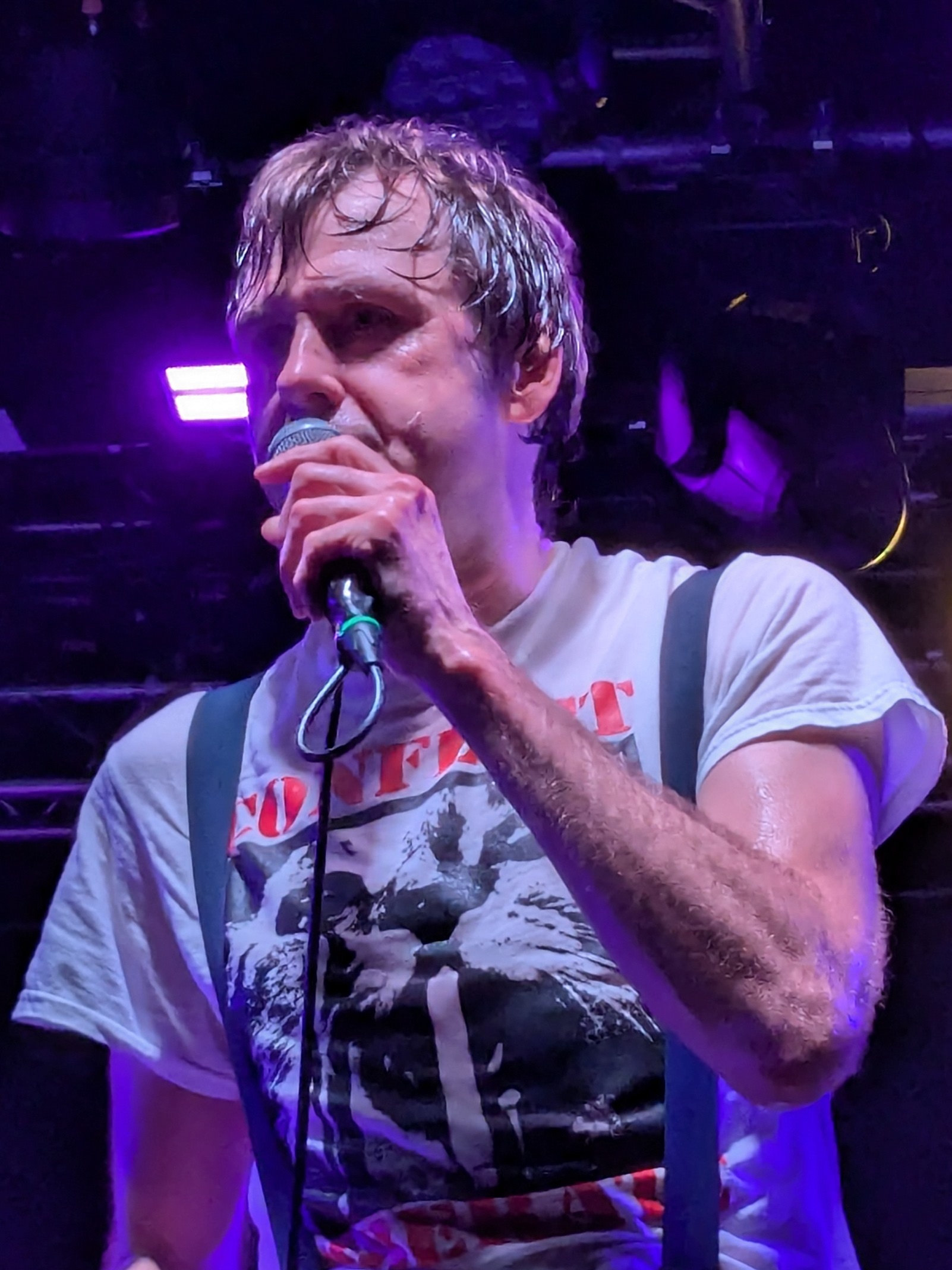
- Greenway performing with Napalm Death in 2026

Background information
- Born: Mark Andrew Greenway; 13 July 1969 (age 57); Great Barr, Birmingham, England
- Genres: Grindcore; death metal; crust punk
- Occupations: Singer; songwriter
- Years active: 1987–present
- Member of: Napalm Death
- Formerly of: Extreme Noise Terror; Benediction; Colostomy

Mark Andrew "Barney" Greenway (born 13 July 1969) is an English extreme metal vocalist who is the lead singer and primary lyricist of Napalm Death and a former member of Extreme Noise Terror and Benediction.

Greenway has stated his nickname "Barney" came from a time when he used to drink alcohol. He stated he would get so drunk that when he went anywhere, he would bump into everything. From this behaviour, his friend Stick (drummer of Doom) would call him "Rubble", which changed to "Barney Rubble" and then just "Barney".

According to Graham Hartmann of Loudwire, "Greenway's primordial swamp-thing barking is one of extreme metal's most distinct and imposing voices".

== Musical career ==
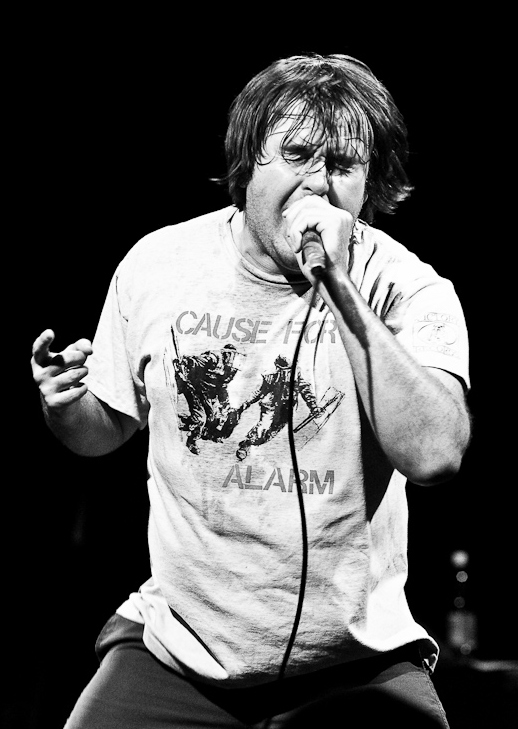
Greenway performing with Napalm Death at Tampere, Finland, 2009

Greenway began his career as the vocalist of the death metal band Benediction in 1989, with whom he recorded one album. Before that, he got his start in music by collaborating with local musicians—who would later join Cerebral Fix and Bolt Thrower to form the band Colostomy. In 1990, he joined Napalm Death, replacing the band's previous vocalist, Lee Dorrian, who went on to form the doom metal band Cathedral. Prior to his music career, Greenway worked as an engineer in the motor industry in Birmingham.

Greenway's first album with Napalm Death, Harmony Corruption, represented a shift in the band's musical style, incorporating a more death metal-oriented sound. The albums that followed this, including Utopia Banished, Fear, Emptiness, Despair and Diatribes, saw the band delve further into the aforementioned style whilst also incorporating elements of groove metal.

Greenway and Napalm Death parted ways in 1996, with bassist Shane Embury referring to the long unrest that had been present between Greenway and the remainder of the band. Greenway later joined Extreme Noise Terror to record vocals on their album Damage 381, with Extreme Noise Terror's vocalist Phil Vane joining Napalm Death to record vocals on their album Inside the Torn Apart. Vane and Napalm Death, however, were incompatible according to Embury, and after discussions between Greenway and the band, Greenway returned to record the vocals for the above album.

Greenway has remained with Napalm Death since 1997, releasing a number of critically acclaimed albums, and is the band's longest-serving lead vocalist.

== Artistry ==
Greenway is recognised for his strong Birmingham accent, and for his distinctive gruff vocal style, which is considered by many to be synonymous with Napalm Death.

Greenway's performance style has been likened to "watching someone throw a temper tantrum in a phone booth." According to Graham Hartmann of Loudwire, "the Napalm Death frontman’s erratic, ghost-fighting behavior onstage is the uncorking of fist-clenching energy and disgust for broken political systems and societal disgust."

Greenway is a progressive metal fan. He joined Dream Theater on stage at Ronnie Scott's Jazz Club and performed vocals on Metallica's "Damage, Inc." live. He previously reviewed progressive metal bands and albums for the British rock magazine Kerrang!. He has also stated his admiration for bands such as Motörhead and Throbbing Gristle, stating that the former's album, Ace of Spades, is his all-time favourite album.

== Personal life and views ==
Greenway is a supporter of Aston Villa F.C., as well as many animal rights organisations, including PETA. He has been a vegetarian since age 14, and has been a vegan since 2012.

Greenway is an avid reader.

Greenway is an atheist.

== Discography ==
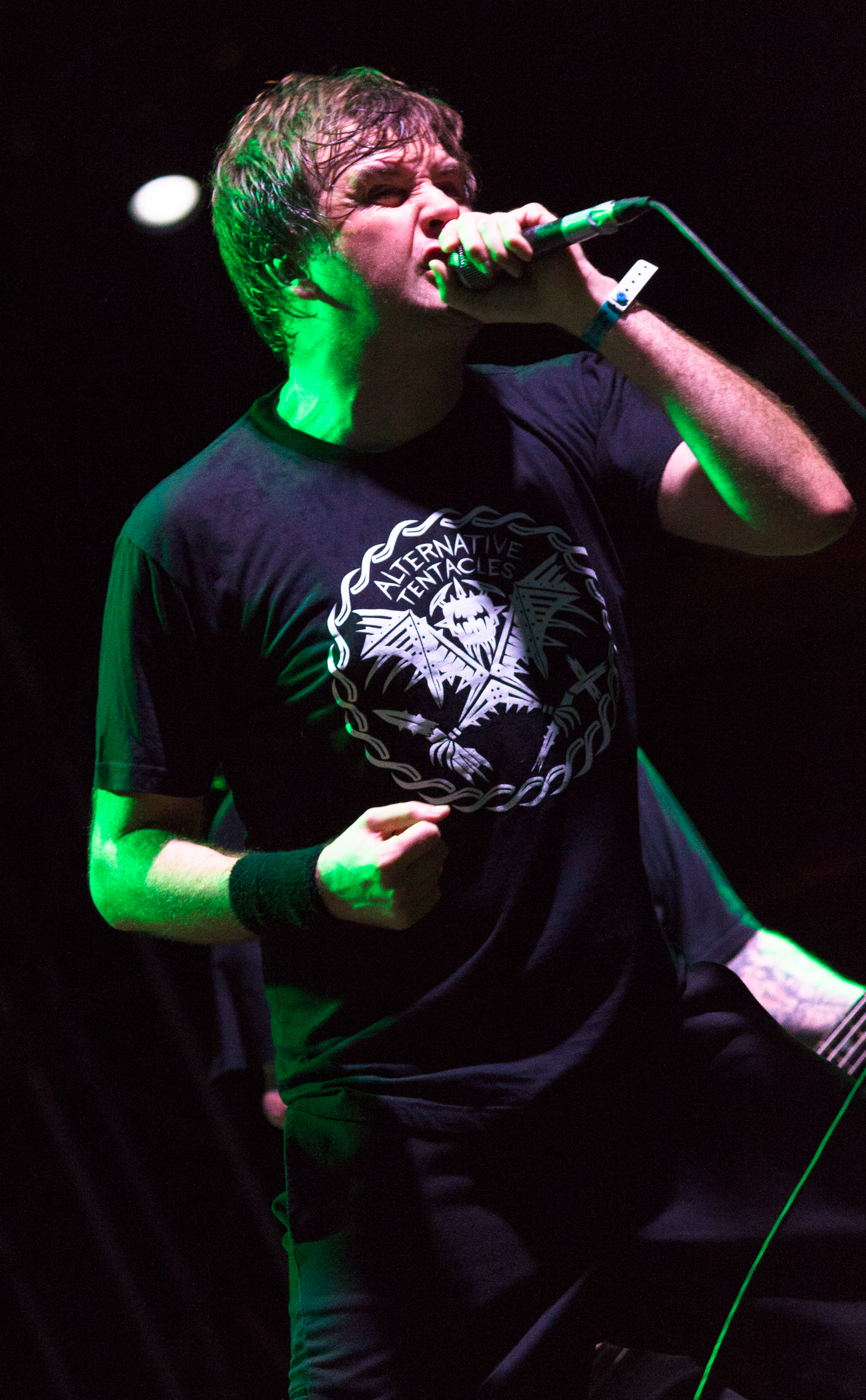
Greenway performing in 2015

=== With Napalm Death ===
- Harmony Corruption (1990)
- Utopia Banished (1992)
- Fear, Emptiness, Despair (1994)
- Diatribes (1996)
- Inside the Torn Apart (1997)
- Words from the Exit Wound (1998)
- Enemy of the Music Business (2000)
- Order of the Leech (2002)
- The Code Is Red...Long Live the Code (2005)
- Smear Campaign (2006)
- Time Waits for No Slave (2009)
- Utilitarian (2012)
- Apex Predator – Easy Meat (2015)
- Throes of Joy in the Jaws of Defeatism (2020)
- Resentment Is Always Seismic (2022)

=== With Benediction ===
- The Dreams You Dread
- Confess All Goodness (1990, Split-EP with Pungent Stench)
- Subconscious Terror (1990)
- Dark Is the Season (1992) (on the track "Forged in Fire")

=== With Extreme Noise Terror ===
- Damage 381 (1997)

=== Other appearances ===
- Cerebral Fix – Death Erotica – backing vocals on "Never Again"
- Leng Tch'e – Hypomanic – Guest vocals on "Totalitarian"
- The Haunted – Revolver – cameo appearance on "No Compromise" music video
- Cephalic Carnage – Anomalies – backing vocals
- Ginger – A Break in the Weather – backing vocals on "The Dying Art of the Chorus"
- Dream Theater – International Fan Club Christmas CD – vocals on cover of Metallica's "Damage Inc."
- Withered – Foile Circulare – backing vocals on "...The Faded Breath" and "Clamor Beneath"
- This Is Menace – The Scene Is Dead – vocals on "Beg for Silence"
- Born From Pain – War – vocals on "Behind Enemy Lines"
- Kill II This – Deviate – backing vocals on "The Flood"
- Extortion – Loose Screws – Guest Vocals on "Grind to a Halt"
- Volbeat – Beyond Hell/Above Heaven – Guest vocals on "Evelyn"
- Short Sharp Shock – Problems to the Answer – Guest vocals on "The Kill Floor, ROAR, Here Comes the Neighbourhood"
- Bloodbath – Survival of the Sickest - Guest vocals on "Putrefying Corpse"
- Escuela Grind – DDEEAATTHHMMEETTAALL - Guest vocals on "Meat Magnet"
- SAL - SAL - Guest vocals on “Doldrums”, “Blazing in the Sun”, “Exhaust” and “Flesh Circuit”
