= Shane Embury =

English bassist (born 1967)

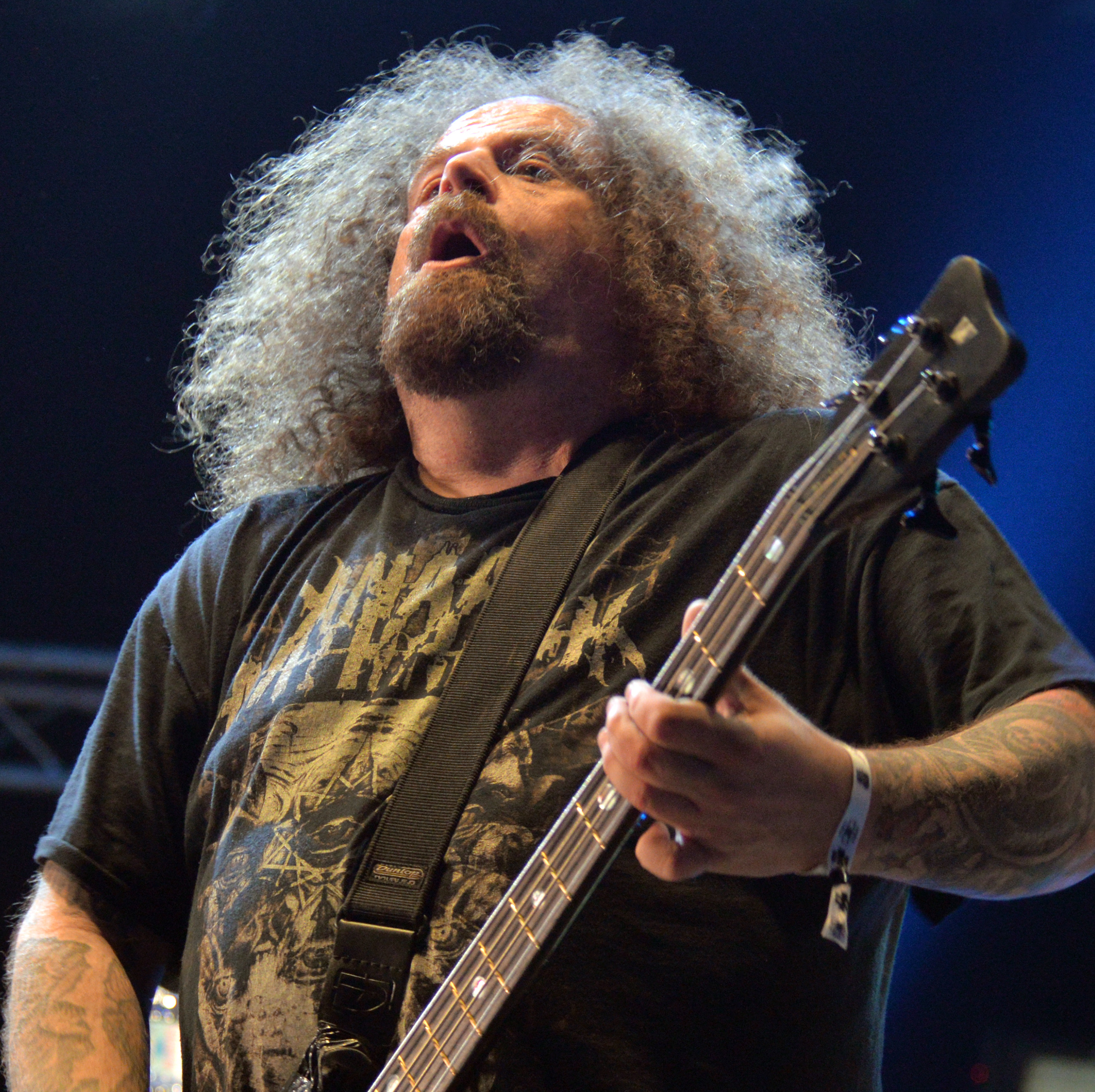
- Embury at Hellfest with Napalm Death in 2018

Background information
- Also known as: Dark Sky Burial; Embryonomous; Hongo
- Born: Shane Thomas Embury; 27 November 1967 (age 58); Broseley, Shropshire, England
- Genres: Heavy metal; death metal; grindcore; industrial metal
- Occupations: Musician; songwriter
- Instruments: Bass; guitar
- Years active: 1984–present
- Member of: Blood from the Soul; Brujeria; Napalm Death; Liquid Graveyard; Lock Up; Venomous Concept
- Formerly of: Unseen Terror; Meathook Seed
- Website: shaneembury.com

Shane Thomas Embury (born 27 November 1967) is an English musician, who is primarily known as the bassist of the grindcore band Napalm Death since 1987—the longest-serving member of the band.

== Career ==
=== Napalm Death ===
While not a founding member, Embury is the longest standing member of the band, having taken part in the Scum tour, replacing previous bassist Jim Whitely in July 1987. He was a fan of the band before he joined, first seeing them perform at Midlands venue The Mermaid the previous year and becoming close friends of the members of the band, particularly Mick Harris. Nicholas Bullen, the founding member of the band, originally asked Embury to join them before the recording of the B-side of the debut album Scum but Embury eventually declined due to nervousness, his biggest regret.

=== Warhammer ===
Before joining Napalm Death, Embury played drums in a death metal band called Warhammer with Mitch Dickinson. The band released one demo in 1985 called Abattoir of Death. After Warhammer, Embury and Dickinson did work as Unseen Terror. Embury also played drums in Azagthoth with fellow Warhammer guitarist Wayne Aston and bassist Pete Giles. Azagthoth recorded one demo at Rich Bitch Studios in Birmingham called Shredded Flesh.

=== Other projects ===
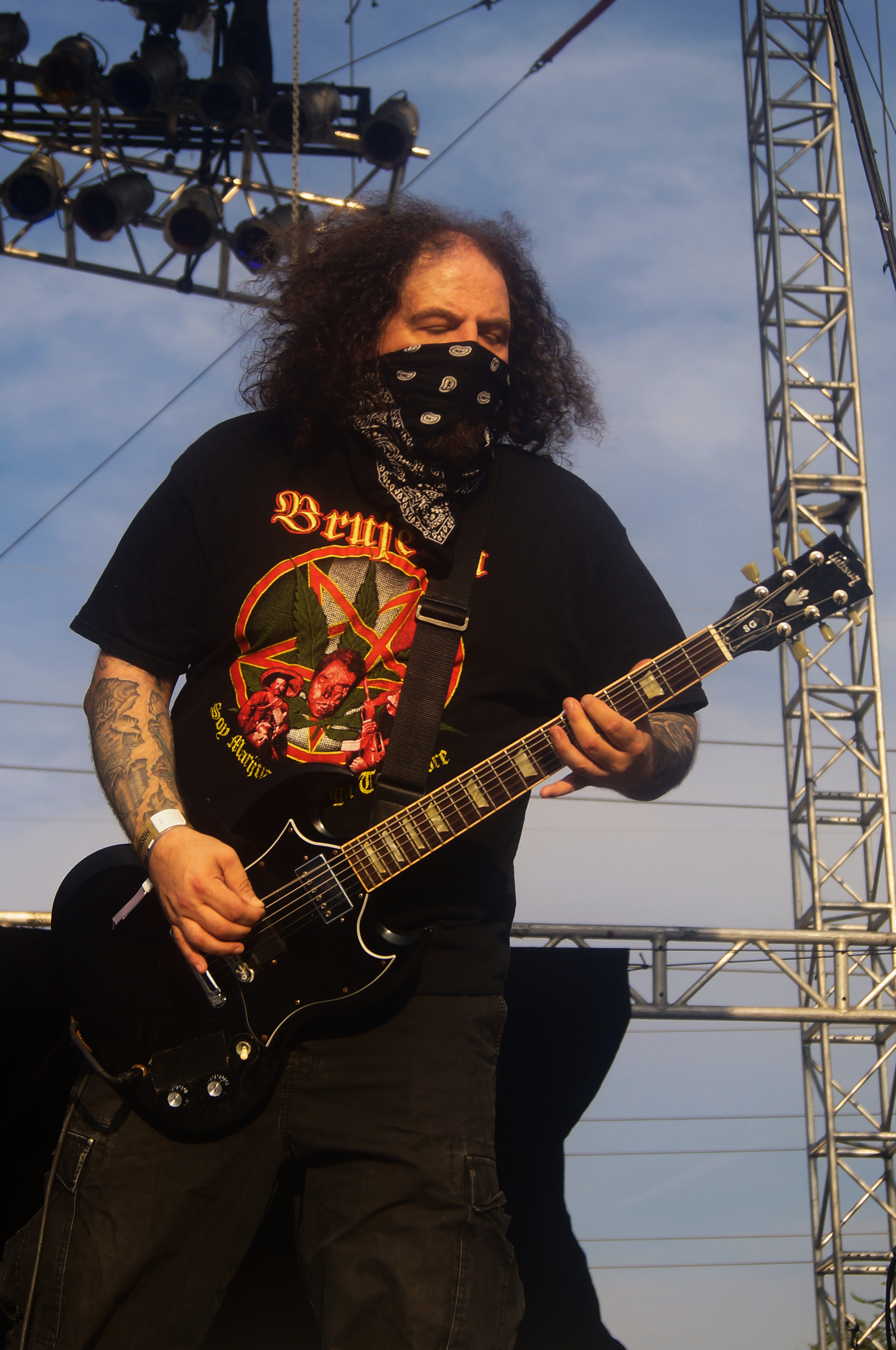
Embury as "Hongo" with Brujeria in 2015

Embury has a long list of side projects. He performed in the grindcore band Unseen Terror with Dickinson, who was also a member of Heresy. He formed an industrial metal band called Blood from the Soul with Lou Koller from New York's Sick of It All, which released their debut album, To Spite The Gland That Breeds, in 1993; the project reformed in 2020 to release a sophomore record, DSM-5. He was in an industrial band with Mitch Harris and several Obituary members called Meathook Seed. Harris and Embury both played together in a band called Little Giant Drug, which also featured singer Simon Orme: inspired by "4AD indie rock", Little Giant Drug released one album, Prism Cast, on Org Records in 1998. Embury was also part of an unconventional band called Malformed Earthborn with Brutal Truth's bass player Dan Lilker, Lock Up with Tomas Lindberg of At the Gates, and Brujeria, a Mexican/Chicano death metal supergroup band, touring with them live in several venues, including Wacken Open Air 2017.

Embury also plays with Napalm Death bandmate Danny Herrera, Kevin Sharp of Brutal Truth, and Dan Lilker of Nuclear Assault and Brutal Truth in the band Venomous Concept; and has recently toured with UK black metal/grindcore band Anaal Nathrakh. Embury recently resurrected a musical project called Absolute Power with close producer friends Simon Efemey & Russ Russell which he started in 2000, featuring Tim "Ripper" Owens on vocals & Brian Tatler of Diamond Head on guitar. Their debut album was finally released on download only though Embury's Feto Records label in 2011. More recently, Embury played on the latest Liquid Graveyard album, By Nature So Perverse with Cancer frontman and guitarist John Walker, drummer Nick Barker and vocalist Raquel Walker, released in 2016.

== Personal life ==
Born in Broseley, Shropshire, Shane Thomas Embury lives with his wife in Birmingham, West Midlands, and loves horror and science fiction books, movies and comics. He has tattoos on both of his arms, including the Napalm Death logo and the "Life?" image on his left arm.

In 2026, Embury told an interviewer that he missed a recent tour because of pancreatitis caused by excessive drinking which has caused him to be hospitalized three times at various times of his life. He sought refuge in Alcoholics Anonymous and Jungian psychology.

== Bibliography ==
- Life…? And Napalm Death. Rocket 88, London 2023, ISBN 9781910978986.
