= Mitch Harris =

American guitarist (born 1969)

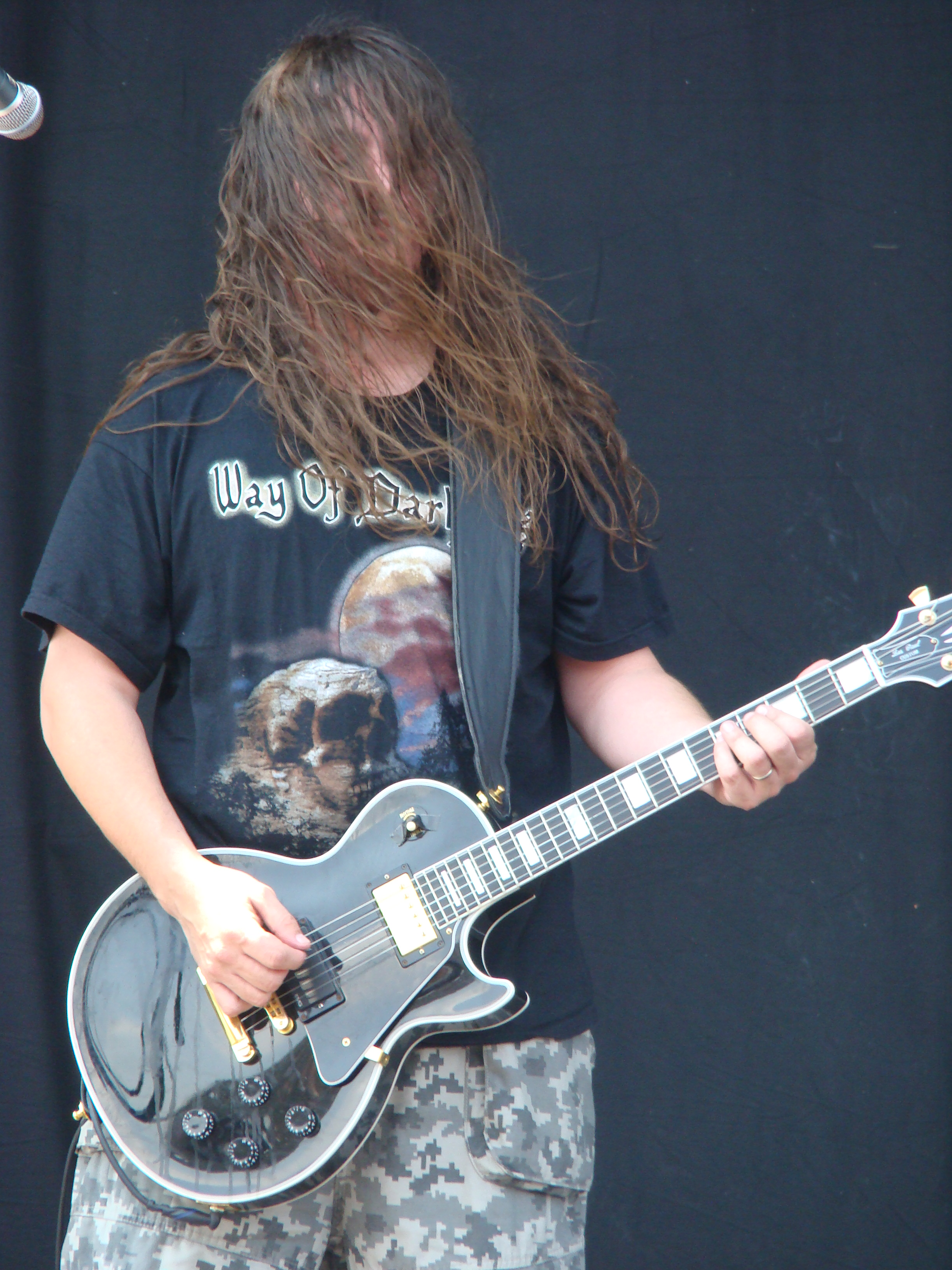
- Harris in 2009

Background information
- Born: Mitchell Harris; October 31, 1969 (age 57); Queens, New York, U.S.
- Genres: Death metal; doom metal; black metal; grindcore
- Occupations: Musician, songwriter
- Instrument: Guitar
- Years active: 1987–present
- Labels: Earache, Century Media
- Member of: Defecation, Brave the Cold
- Formerly of: Meathook Seed, Napalm Death

Mitchell Harris (born October 31, 1969) is an American guitarist. He started his career in the Las Vegas, Nevada grindcore band Righteous Pigs. He did a side project with Mick Harris – then the drummer of grindcore band Napalm Death – called Defecation. Shortly thereafter, he left Righteous Pigs and permanently joined Napalm Death in 1989 as their lead guitarist, firstly appearing on the Harmony Corruption album, before quitting in 2014.

He also participated in the projects Meathook Seed, Little Giant Drug, and Goatlord. In 2013, a featured song called "K.C.S." was included on the album Savages by the heavy metal band Soulfly that was released on October 4, 2013, and was written by Harris and Max Cavalera.

His band Brave the Cold released their debut album, Scarcity, in October 2020, on the label Mission Two Entertainment.

In 2024 he featured as a guest musician on Kati Rán's SÁLA album.
