= Ellipsis (Scorn album) =

Remix album by Scorn
- Released: May 9, 1995
- Genre: Electronic
- Label: Earache MOSH 111
- Producer: Scorn

Scorn chronology
Evanescence (1994)	Ellipsis (1995)	Gyral (1995)

Professional ratings
Review scores
Source	Rating
Allmusic	2.5/5 stars
Muzik	4/5 stars

Ellipsis is a remix album by Scorn, originally released in 1995 on Earache Records. It was remastered along with Evanescence and released as a two disc set in 2009.

It's mainly a remix album for Evanescence, though it contains a remix of Nights Ash Black from Colossus. The remixes were made by Meat Beat Manifesto, Coil, Bill Laswell, Scanner, Autechre, P.C.M. and Germ, as well as Scorn themselves.

== Track listing ==
1. "Silver Rain Fell (Meat Beat Manifesto Mix)" – 8:35
2. "Exodus (Scorn Mix)" – 5:39
3. "Dreamspace (Shadow Vs Executioner Mix)" – 11:30
4. "Night Ash Black (Slow Black Underground River Mix)" – 15:47
5. "Night Tide (Flaneur Electronique Mix)" – 6:30
6. "Falling (FR 13 Mix)" – 10:18
7. "The End (Nightmare Mix)" – 7:40
8. "Automata (Germ Mix)" – 6:52
9. "Light Trap (Scorn Mix)" – 6:08

== Personnel ==
- Nic Bullen – bass, sampler, percussion, voice, guitar
- Mick Harris – drums, drum programming, sampler, percussion,
