= You Suffer =

1987 song by Napalm Death

Single by Napalm Death

from the album Scum
- B-side: "Mega-Armageddon Death Pt. 3" by Electro Hippies; "Dead"
- Released: 1989
- Recorded: August 1986
- Studio: Rich Bitch Studio; Birmingham, England
- Genre: Grindcore; novelty
- Length: 0:01
- Label: Earache
- Songwriters: Justin Broadrick; Nicholas Bullen; Mick Harris
- Producer: Digby Pearson
- Sample "You Suffer"

Music video
- "You Suffer" on YouTube

"You Suffer" is a song by English grindcore band Napalm Death, released on the band's debut studio album, Scum (1987). The song was written by Nicholas Bullen, Justin Broadrick, and Mick Harris during the March 1986 demo sessions for From Enslavement to Obliteration. In March 2023, Rolling Stone ranked the song at number 72 on their "100 Greatest Heavy Metal Songs of All Time" list.

== Background and influence ==
The official four-word lyrics to the song are: "You suffer, but why?". Justin Broadrick said about the song:

"You Suffer" was largely a comedy thing, one-second song... it's ridiculous, but it was hilarious. We played that song in front of 30 local kids, like, every weekend. We played that song 30 times. It was hilarious.

Nicholas Bullen, writer of the song's four-word lyrics, said that the brevity of "You Suffer" was inspired by Wehrmacht's 1985 song "E!". "You Suffer" would become an influence on the "noisecore" micro-genre, inspiring many bands such as Sore Throat, 7 Minutes of Nausea, Deche-Charge, Anal Cunt, and others to release full-length recordings of exclusively "microsong" content. Swedish progressive metal band Opeth and Finnish gothic metal band HIM have both covered the song live. The song was featured in season 5, episode 3 ("Chief Operating Officer") of the HBO comedy show Silicon Valley. In the episode, the song acts as Bertram Gilfoyle's alarm to indicate that Bitcoin's value dipped below a certain threshold, making it not worth to mine, thus requiring Gilfoyle to alter his mining rig.

== Release ==
In 1989, "You Suffer" appeared on one side of a 7" single given away free with copies of a compilation album entitled Grindcrusher. The song on the other side, "Mega-Armageddon Death Part 3" by the Electro Hippies, also lasts approximately one second, making the disc the shortest single ever released. Each side features one groove at the outer edge of the disc containing the music, with the rest of the surface containing etched writing and cartoons.

To coincide with the release of the Scum DualDisc in March 2007, a music video produced by Earache Records was released for the song. The video shows a girl jumping up and down with fake blood/gunshot effects overlaid on the footage.

== Track listing ==
=== Vinyl release ===
Side one
You Suffer – 0:03
Side two
"Mega-Armageddon Death Part 3" (performed by Electro Hippies) 0:03

=== Digital release ===
1. "You Suffer" 0:01
2. "Dead" 0:02
