= Punk's Not Dead =

Punk's Not Dead may refer to:

- Punks Not Dead, debut album by The Exploited
- Punk's Not Dead (2007 film), a 2007 documentary film
- Punk's Not Dead (2011 film), a 2011 Macedonian film
- P'unk Is Not Dead, album by P'unk-en-Ciel, see Butterfly (L'Arc-en-Ciel album)

== See also ==
- Punks Not Dad, British band
- Punk is dead (disambiguation)
