= Anamnesis =

Anamnesis may refer to:

- Anamnesis (Christianity), a liturgical statement in Christianity
- Anamnesis (philosophy), a concept in Platonic epistemology
- Anamnesis (rhetoric), a rhetorical device
- Medical history, patient information collected by a physician
- Anamnesis (Scorn album), 1999
- "Anamnesis" (Millennium), a television episode
- Star Ocean: Anamnesis, a 2016 video game
