= Vae Solis =

Studio album by Scorn
- Released: June 9, 1992
- Genre: Industrial metal; dark ambient; industrial; post-metal; sludge metal
- Length: 55:11 (2LP); 73:53 (CD)
- Label: Earache (UK); Relativity (US)
- Producer: Nicholas Bullen, Mick Harris

Scorn chronology
Vae Solis (1992)	Colossus (1993)

Professional ratings
Review scores
Source	Rating
Allmusic	3/5 stars

Vae Solis is the debut album by Scorn, originally released in 1992 on Earache in the UK, and Relativity in the United States. It features the same musician lineup as Side A of Napalm Death's Scum.

It has been said that the cover features a collage of two medical photographs superimposed. One photo is an open throat, probably diseased, while the other is a cancerous cell, taken with microscope.

The album is often associated with industrial and experimental music.

A music video was made for Lick Forever Dog.

== Track listing ==
No.	Title	Length
1.	"Spasm"	2:49
2.	"Suck and Eat You"	3:48
3.	"Hit"	7:36
4.	"Walls of My Heart"	7:02
5.	"Lick Forever Dog"	6:29
6.	"Thoughts of Escape"	5:18
7.	"Deep In - Eaten Over and Over"	8:28
8.	"On Ice"	8:00
9.	"Heavy Blood"	5:41
10.	"To End" (cassette/vinyl-only track)	2:25

With the following extras on the CD version

1. "Scum After Death (dub)" – 5:54
2. "Fleshpile (edit)" – 5:15
3. "Orgy of Holiness" – 4:48
4. "Still Life" – 4:13

== Personnel ==
Scorn

- Nicholas Bullen – vocals, bass guitar, sampler, production, artwork
- Mick Harris – drums, sampler, backing vocals, production

Additional musicians and production

- Justin Broadrick – guitar
- Paul Johnston – engineering
- Luton Sinfield – photography
- Antz White – artwork
