= Jim Whitely =

Jim Whiteley
- Also known as: Jim Grinder
- Origin: Birmingham, England
- Genres: Hardcore punk, grindcore
- Occupations: Musician, lyricist
- Instrument: Bass guitar
- Years active: 1986–present
- Labels: Earache, Your Choice
- Formerly of: Napalm Death (1986–1987), Doom (1987), Ripcord (1987–1989)

Jim Whiteley is a musician who in the late 1980s played bass guitar in several Birmingham-based hardcore and grindcore bands, most notably Napalm Death.

== Biography ==
Jim Whiteley was brought into Napalm Death in 1986 in hopes of restoring enthusiasm and dedication among the rest of the band, and to let bassist and singer Nik Bullen focus on singing. However, this plan failed, and after several concerts guitarist Justin Broadrick and then Bullen left the group. They were quickly replaced by Bill Steer on guitar and Lee Dorrian on vocals. While Whiteley's tenure in Napalm Death lasted just about a year, during that time the band released its debut album Scum, on which he performed and wrote the lyrics for the second side (the first side was recorded before he joined). During this time Whitely also played bass for Doom on some studio sessions.

After touring to support Scum, Whitely left to join the more established and successful (at the time) hardcore band Ripcord. During his time in Ripcord, the band played a Your Choice Records show and recorded their second album, Poetic Justice. This was short-lived, as Ripcord disbanded by 1989. In 2004, Whiteley reunited with Napalm Death to record bass for two tracks on their cover album Leaders Not Followers: Part 2: Discharge's "War's No Fairytale", and Anti Cimex's "Game of Arseholes".

== Discography ==
=== Napalm Death ===
- Scum (1987)
- Leaders Not Followers: Part 2 (2004)

=== Doom ===
- A Vile Peace (1987)

=== Ripcord ===
- Your Choice Live Series (1988)
- Harvest Hardcore (1988)
- Poetic Justice (1988)
