= Stealth (album) =

Studio album by Scorn
- Released: November 19, 2007
- Recorded: The Box, Birmingham, England, UK
- Genre: Dubstep, illbient
- Length: 48:52
- Label: Ohm Resistance

Scorn chronology
List of Takers (2004)	Stealth (2007)	Refuse; Start Fires (2010)

Professional ratings
Review scores
Source	Rating
Allmusic	4/5 stars

Stealth is the ninth album by Scorn, released on November 19, 2007 through Ohm Resistance. After a five-year absence, November 2007 saw the band return to the studio properly with this album.

== Track listing ==
All music is composed by Mick Harris

No.	Title	Length
1.	"Stripped Back Hinge"	6:11
2.	"Rove"	6:06
3.	"Glugged"	5:49
4.	"Running Rig"	5:59
5.	"Snag"	5:46
6.	"The Palomar"	5:55
7.	"Enough to Hold Bottom"	6:58
8.	"1.75 TC"	6:08

== Personnel ==
- Mick Harris – instruments
- Nicolas Chevreux – photography, design
