= Archive Fever =

1995 book by Jacques Derrida

Archive Fever: A Freudian Impression
- Cover of the first edition
- Author: Jacques Derrida
- Original title: Mal d'Archive: Une Impression Freudienne
- Language: French
- Subject: The Archive
- Publisher: Éditions Galilée
- Publication date: 1995
- Publication place: France
- English publication date: 1996
- Media type: Print

Archive Fever: A Freudian Impression (French: Mal d'Archive: Une Impression Freudienne) is a book by the French philosopher Jacques Derrida.

It was first published in 1995 by Éditions Galilée, based on a lecture Derrida gave at a conference, Memory: The Question of the Archives, organised by the Freud Museum in 1994.

An English translation by Eric Prenowitz was first published as an article in the academic journal Diacritics in 1995 and then as a book by University of Chicago Press in 1996.

== Summary ==
In Archive Fever, Derrida discusses the nature and function of the archive, particularly in Freudian terms and in light of the death drive. The book also contains discussions of Judaism and Jewish identity and of electronic technology such as e-mail.

== Overview ==
Derrida begins by referencing the etymology of the word "archive", saying "the meaning of 'archive,' its only meaning, comes to it from the Greek arkheion: initially a house, a domicile, an address, the residence of the superior magistrates, the archons, those who commanded." He goes on to say that it is those archons, those citizens who held significant political power and "were considered to posses the right to make or to represent the law", are the ones who thus have the power to interpret the archives, to "recall the law and call on or impose the law."

He goes on to state that it is at this place of the archons that the archives take place; this "passage from private to the public" of these physical documents is a marker of an archive itself forming. He references Freud's last house becoming a museum, its "passage from one institution to another", and how what was private of Freud's is now made public as this newly formed "archive".

Derrida also references Freud's idea of the "death drive" to further discuss his idea of "archival violence". For Derrida, archival violence, or "archiviolithic drive", is an unintentional push towards the "eradication, of that which can never be reduced to mnēmē or to anamnēsis, that is, the archive, consignation, the documentary or monumental apparatus as hymnēma, mnemotechnical supplement or representative, auxiliary or memorandum." This passion, or fever, towards consigning anything that can be reduced to a memory into a mnēmē, is archive fever itself; this drive towards archiving any trace of memory, Derrida argues, has the potential to leave out other memories in the process, thus resulting in a conflicting struggle of which memory is archived. Derrida brings into discussion an issue of power, and who dictates what is written in history.

Derrida also notes the "future" that these archives are able to determine through their selection of what memories of people are kept and what memories are destroyed. He writes, "the question of the archive is not, we repeat, a question of the past...It is a question of the future, the question for the future itself, the question of a response, of a promise, and of a responsibility for tomorrow. The archive: if we want to know what this will have meant, we will only know in the times to come."

With this "question of the future" in mind, Derrida references Yosef Hayim Yerushalmi and his book, "Monologue with Freud." Derrida quotes Yerushalmi:

Professor Freud, at this point I find it futile to ask whether, genetically or structurally, psychoanalysis is really a Jewish science; that we shall know, if it is at all knowable, only when much future work has been done. Much will depend, of course, on how the very terms Jewish and science are to be defined.

Derrida explores how Yerushalmi disrupts this "linear order of presents", how in writing in future tense, he sets the archive of Freud as a continually changing structure; what was discussed and recorded of Freud is no longer set in stone, but is now subject to change depending on any "future work" that is done. Yerushalmi sets an example to Derrida how the archive is not a fixed repository of data, but a spectral and changing structure.

== Applications ==
=== Migrant Archives ===
Derrida's theory of "archive fever" is referenced in Rodrigo Lazo's chapter in the book, Teaching and Studying the Americas. Lazo titles his chapter "Migrant Archives: New Routes in and out of American Studies". Lazo observes how archives are vital and influential places of power, as archives help give nations "authority and credibility"; he recognizes that archives "constitute" memory, along with recording it and disseminating information. In his chapter, he questions the authority of these archives, particularly keeping in mind the "migrant archives":

Migrant archives reside in obscurity and are always at the edge of annihilation. They are the texts of the past that have not been written into the official spaces of archivization, even though they weave in and out of the buildings that house documents. Migrant archives are oxymoronic because one of the functions of archival organization is storage in a specific (safe) place. Migration, by contrast, connotes a journey.

In examining the migrant archives, Lazo uses Derrida's theory of "archive fever" to question and examine how the memory of the archive is constituted, and how "history is written". He uses specifically the example of Mis Memorias, a memoir published by Luis G. Gómez in 1935, to apply Derrida's "archive fever".

=== Curatorial practice and theory ===
Antonio Cataldo of OnCurating discusses Derrida's "archive fever" in reference to curation practices. Cataldo reflects on how institutions, like fotogalleries, shift toward more structured exhibitions that reflects a broader institutionalization of memory and the archival process itself. This shift in archival process also reflects how the new archival structure of the institution becomes a new form of authority, where the original purpose of the institution has now changed. Cataldo reflects on how Fotogalleriet could have potentially changed from its origins as a kunsthalle, a place that "tries to analyze what's happening now and make sense of it by putting artworks into a display to provoke discussions", to a museum that "materially dispossesses communities and their meaning system" through its focused curation of pieces to display.

== See also ==
- Anamnesis (philosophy)
- Anamnesis (rhetoric)
- Library and information science
- Politics of memory
