= Gyral (album) =

Studio album by Scorn
- Released: October 31, 1995
- Recorded: The Box, Birmingham, England
- Genres: Dark ambient, industrial hip-hop
- Length: 61:47
- Label: Scorn Records
- Producer: Mick Harris

Scorn chronology
| Evanescence (1994) | Gyral (1995) | Logghi Barogghi (1996) |

Gyral is an album by Scorn, originally released in 1995 on Scorn Recordings. Nic Bullen left the group in 1995, so the project continued on as an essentially solo project for Mick Harris. As a result, much output since Gyral has been minimalist beats with an emphasis on very deep bass lines, often resembling dub and trip hop in structure.

== Reception ==
Professional ratings
Review scores
| Source | Rating |
|---|---|
| Allmusic | 4.5/5 stars |
| Muzik | 3.5/5 stars |

== Track listing ==
| No. | Title | Length |
|---|---|---|
| 1. | "Six Hours One Week" | 6:40 |
| 2. | "Time Went Slow" | 9:45 |
| 3. | "Far In Out" | 5:55 |
| 4. | "Stairway" | 8:11 |
| 5. | "Forever Turning" | 5:18 |
| 6. | "Black Box" | 7:41 |
| 7. | "Hush" | 9:06 |
| 8. | "Trondheim - Gävle" | 9:11 |

== Personnel ==
Scorn

- Mick Harris – Instruments, mixing

Additional musicians and production

- Ruth Collins – artwork
- Noel Summerville – mastering
