= Greetings from Birmingham =

Greetings From Birmingham

Studio album by Scorn
- Released: September 26, 2000
- Recorded: April 2000–May 2000 at The Box, Birmingham, England, UK
- Genre: Illbient, industrial hip hop, dub
- Length: 51:14
- Label: Hymen
- Producer: Mick Harris

Scorn chronology
Anamnesis: 1994-97 (1999)	Greetings From Birmingham (2000)	Plan B (2002)

Professional ratings
Review scores
Source	Rating
Allmusic	4/5 stars

Greetings From Birmingham is the seventh album by Scorn, released in September 2000 through Hymen Records. In May 1997, following the release of Zander, Mick Harris decided to end the band to finish relations with KK Records, and from 1997 to 1999, he was making music with other names and other musicians, until 2000, when returned with the band with the record company Hymen Records for Greetings from Birmingham.

== Track listing ==
All music is composed by Mick Harris

No.	Title	Length
1.	"Soon Come" (Version Beat)	1:01
2.	"Can But Try"	6:53
3.	"Still On"	6:46
4.	"Told You Can Tell"	4:55
5.	"Flap"	5:19
6.	"Soon Come"	5:10
7.	"Told You Can Tell" (part 2)	2:00
8.	"Closedown"	6:46
9.	"Part Of"	4:45
10.	"Flap" (part 2)	1:53
11.	"That Don't"	4:29
12.	"Can But Try" (Back on Itself)	0:11
13.	"Melt"	1:06

== Personnel ==
- Anthony Burnham – photography
- Mick Harris – instruments, production, mixing
