= Hiatus (band) =

Belgian hardcore punk band

- Origin: Liege, Belgium
- Genres: Crust punk; hardcore punk
- Years active: 1989-1996 2009-present
- Labels: Profane Existence, Skuld Releases, Sound Pollution
- Past members: Willis "Wills" Nollomont; Azill Kamizoll; Phil; Jonas Babybel; Ben "Plastic" Fery; Fred; Chris Gascoigne; Phill Kill; Rafi

Hiatus was a Belgian hardcore punk band from Liege, Belgium, formed in 1989, that broke up in 1996.

== History ==
Hiatus formed in May 1989, at this time the line-up was Phill, Ben, Raf and Phil. They played in a Doom/Discharge/E.N.T. style and recorded a rehearsal demo called "The Frightening Men Story". In May 1990, they put out their second rehearsal demo called "In My Mind" and soon after Wills joined them on bass.

The band went into the studio and recorded a set of songs which were released on two 7-inches and various compilations. Their first 7-inch "I don't scare easily but..." was released on the French label Urban Alert Records and had a second pressing on Nabate/Mother Peace Records. A split 7-inch with RMR from Japan called "Severe Existence" was Hiatus' second 7-inch and was released on the Japanese label MCR Co.

Phill and Raf left and some new members joined: Azill on guitars and vocals and for a short time Vrokker and Leffe from Chronic Disease. During August 91, Hiatus toured the United States and Canada with The Wurst from Rhode Island and played with bands like Rorschach, and Born Against. In November 1991, they recorded another studio session. From this recording the "Way Of Doom" 7-inch and Hiatus/Embittered 7-inch were released in 1992. In February 1992, Hiatus toured Europe with No Security from Sweden, also in 1992 they toured the U.K. with Mushroom Attack from the Netherlands.

In 1993, their "From Resignation ... To Revolt" LP was released on Sound Pollution. Hiatus also toured Europe and Eastern Europe that year. Among others, there were four dates in Sweden, booked by the band Viktors Haufnarren and Resistance Productions. The four France dates were booked by Six Feet Over, Ultimate Disorder, Catalogue Du Grand Nord and Maloka collective. In early August, they made a five dates tour in Spain with the band Six Feet Over. The tour was booked by a member of the Spanish band Positi Caustico. The August 15 date at the "Festes Alternatives a Gracia" in Barna was a huge success, with thousands of punks and anarchists. Hiatus played there with the band Speereth. The last date in the tour was in Luxembourg, toured by Diff (No More and Subway Arts).

In early 1994, the Doom/Hiatus 7-inch was released. In February 1995, they recorded their "El sueño de la razón produce monstruos" LP. In June 1995, they toured the United States and Canada again. A self-titled mini LP commonly called "the brain" was released on Skuld Releases/Profane Existence in 1996, the songs on it showed a big progression from their earlier releases with elements of modern hardcore being added to their crust punk sound. They split up in 1997.

Azill and Willy from Hiatus also played in Unhinged who have a 7-inch and LP out on Nabate and in the band Skewwhiff who have an LP "taedium vitae" on Life is abuse/Trujaca fala records.

After a hiatus of 12 years, Willy, Phil, Ben and Azill made three reunion gigs in 2009 (in Liège, Lille and London) with Chris (Health Hazard/Doom) on bass. On hiatus again, they eventually reunite again in 2019 with this time Sam (Werly/Suitside vs vedaplight) on bass. They are now back again and record a new album beginning of 2022.

== Members ==
=== Final line-up ===
- Willy "Wills" - lead vocals (1990–1997, 2009–2024)
- Azill - guitar (1990–1997, 2009–present)
- Phil - guitar (1989–1997, 2009–present)
- Ben - drums (1989–1997, 2009–present)
- Sam - bass (2019–present)

=== Past members ===
- Fred(alabas) - bass (1992-1994)
- Chris Gascoigne - bass (1994 and 2009)
- Phill - vocals - guitar (1989-1990)
- Raf - vocals - bass (1989-1990)
- Jonas - bass (1994-1997)
- Vrokker - lead vocals (1990)
- Leffe - lead vocals (1990)
- Hannes - drums (1997)

== Discography ==
=== Albums ===
- From Resignation... To Revolt (1993)
- El Sueño De La Razón Produce Monstruos (1995)
- Old-fashioned Shit for Consumers (1995)
- The brain mini album (1996)

=== EPs ===
- Hiatus (1990)
- I Don't Scare Easily But... (1991)
- Way Of Doom (1991)

=== Splits ===
- Hiatus "Severe Existence" /RMR (1990)
- Hiatus "Blind Justice For All" / Embittered (1992)
- Hiatus/Fleas And Lice (1992)
- Hiatus/Doom (1994)
- Hiatus/Subcaos (1994)

=== Compilations ===
- They Ain't Seen Nothing Yet (1991)
- Walk Across America (1992)
- Machination World (1993)
- Sons Of Bleeuargh 2 (1993)
- Die Human Race (1996)

=== Live albums ===
- Hiatus/Sauna/Svart Snö - Live in Copenhagen (1992)

=== Demos ===
- The Frightening Men Story (1989)
- In My Mind (1990)
