= Whine =

Whine may refer to:

- Whine (album), a 1997 album by Scorn
- Whine (song), a 2023 song by Mya featuring Bounty Killer

== See also ==
- Wine (disambiguation)
