= Richard Carey =

Richard Carey may refer to:

- Richard Carey (politician) (1929–2013), American politician from Maine
- Richard Carey (American football) (born 1968), former American football defensive back
- Richard Adams Carey (born 1951), American writer
- Richard E. Carey (1928–2025), American Marine Corps Lieutenant General
- Rick Carey (born 1963), American swimmer
- Richard Carey, American thrash metal musician for the band RUIN (band)
