= Anamnesis (Scorn album) =

Compilation album by Scorn
- Released: January 26, 1999
- Recorded: July 17, 1994 – 1997
- Studio: BBC Studios, Mardivale; The Box, Birmingham, England, UK
- Genre: Illbient, dub
- Length: 68:04
- Label: Invisible

Scorn chronology
Whine (1997)	Anamnesis (1999)	Greetings from Birmingham (2000)

Professional ratings
Review scores
Source	Rating
AllMusic	3/5 stars

Anamnesis is a compilation album by Scorn, released in 1999 on Invisible Records.

== Track listing ==
All music is composed by Mick Harris

No.	Title	Length
1.	"Almost Human"	9:51
2.	"Maker of Angels"	7:21
3.	"Scorpionic"	5:41
4.	"Geeked" (original version)	7:25
5.	"Get Up"	5:08
6.	"Wallpaper Dub"	6:12
7.	"Trap"	5:04
8.	"Tamper"	4:52
9.	"Beat 2 Version"	4:49
10.	"State of That"	6:33
11.	"Dreamscape" ("Unstable Sidereal Oneiroscopic Mix", by Coil)	5:08

== Personnel ==
Scorn

- Nicholas Bullen – vocals and bass guitar (1–3)
- Mick Harris – instruments, mixing, recording

Production

- Chris Greene – mastering
