= FETO =

FETO may refer to:

- Gülen movement, (Fethullahçı Terör Örgütü: FETÖ), a term used by the government of Turkey to refer to the Islamist fraternal movement led by Fethullah Gülen
- From Enslavement to Obliteration, an album by Napalm Death
