= Zander (album) =

Studio album by Scorn
- Released: February 18, 1997
- Recorded: 1996 at The Box, Birmingham, England, UK
- Genre: Illbient, industrial hip hop, dub
- Length: 50:19
- Label: KK

Scorn chronology
| Logghi Barogghi (1996) | Zander (1997) | Whine (1997) |

Professional ratings
Review scores
| Source | Rating |
|---|---|
| Allmusic | 3/5 stars |

Zander (stylized as [zAndEr]) is the sixth album by Scorn, released on February 18, 1997, through KK Records. For Zander, the band kept pushing the dirty bass and heavy beat sound, subtly changing with each subsequent release. In May 1997, Mick Harris decided to end the band to finish relations with KK Records, and from 1997 to 1999, he was making music with other names and other musicians, until 2000, when returned with the band with the record company Hymen Records for Greetings from Birmingham.

== Track listing ==
All music is composed by Mick Harris.

| No. | Title | Length |
|---|---|---|
| 1. | "Twitcher" | 5:32 |
| 2. | "Well Sorted" | 6:01 |
| 3. | "Strand" | 6:11 |
| 4. | "Wreck Shop" | 5:38 |
| 5. | "Check the Sonic" | 6:10 |
| 6. | "Flick" | 6:15 |
| 7. | "Those Who Know" | 1:06 |
| 8. | "Not Answering" | 5:01 |
| 9. | "416" | 8:25 |

== Personnel ==
- Anthony Burnham – photography
- Mick Harris – instruments, mixing
