= Plan B (Scorn album) =

Studio album by Scorn
- Released: August 30, 2002
- Recorded: April 5, 2001 at The Box, Birmingham, UK
- Genre: Illbient, industrial hip hop, dub
- Length: 66:19
- Label: Hymen
- Producer: Mick Harris

Scorn chronology
Greetings From Birmingham (2000)	Plan B (2002)	List of Takers (2004)

Professional ratings
Review scores
Source	Rating
Allmusic	4/5 stars

Plan B is the eighth album by Scorn, released in August 2002 through Hymen Records. In 2000, Mick Harris returned with the band with the record company Hymen Records for Greetings from Birmingham, but eventually Harris parted ways with Hymen in 2002 after the release of Plan B. The intervening years since saw a break in recorded output (except the release of List of Takers, a live radio jam on Vivo Records in 2004) with live dates popping up periodically.

== Track listing ==
All music is composed by Mick Harris

No.	Title	Length
1.	"Black Belt"	4:40
2.	"Table of Charges"	4:41
3.	"Put Your Weight on It"	6:08
4.	"Boss"	7:47
5.	"Channel"	5:18
6.	"Sleep When Home"	7:31
7.	"Dangler"	5:16
8.	"The Snow Hill"	5:41
9.	"Way It Is"	6:49
10.	"Nekcrik"	5:06
11.	"Doors"	7:22

== Personnel ==
- Mick Harris – instruments, production, mixing

Production

- Anthony Child – production and mixing (5)
- Karl O'Connor – production and mixing (10)
- Salt – cover art

== Critical reception ==
Allmusic gave Plan B four stars out of five. The BBC review praised the production and said "Listen to this in your tank".
