= Logghi Barogghi =

Studio album by Scorn
- Released: August 20, 1996
- Recorded: December 1995–January 1996 at The Box, Birmingham, England, UK
- Genre: Illbient, dub, industrial hip hop
- Length: 74:27
- Label: Earache

Scorn chronology
Gyral (1995)	Logghi Barogghi (1996)	Zander (1997)

Professional ratings
Review scores
Source	Rating
Allmusic	3/5 stars
Alternative Press	4/5 stars

Logghi Barogghi is the fifth album by Scorn, released on August 20, 1996, through Earache Records. The album's departure from the band's early sound eventually led to Mick Harris parting ways with Earache after its release, both sides apparently having been unhappy with how the project was being handled. After leaving Earache Records, Scorn kept pushing the dirty bass and heavy beat sound, subtly changing with each release.

== Track listing ==
All music is composed by Mick Harris.

No.	Title	Length
0.	"Untitled"	2:32
1.	"Look at That"	4:58
2.	"Do the Geek"	7:43
3.	"The Next Days"	6:27
4.	"Spongie"	5:46
5.	"Out Of"	6:29
6.	"It's On"	5:00
7.	"Logghi Barogghi"	0:57
8.	"Black Box II"	5:10
9.	"Nut"	5:04
10.	"A Mission"	6:04
11.	"Pithering Twat"	5:24
12.	"Fumble"	6:38
13.	"Weakener"	4:16
14.	"Go"	1:59

== Personnel ==
- Anthony Burnham – photography
- Mick Harris – instruments, mixing
