= List of Takers =

Live album by Scorn
- Released: April 28, 2004
- Recorded: October 2003 at Bedroom Box, Birmingham, England, UK
- Genre: Illbient, dub
- Length: 70:44
- Label: Vivo

Scorn chronology
| Plan B (2002) | List of Takers (2004) | Stealth (2007) |

List of Takers is a live album by Scorn, released on April 28, 2004 through Vivo. After the release of 2002's Plan B, Mick Harris parted ways with Hymen Records in 2002. The intervening years since saw a break in recorded output (except the release of this album, List of Takers, a live radio jam on Vivo Records in 2004) with live dates popping up periodically.

== Track listing ==
All music is composed by Mick Harris

| No. | Title | Length |
|---|---|---|
| 1. | "List Of Takers - Versions And More" | 70:44 |

== Personnel ==
- Mick Harris – instruments
