= Defecation (band) =

British deathgrind band

- Origin: Birmingham, England
- Genres: Death metal, grindcore
- Years active: 1987–1992, 2000–present
- Label: Nuclear Blast
- Members: Mitch Harris
- Past members: Mick Harris
- Website: Defecation @ Nuclear Blast

Defecation is a deathgrind side project that Righteous Pigs guitarist Mitch Harris and then-Napalm Death drummer Mick Harris formed in 1987. Mitch Harris played guitar, bass and sang while Mick Harris played drums and also sang, until Mick left the group shortly after the release of their first album, Purity Dilution.

== Biography ==
Before Defecation started, Mick drummed for Napalm Death, and Mitch played guitar for Righteous Pigs. The two were pen pals and decided to start the project. They formed Defecation in 1987, and released Purity Dilution on Nuclear Blast Records in 1989. Shortly after the release of Purity Dilution, Mick left the band, as well as Napalm Death, in 1991. Mitch Harris and Jesse Pintado joined Napalm Death, and Defecation was put on hold for a while. Fourteen years after the first album was recorded, Mitch made the second album by himself, entitled Intention Surpassed.

In 2019, Spanish label Metal Bastard Enterprises used the band's name and logo to promote a musically unrelated scam artist's album named Killing with Kindness; the album was marketed by the label as Defecation's new album, tricking many fans into acquiring it, to extremely negative reception. Mitch Harris later issued a statement on Napalm Death's Facebook page in which he confirmed that neither he nor Mick Harris have recorded this album, while also apologizing for anyone who bought it.

== Discography ==
- Purity Dilution (1989, Nuclear Blast)
- Intention Surpassed (2003, Nuclear Blast)
