= Doom (British band) =

English crust punk band

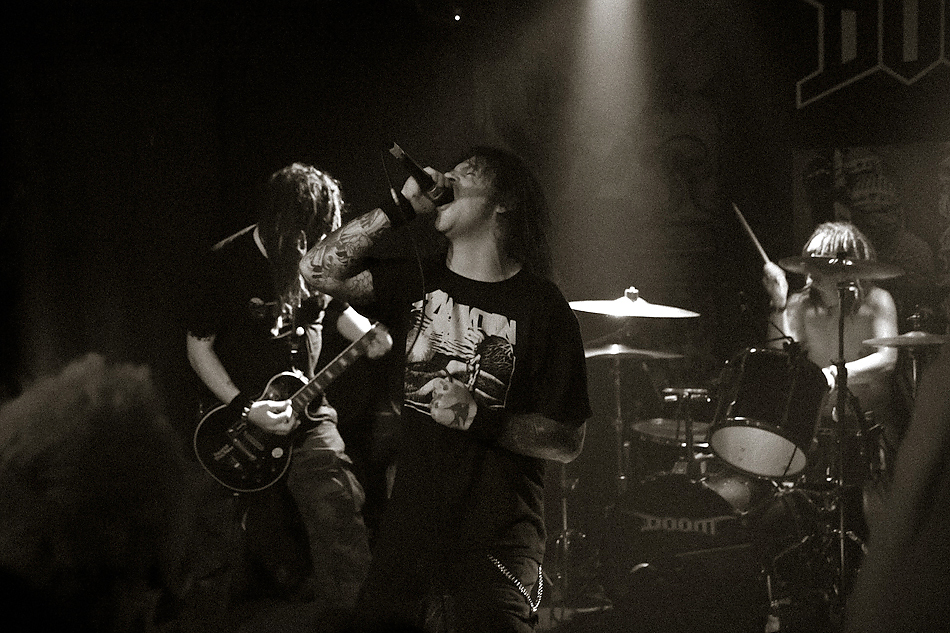
- Doom performing in 2011

Background information
- Also known as: The Subverters (1987)
- Origin: Birmingham, England
- Genres: Crust punk, hardcore punk
- Years active: 1987–1990, 1992–2005, 2010–present
- Labels: Black Cloud, Peaceville, Profane Existence, Moshpit Tragedy
- Members: Bri Doom; Tony "Stick" Dickens; Scoot; Denis
- Past members: Jon Pickering; Jason Hodges; Mick Harris; Pete Nash; Dave Talbot; Tom Croft; Paul "Mall" Mallen; Wayne Southworth; Chris Gascoigne

Doom are an English hardcore punk band from Birmingham whose first lineup were together from 1987 to 1990. Despite its short existence, the band is considered pivotal in the rise of crust punk, a genre of punk rock that takes influence and elements from extreme metal. They recorded for Peaceville Records and are cited as an early precursor to grindcore. Doom were also a favourite of BBC Radio DJ John Peel.

== History ==
=== Early history ===
Doom began as The Subverters with Jon Pickering (bass/vocals), Bri Doom (guitar) and Jason Hodges (drums). After Jason was replaced by new drummer Mick Harris the band changed their name to Doom.

This lineup played several concerts in a crossover metal style. Bri and Jon decided this wasn't the direction they wanted the band to move in. Consequently, they left the crossover style of heavy metal music and decided to move toward a Discharge-influenced crust punk-style that Doom became known for. At this time, Pickering dropped bass to concentrate on vocals, and Pete Nash replaced him on bass. Harris also left the band and was replaced by Tony "Stick" Dickens. The band began rehearsing with this line-up in mid 1987.

=== 1987–1990 ===
About this time a small label called Peaceville Records was starting up. They heard about Doom through word of mouth and asked if they were interested in contributing songs to the first Peaceville compilation A Vile Peace. Doom went into the studio to record their first demo on 28 August 1987. Nash unfortunately broke his wrist just before Doom's recording debut, so bass player Jim Whitley (of Napalm Death and Ripcord fame) filled in on the recording. Three songs were recorded (two of which appeared on A Vile Peace).

On the strength of this first recording Peaceville asked Doom if they would record a full LP for them, which they agreed to do. The War is Big Business demo was recorded on 27 November 1987, which the band sold as a cassette at gigs. In February 1988, Doom went into "Rich Bitch" studios and recorded 21 songs for their debut album War Crimes (Inhuman Beings). All this time the band gigged constantly in the UK building up a following on the way. Another demo Domesday was also produced.

At the end of 1988, due to personal commitments Bri announced that he would be leaving the band. He stayed long enough to record the split LP Bury the Debt – Not the Dead (with Swedish band No Security) on the Peaceville label. The Police Bastard EP (on discarded records) was also recorded at the same session. Doom were also invited to record two sessions for Radio One's John Peel show around this point. Bri left the band in April 1989 after completing a lengthy European tour.

Doom continued with different guitarists, most notably with Dave Talbot who co-founded UK doom metal band Solstice with Sore Throat's vocalist Rich Walker, but did not settle with four members for long playing numerous gigs as a three piece, as Pickering turned to vocal and guitar duties. This line up continued until a final split in August 1990. Following the group's demise Pickering formed Cain, then Police Bastard, whilst drummer Stick and bassist Nash joined Extreme Noise Terror. Stick then joined DIRT and Nash joined Filthkick and Cain.

=== 1990s ===
The band reformed in 1992 with the earlier line up of Bri, Jon, Pete and Stick. They toured Japan and recorded a 12-inch of new songs released on the label Vinyl Japan. This proved to be the last recording with this line up. About this point the band almost split up but Bri and Stick decided to continue with two new members. These being Tom Croft from Genital Deformities on vocals and Paul "Mall" Mallen on bass guitar. This line up recorded the split album with Selfish and a split 7-inch EP with Hiatus. Mall left shortly afterwards (an amicable parting). He was replaced by bassist Scoot from Largactyl.

This line up recorded the split 7-inch EP Doomed to Extinction with Extinction of Mankind, the Fuck Peaceville double LP, and the Hail to Sweden 7-inch EP. This is also the line up who appear on the Videodoom video on MCR recorded on a European tour in 1994

A tour of Scandinavia was organised for September 1995, however Scoot decided not to go due to problems at home, so he was replaced by Denis Boardman of Blood Sucking Freaks, moving to second guitar after the tour. Tom Croft also left just before the tour and was replaced by Wayne Southworth (also of Blood Sucking Freaks). While on the Scandinavian tour Doom recorded the Monarchy Zoo 7-inch EP at Sunlight Studios.

The band, now composed of, Stick, Bri, Denis, Wayne and Chris, went into the studio in June 1996 and recorded a full LP for Flat Earth, Called Rush Hour of the Gods.

Bri would go on to join Khang, this band then evolving into Lazarus Blackstar. moved to Sweden and formed Murdered Cop and then Gloomy Sunday. Stick is also part of the band RUIN. Pickering went on to form Police Bastard and Haxan and Nash later formed Corvus.

=== 2000s ===
On 18 March 2005 Wayne Southworth (lead singer) was found dead in his home by a friend. The cause of death was an epileptic seizure.

The band then played at the 1 in 12 club in Bradford, England one last time without Wayne Southworth in tribute to their friend.

In 2013 Doom toured Canada for the first time and released a new track ("Stripped, Whipped & Crucified, Part I") from their upcoming LP ("Corrupt Fucking System") on a compilation entitled "25 Years of Crust" via Moshpit

== Members ==
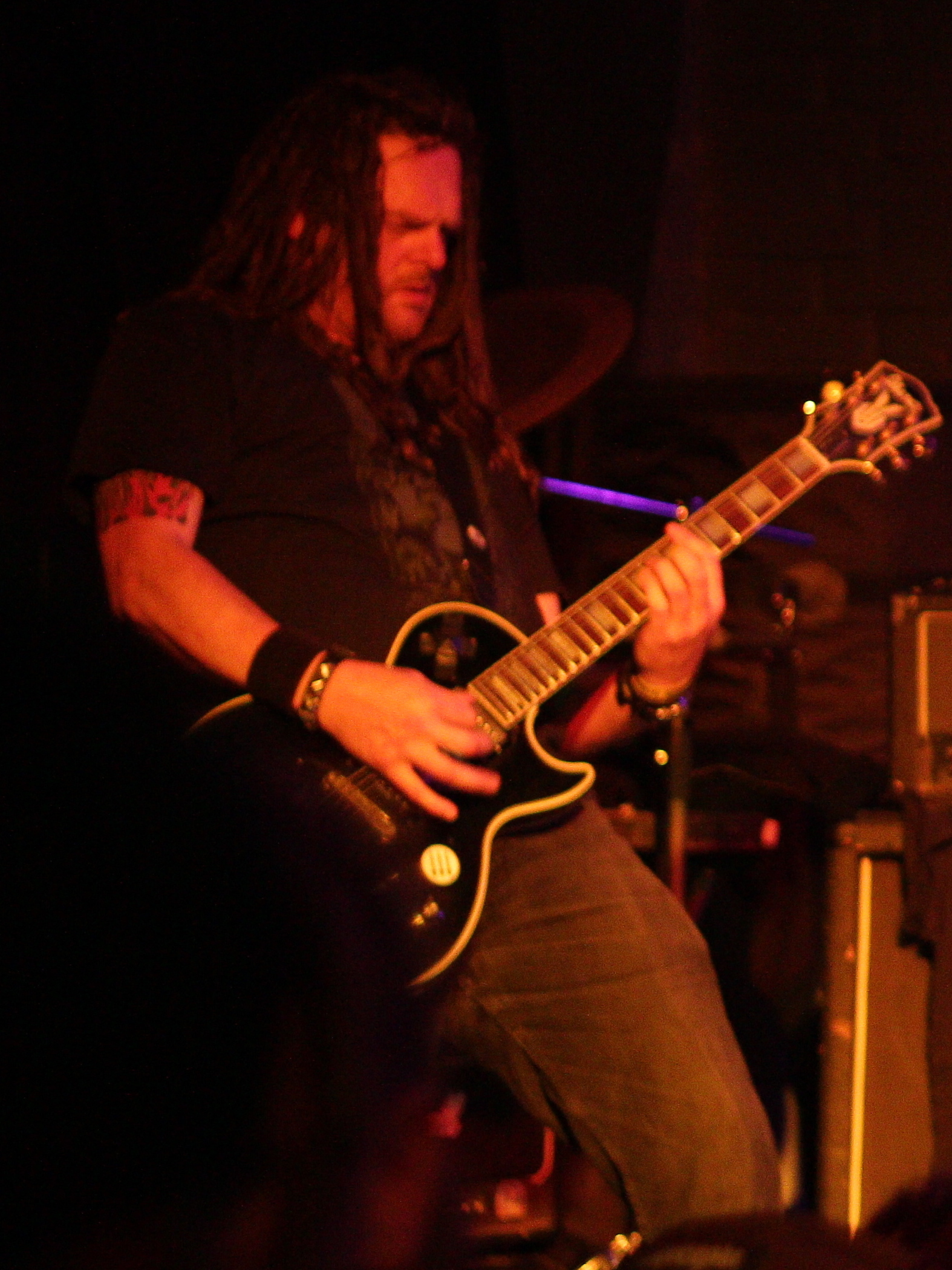
Bri Doom

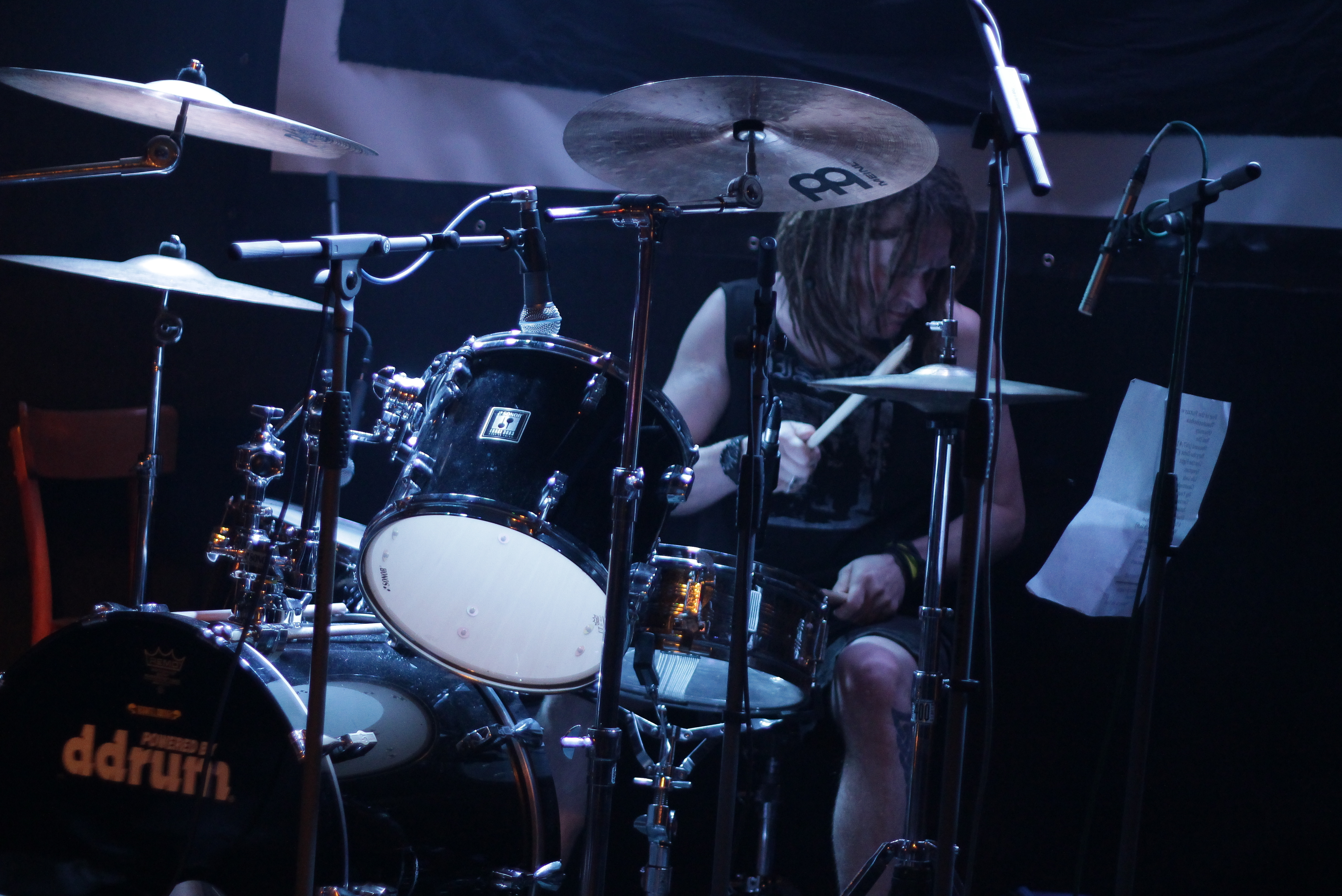
Stick

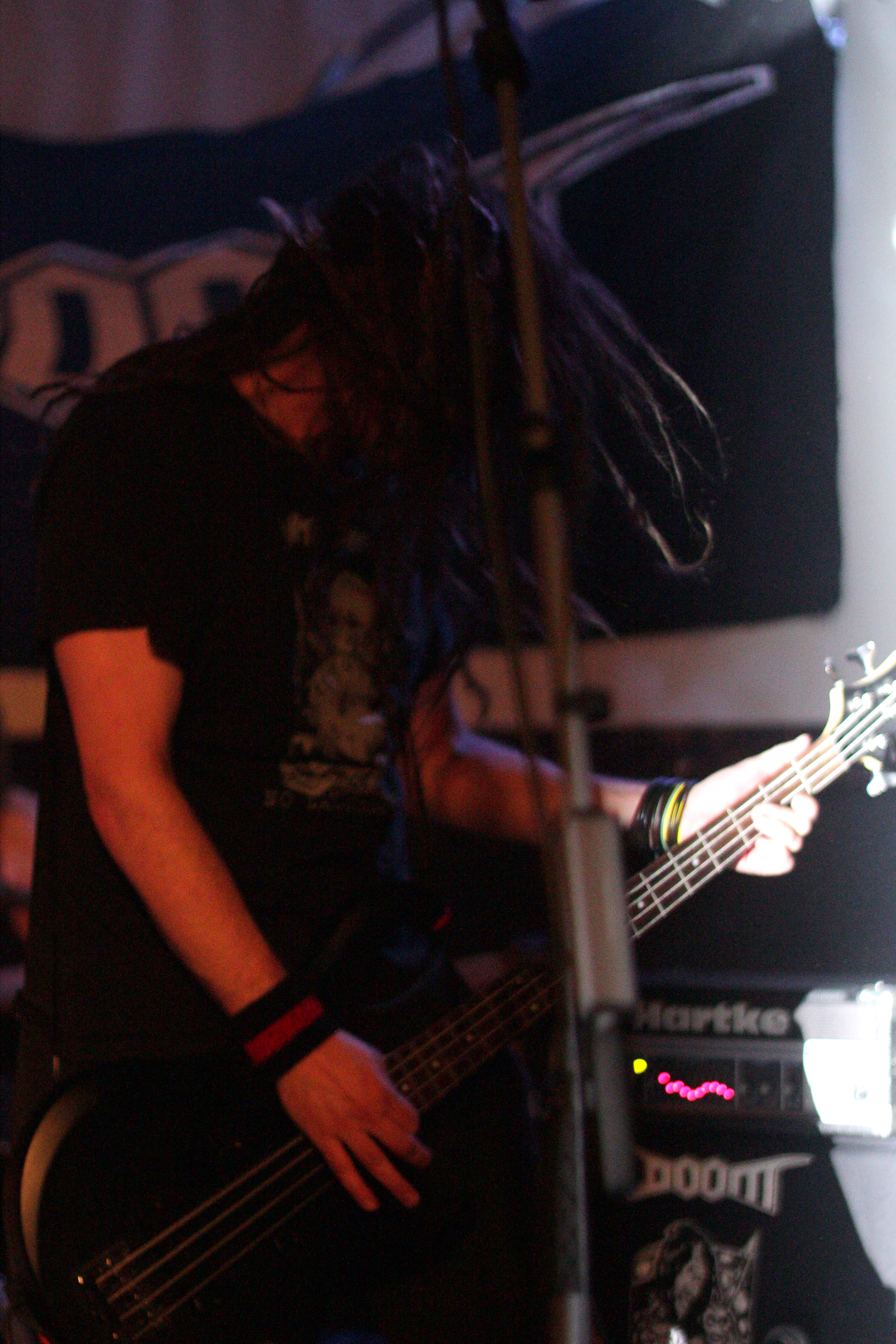
Scoot

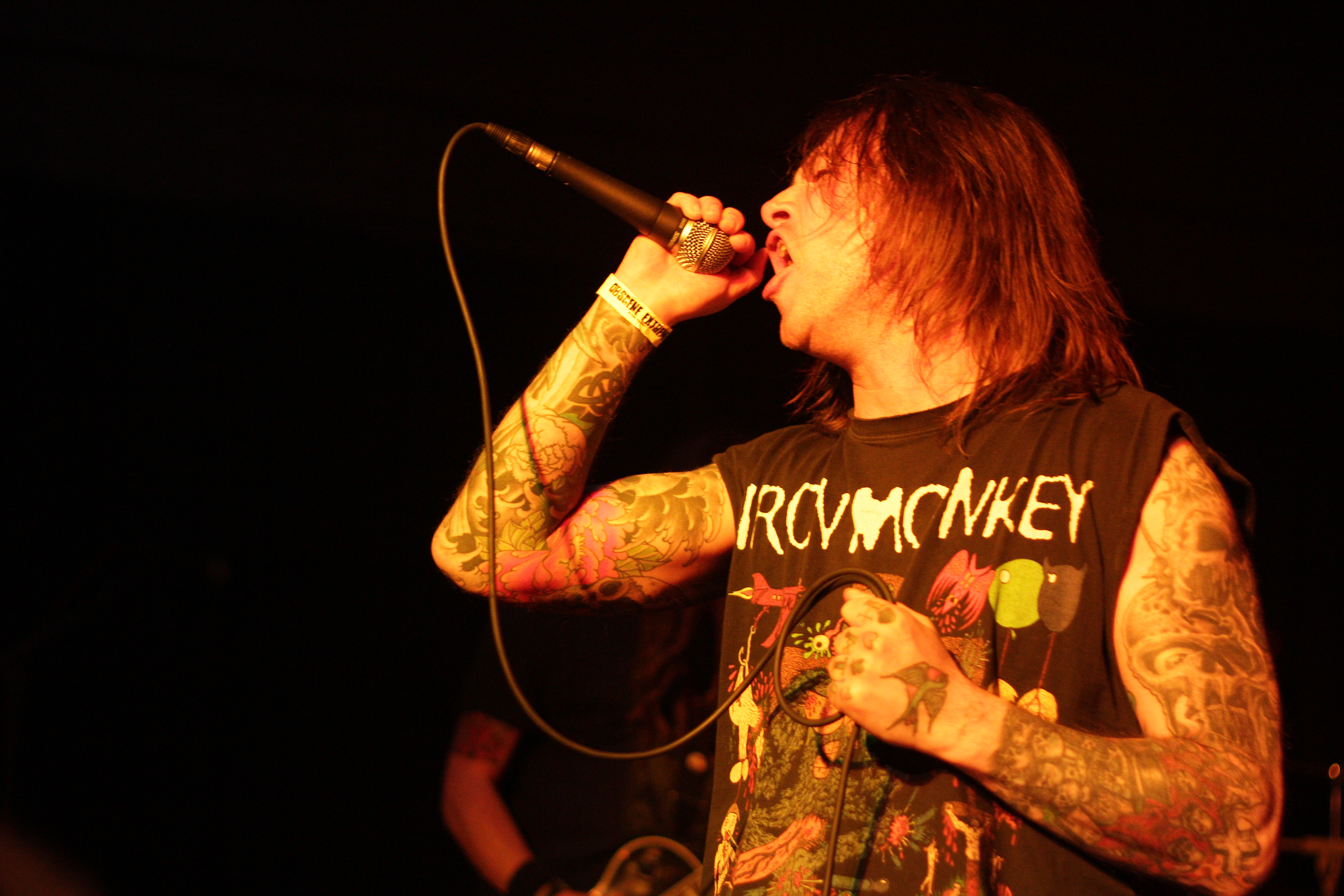
Denis

Current members

- Brian "Bri Doom" Talbot – guitar (1987–1989, 1992–2005, 2010–present)
- Tony "Stick" Dickens – drums (1987–1990, 1992–2005, 2010–present)
- Michael "Scoot" Gladok – bass guitar (1992–1995, 2010–present)
- Denis Boardman – bass guitar (1995), rhythm guitar (1995–2000), lead vocals (2010–present)

Session members

- Jim Whitely – bass guitar (1988)

Former members

- Jon Pickering – lead vocals (1987–1990, 1992), bass guitar (1987), rhythm guitar (1989–1990, 1992), lead guitar (1989–1990)
- Pete Nash – bass guitar (1987–1990, 1992)
- Jason Hodges – drums (1987)
- Mick Harris – drums (1987)
- David Talbot – guitar (1989)
- Tom Croft – lead vocals (1992–1995)
- Paul "Mall" Mallen – bass guitar (1992)
- Wayne Southworth – lead vocals (1995–2005; died 2005)
- Chris Gascoigne – bass guitar (1995–2004)
- Andy Irving – bass guitar (2004–2005)

Timeline

== Discography ==
=== Albums ===
- War Crimes (Inhuman Beings) LP (1988, Peaceville Records)
- Bury the Debt – Not the Dead split LP w/ No Security (1989, Peaceville Records)
- The Greatest Invention LP/CD (1993, Vinyl Japan)
- Pro-Life Control split LP/CD w/ Selfish (1994, Ecocentric Records)
- Rush Hour of the Gods LP/CD (1996, Flat Earth)
- World of Shit LP/CD (2001, Vinyl Japan)
- Corrupt Fucking System LP (2013, Black Cloud)

=== EPs/demos ===
- War is Big Business demo tape (1987, discarded tapes)
- Police Bastard 7-inch (1989, Profane Existence) (More than 20,000 copies sold. Second best selling crust 7-inch, after Aus-Rotten's "Fuck Nazi Sympathy")
- Lost the Fight 7-inch (1993, Flat Earth/Nabate)
- Doomed to Extinction split 7-inch w/ Extinction of Mankind (1994, Ecocentric Records)
- Hail to Sweden 7-inch (1995, Pandora's Box)
- Pissed Robbed & Twatted – Live in Slovenia 7-inch (1996, Nuclear Sun Punk)
- Monarchy Zoo 7-inch/CD EP (1996, Vinyl Japan)
- split 10-inch w/ Cress (1998, Flat Earth)
- Consumed to Death (2015, Black Cloud)

=== Compilations/re-issues ===
- Total Doom CD (1989, Peaceville Records) Jon Pickering (vocals); Bri (guitar); Peter Nash (bass guitar); Stick (drums).
- Doomed from the Start LP/CD (1992, Vinyl Japan)
- Fuck Peaceville 2xLP/CD (1995, Profane Existence)
- Peel Sessions CD (1996, Vinyl Japan)
- Doomed Again (2012, Agipunk)
- 25 Years of Crust digital sampler (2013, Moshpit Tragedy)
- Hardcore '21 CD (2021, WGBM Records)

=== Live ===
- Live in Japan 7-inch (1992, Ecocentric Records)
- Back & Gone Double Live CD and DVD live video (2006, MCR)

=== Compilation appearances ===
- A Vile Peace LP (1987, Peaceville Records)
- Hardcore Holocaust (The 87-88 Peel Sessions) LP (1988, Strange Fruit Records)
- Spleurk! LP (1988, Meantime Records)
- Volnitza: The Worst of the 1 in 12 Club Vol. 6/7 2×LP (1989, 1 in 12 Records)
- Hardcore Holocaust II LP/tape (1990, Strange Fruit Records)
- Vile Vibes CD – (1990, Peaceville Records)
- Hardcore Resistance Tape (1991, Heed the Ball!)
- Endless Struggle: The Worst of the 1 in 12 Club vol. 12/13 double LP (1995, 1 in 12 Records)
- Gay Pride 7-inch (1995, Rugger Bugger Records)
- Aftermath LP/CD (1999, Aftermath Records)
