= Mentally Murdered =

EP by Napalm Death
- Released: 29 August 1989
- Recorded: May 1989
- Studio: Slaughterhouse Studios
- Genre: Deathgrind
- Length: 15:40
- Label: Earache
- Producer: Digby Pearson

Napalm Death chronology
From Enslavement to Obliteration (1988)	Mentally Murdered (1989)	Harmony Corruption (1990)

Professional ratings
Review scores
Source	Rating
Spin Alternative Record Guide	7/10

Mentally Murdered is an EP by the English grindcore band Napalm Death, released in 1989. It was later included on the Harmony Corruption CD and the Death by Manipulation compilation album. On this EP the band's migration to death metal territory is more readily evident than on its previous album. It is the final studio recording with Bill Steer and Lee Dorrian, who simultaneously departed the band due to musical and personality differences.

== Track listing ==
No.	Title	Length
1.	"Rise Above"	2:42
2.	"The Missing Link"	2:17
3.	"Mentally Murdered"	2:11
4.	"Walls of Confinement"	2:56
5.	"Cause and Effect"	1:26
6.	"No Mental Effort"	4:08

- The song Mentally Murdered is a different recording than the version found on From Enslavement to Obliteration.

== Credits ==
=== Napalm Death ===
- Lee Dorrian - vocals
- Bill Steer - guitars
- Shane Embury - bass
- Mick Harris - drums

=== Additional personnel ===
- Colin Richardson - engineering
- SKINNY - cover art
- Napalm Death - production
- Digby Pearson - production

== Charts ==
Chart (1989)	Peak position
UK Indie Chart	6
