= Purity Dilution =

Studio album by Defecation
- Released: 1989, 1990, 1992, 2000
- Genres: Grindcore, death metal
- Length: 26:44; 30:21 (with Granted Wish)
- Label: Nuclear Blast
- Producers: Defecation, Danny Lilker

Defecation chronology
Purity Dilution (1989)	Intention Surpassed (2003)

Alternative cover
- Cover art for the 1992 release

Professional ratings
Review scores
Source	Rating
Allmusic	link

Purity Dilution is the first album released by Defecation, and the only release of the two to have Mick Harris on it. It was released in 1989 on Nuclear Blast Records, and was issued in four different versions:

- The original 1989 release LP/CD
- The 1990 German brown cassette, limited to 666 copies
- The 1992 release with a different cover art and the bonus track Granted Wish
- The 2000 digipak release with Granted Wish

== Track listing ==
1. "Intro-Megaton" – 1:55
2. "Vestige Of Earthly Remains" – 3:00
3. "Life On Planet Earth Is Fucken Cancerous" – 1:26
4. "Contagion" – 2:08
5. "Predominance" – 1:40
6. "Recovery" – 2:23
7. "Side Effects" – 2:15
8. "Mutual Trust" – 2:21
9. "Focus" – 2:18
10. "Popular Belief" – 2:03
11. "Scrutiny" – 2:52
12. "Underestimation" – 2:21
13. "Granted Wish" – 3:36 - Bonus track; only on the 1992 release and the 2000 digipak release

== Credits ==
- Mitch Harris - guitar, bass, vocals
- Mick Harris - drums, vocals
