= Cafe Mor =

Studio album by Scorn
- Released: 15 November 2019
- Label: Ohm Resistance
- Producer: Mick Harris

Scorn chronology
Refuse; Start Fires (2010)	Cafe Mor (2019)	The Only Place (2021)

Cafe Mor is a studio album by Scorn, released in 2019 by Ohm Resistance. It was the first Scorn album in nine years, preceded by Refuse; Start Fires. The track "Talk Whiff" features Jason Williamson of Sleaford Mods on vocals.

== Critical response ==
The album received a positive response from critics. The Quietus described it as "sonically contemptuous, imperious, snide". For Igloo Magazine the album "shows a master at work — honing and developing his signature sound".

== Track listing ==
All music is composed by Mick Harris.

No.	Title	Length
1.	"Elephant"	6:13
2.	"The Lower the Middle Our Bit"	5:03
3.	"Mugwump Tea Room"	6:09
4.	"Never Let It Be Said"	5:43
5.	"Who Are They Which One"	5:45
6.	"Dulse"	6:30
7.	"Talk Whiff" (featuring Jason Williamson)	5:50
8.	"SA70"	7:16
