= Evanescence (Scorn album) =

Studio album by Scorn
- Released: August 23, 1994
- Recorded: Arena Productions, Birmingham, England
- Genre: Illbient, dub, industrial, trip hop
- Length: 63:16
- Label: Earache MOSH 113
- Producer: Scorn

Scorn chronology
Colossus (1993)	Evanescence (1994)	Ellipsis (1995)

Professional ratings
Review scores
Source	Rating
AllMusic	2.5/5 stars
The Encyclopedia of Popular Music	4/5 stars
Kerrang!	4/5 stars

Evanescence is the third album by Scorn, originally released in 1994 on Earache Records. It was remastered along with its remix album and released as a two disc set in 2009. Evanescence is often associated with industrial and experimental music. Nic Bullen left Scorn in 1995 and the band continued on as an essentially solo project for Mick Harris.

== Track listing ==
No.	Title	Length
1.	"Silver Rain Fell"	7:36
2.	"Light Trap"	6:11
3.	"Falling"	4:59
4.	"Automata"	6:17
5.	"Days Passed"	4:33
6.	"Dreamspace"	7:40
7.	"Exodus"	7:17
8.	"Night Tide"	6:07
9.	"The End"	8:01
10.	"Slumber"	4:35

== Accolades ==
Year	Publication	Country	Accolade	Rank
1994	The Wire	United Kingdom	"Albums of the Year"	39
1998	Alternative Press	United States	"The 90 Greatest Albums of the '90s"	82
2000	Terrorizer	United Kingdom	"The 100 Most Important Albums of the 90s"	*
"*" denotes an unordered list.

== Personnel ==
Scorn

- Nic Bullen – bass, sampler, percussion, voice, guitar
- Mick Harris – sampler, drum programming, percussion

Additional musicians and production

- James Plotkin – guitar
- Scorn – production
- Tom Smyth – engineering
- Jon Wakelin – engineering
