= Whine (album) =

Live album by Scorn
- Released: October 21, 1997
- Recorded: May 3, 1997 in Rome, Italy; February, 1997 at The Box, Birmingham, England, UK
- Genre: Illbient, dub
- Length: 72:56
- Label: Invisible

Scorn chronology
Zander (1997)	Whine (1997)	Anamnesis: 1994-97 (1999)

Professional ratings
Review scores
Source	Rating
Allmusic	2.5/5 stars

Whine is a live album by Scorn, released on October 21, 1997, through Invisible Records.

== Track listing ==
All music is composed by Mick Harris.

Whine: Recorded Live in Rome
No.	Title	Length
1.	"Not Answering"	9:54
2.	"Twitcher"	6:02
3.	"Strand"	6:04
4.	"Beat 3"	5:30
5.	"Well Sorted"	6:28
6.	"Check the Sonic"	5:35
7.	"416"	8:08
8.	"Aurora"	6:07

Beat
No.	Title	Length
9.	"Beat 4"	4:16
10.	"Beat 2 Mix"	4:41
11.	"Beat 3 Mix"	5:37
12.	"Who Know Mix"	4:34

== Personnel ==
- Eraldo Bernocchi – guitar (2–8)
- Anthony Burnham – photography
- Chris Greene – mastering
- Mick Harris – instruments, mixing, recording
