= Leaders Not Followers: Part 2 =

Studio album by Napalm Death
- Released: 23 August 2004
- Recorded: June–July 2003
- Studio: Robannas Studios, Birmingham
- Genre: Deathgrind
- Length: 43:09
- Label: Century Media
- Producer: Russ Russell

Napalm Death chronology
Noise for Music's Sake (2003)	Leaders Not Followers: Part 2 (2004)	The Code Is Red...Long Live the Code (2005)

Leaders Not Followers: Part 2 is a cover album by British grindcore band Napalm Death, released in 2004 by Century Media. It contains covers of various hardcore punk and heavy metal songs. Although Jesse Pintado is credited for playing guitars, guitarist Mitch Harris revealed in an interview with The Metal Forge in 2005 that Pintado did not contribute to Leaders Not Followers: Part 2.

== Release ==
Leaders Not Followers: Part 2 marked the band's debut for German heavy metal record label Century Media. The CD version contains a live video clip of the Cryptic Slaughter song Lowlife.

== Reception ==
Professional ratings
Review scores
Source	Rating
AllMusic	3.5/5 stars
Chronicles of Chaos	8/10
CMJ New Music Report	Favourable
Collector's Guide to Heavy Metal	6/10
The Encyclopedia of Popular Music	3/5 stars
Kerrang!	4/5 stars
Punknews.org	5/5 stars
The Metal Forge	8/10
Terrorizer	8.5/10

Damien of Terrorizer described the album as featuring "essentially a 'Who's Who' of extreme music in the 80s", with "Napalm [Death] not only highlight[ing] the links between disparate strains (punk, hardcore, crossover, thrash) but provid[ing] a damned enjoyable 43-minute hellride". Amy Sciarretto of CMJ New Music Report called the album "noisy, loud, brash and fast, just like the originals and just the way we like Napalm Death."

== Track listing ==
No.	Title	Original artist	Length
1.	"Lowlife"	Cryptic Slaughter	2:22
2.	"Face Down in the Dirt"	The Offenders	1:27
3.	"Devastation"	Devastation	2:51
4.	"Messiah"	Hellhammer	3:29
5.	"Victims of a Bomb Raid"	Anti Cimex	2:30
6.	"Night of Pain"	Wehrmacht	4:03
7.	"War's No Fairytale"	Discharge	1:18
8.	"Conform"	Siege	1:58
9.	"Master"	Master	2:23
10.	"Fire Death Fate"	Insanity	3:18
11.	"Riot of Violence"	Kreator	4:40
12.	"Game of the Arseholes"	Anti Cimex	1:23
13.	"Clangor of War"	Massacre	2:32
14.	"Dope Fiend"	Attitude Adjustment	1:36
15.	"I'm Tired"	Die Kreuzen	0:52
16.	"Troops of Doom"	Sepultura	2:29
17.	"Bedtime Story"	Dayglo Abortions	2:24
18.	"Blind Justice"	Agnostic Front	1:06
19.	"Hate, Fear and Power"	Hirax	0:28
Total length:			43:09

== Personnel ==
=== Napalm Death ===
- Mark "Barney" Greenway – lead vocals
- Jesse Pintado – guitars
- Mitch Harris – guitars, backing vocals
- Shane Embury – bass
- Danny Herrera – drums

=== Additional musicians ===
- Jim Whitely – bass (7, 12)

=== Technical personnel ===
- Russ Russell – production
- Simon Efemey – engineering
- Mid – artwork
- Mick Kenney – layout, design
