= Intention Surpassed =

Studio album by Defecation
- Released: January 13, 2003
- Genres: Death metal, grindcore
- Length: 38:57
- Label: Nuclear Blast
- Producer: Russ Russell

Defecation chronology
Purity Dilution (1989)	Intention Surpassed (2003)

Intention Surpassed is the second Defecation album, released in 2003 on Nuclear Blast Records. Unlike the debut album, this release does not feature any contribution from Mick Harris, rather Mitch Harris performed all instruments and vocals on his own.

== Track listing ==
1. Continuum (1:28)
2. Worldly Whys (2:51)
3. Fibre Optical Illusion (3:05)
4. Fever Pitch (3:14)
5. 2/3 Pure (2:58)
6. Under Surveillance (3:13)
7. Cryonically Preserved (3:25)
8. Overself (2:56)
9. Protective Rage (2:36)
10. Granted Wish (3:05)
11. Shortfall (3:00)
12. Incline (3:12)
13. Time Folding Machine (3:54)

== Credits ==
Mitch Harris - guitar, bass, drums, vocals
