= Scorn (band) =

English electronic music group

- Origin: Birmingham, England
- Genres: Post-industrial, illbient, dub, ambient, experimental, industrial metal (early)
- Years active: 1991–1997, 2000–2011, 2019–2022
- Labels: Earache; Ohm Resistance; Vivo; Hymen; Ad Noiseam; Invisible; KK; Possible; Combat
- Spinoff of: Napalm Death
- Past members: Mick Harris; Nicholas Bullen

Scorn is an English electronic music project. The group was formed in the early 1990s as a project of former Napalm Death members Mick Harris and Nic Bullen. Bullen left the group in 1995, and the project continued on a solo project for Harris until 1997. Scorn was relaunched in 2000 and operated until the end of 2011. Harris restarted the project, once again, in 2019, but stopped it in late 2022.

== History ==
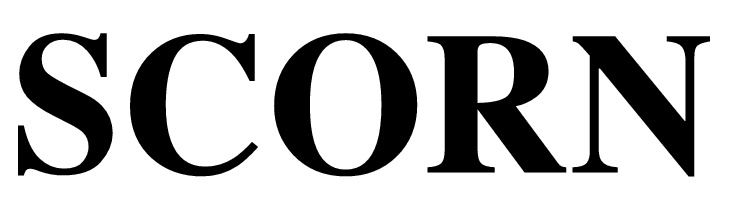
Logo

Scorn was formed in 1991 in Birmingham by drummer Mick Harris and vocalist/bassist Nic Bullen, former members of the grindcore band Napalm Death. Upon Bullen's departure in April 1995, Harris remained the only member of the project. Scorn has often been associated with industrial and experimental music, particularly with their Earache Records-era output between 1991 until 1994. Since the departure of Bullen in 1995, much of the output has been minimalist beats with an emphasis on very deep bass lines, often resembling dub and trip hop in structure.

Justin Broadrick (also a former Napalm Death member) provided guitar for the first LP, Vae Solis. The EP Lick Forever Dog was formed of remixes from the album. Evanescence featured James Plotkin on guitar and was followed by the remix album Ellipsis which featured reworkings by Autechre, Coil, Bill Laswell, Meat Beat Manifesto and Robin Rimbaud. Harris parted ways with Earache after the Logghi Barogghi release, both sides having been unhappy with how the project was being handled.

Many fans of his drumming were confused by the contrast in musical style between Napalm Death and Scorn, but Harris saw it as a natural progression, telling Decibel in 2012: "For the ideas that I had, I needed to make that move. Some people think that it was a crazy move, just as grind was maybe starting to go places, do something, but I've always been an experimenter, still am; I’m someone who just loves sound."

Having left Earache Records, the project kept pushing the heavy bass sound, subtly changing with each release. The downtempo sound gained Harris an underground following and he was seen as an early originator of dubstep. In May 1997, Harris decided to end the project in order to finish relations with KK Records, after they refused to fund a collaboration EP with Bill Laswell as mixing engineer and a rapper Kalil. After pursuing other projects, Harris returned with two critically acclaimed Scorn albums on Hymen Records, Greetings from Birmingham and Plan B. Scorn then released a one track live mix called List of Takers in 2004 on Vivo Records.

Scorn returned in 2007 with Stealth on Ad Noiseam with the CD version released on Kurt Gluck's Ohm Resistance label. Scorn then released 12" records on Combat Records and Record Label Records in 2008. Another full-length album entitled Refuse; Start Fires, again was released on Ohm Resistance in 2010. This album also marked the first time since Bullen left the project that Harris has worked full-on with another musician (excluding the unreleased EP with rapper Kalil from 1997 and a track Scorn did with David Knight on the "Rise|Converge" compilation in 2000), drummer Yan Treasey. On the heels of this full-length, Harris returned with the "Yozza" EP in 2011, again with Treasey.

In November 2011, Harris stated the Scorn project was "put to bed".

On 17 January 2019, the Ohm Resistance label announced that Scorn was back and would release an EP in early 2019, with an album to follow. The EP of four new tracks, was called Feather. The full-length album, Cafe Mor, was released in November and featured a collaboration with Jason Williamson of Sleaford Mods. Daniele Antezza of Dadub mastered the album. Harris intended to tour in 2020 with a new Akai MPC liveset but was forced to cancel due to the COVID-19 pandemic. He then released a studio album, The Only Place in 2021, with one track featuring a collaboration with Kool Keith. In June 2022 Mick Harris teased new upcoming Scorn album with guitars by Justin Broadrick plus contributions from Shane Embury. But in August 2023 Mick Harris posted an update that "Scorn is dead" again since late 2022 and "it was a bad mistake bringing it back after I stopped it in 2012". The final Scorn performance was in October 2022 at Kirkgate Centre, Shipley, England.

== Members ==
=== Former members ===
- Mick Harris - electronics (1991–1997, 2000–2011, 2019–2022), drums (1991–1994), backing vocals (1991–1992)
- Nic Bullen - vocals, bass, electronics (1991–1995), guitar (1992–1994)

=== Former session/touring musicians ===
- Justin Broadrick - guitar (1991–1992, 2022) (on Vae Solis album (1992), unreleased 2022 album)
- Pat McCahan - guitar (1992) (live)
- Paul Neville - guitar (1992) (on Peel Session 1992 and "Lament" from Lament (1993) EP)
- James Plotkin - guitar, guitar synthesizer (1994) (on Evanescence (1994) album, Dutch Radio Live Studio Session archive live EP (2021, recorded 1994), Peel Session 1994 and live)
- Nick Garnett - didgeridoo (1994) (on "Exodus" from Evanescence (1994) album)
- Umar Bin Hassan - rap (1997) (on unreleased 1997 EP)
- David Knight - guitar (2000) (on track "Stinger" from Rise|Converge (2000) compilation)
- Ian Treacy - drums (2009–2011) (on Refuse;Start Fires album (2010) (almost all tracks) and "Piper" from Yozza (2011) EP)
- Jason Williamson - rap (2019) (on "Talk Whiff" from Cafe Mor (2019) album)
- Kool Keith - rap (2021) (on "Distortion" (2021) single and "Distortion" from The Only Place (2021) album)
- Kurt Gluck aka Submerged - bass (2021) (on "Distortion" (2021) single and "Distortion" from The Only Place (2021) album)
- Shane Embury - bass (2022) (on unreleased 2022 album)

== Discography ==
=== Albums ===
- 1992 - Vae Solis (Earache)
- 1993 - Colossus (Earache)
- 1994 - Evanescence (Earache)
- 1995 - Gyral (Earache)
- 1996 - Logghi Barogghi (Earache)
- 1997 - Zander (Invisible)
- 2000 - Greetings from Birmingham (Hymen Records)
- 2002 - Plan B (Hymen Records)
- 2004 - List of Takers (Vivo)
- 2007 - Stealth (Ad Noiseam, Ohm Resistance)
- 2010 - Refuse; Start Fires (Ohm Resistance)
- 2019 - Cafe Mor (Ohm Resistance)
- 2021 - The Only Place (Ohm Resistance)

=== Live albums ===
- 1997 - Whine (Invisible)

=== Remix albums ===
- 1995 - Ellipsis (Earache)

=== Compilation albums ===
- 1999 - Anamnesis: 1994-97 (Invisible)

=== Singles & EPs ===
- 1992 - Lick Forever Dog (Earache)
- 1992 - Deliverance (Earache)
- 1993 - White Irises Blind (Earache)
- 1993 - Lament (Dying Earth Records)
- 1994 - Silver Rain Fell (Earache)
- 1995 - Falling / The End (Remixes) (Scorn Recordings)
- 1995 - Stairway (Scorn Recordings)
- 1996 - Leave It Out (Possible)
- 2000 - Imaginaria Award (Hymen Records)
- 2002 - Governor (Hymen Records)
- 2007 - Whistle for It (ÜNE (r)ecords)
- 2008 - Super Mantis (Combat Recordings)
- 2008 - Super Mantis Remixes (Combat Recordings)
- 2009 - In The Margins (Record Label Records)
- 2009 - Gravel Bed (Combat Recordings)
- 2010 - Super Mantis / Gravel Bed (Remixes) (Combat Recordings)
- 2011 - Yozza (Ohm Resistance)
- 2019 - Feather (Ohm Resistance)
- 2021 - Distortion (Kool Keith + Scorn + Submerged, Ohm Resistance)
- 2021 - Dutch Radio Live Studio Session (recorded 5 September 1994)
