= Subsonic 2: Bass Terror =

Studio album by Bill Laswell/Nicholas James Bullen
- Released: March 14, 1995
- Recorded: 1994
- Studio: Greenpoint (Brooklyn); 'In Limbo' (UK)
- Genre: Ambient, electronic
- Length: 52:22
- Label: Sub Rosa
- Producer: Nicholas Bullen, Bill Laswell

Bill Laswell chronology
Akasha (1995)	Subsonic 2: Bass Terror (1995)	Funkcronomicon (1995)

Professional ratings
Review scores
Source	Rating
Allmusic	2.5/5 stars

Subsonic 2: Bass Terror is an album by Bill Laswell and Nicholas Bullen, released on March 14, 1995, by Sub Rosa. It is the second release in the Subsonic series, a succession of split albums produced by different artists focusing on guitar soundscapes.

== Track listing ==
No.	Title	Writer(s)	Artist	Length
1.	"Bass Terror Tetragrammaton"	Laswell	Bill Laswell	15:15
2.	"Nocturnal Crawl"	Bullen	Nicholas Bullen	18:38
3.	"Again and Again"	Bullen	Nicholas Bullen	18:29

== Personnel ==
Adapted from the Subsonic 2: Bass Terror liner notes.

Musicians

- Nicholas Bullen – prepared bass guitar, electronics and producer (2, 3)
- Neil Griffiths – prepared bass guitar (3)
- Bill Laswell – instruments and producer (1)

Technical personnel

- Guy Marc Hinant – editing
- Layng Martine – assistant engineer (1)
- Manuel Mohino – mastering
- Robert Musso – engineering (1)

== Release history ==
Region	Date	Label	Format	Catalog
Belgium	1995	Sub Rosa	CD	SR 82
