= The Only Place (Scorn album) =

Studio album by Scorn
- Released: 16 June 2021
- Label: Ohm Resistance
- Producer: Mick Harris

Scorn chronology
| Cafe Mor (2019) | The Only Place (2021) |

The Only Place is an album by Scorn, released in 2021 by Ohm Resistance. Mick Harris commented "The album was made with the only place in mind where I can let go of all the hatred, anger, and darkness that are what fuel Scorn".

The track "Distortion" is a collaboration of Mick Harris with Kool Keith and Submerged. It was released as an EP with four mixes and a fifth, longer mix was brought out on the album. Regarding Kool Keith's lyrics, Harris commented "I knew that he’d nail something, and it’s as simple as that". In June 2021, the album was released and Harris shared the track "At One Point" exclusively via The Wire.

== Critical response ==
The album received positive responses from critics. The Sleeping Shaman review said "The Only Place is an album to get lost in, to focus a mood on, rather than put on for sheer instant gratification". Igloo Magazine admired the "mangled, rugged and exploratory sonic displays". The Quietus commented "The Only Place demonstrates anew that there is such a thing as a signature Scorn sound – primarily instrumental, driven by dub's celebration of bass, beats and space, at once weirdly comforting and with a strange, forbidding edge".

== Track listing ==
All music is composed by Mick Harris.

| No. | Title | Length |
|---|---|---|
| 1. | "Ends" | 4:37 |
| 2. | "French Field Middle of Night" | 5:02 |
| 3. | "Mates Corner" | 4:18 |
| 4. | "At One Point" | 5:28 |
| 5. | "Thanks for Getting Back" | 4:56 |
| 6. | "After Tasting" | 3:40 |
| 7. | "Tick" | 5:13 |
| 8. | "Something That Was" | 5:09 |
| 9. | "Distortion" | 4:57 |
| 10. | "Don't and Never Have" | 4:28 |
