= Punk is dead =

Punk Is Dead or Punk's Dead may refer to:

- Punk's Dead, a 2015 American comedy/drama film directed by James Merendino
- "Punk's Dead", a song from the album Heavy Jelly by Soft Play
- "Punk Is Dead", a song by Crass
- "Punk's Dead, Let's Fuck", a track on the EP Punk's Dead Let's Fuck and the album We Are Fuck You by the Finger
- "Punk Is Dead", a track on Rocketfuel by Peter Pan Speedrock.

== See also ==
- Punks Not Dead
- The Only Good Punk... Is a Dead One
