= Colossus (Scorn album) =

Studio album by Scorn
- Released: June 1993
- Recorded: December 1992–January 1993 at Jasmine Cafe Studio, Birmingham, England, UK
- Genre: Illbient; industrial; industrial metal; post-metal; dark ambient; dub
- Length: 68:31
- Label: Earache MOSH 91
- Producer: Scorn

Scorn chronology
| Vae Solis (1992) | Colossus (1993) | Evanescence (1994) |

Professional ratings
Review scores
| Source | Rating |
|---|---|
| AllMusic | 2.5/5 stars |
| The Encyclopedia of Popular Music | 3/5 stars |

Colossus is the second album by Scorn, released in 1993 on Earache Records. It possesses elements of industrial and experimental music.

== Critical reception ==
Trouser Press wrote that "Harris and Bullen back away from overkill on Colossus, loading on moody synth and distressing vocal samples to create an ominous modernist sound similar to God and Ice." Perfect Sound Forever wrote: "Better than their awkward debut, and not as dance floor trend-following monotonous as they would later become, this is a pretty fine album from what is probably Earache's most widely respected band."

== Track listing ==
| No. | Title | Length |
|---|---|---|
| 1. | "Endless" | 7:26 |
| 2. | "Crimson Seed" | 7:54 |
| 3. | "Blackout" | 6:21 |
| 4. | "The Sky Is Loaded" | 5:31 |
| 5. | "Nothing, Hunger" | 5:47 |
| 6. | "Beyond" | 7:24 |
| 7. | "Little Angel" | 4:48 |
| 8. | "White Irises Blind" | 6:08 |
| 9. | "Scorpionic" | 4:38 |
| 10. | "Nights Ash Black" | 8:01 |
| 11. | "Sunstroke" | 4:33 |

== Personnel ==
- Mick Harris – drums, drum programming, sampler, percussion,
- Nic Bullen – bass, sampler, percussion, voice, guitar
- Scorn – production, artwork (sleeve)
- Jon Wakelin – engineer, additional programming
