= Electro Hippies =

English thrashcore band

- Origin: St Helens/Wigan, England
- Genres: Thrashcore; crust punk
- Years active: 1985–1989
- Labels: Peaceville; Necrosis
- Past members: Jeffrey Walker; Simon; Bruno (Brian Rylance); Andy Barnard; Kate; Phil; Dom Murphy; Whitey

Electro Hippies were an English thrashcore band formed in St Helens/Wigan, England, in 1985.

Though they were short-lived and underground through their career, their music influenced many future crust, hardcore punk, and grindcore bands. The band relied heavily on low bass end sounds to create their low-fi, primitively produced music. They also incorporated elements of heavy metal and have been described as "proto-grindcore". The band strongly embraced the D.I.Y. (do it yourself) ethic which was very common among many early crust punk bands. The band's lyrics spoke heavily about animal rights and vegetarianism. A recurring lyrical theme on each LP targeted the McDonald's corporation, evidenced by the lyrics to "Run Ronald" and "Scum".

The band were supported by John Peel for whom they recorded a radio session in 1987, released as an EP by Strange Fruit Records the same year.

The Electro Hippies included Jeff Walker (guitar, vocals) in their ranks. He later joined extreme metal band Carcass. When Walker joined Carcass full-time, Simon (drums) and Andy (guitar) took over vocal duties. Eventually, the band split up in 1989, playing one last gig and releasing the show as their final album.

== Discography ==
Chart placings shown are from the UK Indie Chart.

- 1986 Play Loud or Not at All Flat Earth Records (Generic/Electro Hippies split LP)
- 1987 The Only Good Punk... Is A Dead One LP. Peaceville Records
- 1987 The Peel Sessions 12". Strange Fruit Records (No. 10)
- 1989 Live LP. Peaceville Records (No. 7)
- 1989 Play Fast Or Die 12". Necrosis Records (No. 19). Re-issue of the band's half of the split LP with Generic
- 1989 The Peaceville Recordings LP/CD. Peaceville Records
- 1989 "Mega Armageddon Death Pt.3" / "You Suffer" 7". Split single with Napalm Death included with initial copies of the "Grindcrusher" compilation LP on Earache Records
- 2002 The Only Good Punk CD. Peaceville Records

During their short career, they also appeared on many compilations, such as A Vile Peace, Digging in Water, the Peel sessions sampler, and Vile Vibes.
