= Punks Not Dad =

British comedy punk band formed in Cardiff, Wales

- Origin: Cardiff, Wales
- Genres: Punk rock
- Years active: 2008–present
- Label: Boss Tuneage
- Members: Dan Nichols (Sid Life Crisis); Mike Mole (Johnny Cardigan); Chris Walker (Joe Strimmer); Steve Jones (Adrian Viles)
- Website: www.punksnotdad.com

Punks Not Dad are a British comedy punk band who formed in Cardiff, Wales in late 2008. The name is word-play on the album Punks Not Dead. The four band members were all in their mid to late 40s when they formed and their songs are written from a middle-aged father's perspective referencing sheds, flat-pack furniture and Man flu. The music they play is described as "Dad Punk". They are one of the leading bands of the mature musicians "Rock-Til-You-Drop" movement, and were heavily featured in an article on the subject in The Times in mid 2010. Several of their videos have featured the Welsh TV presenter and actress, Lisa Rogers.

== Career ==
The band was formed in 2008 by Sid Life Crisis and Johnny Cardigan. The former is also a member of the skiffle band, Railroad Bill, and the latter had been one half the comedy duo the Tracy Brothers alongside the novelist and actor Mark Billingham. The Tracy Brothers presented the Children's BBC TV series What's That Noise! and appeared in several of the original BBC Radio 1 series of The Mary Whitehouse Experience. Cardigan and Life Crisis were brothers in law and discovered a shared love of 1977-style British punk rock. They started writing together via email as Cardigan lived in Brighton, England and Life Crisis in Cardiff. The other members, Joe Strimmer and Adrian Viles joined after the band was offered its first gig. Strimmer is also a member of Railroad Bill.

Punks Not Dad quickly recorded their first album We Are The Dads (2010) and were signed by the independent record label, Boss Tuneage. The songs all deal with aspects of the middle-aged male condition, borrowing riffs from punk bands such as The Clash and Sham 69 in an attempt to speak for the same generation thirty years on. The album's title track expands the idea that the original punk generation now feels just as marginalised by young people, as they once did by their own parents.

"The kids don't understand us,
They think we're full of sh*te,
But we are the Dads,
And the Dads are alright!"

Several songs from the album received radio play including "Gaye Adverts Eyes", played by Tom Robinson for BBC Radio 6 Music, and dealing with Life Crisis' teenage crush on the bass player of 1970s punk band The Adverts. The album was described as "Genius" by TV Smith the Adverts former lead singer.

In mid 2009, the band released their first single "In Me Shed", which was accompanied by a promotional video featuring TV presenter Lisa Rogers, whom they met whilst being interviewed on Radio Wales in December 2009. The song won the award for Song of the Year at The Rock-Til-You-Drop Awards. The song was also made the 'Official Anthem of the Shed of the Year 2009, by the Readers' Sheds website and was cited as the campaign song for novelist Chris Cleave's 'Down with Kids' column in The Guardian in January 2010.

During 2010, they performed at Glastonbury Festival and played regular gigs with bluegrass act Hayseed Dixie. In their live shows Punks Not Dad are noted for encouraging their audience to assemble an IKEA bedside table during their performance. The audience is also encouraged to write graffiti on the assembled table.

In July 2010, they were heavily featured in an article in The Times, which dealt with the emergence of new middle-aged rock and punk bands.

Three of their song lyrics ("The Boy Looked at Johnny", "Gaye Advert's Eyes" and "Where is My Love Song?") were also included in the publication Punk Rock Saved My Ass - an anthology edited by Terena Scott and Jane Mackay.

In February 2011, a new video for the song "I Can't Get It Up" (an intentional double-entendre title, the song dealing with the erection of flatpack furniture) was released - again featuring Lisa Rogers. This video was intended to promote the band's four-track "Retail Therapy EP" released in March 2011.

== Discography ==
- "Allen Key in the UK" (2008) - band-produced, four-track EP
- We Are The Dads! (2009) - album released by Boss Tuneage
- "In Me Shed" b/w "Father's Day" (2009) - single released by Boss Tuneage
- "Retail Therapy EP" (2011) - four-track EP released by Boss Tuneage
