= The Only Good Punk... Is a Dead One =

The Only Good Punk...Is A Dead One

Studio album by Electro Hippies
- Released: 1988
- Recorded: 30 November and 1 December 1987
- Genre: Grindcore; crust punk; hardcore punk
- Length: 30:20
- Label: Peaceville
- Producer: Electro Hippies, Hammy

Electro Hippies chronology
Electro Hippies/Generic Split (1986)	The Only Good Punk...Is A Dead One (1988)	The Peel Session (1986)

Professional ratings
Review scores
Source	Rating
allmusic	3/5 stars

The Only Good Punk...Is A Dead One is the debut album proper by British crust punk band Electro Hippies. The original LP featured 20 songs, all but four of which last less than two minutes. The 2002 re-issue of the album (with the title shortened to The Only Good Punk) contains an additional 20 tracks (the listing can be found at the allmusic review); of those, six were taken from a compilation album and fourteen were from a live recording done in 1989.

== Track listing ==
- All Songs Written By Electro Hippies.

No.	Title	Length
1.	"Faith"	0:39
2.	"Acid Rain"	2:53
3.	"Run Ronald"	0:40
4.	"Scum"	1:05
5.	"B.P."	1:47
6.	"Unity"	1:59
7.	"Terror Eyes"	2:40
8.	"So Wicked"	0:46
9.	"Profit"	0:54
10.	"Freddy's Revenge"	1:47
11.	"Mistake"	0:43
12.	"Things Of Beauty"	4:05
13.	"Protest"	0:30
14.	"Gas Joe Pearce"	0:54
15.	"Lies"	1:55
16.	"Tortured Tears"	1:31
17.	"Turkeys"	0:56
18.	"D.I.Y."	1:01
19.	"Suck"	0:42
20.	"Deception"	2:53
Total length:		30:20

== Personnel ==
- Andy: guitars, vocals
- Dom: bass, vocals
- Simon: drums

== Production ==
- Produced By Electro Hippies & Hammy
- Engineered & Mixed By Disk Drive
