= No More (band) =

German band

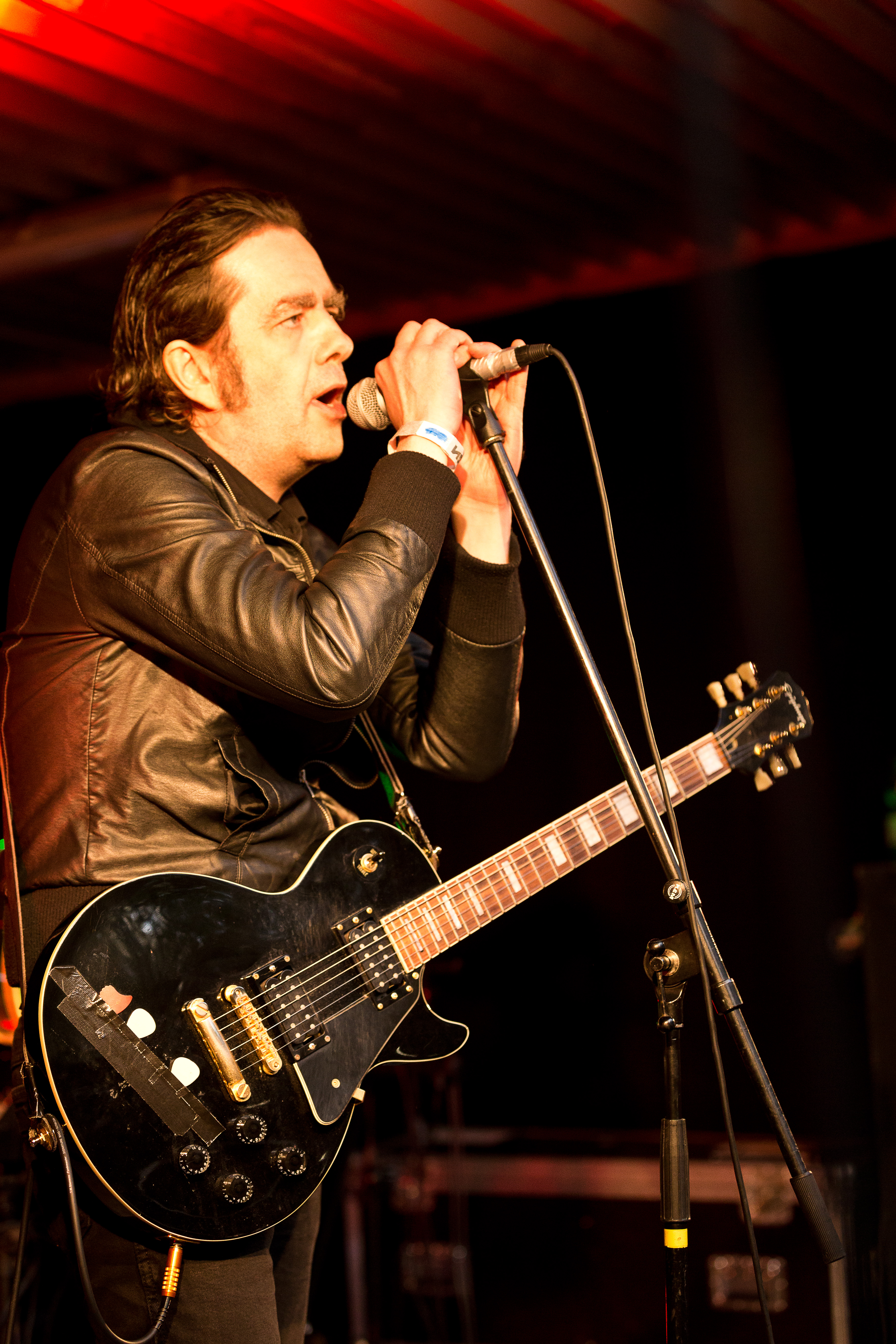
- Singer Andy A. Schwarz at the 10. Nocturnal Culture Night festival 2015

Background information
- Origin: Kiel, Germany
- Genres: Post-punk, minimal music, no wave
- Members: Andy A. Schwarz, Tina Sanudakura
- Past members: Christian Darc, Thomas Welz, Thorsten Hartung, Yvonne Pfeifer

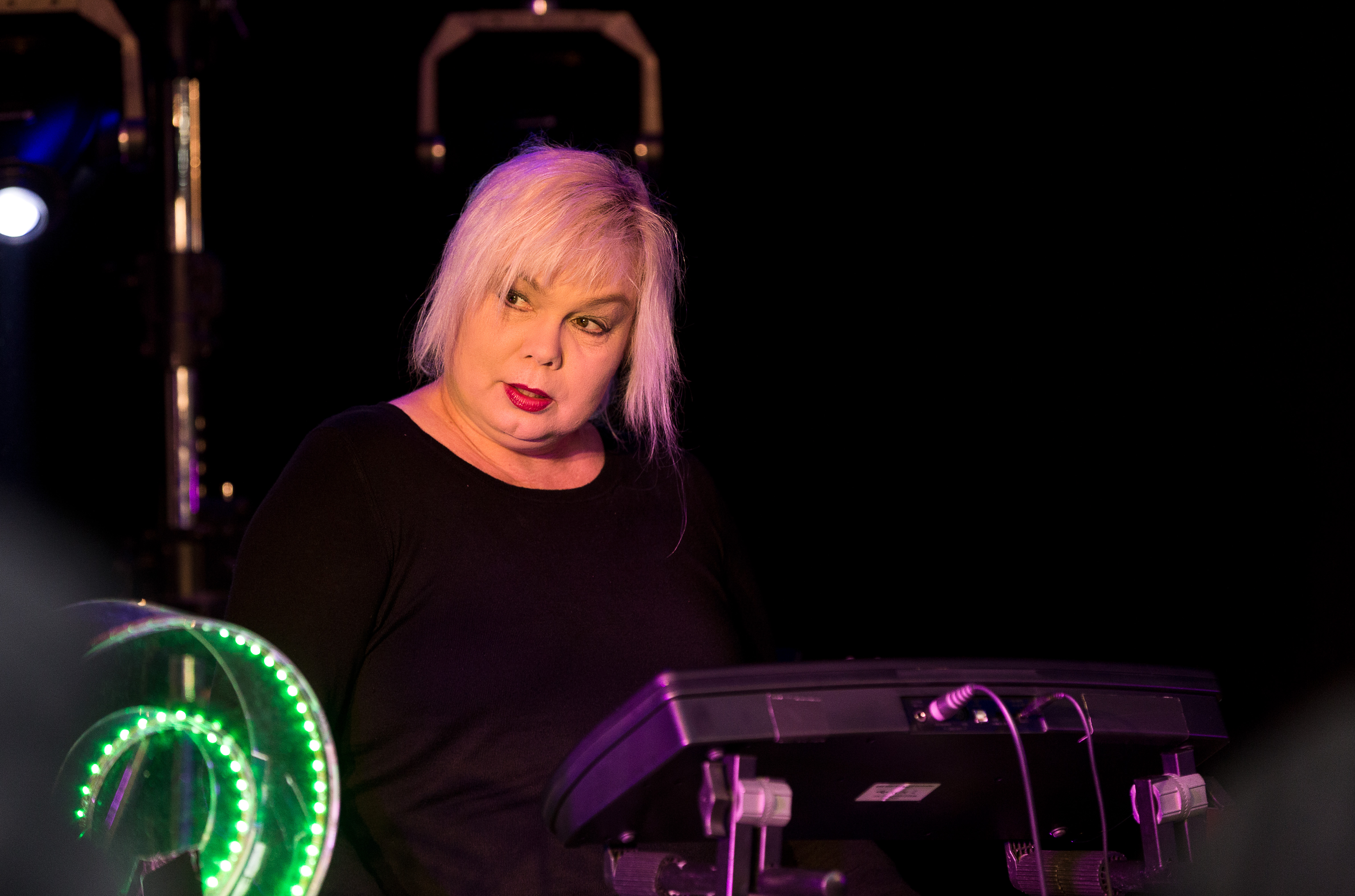
Tina Sanudakura at the 10. Nocturnal Culture Night festival 2015.

No More is a German band from Kiel founded in 1979. Their music is rooted in early post-punk/no wave.

== Biography ==
No More was founded by Andy A. Schwarz (vocals, guitar, bass), Tina Sanudakura (synthesizers), Christian Darc (drums, vocals) and Thomas Welz (bass, vocals) in Kiel, a seaside town in the northern part of Germany. The 7-inch EP "Too Late" was the first release in 1980 and was recorded in a small laundry-room with a 4-track TEAC (the EP was reviewed in the German SOUNDS-magazine as "strangely, archaic music, brute sound that seems to be recorded with a purposely damaged 4-track"). After the departure of Thomas Welz at the end of 1980, No More worked as a trio until the end of 1983.

The song "Suicide Commando" (released in 1981 and not to be confused with the Belgian band Suicide Commando, who named themselves after that song) is the band's biggest success. The New Musical Express described "Suicide Commando" as "suitable German electro fashion" but the song spread in the following years internationally regardless of genre and scene. In the 1990s the song entered the Techno- and Electroscene, when it was remixed by DJ Hell and Echopark (Moguai & Torsten Stenzel).

In 1982 No More released the mini-LP "A Rose Is A Rose" this time reviewed by the NME as "made by a trio of young Germans who appear to have fallen out of Lou Reed´s 'Berlin' album". After the release of "A Rose Is A Rose" No More decided to change direction. The new style was a mixture of darkwave and oriental elements.

In 1984 Thorsten Hartung (bass) joined the band. In the slipstream of the "Suicide Commando" success No More started to tour Germany and the Netherlands but soon refused to play the song. No More decided to go their separate ways at the end of 1986, shortly after finishing their album "Hysteria". Tina Sanudakura and Andy A. Schwarz formed the band Nijinsky Style.

In 2006 No More (condensed to the duo Tina Sanudakura and Andy A. Schwarz) released a new album called "Remake/Remodel". At the end of 2008 they started touring again and in January 2010 the single "Sunday Mitternacht / A Rose Is A Rose" was released. The album "Midnight People & Lo-Life Stars" was released in March 2010, followed by the 2012 album "Sisyphus".

In 2015 the band turned to a more Pop orientated sound with the release of the single "Stardust Youth" and the album "Silence & Revolt".

In 2026 No More released LP The End Of The World, which received a 3.5* review from Ox-fanzine.

== Discography ==
=== Albums and singles ===
- 1980: Too Late (7-inch Single, Too Late Records, Germany)
- 1981: Suicide Commando (7-inch Single, Too Late Records, Germany)
- 1982: A Rose Is A Rose (10-inch Mini-LP, Too Late Records, Germany)
- 1984: Suicide Commando (12-inch Single, Roof Records / Wishbone Records, Germany)
- 1984: Laughter In The Wings (12-inch Mini-LP, Wishbone Records, Germany)
- 1985: Do You Dream Of Angels In This Big City? (12-inch Single, Roof Records, Germany)
- 1986: Different Longings (12-inch EP, Roof Records, Germany)
- 1987: Hysteria (LP, Roof Records, Germany)
- 1990: 7 Years – A Compilation 1979–1986 (LP/CD, Roof Records, Germany)
- 2005: Dreams (LP, Vinyl On Demand, Germany)
- 2006: Remake/Remodel(2×CD, Roof Music, Germany)
- 2010: Sunday Mitternacht / A Rose Is A Rose (7-inch Single, Rent A Dog, Germany)
- 2010: Midnight People & Lo-Life Stars (CD, Rent A Dog, Germany)
- 2010: 7 Years – A Compilation 1979–1986 Re-Issue (CD & ltd. Boxset, Rustblade Records, Italy)
- 2010: Live At The Blue Shell (EP, digital only, Rent A Dog, Germany)
- 2012: Sisyphus (CD, Rent A Dog Records)
- 2012: All Is Well -Senza Macchia / The Grey (digital only, Rent A Dog Records)
- 2012: Dreams Deluxe - early recordings 1980-82 (2 CD, Vinyl On Demand)
- 2012: Hypnotized / Take Me To Yours (EP, digital only, Rent A Dog Records)
- 2013: The Return Of The German Angst (Mixtape, digital only, Rent A Dog Records, Germany)
- 2015: Suicide Commando (12-inch Single Re-Issue, Mannequin Records, Italy)
- 2015: Stardust Youth (nur digital, Rent A Dog Records, Germany)
- 2015: Silence & Revolt (CD, Rent A Dog Records, Germany)
- 2020: The End Of The World (EP, 12-inch Vinyl, limitiert, Rent A Dog Records)
- 2020: The End Of The World (CD, art edition, ltd)
- 2021: W.K.V.B.Z. - Sketches Of An Imaginary Soundtrack (CD, cassette, digital)

=== Singles ===
- 1980: Too Late (7-inch Single, Too Late Records)
- 1981: Suicide Commando (7-inch Single, Too Late Records)
- 1984: Suicide Commando (12-inch Single, Roof Records / Wishbone Records)
- 1985: Do You Dream of Angels in This Big City? (12-inch Single, Roof Records)
- 2010: Sunday Mitternacht / A Rose Is a Rose (7-inch Single, Rent A Dog Records)
- 2012: All Is Well - Senza Macchia / The Grey (nur digital, Rent A Dog Records)
- 2012: Hypnotized / Take Me to Yours (nur digital, Rent A Dog Records)
- 2015: Suicide Commando (12-inch Single Re-Issue, Mannequin Records, Italien)
- 2015: Stardust Youth (nur digital, Rent A Dog Records)
- 2018: Out Of The Window / The Great Masturbator (7-inch Single, Echoplay, Deutschland)
- 2018: NO MORE & Psyche Ghosts Of The Past (3xFile, AIFF, Single, Psyche Enterprises, Deutschland)
- 2019: NO MORE's 123456789 remixed by baze.djunkiii & Herr Brandt (7-inch, S/Sided, Ltd, col, [El Caballo Semental], Deutschland)
- 2020: Descending / a.e.s. (Single, nur digital)
- 2021: Into A Dream - vocal version (Single, digital)

=== Remixes ===
- 1991: Suicide Commando – The Mc Goniggle Dance Mix (CD-EP, Rude Records)
- 1998: DJ Hell – Suicide Commando (CD/12" Single/LP, V2 Records)
- 1998: Echopark presents No More – Suicide Commando (12-inch Single/CD, Eastwest Records / Fuel)
- 2005: Vitalic – Suicide Commando (VA – Colette No. 7, 2×CD, Colette France)
- 2010: Various Artists – Sunday Mitternacht Remixes (CD, Rent A Dog Records)

=== Compilations ===
- 1981: The Wonderful World Of Glass Vol. One (LP, Glass Records UK)
- 1989: About New Beat (Past & Present) (2x12" EP, MG Records Belgium)
- 1991: New Wave Club Classix 2 (CD, Antler Subway Records Belgium)
- 1994: Godfathers Of German Gothic 1980–1985 (CD, Sub Terranean Germany)
- 1998: EBM Club Classics Vol. 1 (2×CD, SPV Germany)
- 2003: Aktion Mekanik (2×LP/2×CD, Music Man Records Belgium)
- 2003: New Deutsch (2×LP/2×CD, Gigolo Records Germany)
- 2005: Colette No 7- (2 CDs, Colette, France)
- 2008: 100% New Wave (5 CDs, Belgium)
- 2008: Saturator (CD, Saturator, Poland)
- 2009: M’era Luna Festival Compilation (2 CDs, Germany)
- 2009: Sinner's Day 09 – New Wave Club Class X Box (3 CDs, Belgium)
- 2009: 12.72 Mix#3 by Lil!Mike (USB-Stick, 12.72, France)
- 2010: Bustin‘ Out (CD, Future Noise Music (Year Zero), UK)
- 2010: Lima El3ctronica Vol 1 (CD, Tacuara Records, Peru)
- 2011: German Punk & Wave 78–84 Vol.1 (Vinyl Box, Vinyl On Demand, Germany)
- 2011: Sparkles In The Dark Vol. I (nur digital, Dark Italia, Italien)
- 2014: Pagan Lovesongs (Antitainment Compilation Vol. III, Deutschland)
- 2014: A Rose Is A Rose (LP, Dark Entries, USA)
- 2016: Touchlight Buddhas (Vinyl-LP, digitales Album, kuratiert von DIRK IVENS, Belgien)
- 2019: Love, Noise & Paranoia - 40 Years Anniversary Compilation (Vinyl-LP mit 11 Stücken; CD mit 20 Stücken; Vinyl mit Download Code für alle Songs zzgl. 3 Bonus-Tracks, rent a dog, Deutschland)
