= Scum (Napalm Death album) =

Studio album by Napalm Death
- Released: 1 July 1987
- Recorded: August 1986 (side A); May 1987 (side B)
- Studio: Rich Bitch (Birmingham)
- Genres: Grindcore; crust punk
- Length: 33:04
- Label: Earache
- Producers: Napalm Death; Unseen Terror; Head of David; Dig

Napalm Death chronology
Scum (1987)	From Enslavement to Obliteration (1988)

Singles from Scum
- 1. "You Suffer" Released: 1989

Scum is the debut studio album by English grindcore band Napalm Death, released on 1 July 1987 by Earache Records. The two sides of Scum were recorded by two different lineups in sessions separated by about a year; the only musician in both incarnations was drummer Mick Harris.

Scum sold over 10,000 copies in its first year of release, reaching number four on the UK Indie chart. Since then, it has become known as a formative release in the grindcore genre. In 2005, Scum was voted the 50th best British album of all time by Kerrang! readers. In 2009, it was ranked number five in Terrorizer's list of essential European grindcore albums. It is also listed in Robert Dimery's book 1001 Albums You Must Hear Before You Die. Loudwire put it in the list of the best 10 metal albums of 1987.

== Background ==
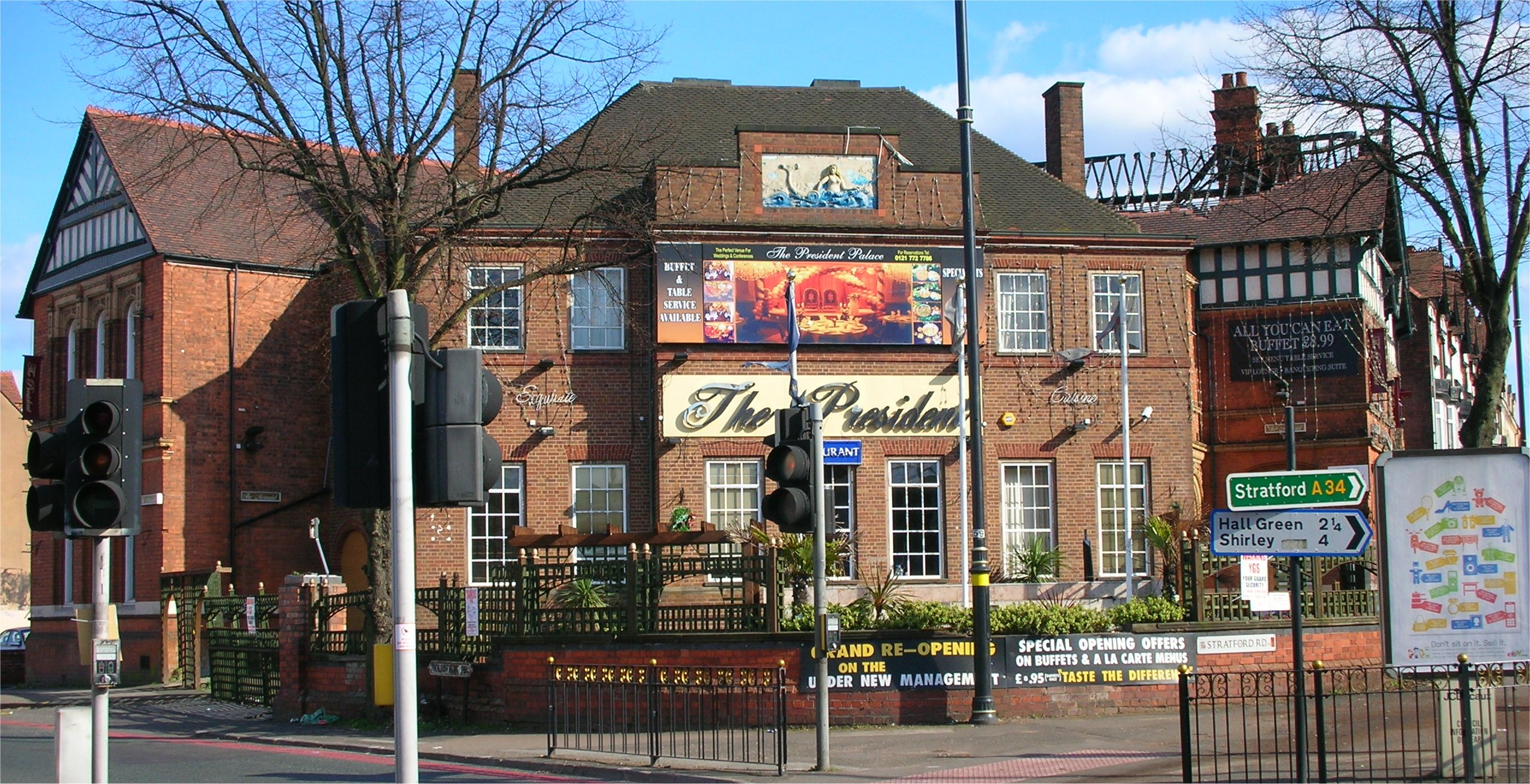
The Mermaid in Birmingham, where Napalm Death frequently supported touring punk bands in the early and mid 1980s.

Napalm Death formed in 1981. After various personnel changes, demo recordings, and a period of dormancy, they had returned to activity in 1985 with a lineup of Nicholas Bullen (vocals, bass), Justin Broadrick (guitar), and Miles Ratledge (drums). Around this time, Daz Russell, promoter of the club The Mermaid in Birmingham, had essentially made Napalm Death the punk "house band" of his club. Due to the local popularity of the band, this arrangement secured him the visitor numbers sufficient to generate enough revenue to pay the foreign bands playing at the club. Napalm Death therefore supported all the hardcore punk bands that Russell booked, including Anti Cimex, Sacrilege, Heresy, Concrete Sox, and The Varukers. Bassist Peter Shaw also briefly played with the band while Bullen sang exclusively. After recording their demo Hatred Surge, Shaw and founding drummer Ratledge departed, and the latter was replaced by Mick Harris in November 1985. Harris aspired to play faster than any other drummer, citing U.S. hardcore bands Siege and Deep Wound as influences. The first live appearances with this lineup took place in January 1986 with Amebix and Instigators, and the new lineup had allowed the band to become more musically adept. In March 1986, the group entered Flick Studios and recorded the demo From Enslavement to Obliteration, combining their initial anarcho-punk influences with riffs akin to those of Celtic Frost and extremely fast drumming.

== Recording and production ==
Napalm Death intended to record another demo in 1986, as no record label had yet shown interest in the band. Russell offered to release either a single or split for the band on his newly formed independent label. The band thus entered the Rich Bitch studio in Birmingham to record a set of songs. The recordings took place over two days, with sessions happening at night due to the studio charging a lower hourly recording rate during this time. Around 20 friends of the band were present for the sessions. These included the members of the bands Head of David and Unseen Terror, who are listed on the record as producers, as well as Damian Thompson of Sacrilege, from whom Broadrick had borrowed an effects pedal.

The songs came from different phases of the band's development. Some material was based on ideas from Justin Broadrick dating to 1983, while others derived from material written by Broadrick and Ratledge for the Hatred Surge demo. The songs "The Kill", "You Suffer", and "Death by Manipulation" were included on Scum, but the versions of the songs recorded during this session were faster than the originals. Russell paid the initial studio costs, but Napalm Death decided not to give him the master tapes because he had never paid them for their appearances at The Mermaid.

After the recording sessions, there was tension in the band. Bullen attributed this to the fact that every band member wanted to take over the leading role. In September 1986, Jim Whiteley joined as bass player while Bullen switched to singing exclusively. This coincided with Bullen's loss of interest in Napalm Death and music more generally. After a concert in Leeds with Sacrilege, Broadrick left the band to play drums in Head of David, which was at the time more successful than Napalm Death after having released an album for Blast First, the label of Sonic Youth. Broadrick was initially replaced by Frank Healy, and later by the 16-year-old Bill Steer. Soon thereafter, Bullen left Napalm Death to pursue his studies of English literature and philosophy at the university. Lee Dorrian joined as the band's new singer. The new lineup's sound reflected an increasing interest in heavy metal while remaining rooted in anarcho-punk.

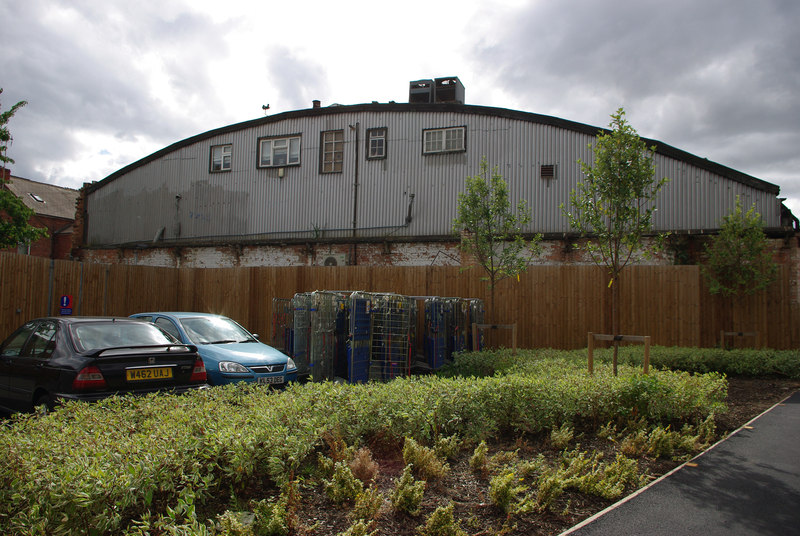
The rear of Rich Bitch Studios, where Napalm Death recorded both sides of Scum in studio sessions, one each in 1986 and 1987, featuring two different lineups.

In late 1986, the band came into contact with Digby Pearson, who had just founded Earache Records. Pearson had learned of the band after receiving the recordings from Broadrick. In March 1987, Napalm Death signed a contract with Pearson, who bought the master tape from the 1986 recordings and booked the Rich Bitch Studio to record further material. Harris had written 16 songs with Steer in his parents' house in Liverpool. Two songs were written by Steer, and Whiteley was involved in some of the arrangements. Harris had written tracks on a guitar despite not being able to play the instrument. He did this simply by tuning the A and E strings down and removing the others, recording the guitar parts on a tape recorder. The lyrics were written by Whiteley, while Dorrian added some material on the night before the recordings. The band had only one three-hour rehearsal before entering the studio in May 1987.

The recordings took place under the direction of sound engineer Mike Ivory. As was the case for the recording sessions yielding the A-side, the B-side recording sessions were held overnight for reasons related to cost. The recordings were difficult, especially for Dorrian, who was in a recording studio for the first time. Harris had to signal to Dorrian to indicate the moments at which he was to begin singing. The band was not satisfied with the initial mix, particularly due to the drum sound. Pearson organized a final studio mixing session, which took place from 4 to 8 o'clock in the morning, to fix the initial mixes.

== Release and promotion ==
Pearson wanted to release Napalm Death's debut not as a mini-album and not as a split, but instead as a complete album. He did not believe, however, that the current lineup, which had not been active for long, could write enough songs for an album in a reasonable time. He therefore decided to use the previously unused recordings from August 1986 as an A-side for an album. There was little reason to expect the record to achieve commercial success, and for this reason, the budget for the record's production was very low. Pearson spent nearly all of his savings for the recording, production, and promotion of the album. It was his label's third release, and the album's failure would have potentially spelled bankruptcy. In June 1987, the album was released in a pressing of 2000 copies.

Earache Records secured a contract with Revolver Records and thus was able to ensure the nationwide distribution of its releases, so that the first edition of the album sold out within a few weeks. Simultaneously, Napalm Death embarked upon the first tour in their history along with Ripcord. The most decisive cause of the commercial success of Scum came when radio host John Peel played songs from the album on his radio show BBC Radio 1 and subsequently invited the band to perform a Peel Session. On 13 September 1987, Napalm Death recorded twelve tracks with a total playing time of 5 minutes and 40 seconds, which were first broadcast on 22 September 1987. The broadcast gave the album national attention, and Earache Records thus pressed another edition. This sold well, leading Napalm Death to procure the number 8 spot on the UK Indie Charts. Within a few weeks of the first Peel Session, about 10,000 units of the album had been sold.

The first pressing of the CD (1988) included 54 tracks, adding the From Enslavement to Obliteration album and four bonuses. In 1994, the first two albums were re-released separately. A remastered version was released on 27 January 2012.

== Music and lyrics ==
The album's two sides are drastically different from each other in style, and the two taken together serve to bridge stylistic elements of heavy metal and punk rock. While the songs on the A-side are influenced heavily by hardcore punk and anarcho-punk, the vocals and lower-tuned electric guitars on the B-side anticipate subsequent developments in extreme metal. Joe DiVita of Loudwire assessed that the two sides are "slapped together with surprising continuity despite the differing production values." Additionally, the album contains elements of jazz and noise music. The album has been described as "rock & roll kicks taken to an almost ridiculous extreme." The album features extremely brief compositions and exceedingly fast tempos, with some songs using quadruple-time beats. The album makes use of "raspy," "deep, grunted vocals", or death growls. Lyrical themes on the album include left-wing politics, and the songs have been described as "leftist diatribes about capitalism, the environment, and Britain's ruling elite."

Cillian Breathnach of Guitar.com said: "Scum is anything but nihilist, despite the violent, arresting imagery. The main question of the record is: 'isn’t human life worth something, something more than just profit?'"

According to AllMusic, the album's songs are structured around "hyperconcentrated Black Sabbath-via-Motörhead-and-Metallica approaches as starting points," eventually exploding into blast beats and noise when "everyone concentrates on nothing but speed itself."

Guitar.com said of the album's production: "The whole production aesthetic is so rough that it’s hard to tell what distortion is coming from amps and pedals, and what’s coming from the mixing desk. But despite the fact that everything is in the red, Scum is a pretty impressive feat of engineering: throughout all the sonic chaos, there’s a relative amount of instrument separation, and guitar and bass transients poke through the constant blastbeats and cymbals. Yes, it’s not exactly something to test an audiophile set of headphones with, but that’s clearly not the band’s intention."

== Artwork ==
The cover artwork was created by Jeff Walker. According to Manish Agarwal of Time Out, "the sleeve depicts grotesque businessmen towering over an African family, underscored by a carpet of skulls peppered with the logos of McDonalds, Nestle, BP, and the like." Walker said of the companies on the cover: "Those companies were involved in dodgy dealings in the Eighties. Nestlé was selling powdered baby milk to African countries, telling mothers it was healthier than breast-feeding. Coca-Cola had some dodgy investments in South Africa [which was then under apartheid rule], and McDonald's were up to the usual—dodgy labor practices, union-busting, plus whatever shit they were shoving in the food."

Walker recalled the creative process: "Mick gave me a brief on what he wanted—kind of a hierarchal thing with skulls at the bottom, starving kids, corporate logos, and businessmen as overlords. But I tried to make it a bit more metal, I guess, by ripping off Celtic Frost. I ripped off the skulls from a Siege flyer and the Reagan Youth EP. I did a sketch in pencil and did the shading by stippling, which is just making a load of really fine ink dots and then erasing the original pencil marks. It took fucking ages to do. I actually didn't think I was ever gonna get it finished. Back then, things like artwork and recording were labors of love. Nowadays, everything's a piece of piss."

The album covers came in varied colours: orange, gold, green, blue, and yellow.

== Reception and legacy ==
Professional ratings
Review scores
Source	Rating
AllMusic	5/5 stars
The Encyclopedia of Popular Music	3/5 stars
Kerrang!	(1987) (2011)
The Metal Forge	10/10
Metal Forces	9.1/10
Pitchfork	8.4/10
Spin Alternative Record Guide	8/10

The album stands as a landmark achievement. Natalie J. Purcell described the album a formative influence on the European grindcore, while Ian Christe called Scum the conclusion of a ten-year competition for the fastest and hardest sound, marking the point from which neither speed nor intensity could increase. The album is regarded as the "central release of grindcore" both musically and lyrically, marking "the height of the discourse of extremization" within the British punk scene. Napalm Death remained active in the years that followed, but by the 1991 departure of Mick Harris, all members that had played on either side of Scum had been replaced by new members.

AllMusic said the album takes "the 'loud hard fast' rule to a logical extreme that the band's followers could only try to equal, but never better." In 2007, Brandon Stosuy of Pitchfork wrote: "What's strangest about close listening to something you thought you knew by heart is how unfamiliar and un-extreme Scum sounds in light of the music it helped birth. Sure, it's kind of obvious, and that's just how it goes with these sorts of things, but kids who've never heard Napalm Death's salad days, and who've cut their teeth on Cephalic Carnage, Nile, Behemoth, or even Dillinger Escape Plan might find it, gulp, sorta tame. Dillinger Escape Plan? Right, time's a motherfucker."

In 2008, Kory Grow of Decibel wrote: "Without Napalm Death’s Scum, you probably wouldn’t be holding this magazine. This album—essentially a split LP between two almost completely different lineups—defined grindcore with its growled vocals, whirring, hardcore-influenced riffs and faster-than-a-locomotive blast beats. Its fusion of anarcho-punk and death metal would inspire countless bands, and every musician who played on it would go on to do something extraordinary, musically." In 2017, J.R. Moores of Vice wrote: "Honestly, if you’re a musician who plays or a fan who dabbles in any of the many metal subgenres and you haven’t already familiarized yourself with Scum then frankly you haven’t completed your homework. Yet Scum‘s impact stretches far wider than grindcore, metal or even rock-based genres."

In 2021, Greg Pratt of Decibel wrote: "Contextually speaking, and looking at the historical importance of this album, it’s untouchable. It’s by no means Napalm Death’s best album, but it’s Scum: it’s just undeniable. Released in 1987, the album is immensely important in the history of extreme music. But beyond being important, it’s just awesome, every song incredibly hungry and wildly energetic, and, all these years later, those feelings still ooze out of every second of this record. [...] This record created shock waves still felt—and used for inspiration—by grind bands the world over to this day." In 2023, Stephen Hill of Metal Hammer wrote: "Although it’s one of extreme music’s most important releases, Napalm have outdone the music on Scum many, many times since it crawled out of the underground all those years ago. Still, it’s an essential artefact."

== Track listing ==
All tracks on side one are written by Justin Broadrick, Nicholas Bullen and Mick Harris. All tracks on side two are written by Mick Harris and Jim Whitely.

Side one
No.	Title	Length
1.	"Multinational Corporations"	1:06
2.	"Instinct of Survival"	2:26
3.	"The Kill"	0:23
4.	"Scum"	2:38
5.	"Caught... in a Dream"	1:47
6.	"Polluted Minds"	0:58
7.	"Sacrificed"	1:06
8.	"Siege of Power"	3:59
9.	"Control"	1:23
10.	"Born on Your Knees"	1:48
11.	"Human Garbage"	1:32
12.	"You Suffer"	0:01

Side two
No.	Title	Length
13.	"Life?"	0:43
14.	"Prison Without Walls"	0:38
15.	"Point of No Return"	0:35
16.	"Negative Approach"	0:32
17.	"Success?"	1:09
18.	"Deceiver"	0:29
19.	"C.S."	1:14
20.	"Parasites"	0:23
21.	"Pseudo Youth"	0:42
22.	"Divine Death"	1:21
23.	"As the Machine Rolls On"	0:42
24.	"Common Enemy"	0:16
25.	"Moral Crusade"	1:32
26.	"Stigmatized"	1:03
27.	"M.A.D."	1:34
28.	"Dragnet"	1:01

== Personnel ==
=== Side A (tracks 1–12) ===
- Nicholas 'Nik Napalm' Bullen – bass, vocals, lyrics
- Justin Broadrick – guitars, vocals ("Polluted Minds")
- Mick Harris – drums

=== Side B (tracks 13–28) ===
- Lee Dorrian – vocals
- Jim Whitely – bass, lyrics
- Bill Steer – guitars
- Mick Harris – drums, vocals

=== Additional personnel ===
- Napalm Death – production
- Unseen Terror – production
- Head of David – production (side one)
- Dig – production (side two), layout
- Mick Ivory – engineering
- Jeff Walker – cover artwork
- Nick Royles – photography

== Charts ==
Chart (1987)	Peak position
UK Indie Chart	4
