= Anamnesis (rhetoric) =

Anamnesis is a rhetorical and literary device derived from the Greek word "ἀνάμνησις," meaning "remembrance" or "recollection." It involves the act of recalling or invoking memories or past experiences. This technique is used to create a connection with the audience by drawing on shared memories or personal experiences. A more precise function of anamnesis involves the recall or reference to a previous author via memory.

== Notable examples ==
When I, good friends, was called to the bar,
I'd an appetite fresh and hearty,
But I was, as many young barristers are,
An impecunious party...
In Westminster Hall I danced a dance
Like a semi-despondent fury;
For I thought I should never hit on a chance
Of addressing a British Jury. - (Gilbert and Sullivan, Trial by Jury)

== See also ==
- Glossary of rhetorical terms
- Memory
