= Ruin (American band) =

American thrash metal band

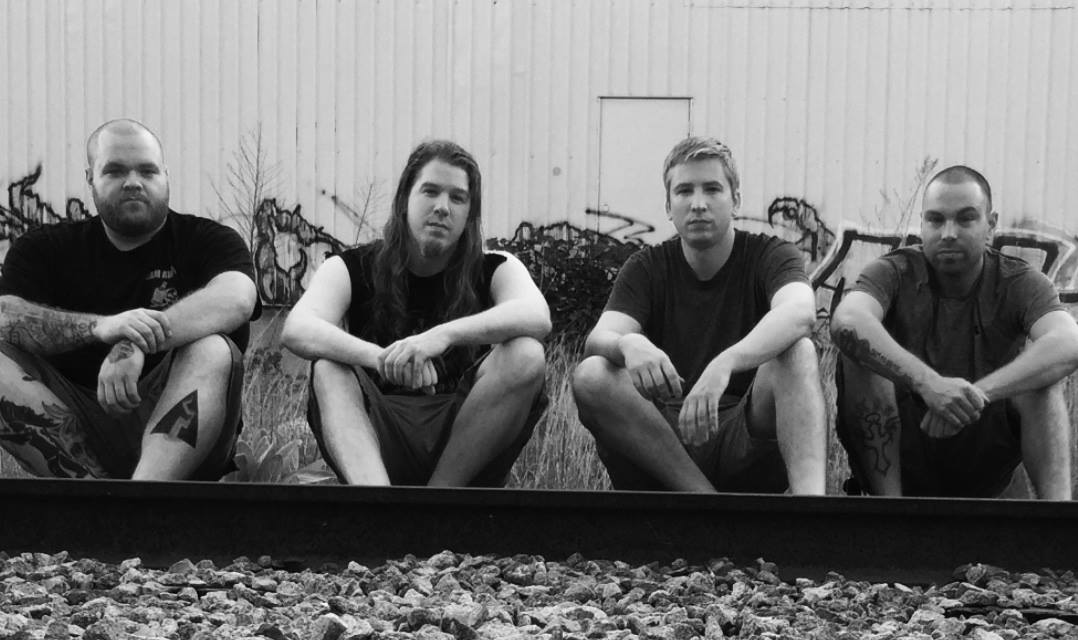
- Left to right: Todd Bidwell, Richard Carey, Craig Carey, Kevin Whitman

Background information
- Origin: Portland, Maine, U.S.
- Genres: Thrash metal, groove metal
- Years active: 2005–present
- Labels: RUIN Records
- Members: Richard Carey; Lee LeVasseur; Kevin Whitman; Todd Bidwell
- Past members: Ken Vought; Craig Carey
- Website: ruinband.net

Ruin (often stylized as RUIN) is an American thrash metal band from Portland, Maine, formed in 2005. Ruin's latest album Rite of Passage debuted in October 2014.

== Members ==
=== Current ===
- Richard Carey – guitar and vocals
- Craig Carey – drums
- Kevin Whitman – guitar
- Todd Biddwell – bass

=== Former ===
- Ken Vought – former guitarist (2005–2012)

== Discography ==
- Hands of Enmity (2007)
- Human Moral Deception (2009)
- Rite of Passage (2014)
