= From Enslavement to Obliteration =

Album by Napalm Death

Studio album by Napalm Death
- Released: 17 September 1988
- Recorded: July 1988
- Studios: Birdsong, Worcester, England
- Genre: Grindcore
- Length: 29:20
- Label: Earache
- Producers: Napalm Death and Dig

Napalm Death chronology
Scum (1987)	From Enslavement to Obliteration (1988)	Mentally Murdered (1989)

From Enslavement to Obliteration is the second studio album by English grindcore band Napalm Death, released in 1988. It is the final studio album with vocalist Lee Dorrian and guitarist Bill Steer, and the first to feature bassist Shane Embury, the band's longest-tenured member to date. A remastered version was released on 2 April 2012. Loudwire put it on the list of the 10 best metal albums of 1988. It is one of the first albums to mix deep guttural growl vocals and high screeches with blast beats.

== Background ==
The album's lyrical themes cover a variety of social and political topics, including misogyny/sexism ("It's a M.A.N.S World" and "Inconceivable?"), animal rights ("Display to Me…"), racism ("Unchallenged Hate"), materialism ("Private Death"), and anti-capitalism ("From Enslavement to Obliteration" and "Make Way!"). The album calls for social change, as seen in the song "Uncertainty Blurs the Vision," quoting Rudimentary Peni at the song's conclusion.

Shane Embury retrospectively commented on the band's progression up until From Enslavement to Obliteration in Kerrang! magazine:

It was a good experience but it was a brief one. Back in those days albums were recorded very quickly – we recorded the album in about six days and I think it cost about £800. In the early days in the very beginning before I joined, it was more of a crust punk band really but it was a natural progression, I think, to get faster and faster. Scum created a buzz and by the time we did FETO, we just wanted to push it as far as we could and as fast as possible. We weren't really consciously trying to break any rules but we weren't paying any attention to them either. If we wanted to do a song that was going to be 20 seconds long then we'd do it – we didn't think there was any reason not to. The vocals for us went hand-in-hand with the distorted bass guitar, distorted guitars and hyper-fast drumming.

== Reception ==
Professional ratings
Review scores
Source	Rating
AllMusic	4.5/5 stars
Classic Rock	8/10
The Encyclopedia of Popular Music	3/5 stars
Spin Alternative Record Guide	8/10

In 2009 From Enslavement to Obliteration was ranked number 1 in Terrorizer's list of essential European grindcore albums. Writer Jonathan Horsley described it as marking "the genre's perilous rite of passage through Britain's post-industrial urban landscape." Classic Rock reviewer remarked how the stable line-up brought "new maturity and coherence" and reminded that "for an all-too-brief moment in time, this album could lay claim to being the most extreme collection of songs ever recorded".

In 2017, Rolling Stone ranked From Enslavement to Obliteration as 59th on their list of "The 100 Greatest Metal Albums of All Time".

== Track listing ==
Writing credits taken from ASCAP.

Side one
No.	Title	Writer(s)	Length
1.	"Evolved as One"	Dorrian, Embury	3:13
2.	"It's a M.A.N.S World!"	Dorrian, Harris	0:54
3.	"Lucid Fairytale"	Dorrian, Embury	1:02
4.	"Private Death"	Embury, Harris	0:35
5.	"Impressions"	Dorrian, Embury	0:35
6.	"Unchallenged Hate"	Dorrian, Embury	2:07
7.	"Uncertainty Blurs the Vision"	Dorrian, Harris	0:40
8.	"Cock-Rock Alienation"	Dorrian, Harris	1:20
9.	"Retreat to Nowhere"	Dorrian, Harris	0:30
10.	"Think for a Minute"	Dorrian, Harris	1:42
11.	"Display to Me…"	Dorrian, Harris	2:43

Side two
No.	Title	Writer(s)	Length
12.	"From Enslavement to Obliteration"	Dorrian, Harris	1:35
13.	"Blind to the Truth"	Dorrian, Embury	0:21
14.	"Social Sterility"	Dorrian, Harris	1:03
15.	"Emotional Suffocation"	Dorrian, Harris	1:06
16.	"Practice What You Preach"	Dorrian, Embury	1:23
17.	"Inconceivable?"	Dorrian, Harris	1:06
18.	"Worlds Apart"	Dorrian, Embury	1:24
19.	"Obstinate Direction"	Dorrian, Embury, Harris, Steer	1:01
20.	"Mentally Murdered"	Embury, Harris	2:13
21.	"Sometimes"	Dorrian, Embury	1:06
22.	"Make Way!"	Dorrian, Harris	1:36

=== The Curse ===
The Curse

EP by Napalm Death
- Released: September 1988
- Genre: Grindcore
- Length: 5:04
- Label: Earache (7MOSH 8)

The Curse is a free 7-inch extended play included in the initial copies of the From Enslavement to Obliteration LP, which was released through Earache Records in September 1988.

The cover uses the famous photograph of Phan Thi Kim Phuc fleeing a napalm attack, taken by Nick Ut.

==== Track listing ====
Side one
No.	Title	Writer(s)	Length
1.	"The Curse"	Dorrian, Harris	3:17

Side two
No.	Title	Writer(s)	Length
1.	"Musclehead"	Dorrian, Embury	0:51
2.	"Your Achievement?"	Dorrian, Embury	0:06
3.	"Dead"	Dorrian, Embury	0:04
4.	"Morbid Deceiver"	Dorrian, Harris	0:45

- The song "Morbid Deceiver" is a re-recording of the song "Deceiver", originally on the album Scum.

== Personnel ==
Napalm Death

- Lee Dorrian – lead vocals, lyrics
- Bill Steer – guitars
- Shane Embury – bass, lyrics for "Private Death," "Unchallenged Hate," and "Blind to the Truth"
- Mick Harris – drums, backing vocals

Production

- Steve Bird – engineering
- Mark Sikora – cover art
- Mike Marsh – mastering

== Trivia ==
Some LPs had a sticker with the following line printed on it: "We wanted to be the biggest rock band in the world and you don't do that sounding like Napalm Death" Joe Elliot (Def Leppard)

Grindcore band Sore Throat included a track called "From Off License to Obliteration" on their 101-track 1988 album Disgrace to the Corpse of Sid, also released on Earache Records.

== Charts ==
Chart (1988)	Peak position
UK Indie Chart	1
