= Nicholas Bullen =

British musician

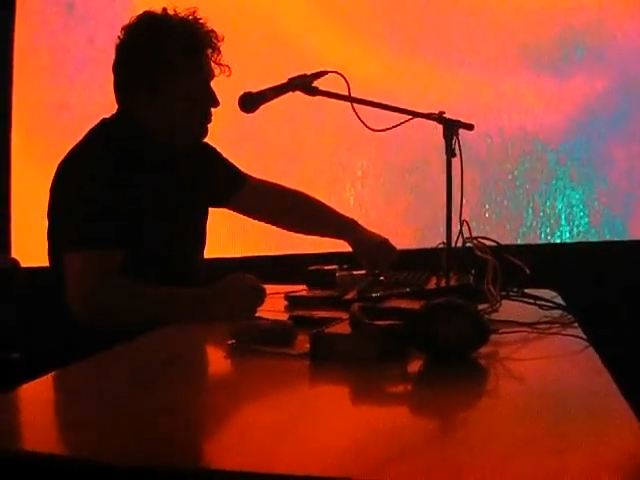
- Bullen in 2011

Background information
- Also known as: Nik Napalm
- Born: 1968 (age 57–58); Coventry, England
- Origin: Birmingham, England
- Genres: Punk rock, industrial, electronica, grindcore, sludge metal
- Occupation: Musician
- Instruments: Vocals, bass, guitar, synthesizers
- Years active: 1981–present
- Label: Monium
- Formerly of: Napalm Death (1981–87), Scorn (1991–95), Final (1983)

Nicholas Bullen (sometimes called Nik Napalm; born 1968) is an English musician and a founding member of the grindcore band Napalm Death.

== Biography ==
Bullen is one of the founding members – with Miles "Rat" Ratledge – of Napalm Death, the band credited with creating the Grindcore genre. The duo had collaborated on fanzines and played together in a number of 'bedroom' bands from 1980 onwards and formed the first line-up of Napalm Death in May 1981 (when Bullen and Ratledge were 13 and 14 years old respectively).

Bullen was initially the vocalist in the group, but later began to play bass and vocals after Justin Broadrick (Godflesh and Jesu) was invited to join the group on guitar in 1985. Bullen had previously been a collaborator with Broadrick in the power electronics project Final in 1983 and 1984.

Bullen left Napalm Death in December 1986 (after recording the A-side of the band's debut album Scum which is credited with being the release which initiated the 'Grindcore' genre) due to an increasing dissatisfaction with the direction of the group and a desire to pursue his studies at university (where he studied English literature and philosophy).

Bullen was invited to join Mick Harris (a fellow ex-member of Napalm Death) in Scorn in 1991: a more experimental project that moved away from the members previous work to explore dark breakbeat-driven rhythmic mantras informed by avant-garde modern composition, the reflective spaces of Dub and dark drone-based ambience. The core duo released 3 albums on the Earache label, along with a number of 12" singles featuring radically deconstructed remixes of album material and appearances on compilation albums (including the Isolationism and Macro Dub Infection compilations of the Virgin Ambient series). The group also released an album of remixes featuring artists such as Bill Laswell, Scanner, Coil and Autechre, and recorded 2 sessions for the John Peel radio show. The group featured a revolving roster of temporary members including Paul Neville (Godflesh) and James Plotkin (OLD, Khanate) in an ancillary role as guitarist. Bullen left the group in March 1995.

Bullen continued to be involved in other projects during his tenure in Scorn: he worked with the avant-garde techno group Germ, the experimental soundscape project Umbilical Limbo and released material under his own name including an album called Bass Terror with bassist and avant-garde producer Bill Laswell.

Bullen remained silent musically for the best part of a decade (during which time he gained another university degree in Computer Science) before returning to live performing in 2003 with the experimental electronic group Black Galaxy. Black Galaxy use a range of instrumentation (including laptop, tone generators, circuit bent instruments, tabletop guitar, preparations, and amplified objects) to blend rhythmic pulses with deep bass tones and abstracted sound. They also create satellite work related to non-rhythmic sound fields, live improvised film soundtracking, and regular collaboration with electro-acoustic musicians kREEPA. The group have played at a number of festivals (including Sonar (Barcelona), Supersonic festival and the Sonic Arts Network Expo). He also participates in a number of other collaborative projects which are predominantly focused on live performance and improvisation (including the Photon Hex ensemble and electro-acoustic improvising trio Migrant), and performs solo (as Alienist and under his own name).

To extend this work, Bullen began the Monium imprint in 2006 with the intention of bringing together a loose collective of artists interested in the exploration of (analogue / digital, improvisation / composition, performance / recording) in sound, film and text.

Bullen's work in the field of sound art has included sound installations, sound design for radio-based art, writing on the use of the voice in music and art, a tour of cinemas producing improvised sound responses to key pieces of 'experimental' cinema, lectures, and collaborations with artists at a variety of venues (including Tate Britain, Art Basel, Hayward Gallery, Schirn Kunsthalle, ICA (Institute of Contemporary Arts), Arnolfini Gallery, Ikon Eastside, City Projects and New Art Gallery Walsall). He also continues to develop an ongoing interest in Super 8mm film-making (with a particular focus on abstraction and hand-painted work).

In 2019, Bullen released No You, with his band Rainbow Grave. The band includes John Pickering (formerly of Cain, Doom, Police Bastards, among others) on guitars, Nathan Warner (Bee Stung Lips) on bass, and James Commander on drums. This band is influenced by punk rock and sludge metal.

He is based in Birmingham.

== Discography ==
Napalm Death

- 1987 - Scum (Earache Records)

Scorn

- 1992 - Vae Solis (Earache Records)
- 1993 - Colossus (Earache Records)
- 1994 - Evanescence (Earache Records)

Nicholas Bullen & Bill Laswell

- 1995 - Subsonic 2: Bass Terror (Sub Rosa)

Rainbow Grave

- 2019 - No You (God Unknown Records)
