= Mick Harris =

British drummer

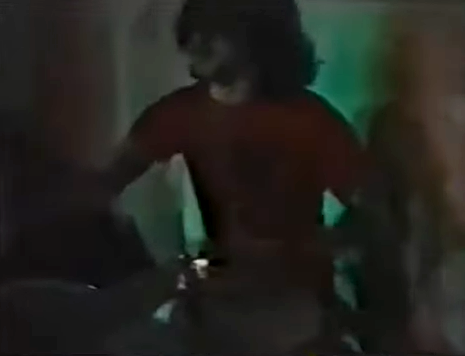
- Harris with Extreme Noise Terror in 1988

Background information
- Also known as: M.J. Harris
- Born: Michael John Harris; 4 October 1967 (age 58); Birmingham, England
- Genres: Hardcore punk, grindcore, deathgrind, extreme metal, electronica, experimental, industrial, free jazz, illbient, dub
- Occupation: Musician
- Instruments: Drums, drum machines, synthesizers, vocals
- Years active: 1985–2011, 2017–present
- Member of: Lull, Painkiller
- Formerly of: Napalm Death, Doom, Extreme Noise Terror, Defecation, Scorn

Michael John Harris (born 4 October 1967) is an English musician from Birmingham. He was the drummer for Napalm Death between 1985 and 1991, and is credited for coining the term "grindcore". Harris is widely regarded as one of the founders of the blast beat for his incredibly fast "Chaos U.K" beat he uses all across the three Napalm Death albums he plays on. After Napalm Death, Harris joined Painkiller with John Zorn and Bill Laswell. Since the mid-1990s, Harris has worked primarily in electronic, ambient and dub music, his main projects being Scorn and Lull. He has also collaborated with musicians including James Plotkin and Extreme Noise Terror. According to AllMusic, Harris's "genre-spanning activities have done much to jar the minds, expectations, and record collections of audiences previously kept aggressively opposed."

== Early life ==
Michael John Harris was born in Birmingham, England. He grew up listening to the radio shows of John Peel and would later record Peel Sessions with both Napalm Death and Scorn. Harris was influenced by listening to bands such as Coil and Skinny Puppy. He started playing drums in 1984 at the age of 16, after a friend in a psychobilly band called Martian Brain Squeeze asked him to play. Harris then joined a punk band called Anorexia with Dave Cochrane. After applying unsuccessfully to join Napalm Death as a vocalist he later joined as drummer.

== Career ==
=== Napalm Death ===
Harris replaced Napalm Death's founding member Miles "The Rat" Ratledge as drummer in 1985. He was the driving force behind Scum and From Enslavement to Obliteration, being the only band member to play on both side A and side B of Scum. After the release of the EP Mentally Murdered, Napalm Death became more interested in the death metal scene and their sound started to move away from the British grindcore sound. At this point Bill Steer and Lee Dorrian departed the band. Harris left the band in 1991.

While in Napalm Death, Harris also played drums for Doom and Extreme Noise Terror, and participated in a side project with Mitch Harris called Defecation, which produced two records, Purity Dilution and Intention Surpassed, through Nuclear Blast. Harris contributed only to Purity Dilution. As a drummer he is generally credited with popularising the blast beat, which has since become a key component of much of extreme metal and grindcore. Harris coined the term grindcore, later commenting "Grindcore came from 'grind' which was the only word I could use to describe the Swans after buying their first record in '84 [...] I thought 'grind' really fit because of the speed, so I started to call it grindcore".

=== Assorted projects ===
He was contacted by John Zorn who wanted to create a new group consisting of himself, Harris and Bill Laswell on bass. This trio became Painkiller, a free jazz-extreme metal trio. The group released three albums in the early 1990s. Guts of a Virgin and Buried Secrets were released by Earache Records and contained mostly short aggressive tracks reminiscent of Napalm Death with the added elements of both John Zorn's sax and Bill Laswell's bass. Their third and last record, the two disc set Execution Ground was released in 1995 on the Subharmonic label. Harris later recalled how the first recording session with Painkiller led directly to his departure from Napalm Death. Working in a new context with Zorn and Laswell led Harris to realize he wanted to move on from his earlier work and explore different genres of music. In 2024, the band reunited with Harris playing electronic instruments to release several new albums.

Harris's other projects after Napalm Death included Quoit, Lull and Scorn, Harris has also collaborated with artists such as James Plotkin, Justin Broadrick and Martyn Bates.

In 2017, Mick Harris released his first new music in six years under the name of Fret with a new song called "Lift Method" that was released through SoundCloud. It was his first Fret material in 22 years. A new album called Over Depth was released in October 2017 as double vinyl / DL through Karlrecords.

He has collaborated with Eraldo Bernocchi and Bill Laswell on Equations of Eternity, which is an ambient dub music project started in 1995 by Bernocchi.

=== Scorn ===
Harris founded Scorn in 1991 with Napalm Death's original bassist/lead singer Nic Bullen. Scorn released several well-received albums and EPs in the early 1990s, creating a fusion of experimental heavy metal, electronic music, and dark dub music. Bullen left Scorn in 1995 and Harris continued to release albums exploring dark and minimalist industrial hip-hop territory, with a focus on extremely low and loud bass frequencies. Harris' work presaged dubstep. Scorn has been associated with Earache Records, Invisible Records, Hymen, Combat Records and Record Label Records. Refuse; Start Fires was released in 2010 on OHM Resistance. In November 2011, Harris announced that the Scorn project was "put to bed". Scorn returned in 2019 with an EP entitled Feather and an LP both released on Ohm Resistance. The LP was called Cafe Mor. It featured a contribution from Jason Williamson of Sleaford Mods and was mastered by Daniele Antezza of Dadub. The Only Place was released in 2021.

== Personal life ==
As of 2012, Harris was married to his wife, Helen. The couple have two children, Joshua and Narissa, and a granddaughter named Maya. Harris resides in Birmingham, where he works as a technician at a music college.
