= Me & Patsy Kickin' Up Dust =

2020 book by Loretta Lynn

- Authors: Loretta Lynn, Patsy Lynn Russell
- Cover artist: Phil Pascuzzo
- Language: English
- Subject: Patsy Cline, female friendship
- Genre: Music
- Publisher: Grand Central Publishing
- Publication date: April 7, 2020
- Publication place: United States
- Pages: 240
- ISBN: 9781538701669
- OCLC: 1147706105
- Preceded by: Honky Tonk Girl: My Life in Lyrics

Me & Patsy Kickin' Up Dust is a memoir by country singer Loretta Lynn and her daughter Patsy Lynn Russell, about Lynn's brief but formative friendship with fellow country singer Patsy Cline.

== Background ==
After producing the Loretta Lynn biopic Coal Miner's Daughter, movie producer Bernard Schwartz was asked by studio executives to explore filming the life of Lynn's best friend and mentor Patsy Cline, who was featured prominently in Lynn's book of the same title and the following successful movie. After Schwartz toured Tennessee and Virginia conducting interviews, the film Sweet Dreams was made. Interest in the pair of friends grew, and Lynn dedicated herself to pass the stories of Lynn and Cline's friendship to her daughter Patsy, Cline's namesake, born along with her twin Peggy in 1964 after Patsy Cline had died in a plane crash. The book is listed as being authored by Loretta Lynn with her daughter, and the stories Lynn told to Patsy are related to the reader in a first-person account. The book was published in 2020, with a foreword written by Dolly Parton.

== Summary ==
Loretta Lynn began her singing career at age 24, after bearing four children. Lynn and her husband Doo were living in Custer, Washington after moving from Kentucky in search of work. After praising his wife's singing to their children, in 1957 Doo Lynn bought his wife a Harmony guitar for $17. Lynn taught herself to play and began singing country radio hits as a hobby, but with the family struggling for money, her husband pressed her to perform publicly to supplement their income. Throughout the book, Lynn stresses the sincere support and persistence of her husband as being the reason for her pursuing a music career, stating that she in fact "just wanted to sing for my kids".

Lynn first became an admirer of Patsy Cline after seeing her first national television appearance on Arthur Godfrey's Talent Scouts shortly after receiving the guitar. After performing "Walkin' After Midnight", Cline won the show's talent competition by gaining the highest applause volume on the program. Lynn remembers watching the show, writing:

She was as good as Hank Williams, maybe better—and she was a woman! That was a new thing, newer than television, maybe even. The audience loved her. On Arthur Godfrey's show it was the applause that told who won the contest. A little meter showed whether folks were clapping hard or not. When Patsy sang, that arrow went right to the top of the dial! I'd of voted for her, too, if I wasn't three thousand miles away. When she won, I remember Mr. Godfrey asked if she was happy. Patsy said, "Happy as if I had good sense." I remember chuckling at that. She was funny, and that made me like her even more.

Performing at bars and clubs in Washington proved successful for Lynn. In 1960 while driving to radio stations throughout the West Coast to promote her first record release, the single "I'm a Honky Tonk Girl", Lynn met the country duo The Wilburn Brothers. The Wilburns also ran a music publishing company and a talent agency, and soon after meeting the pair Lynn wrote them a letter asking questions about Nashville and the Grand Ole Opry, where she dreamt of performing. The Wilburns replied to her that with "I'm a Honky Tonk Girl" at #14 on the country charts, she "had a good chance" and invited her to Nashville. The Lynns moved to Tennessee, and Loretta was eventually able to perform both on the Opry and an after-show program broadcast live from The Ernest Tubb Record Shop across the street, Midnite Jamboree.

=== Meeting ===
Patsy Cline had recently released the hit single "I Fall to Pieces" when, on June 14, 1961, she and her brother were struck head-on in a car accident. Cline nearly died as a result of her injuries. While she was recovering, the close-knit country music community continued to follow her health progress. After an Opry performance, Lynn went to The Ernest Tubb Record Shop and asked Tubb if she could perform "I Fall to Pieces" on Midnite Jamboree. Tubb agreed, and Lynn performed the song after saying on air "Patsy, if you're a-listenin', this song's for you. 'I Fall to Pieces'. I hope you get well real soon." Lynn, who had not yet met Patsy Cline, was soon approached by Charlie Dick, Cline's husband who with his wife had heard the broadcast. Dick told her both were impressed and asked Lynn to come with him to the hospital and meet the star singer. In the book, Lynn remarks that she felt as though Cline treated her as an equal and was very supportive of her. A mentoring relationship began there in the hospital, with Lynn eventually learning that Cline promoted a strong female presence in Nashville and also mentored Brenda Lee, Dottie West, June Carter, and other rising female talent. After the meeting in the hospital, the two became close friends, with Cline regularly giving advice, encouragement, and clothing to Lynn while confiding in her as she struggled with her appearance after the accident.

=== Big sister ===
Once they became friends, Patsy Cline mentored Lynn as would a big sister. Cline teaches Lynn how to wear makeup, how to dress for the stage, and how to shave her legs, which Lynn admits to never having done. Lynn seeks out Cline for help with having Doo Lynn show more affection for her in public, and is told about sexual adventurousness, with Cline offering Lynn advice on sex and giving her a pair of lingerie, which results in Lynn soon having her first climax with her husband after 15 years of marriage.

=== Leader of a female revolution in country music ===
Several times Lynn describes Nashville in 1961-63 as close knit, and as less of a tourist destination, a city much different from Nashville in 2020 when Lynn was writing. Lynn writes, "We were here way before Nashville was the destination it is nowadays, with hundreds of thousands of fans coming to see country music artists perform. It was just a little town, really." In that context, Cline teaches Lynn about men, and men in power. Lynn credits Cline with successfully challenging the music industry's male dominance, and helping Lynn manage her finances. Lynn quotes Cline as saying about the Wilburns, "Hells bells, Loretta! Those boys are your managers, not your bosses!" Cline remarks about not being paid by a club after performing, and tells Lynn to demand half payment first. Lynn then describes an atmosphere where people were expected to be polite and low-key, and deferential if female, when discussing business. She explains that Patsy Cline taught her how to be assertive, and showed her by consistently getting what she wanted.

=== Spirit visitation ===
Me & Patsy Kickin' Up Dust begins with Lynn recalling sitting with Patsy Cline's casket in Cline's living room in 1963 after the plane crash that killed her. Both while Cline was living and after, words from – or visions of – an alive, talking Patsy Cline appear to Lynn several times in the book as an apparition. When sitting alone with Cline's closed casket, Lynn describes feeling very cold, and even though she was alone in the room, spoke about the chill. Lynn says she then heard Cline talk to her, "plain as day", saying to her "Well, turn up the damn heat!", which Lynn obeyed. Often when Lynn is experiencing hopelessness or fear in the book, she writes that a vision of Patsy Cline would appear and speak to her, including while she was on stage, to give her encouragement. On the day Cline died, according to Lynn she had heard a voice singing in the wind, and couldn't hear what was being sung. She writes that later, she felt it was Patsy sending an S.O.S. as in a line from Cline's song "I'll Sail My Ship Alone".

== Reception ==
Critical reviews of Me & Patsy Kickin' Up Dust are positive, with most comments pertaining to the fast and strong bond that developed between the two during their brief friendship before Cline's death on March 5, 1963. Writing in The Boot, Lorie Liebig relates stories of spiritual connection from the book, repeating Lynn's reaction to Brandi Carlile's performance at Lynn's 87th birthday party, with Lynn saying Cline would have loved that and remarking "I'm sure she was listening." The New York Times used the occasion of the publication of Me & Patsy Kickin' Up Dust to quiz Loretta Lynn on what she felt about reading and lists comments from Lynn on several of her favorite books. The strength of Cline's commitment to other women country performers and her generosity and huge impact on the history of country music as told in the book were highlighted in a retrospective prior to the broadcast of Opry 100: A Live Celebration on NBC in March 2025.

== Sources ==
Lynn, Loretta; Russell, Patsy Lynn (2020). Me & Patsy Kickin' up Dust : My Friendship with Patsy Cline (1st ed.). New York: Grand Central Publishing.
