= The Darkest Day =

Single by Loretta Lynn
- B-side: "Gonna Pack My Troubles"
- Released: May 1961
- Recorded: 1960
- Studio: Western Recorders
- Genre: Country; Bakersfield Sound
- Length: 2:20
- Label: Zero
- Songwriter: Loretta Lynn
- Producer: Don Grashey

Loretta Lynn singles chronology
"Heartaches Meet Mr. Blues" (1960)	"The Darkest Day" (1961)	"I Walked Away from the Wreck" (1961)

"The Darkest Day" is a song written and originally recorded by American country singer-songwriter Loretta Lynn. It was released as her third single in her career and was issued on the Zero Records label. The song was later re-recorded by Lynn in 1966 for the album You Ain’t Woman Enough, and also again for her 2018 album Wouldn’t It Be Great.

== Background and content ==
Earlier in 1960, Loretta Lynn released her debut single called "I'm a Honky Tonk Girl." Self-promoting the song for several months, the effort paid off when the single reached number 14 on the Billboard Hot Country Singles chart. One of Lynn's self-compositions was chosen for her next single release. The track was recorded at the Western Recorders studio in 1960. It was Lynn's second recording session in career. The studio was located in Hollywood, California was produced by Don Grashey. The song was recorded in style of country music known as the Bakersfield Sound. The style was popular with country artists who recorded on the west coast of the United States. It was a style popularized by artists such as Merle Haggard and Buck Owens. While Lynn was at the Zero label, her music mostly identified with this sub-genre.

== Release and reception ==
"The Darkest Day" was released in May 1961 and was Lynn's third single issued on the Zero label. It was also Lynn's final Zero single release. She would later sign a contract with Decca Records and remain there until the late 1980s. It was issued as a 7" single and included the song "Gonna Pack My Troubles" on the B-side. Despite the success of her previous single, "The Darkest Day" did not reach any chart positions on the Billboard country chart following its release. Lynn did not have another charting single until 1962.

The single was later reviewed by Peter Stenshoel of Scpr.org while reviewing a compilation featuring the recording. He praised the song and commented on its storyline: "If anybody can write a bleak lyric, it's Loretta Lynn. "The Darkest Day" is especially aching, with its ironic thrust: "Darling when you told me you were leavin', I thought that you were only foolin' me." In 2018, Lynn re-recorded the song for her studio album Wouldn't It Be Great.

== Track listing ==
7" vinyl single

- "The Darkest Day" – 2:20
- "Gonna Pack My Troubles" – 2:00
