= Colin Richardson =

British record producer

Colin Richardson is a British record producer, mixer and recording engineer. He has worked on over 100 albums and is most frequently associated with heavy metal and its subgenres.

== Discography ==
Release year	Artist	Album	Role
1982	The Membranes	Pin Stripe Hype (EP)	Producer, Engineer
1983	The Chameleons	Script of the Bridge	Producer, Engineer
1985	The Chameleons	What Does Anything Mean? Basically	Producer (tracks 1–10)
1986	GBH	Clay Years 1981–1984	Engineer
1989	Napalm Death	Mentally Murdered (EP)	Engineer
1989	Bolt Thrower	Realm of Chaos	Mixing,
1989	Carcass	Symphonies of Sickness	Producer, Engineer
1990	The Exploited	The Massacre	Producer
1991	Bolt Thrower	Cenotaph (EP)	Producer (tracks 1–3)
1991	Bolt Thrower	War Master	Producer, Engineer, Recording
1991	Massacre	From Beyond	Producer
1991	Gorefest	Mindloss	Producer
1991	Carcass	Necroticism – Descanting the Insalubrious	Producer, Mixing
1992	Brutal Truth	Ill Neglect (EP)	Recording
1992	Napalm Death	Utopia Banished	Producer, Engineer
1992	Mercyless	Abject Offerings	Producer<
1992	Carcass	Tools of the Trade (EP)	Producer
1992	Fear Factory	Soul of a New Machine	Producer, Mixing
1992	Brutal Truth	Extreme Conditions Demand Extreme Responses	Producer
1992	Gorefest	False	Producer, Recording, Engineer
1992	Bolt Thrower	The IVth Crusade	Producer, Recording
1993	Gorguts	The Erosion of Sanity	Mixing
1993	S.O.B.	Gate of Doom	Mixing
1993	Bolt Thrower	Spearhead (EP)	Producer
1993	Disincarnate	Dreams of the Carrion Kind	Producer, Mixing
1993	Brutal Truth	Perpetual Conversion (EP)	Producer (track 3)
1993	Crusher	Act II: Undermine! (EP)	Producer, Mixing
1993	Mercyless	Coloured Funeral	Producer, Engineer, Mixing
1993	Carcass	Heartwork	Producer
1993	Sinister	Diabolical Summoning	Producer, Engineer
1993	Loudblast	Cross the Threshold (EP)	Producer, Mixing
1994	Brutal Truth	Godplayer (EP)	Mixing
1994	Carcass	The Heartwork EP	Mixing
1994	Napalm Death	Fear, Emptiness, Despair	Mixing
1994	S.O.B.	Vicious World	Producer
1994	Machine Head	Burn My Eyes	Producer, Mixing
1994	Brutal Truth	Need to Control	Mixing
1994	Crash	Endless Supply of Pain	Producer, Engineer
1994	Baby Chaos	Safe Sex Designer Drugs & the Death of Rock 'N' Roll	Mixing
1994	Bolt Thrower	...For Victory	Producer
1995	Fear Factory	Demanufacture	Producer
1995	Various	Mortal Kombat	Producer (track 9)
1995	Napalm Death	Greed Killing (EP)	Producer, Mixing
1996	Napalm Death	Diatribes	Producer, Mixing
1996	The Exploited	Beat the Bastards	Producer, Mixing
1996	Dearly Beheaded	Temptation	Producer
1996	Carcass	Swansong	Producer
1997	Uncle Meat	Underneath	Producer, Mixing
1997	Crash	Experiment State of Fear	Producer, Mixing
1997	Machine Head	The More Things Change...	Producer, Co-mixing
1997	Napalm Death	Inside the Torn Apart	Producer, co-mixing
1997	Overkill	From the Underground and Below	Mixing
1997	Dearly Beheaded	Chamber of One	Producer
1997	Napalm Death	Breed to Breathe (EP)	Producer
1998	Hamlet	Insomnio	Producer, Recording, Mixing
1998	Loudblast	Fragments	Mixing
1998	Pulkas	Greed	Producer, Engineer
1998	Napalm Death	Words from the Exit Wound	Producer, Mixing
1999	Anonymus	Instinct	Producer, Mixing
1999	Mass Hysteria	Contraddiction	Producer, Recording, Mixing (tracks 1–11), Mastering
1999	Liberty 37	Oh River EP	Producer (tracks 1–3, 5, 6), Recording, Mixing
1999	Liberty 37	The Greatest Gift	Producer, Recording, Mixing
1999	Cannibal Corpse	Bloodthirst	Producer
1999	Overkill	Coverkill	Mixing
2000	Crash	Terminal Dream Flow	Producer, Recording, Engineer, Mixing
2000	One Minute Silence	Buy Now... Saved Later	Producer, Mixing
2000	Hamlet	El Inferno	Producer, Recording, Mixing
2000	Cannibal Corpse	Live Cannibalism	Mixing
2000	Overkill	Bloodletting	Mixing
2001	SugarComa	What Goes Around (EP)	Producer
2001	Mass Hysteria	De cercle en cercle	Producer, Recording, Mixing (tracks 1–6, 8, 10–13)
2001	Machine Head	Supercharger	Mixing
2001	Anathema	A Fine Day to Exit	Mixing
2001	Godflesh	Hymns	Engineer
2002	Five Pointe O	Untitled	Producer, Engineer, Mixing
2002	Cyclefly	Crave	Producer
2002	Hamlet	Hamlet	Producer, Recording, Mixing
2002	SugarComa	Becoming Something Else	Producer
2002	Murderdolls	Beyond the Valley of the Murderdolls	Mixing (track 20)
2002	Sepultura	Under a Pale Grey Sky	Mixing
2002	Slipknot	Disasterpieces	Mixing
2003	InMe	Overgrown Eden	Producer, Mixing
2003	Machine Head	Hellalive	Mixing
2003	Overkill	Killbox 13	Producer, Mixing, Engineer
2003	Chimaira	The Impossibility of Reason	Mixing
2003	Sikth	The Trees Are Dead & Dried Out Wait for Something Wild	Mixing (tracks 1–7, 10–13)
2003	Funeral for a Friend	Casually Dressed & Deep in Conversation	Producer, Engineer, Mixing
2003	Funeral for a Friend	Seven Ways to Scream Your Name (EP)	Producer, Engineer, Mixing (tracks 5–7)
2003	Machine Head	Through the Ashes of Empires	Mixing
2003	God Forbid	Better Days (EP)	Mixing
2004	God Forbid	Gone Forever	Mixing
2004	Slipknot	Vol. 3: (The Subliminal Verses)	Mixing (bonus disc, tracks 5–7)
2004	Cradle of Filth	Nymphetamine	Mixing
2004	3 Inches of Blood	Advance and Vanquish	Mixing
2004	Bullet for My Valentine	Bullet for My Valentine (EP)	Producer, Mixing
2005	Lamb of God	Burn the Priest	Remixing, Remastering
2005	Wednesday 13	Transylvania 90210: Songs of Death, Dying, and the Dead	Mixing
2005	DevilDriver	The Fury of Our Maker's Hand	Producer, Mixing, Engineer
2005	Chimaira	Chimaira	Mixing
2005	Bullet for My Valentine	Hand of Blood (EP)	Producer, Mixing
2005	Bullet for My Valentine	The Poison	Producer, Mixing (tracks 1–5, 7–13)
2005	Roadrunner United	The All-Star Sessions	Mixing (tracks 1–3, 6, 7, 9, 15, 16)
2005	Slipknot	9.0: Live	Mixing
2006	Fightstar	Grand Unification	Producer, Mixing
2006	Hostility	Uncompromised	Mixing
2006	Hamlet	Pura Vida	Mixing
2006	Trivium	The Crusade	Mixing
2006	Slipknot	Voliminal: Inside the Nine	Mixing (select tracks)
2007	Dååth	The Hinderers	Mixing
2007	Machine Head	The Blackening	Producer, Mixing
2007	Sanctity	Road to Bloodshed	Mixing
2007	As I Lay Dying	An Ocean Between Us	Mixing
2008	Bullet for My Valentine	Scream Aim Fire	Producer, Mixing
2008	Slipknot	All Hope Is Gone	Mixing
2008	Trivium	Shogun	Mixing
2009	Kreator	Hordes of Chaos	Mixing
2009	Behemoth	Evangelion	Mixing
2009	Rodrigo y Gabriela	11:11	Mixing
2010	Eluveitie	Everything Remains as It Never Was	Mixing
2010	As I Lay Dying	The Powerless Rise	Mixing
2010	Tarja Turunen	What Lies Beneath	Mixing (select tracks)
2011	Sydonia	"Ocean of Storms"	Mixing
2011	Trivium	In Waves	Producer Mixing
2011	Rise to Remain	City of Vultures	Producer, Mixing
2012	Callejon	Blitzkreuz	Mixing
2012	While She Sleeps	This Is the Six	Co-mixing
2012	As I Lay Dying	Awakened	Mixing
2013	Heaven Shall Burn	Veto	Mixing (Blizzard Over England Mix)
2013	Carcass	Surgical Steel	Producer
2013	Trivium	Vengeance Falls	Mixing
2014	Wovenwar	Wovenwar	Mixing, Engineer
2014	Machine Head	Bloodstone & Diamonds	Mixing
2014	Carcass	Surgical Remission/Surplus Steel (EP)	Producer
2015	While She Sleeps	Brainwashed	Co-mixing
2015	Bullet for My Valentine	Venom	Producer, Mixing, Engineer
2016	Bullet for My Valentine	"Don't Need You"	Producer, Mixing
2020	Those Damn Crows	Point of No Return	Producer, Recording, Mixing
2020	Ex Deo	"The Philosopher King"	Mixing
2020	Anonymus	La bestia	Producer (track 8)
2020	Machine Head	Civil Unrest (EP)	Mixing
2020	Kataklysm	Unconquered	Mixing
2022	Machine Head	Of Kingdom and Crown	Mixing
2022	Invictus	Unstoppable	Mixing (additional)
2023	Overkill	Scorched	Mixing
2023	Kataklysm	Goliath	Mixing (additional), Mastering (assistant)
2025	Machine Head	Unatoned	Mixing (tracks 2–6, 8–12)
