= Coal Miner's Daughter =

Coal Miner's Daughter may refer to:

- "Coal Miner's Daughter" (song), a 1969 song by Loretta Lynn
- Coal Miner's Daughter (album), a 1971 album by Loretta Lynn
- Coal Miner's Daughter (film), a 1980 film about American singer Loretta Lynn
  - Coal Miner's Daughter: Original Motion Picture Soundtrack, the 1980 Coal Miner's Daughter film soundtrack
- Loretta Lynn: Coal Miner's Daughter, a 1976 autobiography by Loretta Lynn and George Vecsey
- Coal Miner's Daughter: A Tribute to Loretta Lynn, a 2010 album by various artists
