= Heartaches Meet Mr. Blues =

Single by Loretta Lynn
- B-side: "New Rainbow"
- Released: August 1960
- Recorded: February 1960
- Studio: Western Recorders
- Genre: Country; Bakersfield Sound
- Length: 2:03
- Label: Zero
- Songwriter(s): Loretta Lynn
- Producer(s): Don Grashey

Loretta Lynn singles chronology
"I'm a Honky Tonk Girl" (1960)	"Heartaches Meet Mr. Blues" (1960)	"The Darkest Day" (1961)

"Heartaches Meet Mr. Blues" is a song written and originally recorded by American country singer-songwriter Loretta Lynn. It was released as a single on Zero Records in 1960 and was produced by Don Grashey. The song was Lynn's second single release in her career and would be one of three she would record for the Zero label before moving to Decca Records in 1961.

== Background and content ==
In 1960, Loretta Lynn had her first major hit with the self-penned "I'm a Honky Tonk Girl." The song gained traction after Lynn and her husband traveled from radio station to radio station self-promoting song. Later that year, the single reached the national country charts, peaking at number 14. The song's success prompted Lynn's record label to release a follow-up single, which resulted in the release of "Heartaches Meet Mr. Blues." Like her previous release, the song was composed by Lynn herself. Lynn recorded the track in her first session at her label, which was also her first recording session in her career. The session took place in February 1960 at the Western Recorders Studio located in Hollywood, California.

To record the song, Lynn and her husband drove from their home in Washington state to California where they were produced by Don Grashey at Western Recorders. Grashey brought in several notable west coast studio musicians to play on the record. This included Harold Hensley and Speedy West. Lynn also recorded "Honky Tonk Girl" during the same session. The song was recorded in style of country music known as the Bakersfield Sound. The style was popular with country artists who recorded on the west coast of the United States. It was a style popularized by artists such as Merle Haggard and Buck Owens. While Lynn was at the Zero label, her music mostly identified with this sub-genre.

== Release ==
"Heartaches Meet Mr. Blues" was released as the follow-up single to "I'm a Honky Tonk Girl". It was issued in August 1960 via Zero Records and was Lynn's second single release in her career. The single was issued as a 7" vinyl single and included a song on its B-side, "New Rainbow." The song was published by Tri-Lite Music Publications. Although her previous single had been a hit, "Heartaches Meet Mr. Blues" did not chart any Billboard publications, most notably the Hot Country Singles chart. Lynn would not have another hit until moving to Nashville, Tennessee and signing with the larger Decca Records in 1961. Her second single on the label, "Success," would be a top ten hit and start a series of major hits for Lynn over the next three decades.

== Track listing ==
7" vinyl single

- "Heartaches Meet Mr. Blues" – 2:03
- "New Rainbow" – 2:46
