= Honky-Tonk Girl =

Honky-Tonk Girl may refer to:

- "Honky-Tonk Girl" (Hank Thompson song), a 1954 song by Hank Thompson, notably covered in 1960 by Johnny Cash
- "I'm a Honky Tonk Girl", a 1960 song by Loretta Lynn
- Honky Tonk Girl: My Life in Lyrics, 2012 book by Loretta Lynn
