= Insomnio (Hamlet album) =

Studio album by Hamlet
- Released: 1998
- Studio: The Chapel Studios, Lincolnshire, England
- Genre: Nu metal, groove metal
- Length: 41:11
- Label: Zero Records
- Producer: Colin Richardson

Hamlet chronology
Revolución 12.111 (1996)	Insomnio (1998)	El Inferno (2000)

Insomnio is the fourth release by Spanish metal band Hamlet. It is the first nu metal-oriented album by Hamlet and the first album of this genre in Spain. The band claims Insomnio as their most important LP.

== Track listing ==
1. "Tortura-Visión"
2. "Tu Medicina"
3. "Dementes Cobardes"
4. "Quién cree que Raquel se suicidó"
5. "1998"
6. "Antes y Después"
7. "Muérdesela"
8. "Dónde duermo hoy"
9. "Mal"
10. "Tan simple como decir no"
11. "Lacabra"
12. "Odio"

== Personnel ==
- J. Molly – vocals
- Luis Tárraga – lead guitar
- Pedro Sánchez – rhythm guitar
- Augusto Hernández – bass, chorus
- Paco Sánchez – drums

=== Production ===
- Produced and mixed by Colin Richardson
- Recorded at the Chapel Studios, Lincolnshire, U.K.
- Mastered at The Exchange by Guy Davie, London U.K.
