= The DVD (Napalm Death video) =

Video by Napalm Death
- Released: 15 October 2001
- Genre: Grindcore
- Label: Earache
- Producer: Napalm Death

Napalm Death chronology
Enemy of the Music Business (2000)	The DVD (2001)	Order of the Leech (2002)

The DVD is a Napalm Death DVD released by Earache in 2001. The only material seeing release for the first time is the Nottingham show from 1989 and the ULU show from 1989. The version of Utopia Banished currently in print features The DVD as a bonus disc.

== Live at Salisbury Arts Centre - 30 June 1990 (Live Corruption) ==
No.	Title	Length
1.	"Control"
2.	"Walls of Confinement"
3.	"Unchallenged Hate"
4.	"Life?"
5.	"The Kill"
6.	"Scum"
7.	"If the Truth Be Known"
8.	"Lucid Fairytale"
9.	"Malicious Intent"
10.	"Social Sterility"
11.	"Suffer the Children"
12.	"From Enslavement to Obliteration"
13.	"Dead"
14.	"Practise What You Preach"
15.	"Mentally Murdered"
16.	"Extremity Retained"
17.	"Mind Snare"
18.	"Success?"
19.	"Rise Above"
20.	"Instinct of Survival"
21.	"Siege of Power"
22.	"You Suffer"
23.	"Deceiver"

- Note: the setlist is scrambled for the video version of Live Corruption. The actual setlist is on the CD version.

== Live at Nottingham Rock City - 14 November 1989 ==
No.	Title	Length
1.	"Rise Above"
2.	"Life?"
3.	"The Kill"
4.	"Walls of Confinement"
5.	"Deceiver"
6.	"Dead"
7.	"Siege of Power"
8.	"M.A.D"
9.	"Retreat to Nowhere"
10.	"Scum"
11.	"From Enslavement to Obliteration"
12.	"The Missing Link"
13.	"Negative Approach"
14.	"Mentally Murdered"
15.	"Human Garbage"
16.	"Stigmatized"
17.	"Control"
18.	"Success?"
19.	"Social Sterility"
20.	"Instinct of Survival"
21.	"You Suffer"
22.	"Practise What You Preach"
23.	"Unchallenged Hate"
24.	"Siege of Power"
25.	"You Suffer"
26.	"Dead"
27.	"Deceiver"

== Live at University of London Union - 23 February 1989 (BBC TV 'Arena' Heavy Metal Special) ==
No.	Title	Length
1.	"Scum"
2.	"You Suffer"

== Promo Clips ==
- Suffer the Children
- Mass Appeal Madness
- The World Keeps Turning
- Plague Rages
- Greed Killing
- Breed to Breathe (uncensored)

== Credits ==
Salisbury Arts Centre - 30 June 1990

- Mark "Barney" Greenway - vocals
- Jesse Pintado - guitar
- Mitch Harris - guitar
- Shane Embury - bass
- Mick Harris - drums

Nottingham Rock City - 14 November 1989

- Mark "Barney" Greenway - vocals
- Jesse Pintado - guitars
- Shane Embury - bass
- Mick Harris - drums

London Killburn National - 1989

- Lee Dorrian - vocals
- Bill Steer - guitars
- Shane Embury - bass
- Mick Harris - drums
