= El Inferno =

Studio album by Hamlet
- Released: June 2000
- Recorded: 1999
- Studio: The Chapel, in Lincolnshire
- Genre: Nu metal, alternative metal
- Length: 39:48
- Label: Zero Records
- Producer: Colin Richardson

Hamlet chronology
| Insomnio (1998) | El Inferno (2000) | Hamlet (2002) |

El Inferno is the fifth studio album by the Spanish alternative metal band Hamlet. Musically it resembles Insomnio, but lacks the hardcore elements from previous albums. Also, the lyrics are more introspective.

== Track listing ==
1. El mejor amigo de nadie
2. Vivir es una ilusión
3. ¿Por qué?
4. Buena suerte
5. No soy igual
6. Miserable
7. Perdóname
8. Denuncio a Dios
9. No me arrepiento
10. Mi nombre es yo
11. Lárgate despacio

== Members ==
- J. Molly – Vocals
- Luis Tárraga – Lead guitar
- Pedro Sánchez – Rhythm guitar
- Augusto Hernández – Bass, chorus
- Paco Sánchez – Drums

== Sources ==
- Info of the album
- Info in zona-zero.net
