= Death by Manipulation =

Compilation album by Napalm Death
- Released: 19 August 1991
- Genre: Grindcore; death metal
- Length: 51:27
- Label: Relativity/Earache
- Producer: Napalm Death

Napalm Death chronology
Mass Appeal Madness (1991)	Death by Manipulation (1991)	Utopia Banished (1992)

Professional ratings
Review scores
Source	Rating
AllMusic	4/5 stars
The Encyclopedia of Popular Music	2/5 stars
Spin Alternative Record Guide	7/10

Death by Manipulation is a compilation album of EPs by British band Napalm Death. It was released on 19 August 1991.

== Critical reception ==
AllMusic wrote: "Overall, Death by Manipulation not only captures this infamous band undergoing a controversial transition, but also serves as an excellent compilation for listeners curious about the band's different musical phases."

== Track listing ==
No.	Title	Length
1.	"Mass Appeal Madness"	3:29
2.	"Pride Assassin"	2:05
3.	"Unchallenged Hate"	2:07
4.	"Social Sterility"	1:13
5.	"Suffer the Children"	4:20
6.	"Siege of Power"	3:33
7.	"Harmony Corruption (instrumental)"	3:32
8.	"Rise Above"	2:42
9.	"The Missing Link"	2:17
10.	"Mentally Murdered"	2:11
11.	"Walls of Confinement"	2:56
12.	"Cause and Effect"	1:26
13.	"No Mental Effort"	4:08
14.	"Multinational Corporations Pt. 2"	1:32
15.	"Re-address the Problem"	0:33
16.	"Changing Colours"	0:57
17.	"From the Ashes"	0:49
18.	"Understanding"	0:07
19.	"Stalemate"	1:09

U.S. release bonus tracks (from 1992 live album Live Corruption)
No.	Title	Length
20.	"Unchallenged Hate (live)"	2:16
21.	"Mentally Murdered (live)"	4:53
22.	"Walls of Confinement (live)"	3:12
Total length:		51:27

Tracks 1–4 are from the Mass Appeal Madness EP. Tracks 5–7 are from the "Suffer the Children" single. Tracks 8–13 are from the Mentally Murdered EP. Tracks 14–19 are from the Napalm Death/S.O.B. split 7-inch EP. Tracks 20–22 are from Live Corruption, recorded at the Salisbury Arts Centre on 30 June 1990. The Live Corruption tracks are only available on the United States edition.

== Personnel ==
=== Tracks 1–7, 20–22 ===
- Mark "Barney" Greenway – lead vocals
- Jesse Pintado – guitar
- Mitch Harris – guitar
- Shane Embury – bass
- Mick Harris – drums, backing vocals

=== Tracks 8–19 ===
- Lee Dorrian – vocals
- Bill Steer – guitars
- Shane Embury – bass
- Mick Harris – drums
