= Honky Tonk Girl: My Life in Lyrics =

2012 book by Loretta Lynn

- Author: Loretta Lynn
- Cover artist: Carol Devine Carson
- Language: English
- Genre: Music
- Publisher: Alfred A. Knopf, Inc.
- Publication date: April 3, 2012
- Publication place: United States/Canada
- Pages: 223
- ISBN: 978-0-307-59489-1
- OCLC: 769232468
- Preceded by: Still Woman Enough
- Followed by: Me & Patsy Kickin' Up Dust

Honky Tonk Girl: My Life in Lyrics is a collection of lyrics and personal recollections from Loretta Lynn. Published in 2012, the book relates life experiences as told by Lynn through commentary on the songs, performers, and other important people surrounding the singer throughout her career.

The title of the book refers to Lynn's first single release, "I'm a Honky Tonk Girl", issued in March 1960 by Zero Records. In the book, Lynn distinguishes the two sides of the single as being both her "very first lyric" and "first song". She relates writing B-side "Whispering Sea" lyrics suddenly, after fishing with her husband when the Lynns lived in Washington: "I don't know why I just sat down and wrote a song. But I remember being shocked that those lyrics just came pourin' out of me." A-side "I'm a Honky Tonk Girl" was written after Lynn sought out a sad-looking patron at the club where she was performing, learning of the woman's cheating husband and abandoned children, writing "Then we both cried. That night I wrote this song about her. It was the very first song I wrote." Along with similar anecdotes about her songs and songwriting, the book features 105 photographs, some previously unpublished song lyrics, and a foreword written by Elvis Costello.
