= Sanatorio de Muñecos =

Studio album by Hamlet
- Released: 1993
- Recorded: June 1993
- Studio: Morrisound Studios, Tampa, Florida
- Genre: Groove metal, alternative metal, rap metal
- Length: 49:07
- Label: Escila/Romilar D, Zero Records
- Producer: Tom Morris

Hamlet chronology
| Peligroso (1992) | Sanatorio de Muñecos (1993) | Revolución 12.111 (1996) |

Sanatorio de Muñecos is the second album by the Spanish heavy metal band Hamlet.

The band considered this album as "the real first album", because their previous album Peligroso had very bad production values and a heavy metal/hard rock sound. This release would include rap vocals, funk bass and guitars riffs from hardcore punk, groove metal, thrash metal, and alternative metal, and would reflect the sound the band would have live. The band moved in the summer of 1993 to Morrisound Studios in Tampa, Florida to have the album recorded by owner and producer Tom Morris.

This is the first album with drummer Paco Sánchez.

== Track listing ==
1. Irracional
2. Perdón por vivir
3. Reza
4. Ceremonia T.V.
5. Qué voy a hacer
6. Sacrificar (sacrifícame)
7. Al Lado
8. Coeficiente deprimente
9. Quien
10. Repulsa total
11. Basta
12. Eso sí lo haces bien
13. Discriminación

== Members ==
- J. Molly - Vocals
- Luis Tárraga - Lead guitar
- Pedro Sánchez - Rhythm guitar
- Augusto Hernández - Bass, chorus
- Paco Sánchez - Drums

== Production credits ==
Recorded in June, 1993 in Morrisound Studios, Tampa, FL., USA. Mastered at Fullersound, Miami, Florida, USA.

== Sources ==
- Info of the remastered version
- Review on mirdalternativa.com
- Info in zona-zero.net
