= Revolución 12.111 =

Studio album by Hamlet
- Released: June 23, 1996
- Studio: Morrisound Recording
- Genre: Alt metal, rap metal, hardcore punk
- Length: 59:47
- Label: Zero
- Producer: Tom Morris

Hamlet chronology
Sanatorio de Muñecos (1994)	Revolución 12.111 (1996)	Insomnio (1998)

Revolución 12.111 is the third studio album by Spanish metal band Hamlet. Zero was created to release this album. The LP was recorded, produced and mixed by Tom Morris.

== Track listing ==
1. J.F.
2. Razismo es desigualdad
3. Poseer bajo sumisión
4. Egoísmo
5. No me jodas
6. El color de los pañuelos
7. Creerse Dios
8. La tierra de Paco
9. Legalizar
10. El pequeño dictador
11. Crónica Antisocial
12. La pesadilla
13. Habitación 106
14. Hombre del 2000
15. No invasión

== Personnel ==
- J. Molly – vocals
- Luis Tárraga – lead guitar
- Pedro Sánchez – rhythm guitar
- Augusto Hernández – bass, chorus
- Paco Sánchez – drums
