= Greed (Pulkas album) =

- Digital cover

Studio album by Pulkas
- Released: 27 April 1998
- Genre: Nu metal; alternative metal
- Label: Earache Records
- Producer: Colin Richardson

Greed is the debut and only album by the English nu metal band Pulkas.

== Reception ==
Writing for Chronicles of Chaos, Adrian Bromley praised the album, stating that the band "has managed to capture a vibe of metal music that seems too hard to find nowadays". The instrumentation of the band has been compared to that of Tool and Neurosis.

In retrospective reviews, Greed has been described as having "aged surprisingly well and hasn’t dated anywhere near as much as the likes of One Minute Silence et al". A 2020 list of "one-album wonders" by Louder Sound considered it "an unbelievable slab of alt. metal perfection".

== Track listing ==
No.	Title	Length
1.	"Loaded"	3:57
2.	"Rubber Room"	3:34
3.	"Drown"	1:12
4.	"Hippy Fascist"	5:00
5.	"Betrayal"	4:18
6.	"Control"	4:24
7.	"This Is It"	3:38
8.	"Rebirth"	4:32
9.	"Flesh"	3:56
10.	"Eh?"	0:39
11.	"Close to the Enemy"	5:30

== Music videography ==
A music video was released for the song "Loaded".

== Personnel ==
- Luke Lloyd – vocals
- Martin Bourne – guitar
- Jules McBride – bass
- Rob Lewis – drums
