= Amnesia (Hamlet album) =

Studio album by Hamlet
- Released: September 26, 2011
- Recorded: Sadman Studios in Madrid, Spain.
- Genre: Groove metal
- Length: 45:25
- Label: Kaiowas Records
- Producer: Carlos Santos

Hamlet chronology
La Puta y el Diablo (2009)	Amnesia (2011)	La Ira (2015)

Amnesia is the tenth studio album by Spanish metal band Hamlet. The album was recorded and produced in Spain with producer Carlos Santos at Sadman Studios, and mixed and mastered in Sweden by Fredrik Nordström and Henrik Udd at Studio Fredman (In Flames, Soilwork, Opeth).

== Track listing ==
1. "Origen" - 1:39
2. "La Fuerza del Momento" - 3:38
3. "Entre la Niebla" - 4:41
4. "Mi Soledad" - 3:32
5. "Deja Vu" - 5:15
6. "La Sombra del Pasado" - 4:47
7. "Despertar Sin Vida" - 4:26
8. "Un Mundo en Pausa" - 4:01
9. "Estado de Fuga" - 3:48
10. "Al Tercer Dia" - 4:08
11. "Desesperacion" - 5:30

== Members ==
- J. Molly - Vocals
- Luis Tárraga - Lead/rhythm guitar
- Alberto Marín - Lead/rhythm guitar, backing vocals
- Álvaro Tenorio - Bass
- Paco Sánchez - Drums

== Sources ==
- info in zona-zero
- Review in mariskalrock.com
