= Oliver Lynn =

American married to Loretta Lynn (1926–1996)

Oliver "Mooney" Lynn
- Born: Oliver Vanetta Lynn Jr; August 27, 1926; Butcher Hollow, Kentucky, U.S.
- Died: August 22, 1996 (aged 69); Hurricane Mills, Tennessee, U.S.
- Resting place: Loretta Lynn’s Ranch, Hurricane Mills, Tennessee
- Other names: Doolittle Lynn, Mooney Lynn and Doo Lynn
- Occupations: Talent agent, President of Loretta Lynn Enterprises., Inc. (1973–1996,) Songwriter, Farmer and businessman
- Years active: 1958–1990
- Spouse: Loretta Webb (m. 1948)

Oliver Vanetta Lynn Jr. (August 27, 1926 – August 22, 1996), commonly known as Doolittle Lynn (also Doo and Mooney), was an American talent manager and country music figure, known as the husband of country music singer Loretta Lynn. Over the course of their often-tumultuous 48-year marriage, Lynn was instrumental in developing his wife's musical talent and country music career, purchasing her first guitar, lining up her first radio appearances, and serving as her de facto talent manager for many years. Lynn was also the President of Loretta Lynn Enterprises, Inc., a company formed in 1973 to take care of Lynn's businesses. He also worked on the farm he and his wife bought in 1966 and eventually opened as a tourist attraction. Lynn worked the land, and developed the first Loretta Lynn Rodeo in Goodlettsville in the early 1960s.

In addition to his ongoing support for his young wife's career, Lynn's relationship with his wife was described in the following: "[He] thought I was something special, more special than anyone in the world, and never let me forget it... Doo was my security, my safety net". He was also known to be violent, an alcoholic, and a womanizer who was a somewhat reluctant participant in his wife's life as a country music celebrity.

The couple's marriage, which began when he was 21 and she was 15, has been described by historians and music scholars as "one of the great legends of the twentieth century" and "one of the most compelling tales in American popular culture."

== Early life, family, and career ==
Oliver Vanetta Lynn Jr. was born August 27, 1926, in Butcher Hollow, Kentucky to Angie “Sissie” Webb Lynn (1903–1990) and Oliver Vanetta "Red" Lynn (1897–1981) as the oldest of seven. Of Irish descent, born in Butcher Hollow, near Paintsville, Kentucky in Johnson County, Oliver Lynn was an uneducated resident of a town based around the coal mining industry. Having served in the United States Army during World War II, he was uninterested in coal mining upon his return. He made a living selling moonshine, which earned him the nickname "Mooney." He earned the nickname "Doolittle"—which his wife Loretta shortened to "Doo"—because he was regarded by locals as a lazy person who didn't "do much." At age 20, Lynn met the 15-year-old Loretta Webb at a pie social, and a month later they married. A year later, the newlyweds relocated to Custer, Washington, as Lynn searched for better work opportunities. By the time his wife was 19, the couple had three children. Throughout the course of their marriage, the Lynns had six children: Betty Sue, Jack Benny, Clara Marie ("Cissy"), Ernest Ray, and twins Peggy Jean and Patsy Eileen (the latter named after Patsy Cline). Jack Benny Lynn predeceased his parents; Betty Sue Lynn died in 2013.

During the early years of their marriage, as described by Loretta Lynn in her autobiography Still Woman Enough:

I married Doo when I wasn't but a child, and he was my life from that day on. But as important as my youth and upbringing was, there's something else that made me stick to Doo. He thought I was something special, more special than anyone else in the world, and never let me forget it. That belief would be hard to shove out the door. Doo was my security, my safety net. And just remember, I'm explainin', not excusin'. (Still Woman Enough xvii) ... Doo was a good man and a hard worker. But he was an alcoholic, and it affected our marriage all the way through. He was also a womanizer. Cheating husbands have been all over the news talk shows for a few years now. Lots of women say they don't understand why women stay with them dogs. My story is about one who did—me.(Still Woman Enough, p. xiii).

In 1953, Lynn bought his 21-year old wife a guitar as an anniversary present and encouraged her to perform in local venues and on local radio. At a televised talent competition in Tacoma, Washington, Loretta Lynn was discovered by Norm Burley, who founded Vancouver, Canada-based label Zero Records solely to promote Loretta's music. As chronicled in the movie Coal Miner's Daughter, Lynn was instrumental at this stage of his wife's career, during which the couple dutifully set out across the country to promote her debut release "I'm a Honky Tonk Girl". The song managed to climb into the top twenty of the country charts, and the couple ended their trip in Nashville with a performance at the Grand Ole Opry.

Music scholar Martha Hume wrote:

When you shake all the stardust off this tale, what you must begin with is an uneducated child from one of the most isolated cultures in the United States who was given in marriage to a man some six years her senior, a man who was a violent and sometimes brutal alcoholic, who was similarly uneducated and without any job skills to speak of. Add to that a migration to the state of Washington, where the child had no friends or relations; the arrival of four babies; regular—and reportedly mutual—domestic violence; and an income so unstable that there were times when the family had nothing to eat but dandelion greens, and you have a situation that might well have led to murder. But what actually happened was so improbable, so unimaginable, that the lives of Loretta and Mooney Lynn became one of the great legends of the twentieth century.

== Death ==
Lynn died on August 22, 1996, aged 69. His death was attributed to diabetes-related health problems and heart failure. He was buried on the Lynn family estate in Hurricane Mills, Tennessee. Three days after her death on October 4, 2022, Lynn was buried next to her husband in a small ceremony.
