= Utopia Banished =

Studio album by Napalm Death
- Released: 18 May 1992 (UK); 23 June 1992 (US)
- Studios: The Windings, Wrexham, Wales
- Genre: Deathgrind
- Length: 39:04
- Labels: Earache, Relativity
- Producers: Colin Richardson, Napalm Death

Napalm Death chronology
Death by Manipulation (1991)	Utopia Banished (1992)	Fear, Emptiness, Despair (1994)

Professional ratings
Review scores
Source	Rating
AllMusic	2.5/5 stars
Collector's Guide to Heavy Metal	4/10
The Encyclopedia of Popular Music	3/5 stars
Select	4/5 stars
Spin Alternative Record Guide	5/10

Utopia Banished is the fourth studio album by the British grindcore band Napalm Death. It was released in 1992 by Earache Records. It is the first album featuring Danny Herrera on drums following the departure of Mick Harris. Metal Hammer ranked it as one of the 20 best metal albums of 1992.

== Release history ==
A limited edition of this album included a 3" bonus CD; the vinyl release included a bonus 7" containing the same material. The 2007 re-release came as part of Earache's Classic Metal series with The DVD as bonus disc. In 2012, Earache Records released a remastered edition on limited edition coloured vinyl and CD digipak.

The EP "The World Keeps Turning" was released in July 1992 on vinyl and CD and contains two non-album tracks, "A Means to an End" and "Insanity Excursion".

== Music ==
Jason Birchmeier of AllMusic characterized Utopia Banished as "stylistically veer[ing] somewhere between the grindcore noise assaults of their early, seminal albums" such as Scum and From Enslavement to Obliteration, and the "straightforward death metal" of releases such as Harmony Corruption. The album's instrumentation is said to be more precise and "more confident" than on Harmony Corruption, and the music has been noted for its increased experimentation. Some of the material has drawn comparisons to shoegaze music, such as the track "Contemptuous".

Napalm Death make use of samples in some songs on Utopia Banished. The tracks "Discordance" and "Awake (To a Life of Misery)" sample snippets from 1988 science fiction film They Live while the track "Contemptuous" takes a line from 1987 war film Full Metal Jacket.

== Critical reception ==
Jason Birchmeier of AllMusic gave the album two and a half stars out of five and said: "The album is a step in the right direction for the band after the straightforwardness of Harmony Corruption. Here they've found an interesting style to explore, a synthesis of their grindcore past and their death metal present that they'd soon refine on subsequent albums, to much success. Consider Utopia Banished, like Harmony Corruption before it, to be a passingly engaging transition toward the fruitful harvest that is Fear Emptiness Despair."

Invisible Oranges called the album "a superior version of Harmony Corruption—which is to say, what Harmony Corruption should've been."

In 2023, Stephen Hill of Metal Hammer said: "Utopia... is the best death metal album Napalm ever made. The sickening riffs mixed with that punk pace is unstoppable, it gave us the band's '90s high point."

== Track listing ==
No.	Title	Lyrics	Music	Length
1.	"Discordance"			1:26
2.	"I Abstain"	Mark Greenway	Jesse Pintado	3:30
3.	"Dementia Access"	Shane Embury	Mitch Harris	2:27
4.	"Christening of the Blind"	Embury	Embury	3:21
5.	"The World Keeps Turning"	Greenway	Pintado	2:55
6.	"Idiosyncratic"	Greenway	Embury, Pintado	2:35
7.	"Aryanisms"	Greenway	Embury, Harris	3:08
8.	"Cause and Effect (Part II)"	Greenway	Pintado	2:07
9.	"Judicial Slime"	Embury	Embury	2:36
10.	"Distorting the Medium"	Greenway	Pintado	1:58
11.	"Got Time to Kill"	Greenway	Embury	2:28
12.	"Upward and Uninterested"	Greenway	Pintado, Harris	2:07
13.	"Exile"	Embury	Harris	2:00
14.	"Awake (To a Life of Misery)"	Embury	Harris	2:05
15.	"Contemptuous"	Embury	Embury, Harris, Pintado	4:21
Total length:				39:04

== Personnel ==
=== Napalm Death ===
- Mark "Barney" Greenway – lead vocals
- Jesse Pintado – guitars
- Mitch Harris – guitars, backing vocals
- Shane Embury – bass
- Danny Herrera – drums

=== Technical personnel ===
- Colin Richardson – production, engineering
- Pete Coleman – co-engineering
- Matt Anker – photography
- Mid – cover art
- J. Barry – layout

== Chart positions ==
Chart (1992)	Peak position
German Albums (Offizielle Top 100)	60
Dutch Albums (Album Top 100)	77
UK Albums (Official Charts)	58
