= Syberia (album) =

Hamlet

Studio album by Hamlet
- Released: June 2005
- Studio: Cube Estudios (Madrid)
- Genre: Alternative metal, alternative rock
- Length: 54:13
- Label: Locomotive Music
- Producer: Hamlet and Alberto Seara

Hamlet chronology
Hamlet (2002)	Hamlet (2005)	Pura Vida (2006)

Syberia is the seventh album by the Spanish alternative metal band Hamlet. This album has a slower tempos and more melodic sound than their previous works, with some elements of pop-rock. Syberia was mixed by Sergio Marcos at Sonora Estudios in Madrid and mastered by George Marino in Sterling Sound (New York, USA). It is the first album with bassist Álvaro Tenorio.

== Track listing ==
1. Para Toda Una Vida
2. Aislados
3. Dame una señal
4. Imaginé
5. Serenarme (en la desolación)
6. Mi inmortalidad
7. Contraproducente
8. Desaparecer
9. Tiempo
10. En silencio
11. Inestimable
12. Resucitar

== Members ==
- J. Molly - Vocals
- Luis Tárraga - Lead guitar
- Pedro Sánchez - Rhythm guitar
- Álvaro Tenorio - Bass
- Paco Sánchez - Drums

== Sources ==
- Review in zona-zero
- info of the album
