= Venom (Bullet for My Valentine album) =

Studio album by Bullet for My Valentine
- Released: 14 August 2015
- Recorded: 2014–2015
- Studios: Metropolis Studios, London, England
- Genres: Melodic metalcore; thrash metal; heavy metal
- Length: 41:07
- Labels: Sony Music; RCA
- Producers: Colin Richardson; Carl Bown

Bullet for My Valentine chronology
Temper Temper (2013)	Venom (2015)	Gravity (2018)

Singles from Venom
- 1. "Raising Hell" Released: 18 November 2013; 2. "No Way Out" Released: 18 May 2015; 3. "You Want a Battle? (Here's a War)" Released: 29 June 2015; 4. "Army of Noise" Released: 17 July 2015; 5. "Venom" Released: 16 October 2015; 6. "Worthless" Released: 8 February 2016

Deluxe edition cover
- Artwork used for the deluxe edition cover

Venom is the fifth studio album by Welsh heavy metal band Bullet for My Valentine. The album was released on 14 August 2015 via RCA Records, their second and last album under the label as well as their final album under the Sony Music umbrella. It is the first album by the band since the departure of bassist Jason "Jay" James, which was announced in February 2015 while the band was recording the album. Jamie Mathias was announced as his replacement on 18 May 2015, along with the album's title, release date and release of the album's first single, "No Way Out". This would also be the final album with founding drummer Michael "Moose" Thomas who parted ways with the band officially in 2017.

"No Way Out" and "Broken" were premiered live during the band's headlining performance at the Camden Rocks Festival in London on 30 May 2015. The second and third singles, "You Want a Battle? (Here's a War)" and "Army of Noise", were released on 29 June and 17 July 2015, respectively. Another two songs, "Playing God" and "Worthless" were released respectively on 10 and 13 August 2015. The whole album was made available for streaming on YouTube on 14 August 2015.

Jamie Mathias is credited as a band member but did not perform on this album; Tuck recorded all bass guitar parts instead. Mathias later said in an interview that he hopes to be involved in future band projects.

== Reception ==
Professional ratings
Aggregate scores
Source	Rating
Metacritic	58/100
Review scores
Source	Rating
AllMusic	3.5/5 stars
DIY	2/5 stars
Exclaim!	3/10 stars
The Guardian	2/5 stars
Louder Sound	4/5 stars
NME	5/10 stars
Sputnikmusic	2/5 stars
Metal Hammer	8/10 stars
Kerrang!	4/5 stars
Evening Standard	3/5 stars

Although Venom received mixed reviews from music critics upon its release, fans have been more receptive to this album compared to the band's previous album, Temper Temper. At Metacritic, which assigns a rating out of 100 to reviews from mainstream critics, the album has an average score of 58/100 based on 8 reviews, indicating "mixed or average reviews", while the user's average score is 7.3/10.

British magazine Kerrang! awarded the album 4 stars, saying that "Venom has injected a whole new life into the British metal heroes." Alternative Press and AllMusic both gave the album 3.5 stars. However, a negative review came from Bradley Zorgdrager of Exclaim! who gave the album a 3 out of 10. The critic wrote that "the lack of quality choruses leaves something to be desired. While their heaviest output won't win over any elitists, fans will also have trouble finding something here to sing along to."

The album was included at number 37 on Rock Sound's top 50 releases of 2015 list.

== Track listing ==
All lyrics are written by Matt Tuck; all music is composed by Tuck, Michael Thomas and Michael Paget.

No.	Title	Length
1.	"V"	1:26
2.	"No Way Out"	3:53
3.	"Army of Noise"	4:18
4.	"Worthless"	3:18
5.	"You Want a Battle? (Here's a War)"	4:14
6.	"Broken"	3:39
7.	"Venom"	3:54
8.	"The Harder the Heart (The Harder It Breaks)"	4:00
9.	"Skin"	3:59
10.	"Hell or High Water"	4:36
11.	"Pariah"	3:46
Total length:		41:07

Deluxe edition bonus tracks
No.	Title	Length
12.	"Playing God"	3:52
13.	"Run for Your Life"	3:34
14.	"In Loving Memory"	4:02
15.	"Raising Hell"	4:35
16.	"Ace of Spades" (Motörhead cover)	2:35
Total length:		57:08

Japanese bonus tracks
No.	Title	Length
16.	"Live Medley: Hand Of Blood / Room 409 / Hearts Burst Into Fire / Begging For Mercy / Riot"	5:10
17.	"4 Words (To Choke Upon)" (Live)	3:57
18.	"Raising Hell" (Live)	4:38
Total length:		70:51

== Personnel ==
=== Bullet for My Valentine ===
- Matt Tuck - vocals, rhythm guitar, bass (uncredited)
- Michael "Moose" Thomas - drums, additional vocals on "You Want a Battle? (Here's a War)"
- Michael "Padge" Paget - lead guitar, additional vocals on "You Want a Battle? (Here's a War)"
- Jamie Mathias - bass (credited, but does not perform), backing vocals

=== Additional personnel ===
- Matt Tuck - production on "Raising Hell"
- Michael "Padge" Paget - production on "Ace of Spades"
- Jay James - bass and vocals on all Japan and Best Buy live bonus tracks
- Colin Richardson - production, mixing
- Carl Bown - production, mixing, additional vocals on "You Want a Battle? (Here's a War)"
- Jim Pinder - additional engineering
- Josh Gilbert - co-production on "The Harder the Heart (The Harder It Breaks)" and "Skin"
- Shane Blay - co-production on "The Harder the Heart (The Harder It Breaks)" and "Skin"
- Alex Robinson - assistant engineering, co-mixing, vocals recording on "Ace of Spades"
- Ted Jensen - mastering
- Dan Brown, Austin Dickinson, Ryan Richards, Stefan Whiting, Jack Vallier, Henry Boeree, Rebekah Power, Emma Gorman, Lauren Metccalf, Alice Williams, Andrew Humphries & Ginnie Breakwell - gang vocals on "You Want a Battle? (Here's a War)"
- Martyn "Ginge" Ford - production, mixing on "In Loving Memory (Demo Version)", engineering on "Raising Hell"

== Charts ==
=== Weekly charts ===
Weekly chart performance for Venom
Chart (2015)	Peak position
Australian Albums (ARIA)	1
Austrian Albums (Ö3 Austria)	2
Belgian Albums (Ultratop Flanders)	25
Belgian Albums (Ultratop Wallonia)	33
Canadian Albums (Billboard)	4
Czech Albums (ČNS IFPI)	25
Dutch Albums (Album Top 100)	24
Finnish Albums (Suomen virallinen lista)	4
French Albums (SNEP)	42
German Albums (Offizielle Top 100)	2
Irish Albums (IRMA)	26
Japanese Albums (Oricon)	34
New Zealand Albums (Recorded Music NZ)	8
Spanish Albums (Promusicae)	66
Swedish Albums (Sverigetopplistan)	46
Swiss Albums (Schweizer Hitparade)	1
Scottish Albums (Official Charts)	2
UK Albums (Official Charts)	3
UK Album Downloads (Official Charts)	4
UK Rock & Metal Albums (Official Charts)	1
US Billboard 200	8
US Top Rock Albums (Billboard)	2
US Top Hard Rock Albums (Billboard)	1

=== Year-end charts ===
Year-end chart performance for Venom
Chart (2015)	Position
US Top Hard Rock Albums (Billboard)	30

== Certifications ==
Certifications for Venom
Region	Certification	Certified units/sales
United Kingdom (BPI)	Silver	60,000^{‡}
^{‡} Sales+streaming figures based on certification alone.
