= Hamlet (album) =

Studio album by Hamlet
- Released: June 2002
- Recorded: 2001
- Studio: Sonic Ranch, Texas
- Genre: Nu metal, groove metal
- Length: 40:08
- Label: Locomotive Music
- Producer: Colin Richardson

Hamlet chronology
| El Inferno (2000) | Hamlet (2002) | Syberia (2005) |

Hamlet (also referred to as The Black Album) is the sixth album by Spanish metal band Hamlet. The sound of this CD is more aggressive than El Inferno album. This is the last studio album with bass player Augusto Hernández. It was produced and mixed by Colin Richardson and mastered by Tom Barket at Precision Mastering (Los Angeles).

== Track listing ==
- Limítate
- Queda Mucho Por Hacer
- Vivo En Él
- No Lo Entiendo
- El Disfraz
- Versus
- Mira Hacia Atrás
- Acuérdate De Mi
- Ni Un Solo Instante
- Esperaré En El Infierno
- Desorden

== Members ==
- J. Molly - vocals
- Luis Tárraga - lead guitar
- Pedro Sánchez - rhythm guitar
- Augusto Hernández - bass, chorus
- Paco Sánchez - drums

== Sources ==
- Info about the album
- Review on zona-zero
