= Mass Hysteria (band) =

French heavy metal band

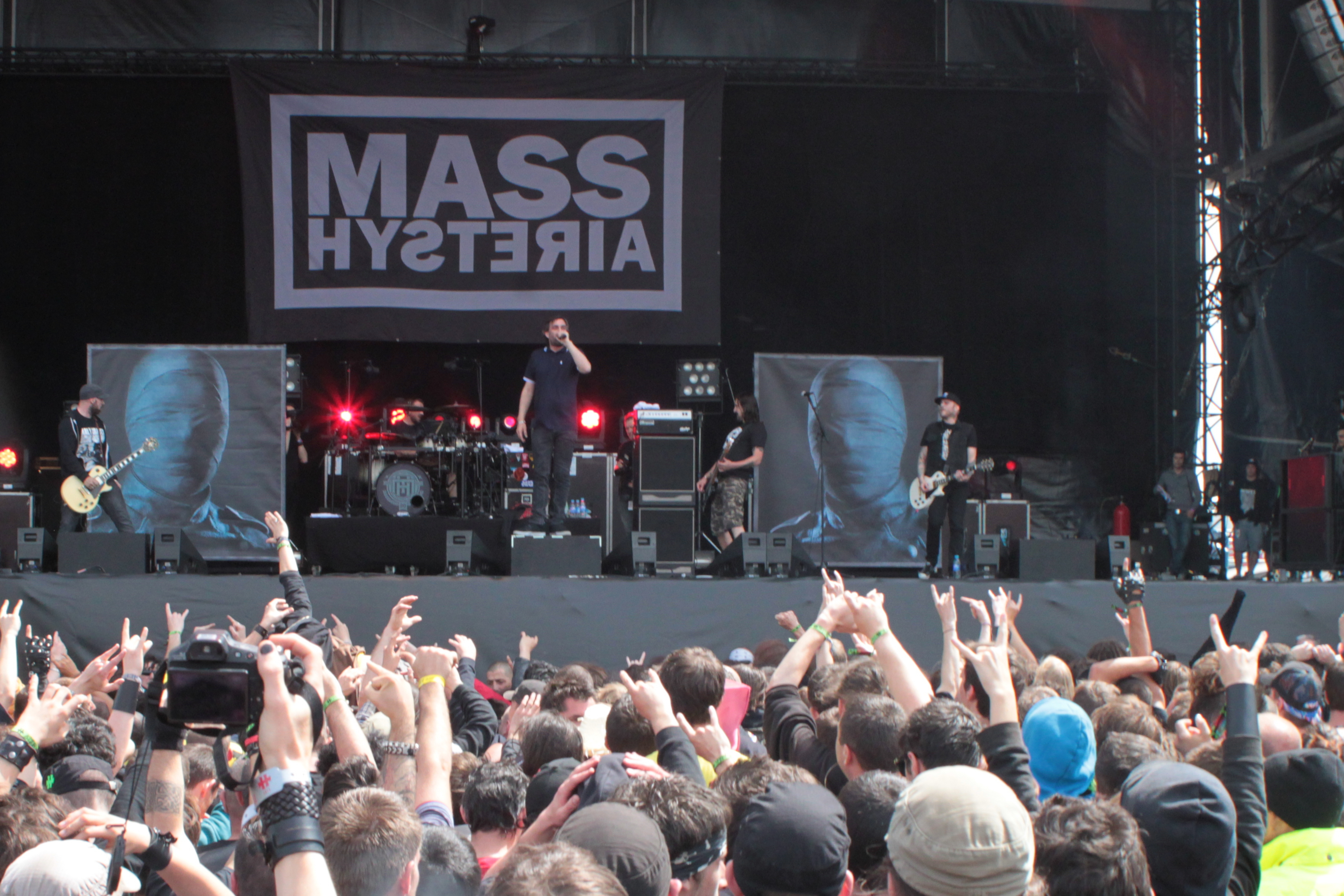
- Mass Hysteria performing live at Hellfest in 2013

Background information
- Origin: Paris, France
- Genres: Industrial metal, alternative metal, nu metal
- Years active: 1993–present
- Labels: Yelen (Sony), Wagram, At(h)ome
- Members: Mouss; Yann; Fred; Raphaël; Jamie
- Past members: Erwan; Overload System; Olivier Coursier; Stéphane; Nicolas; Vince; Atom

Mass Hysteria is a French metal band formed in Paris in 1993. The group is associated primarily with industrial and alternative metal and has also incorporated elements of nu metal, rap metal and rock. Its commercial breakthrough came with Contraddiction (1999), and its later releases include the two-part album Tenace (2023).

== The band ==
Mass Hysteria is known for their eclecticism, combining industrial metal, alternative metal, rock and rap (2001–2005).

=== Language ===
The band sings primarily in French which has made them an exception throughout the metal sphere.

== History ==
Created in 1993, the band recorded their first album, Le Bien-être et la Paix (Well-being and Peace), four years later. After this album, Mass Hysteria's breakthrough album came in 1999 with the release of Contraddiction which sold over 50,000 copies. The album itself is still widely regarded as the band's iconic 'Black album'. It was produced and mixed by Colin Richardson.

In 2001 the band returned after intensive touring with a different approach with the release of 'De Cercle en Cercle'. This album received mixed feelings with the arrival of new guitarist Olivier Coursier. The album's new pop/rap experiment approach left the band isolated from the metal scene. Michel Houellebecq, met in Québec, was supposed to write one of the songs but the agreement was never finalized. In 2005 the band released 'Mass Hysteria' confirming the band's new, softer pop/metal approach. Finally, in 2007 with the departure of Olivier and arrival of Nicolas Savoury the band returned with 'Une somme de détails' (an addition of details). The album pushed Mass Hysteria back to its root of origin that made it a success. This album was heavier than ever, and began to close-in on the level of success of 'Contraddiction'. Two years later, in late 2009, the band released 'Failles' (cracks). The album's cover undeniably confirmed the band's renewed connection with 'contraddiction' (also in red and black). The album received critical acclaim. Original bassist, Stéphan Jaquet departed the band in 2011. He would pass away in 2021 at the age of 53.

In the mass media, Mass Hysteria was known for some controversies and incidents surrounding them. But some critics have also noticed the quality of their music and their growing success.

- In 1998 the band played in Quebec, Montreal at the Spectrum. They recorded a live album there on 16 May. The concert hall was torn down in 2008.
- In 2001 the band played at the Pollywog in Montreal, Québec, Canada on 11 August 2001.
- In 2008 the band played at the Sziget Festival in Óbudai-Sziget, Budapest, Hungary on 16 August 2008.
- In 2008 the band played at the Club Soda in Montreal, Québec, Canada on 19 August 2008.
- In 2009 Metallica called on Mass Hysteria to open for their sold-out show at the 'Arènes de Nîmes'.
- In 2010 the band returned to Quebec to attend a special tour along with French metal band AqME.
- In 2010 the band played in Lörrach, Germany on 29 January.
- In 2011 the band released its anticipated first DVD live recorded and filmed in Toulouse (southern France).
- On 9 July 2011 the band participated at Sonisphere France along with the big four.
- In 2011 the band played 3 dates in New Caledonia (Pacific). On 15 & 22 November they appeared at Festival Rock in Dore (Village de Bohème). On 20 November the band played at 'Nouméa, Baie des Citrons' - Salle Le Bohème.

== Touring ==
In the last 25 years the band has played principally in France, Belgium and Switzerland. The 1998 Contradiction Tour resulted in over 300 concerts throughout France. In 2013, Mass Hysteria began La Tournée des ombres as part of the band's 20th anniversary and to promote their most recent album. The tour for their album " Matière Noire " was 120 shows going all over France, Switzerland, Belgium, Quebec and Russia.

== Background ==
The band's current line-up are from Brest, Rouen and Paris. Mouss is from the city of Brest, Brittany, France. Raphael and Yann are from Paris and Jamie is from Bray, County Wicklow, Ireland but grow up near Paris since his childhood .

== Members ==
=== Current members ===
- Mustapha "Mouss" Kelaï – vocals (1993–present)
- Raphaël Mercier – drums (1993–present)
- Yann Heurtaux – guitars (1995–present)
- Frédéric Duquesne – guitars (2014–present)
- Jamie Ryan – bass (2017–present)

=== Former members ===
- Stéphane Jaquet – bass (1993–2011; died 2021)
- Erwan Disez – guitars (1993–1999)
- Pascal Jeannet – samples (1995–1999)
- Olivier Coursier – guitars and samples (2000–2007)
- Nicolas Sarrouy – guitars (2007–2014)
- Vincent Mercier – bass (2012–2016)
- Atom Mass – bass (2016–2017)

== Discography ==
=== Studio albums ===
- Le Bien-être et la Paix (1997)
- Contraddiction (1999)
- De cercle en cercle (2001)
- Mass Hysteria (2005)
- Une somme de détails (2007)
- Failles (2009)
- L'Armée Des Ombres (2012)
- Matière Noire (2015)
- Maniac (2018)
- Tenace – Part 1 (2023)
- Tenace – Part 2 (2023)

=== Live ===
- 1998: Live à Montréal (live performance recorded in Montréal, Canada)
- 2011: Mass Hysteria: Live (live performance recorded in Toulouse, France)
- 2013: Mass Hysteria à l'Olympia (live performance recorded in Paris, France)
- 2016: Mass Hysteria: Le Trianon (live performance recorded in Paris, France)
