= La Puta y el Diablo =

Studio album by Hamlet
- Released: 2009
- Genre: Groove metal, alternative metal
- Length: 53:54
- Label: Roadrunner
- Producer: Alberto Seara and Hamlet

Hamlet chronology
Pura Vida (2006)	La Puta y el Diablo (2009)	Amnesia (2011)

La Puta y el Diablo is the ninth album by the Spanish alternative metal band Hamlet. The band introduced a groove metal oriented sound. Mixing and mastering was done by Logan Mader.

It is the first album with new guitarist Alberto Marín and their first with Roadrunner Records.

== Track listing ==
No.	Title	Length
1.	"El Hábil Reino del Desconcierto"	6:05
2.	"La Tentación"	4:56
3.	"El Traje del Muerto"	3:38
4.	"Siete Historias Diferentes"	5:06
5.	"En el Nombre de Dios"	5:58
6.	"No Habrá Final"	6:50
7.	"Escupe Tu Vanidad"	3:21
8.	"Si No Tú Quién"	5:22
9.	"Revolución"	4:39
10.	"Sacrificio"	7:59

== Members ==
- J. Molly - vocals
- Luis Tárraga - lead and rhythm guitar
- Alberto Marín - lead and rhythm guitar
- Álvaro Tenorio - bass
- Paco Sánchez - drums
