= Pura Vida (album) =

Hamlet

Studio album by Hamlet
- Released: 2006
- Genre: Alternative metal
- Length: 39:10
- Label: Locomotive Music
- Producer: Hamlet

Hamlet chronology
Syberia (2005)	Hamlet (2006)	La Puta y el Diablo (2009)

Pura Vida is the eighth album by the Spanish alternative metal band Hamlet. The sound is more aggressive than Syberia. It was recorded by Sergio Marcos and Sonia Robles in Sonora Estudios (Madrid, Spain); mixed by Colin Richardson in Miloco Studios (London, UK) and mastered by Alan Douches in West West Side Music (New York, USA). Is the last album with guitarist Pedro Sánchez.

== Track listing ==
1. Arruinando nuestra vida
2. El Diablo
3. En mi nombre
4. Bajo su cuerpo
5. Fronteras de tu mente
6. Salva mi honor
7. Acaba con el poder
8. Vanidad
9. Único plan
10. Miénteme

== Members ==
- J. Molly - Vocals
- Luis Tárraga - Lead guitar
- Pedro Sánchez - Rhythm guitar
- Álvaro Tenorio - Bass
- Paco Sánchez - Drums
