= Hamlet (band) =

Spanish metal band

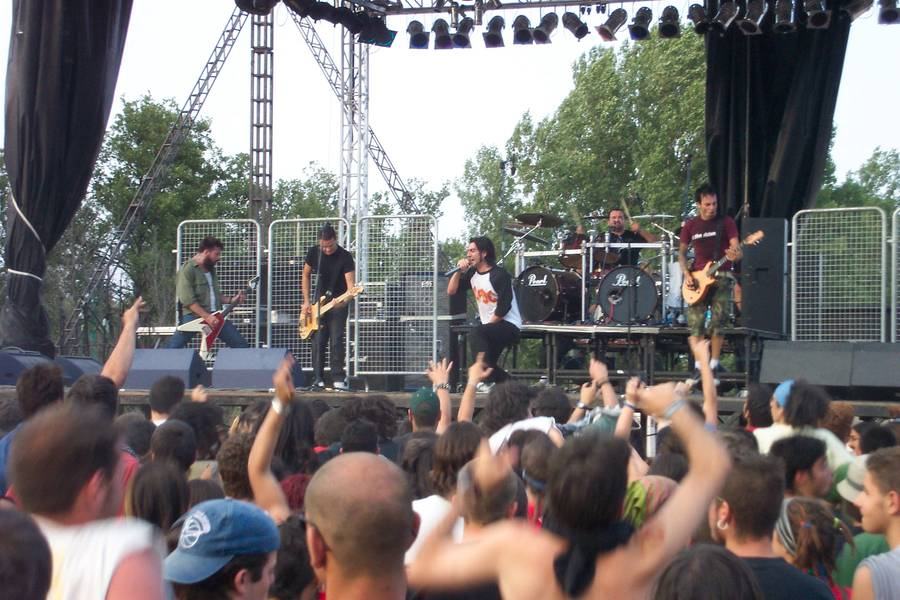
- Hamlet performing in 2003

Background information
- Origin: Madrid, Spain
- Genres: Groove metal, alternative metal, nu metal, hard rock (early)
- Years active: 1987–present
- Labels: Zero (1996–2000); Locomotive (2000–2008); Roadrunner (2008–2011); Kaiowas (2011–2014); Maldito (2015–present)
- Members: J. Molly; Luís Tárraga; Paco Sánchez; Alberto Marín; Álvaro Tenorio
- Past members: Javier Gómez; Javier Rocaverti; Pablo Gianni; Augusto Hernández; Pedro Sanchez
- Website: hamlet1.com

Hamlet is a Spanish five-piece metal band from Madrid, formed in 1987. They are signed to Maldito Records and have released twelve albums, their most recent being Inmortal in 2025. They are considered the pioneers of alternative metal in Spain with their albums Sanatorio de Muñecos (1994) and Revolución 12.111 (1996).

== History ==
Hamlet's history goes back to the late 1980s, when the five members decided to form a band using the name of one of the best-known works of writer William Shakespeare. After several concerts, they recorded a mini LP titled "Hamlet" with a style influenced by the era of hard rock. They continued to use the same style in the first official recording of the group, but with some changes (including formation). Peligroso was released in 1992 by DRO. The group was not very happy with the final work and this is the reason why the record is widely unknown.

=== 1993: Sanatorio de Muñecos ("The True Beginning") ===
More concerts and self-promotion lead J. Molly, Luis Tárraga, Pedro Sanchez, Paco Sanchez, and Augusto Hernandez to move to Tampa, Florida in 1993 to Morrisound Studios with producer and owner Tom Morris (Sepultura, Coroner, Morbid Angel) and record their second proper album Sanatorio de Muñecos. Without pressure, they were able to express all their musical influences (Sepultura, Pantera, Faith No More), and Hamlet formed their own sound. Their lyrics involve current topics and fans praise their musical evolution.

== Discography ==
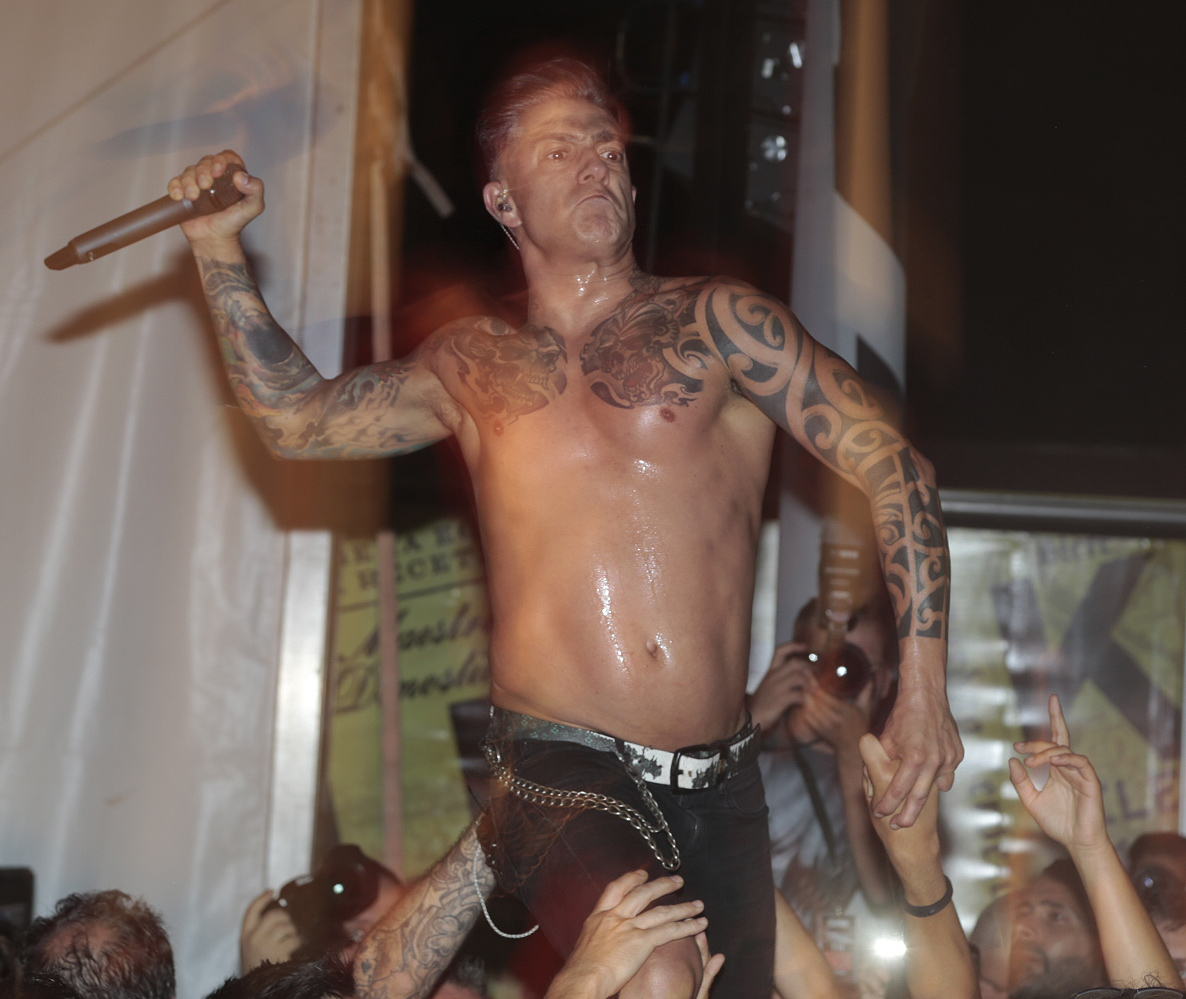
Vocalist J. Molly performing in 2016

=== Albums ===
Album name	Released	No. of tracks	Length
1. Peligroso	1992	12	32:28
2. Sanatorio de Muñecos	1994	13	49:07
3. Revolución 12.111	1996	15	59:47
4. Insomnio	1998	12	41:11
5. El Inferno	2000	11	40:05
6. Hamlet	2002	11	40:08
7. Syberia	2005	12	54:13
8. Pura Vida	2006	10	39:10
9. La Puta y el Diablo	2009	10	53:54
10. Amnesia	2011	11	45:25
11. La Ira	2015	13	50:36
12. Berlín	2018	11	41:45
13. Inmortal	2025	10	30:55

=== DVDs ===
DVD name	Released	No. of tracks
1. Directo	2003	24

=== Other song appearances ===
Track	Appearance	Year
"Out in the Cold"	Metal Gods, Tributo a Judas Priest	2000
"Más Azul"	Estirpe - Inventarse el mundo	2005
"Hombre"	Stravaganzza - Requiem	2007
"Maitasunaren Indarkeria"	Idi Bihotz - Zuzenean	2007
