= Untitled (Five Pointe O album) =

Studio album by Five Pointe O
- Released: March 19, 2002
- Recorded: 2001
- Studios: @ Sonic Ranch Studios, Tornillo, Texas, U.S.
- Genre: Nu metal
- Length: 52:39
- Label: Roadrunner
- Producer: Colin Richardson

Five Pointe O chronology
The Other Side (1999)	Untitled (2002)

Singles from Untitled
- 1. "Double X Minus" Released: September 1, 2002

Untitled is the only studio album by nu metal band Five Pointe O. The album was released on March 19, 2002 through Roadrunner Records.

== Background ==
The album's only single, "Double X Minus", received airplay on MTV2's Headbangers Ball and Kerrang! TV. "The Infinity" was featured on the Resident Evil soundtrack.

== Reception ==
Professional ratings
Review scores
Source	Rating
AllMusic	2/5 stars
Sputnikmusic	4.5/5 stars
Exclaim!	(Positive)

Exclaim! compared the album favorably to the early music of Linkin Park.

== Track listing ==
1. "Double X Minus" – 3:22
2. "King of the Hill" – 5:02
3. "Art of Cope" – 3:12
4. "Purity 01" – 4:12
5. "Freedom?" – 4:38
6. "Sympathetic Climate Control" – 5:16
7. "Untitled" – 3:51
8. "Syndrome Down" – 4:01
9. "Breathe Machine" – 2:46
10. "The Infinity" – 4:26
11. "Aspire, Inspire" – 11:47

== Personnel ==
Band

- Daniel Struble – vocals
- Eric Wood – guitar, backing vocals
- Sharon Grzelinski – guitar
- Sean Pavey – bass
- Tony Starcevich – drum
- Casey Mejia – keyboard, piano

Production

- Colin Richardson – production, mixing, engineering
- Justin Leeah – engineering
- Alan Douches – mastering
