= Fear, Emptiness, Despair =

Studio album by Napalm Death
- Released: 2 May 1994
- Recorded: October–December 1993
- Studios: Parr St. Studios, Liverpool, England; Jacob Studios, Surrey, England
- Genres: Death metal; groove metal
- Length: 38:53
- Labels: Earache; Columbia
- Producers: Pete Coleman; Napalm Death

Napalm Death chronology
Utopia Banished (1992)	Fear, Emptiness, Despair (1994)	Greed Killing (1995)

Singles from Fear, Emptiness, Despair
- 1. "Hung" Released: April 25, 1994

Fear, Emptiness, Despair is the fifth studio album by British grindcore band Napalm Death, released on 2 May 1994. Napalm Death's inclusion on the Mortal Kombat soundtrack brought significant exposure to the band and this album, alongside the fact that the band's label Earache had formed a partnership with Columbia Records which allowed the album to disseminate to a wider audience. RAW magazine listed Fear, Emptiness, Despair as one of the essential album of the 1990s.

In a 2017 interview, bassist Shane Embury listed the album as his least favourite of Napalm Death's discography, citing the division between the vocalist Barney Greenway and the remainder of the band, and the high corporate influence over the band during the album's production as factors that undermined the final result.

== Musical style ==
Originally titled Under Rule, the album represented a stylistic transition for Napalm Death. Fear, Emptiness, Despair maintained the complex music structures of their previous albums Utopia Banished and Harmony Corruption, but there was a greater emphasis placed on incorporating elements of groove into the band's style, resulting in a wider use of mid-paced music. The group experimented a new compositional style: they started off with the drum beats and then layered the guitar riffs atop of the drum patterns. Bassist Shane Embury claims that Helmet and their album Strap It On influenced the band's style on this album. Other alternative rock groups that shaped Napalm Death's music during this transitional period were Soundgarden, Jane's Addiction and Sonic Youth, plus old favorites such as Discharge and Death.

Jem Aswad and Ian Christe of Trouser Press, deeming Fear, Emptiness, Despair to be "Napalm Death's major-label experiment", comment that the album blends the group's English punk rock roots with "the progressive metal aggression" of the three American band members, with the group's dissonance becoming "a conscious effect, not a side benefit of chaos". AllMusic's Jason Birchmeier describes it as the culmination of the direction foreshadowed on Harmony Corruption (1990) and Utopia Banished (1992), namely "unrelenting grindcore as played by an experienced, technically advanced death metal collective with the guidance of a professional producer (Pete Coleman)".

== Reception ==
Professional ratings
Review scores
Source	Rating
AllMusic	4.5/5 stars
The Boston Phoenix	3/4 stars
Collector's Guide to Heavy Metal	8/10
The Encyclopedia of Popular Music	2/5 stars
Kerrang!	4/5 stars
Metal.de	9/10
Rock Hard	9/10
Spin Alternative Record Guide	6/10
Vox	5/10

In its first week of release Fear, Emptiness, Despair reached No. 22 in Billboard's Heatseekers chart. The inclusion of "Twist the Knife (Slowly)" in the Mortal Kombat soundtrack brought the band further acclaim. The soundtrack scored a Top 10 position on the Billboard 200 chart, and went platinum in less than a year. In 1995, RAW featured the album in its list of the 90 essential albums of the 1990s. In 2011, it was included in Kerrang!'s list of the "666 Albums You Must Hear Before You Die!".

In 2013, Andrew Earles of Spin ranked Fear, Emptiness, Despair at number 29 in their list of the "40 Weirdest Post-Nevermind Major Label Albums". He believed the "overlooked extreme-metal classic" was recorded at the "experimental highpoint" of the band, noting that it is famous for featuring no original band members. He continued that the album "was the band's grand gesture of cycling through riffs that remotely nodded to art-punks like Sonic Youth and Swans. But with Columbia's marketing muscle focused on Entombed, Napalm Death's only venture into major-label territory alienated long-time metalheads and failed to net new fans on the alterna-kid axis".

== Track listing ==
No.	Title	Lyrics	Music	Length
1.	"Twist the Knife (Slowly)"	Shane Embury	Mitch Harris	2:52
2.	"Hung"	Embury, Mark Greenway	Harris, Embury	3:49
3.	"Remain Nameless"	Embury	Jesse Pintado	3:33
4.	"Plague Rages"	Embury	Embury	3:51
5.	"More than Meets the Eye"	Greenway	Embury	3:55
6.	"Primed Time"	Greenway	Harris, Embury	3:28
7.	"State of Mind"	Embury	Embury	3:32
8.	"Armageddon X 7"	Greenway	Harris	3:16
9.	"Retching on the Dirt"	Greenway	Embury, Harris	2:59
10.	"Fasting on Deception"	Embury	Pintado	3:48
11.	"Throwaway"	Greenway	Pintado	3:42
Total length:				38:53

== Personnel ==
=== Napalm Death ===
- Mark "Barney" Greenway – vocals
- Jesse Pintado – guitar
- Mitch Harris – guitar
- Shane Embury – bass, random guitar noise
- Danny Herrera – drums

=== Production personnel ===
- Pete Coleman – production, engineering
- Colin Richardson – remixing
- Robin Grierson – photography
- Graham Humphreys – design

== Chart positions ==
Chart (1994)	Peak position
German Albums (Offizielle Top 100)	78
US Heatseekers Albums (Billboard)	22

== Bibliography ==
- Arnopp, Jason (23 April 1994). "Rekordz". Kerrang!. No. 491. EMAP. p. 44.
- Carioli, Carly (9 September 1994). "Off The Record". The Boston Phoenix (Arts). Vol. 23, no. 36. p. 40 – via Internet Archive.
- Russell, Graham (June 1994). "Reviews: Rock". Vox. No. 45. IPC. p. 92.
- Johnson, Howard, ed. (19 July 1995). "90 for the '90s: The Essential Albums". Raw. No. 180. EMAP. pp. 35–37, 44–47.
- Larkin, Colin, ed. (2007). "Napalm Death". Encyclopedia of Popular Music (5th concise ed.). Omnibus Press. pp. 1015–1016. ISBN 978-0857125958.
- Mudrian, Albert (2016). Choosing Death: The Improbable History of Death Metal & Grindcore (Revised and Expanded Edition) (3rd paperback ed.). US: Bazillion Points (published 2023). ISBN 978-1-935950-16-5.
- Norris, Chris (1995). "Napalm Death". In Weisbard, Eric; Marks, Craig (eds.). Spin Alternative Record Guide. Vintage Books. pp. 265–266. ISBN 0-679-75574-8.
- Popoff, Martin (2007). The Collector's Guide to Heavy Metal: Volume 3: The Nineties. Burlington, Ontario, Canada: Collector's Guide Publishing. ISBN 978-1-894959-62-9.
- Travers, Paul (November 2011). "Napalm Death: Also Recommended". Kerrang!: 666 Albums You Must Hear Before You Die!. Bauer Media Group. p. 79.
