= Contraddiction =

1999 studio album by Mass Hysteria

Studio album by Mass Hysteria
- Released: 2 February 1999
- Studio: Chapel Studios
- Genre: Industrial metal
- Length: 43:39
- Language: French
- Label: Yelen Music
- Producer: Colin Richardson

Mass Hysteria chronology
Live à Montréal (1998)	Contraddiction (1999)	De Cercle en Cercle (2001)

Contraddiction is the second studio album by French industrial metal band Mass Hysteria, released on 2 February 1999. It is considered to be the band's breakthrough album.

The album received widespread acclaim from critics, and is credited with pioneering French metal.

== Commercial performance ==
The album peaked at number 20 on the French SNEP's Top Albums chart.

50,000 copies of the album were sold as of 2018, thus it is certified gold by the French National Syndicate of Phonographic Publishing (SNEP).

== Track listing ==
No.	Title	Length
1.	"Contraddiction"	4:09
2.	"Zion"	4:30
3.	"Aimable à souhait"	4:15
4.	"Attracteurs étranges"	3:52
5.	"Finistère amer"	4:08
6.	"P4"	2:24
7.	"Sur la brèche"	4:06
8.	"Furia"	3:45
9.	"Le Dernier Tango"	3:58
10.	"Osmos '99"	3:12
11.	"Le Plus Juste Effet"	4:23
12.	"Carazones olvidados"	13:06
Total length:		43:39

== Personnel ==
- Mouss Kelai – vocals
- Yann Heurtaux – guitar
- Erwan Disez – guitar
- Stéphan Jaquet – bass
- Raphaël Mercier – drums
