= SugarComa =

English nu metal band

- SugarComa in 2001. From left to right: Claire Simson, Jessica Mayers, James Cuthbert and Heidi Fisk

Background information
- Origin: Romford, Essex, UK
- Genres: Nu metal, alternative metal
- Years active: 1999–2004; 2013
- Labels: Velocity Recordings, Music for Nations
- Members: Jessica Mayers; Claire Simson; Heidi Fisk (née McEwen); James Cuthbert
- Website: https://myspace.com/sugarcoma http://www.sugarcomaonline.com

Sugarcoma (commonly stylised in camel case as SugarComa) were a British nu metal band from Romford, who were active between 1999 and 2004. They were founded by vocalist and lyricist Jessica Mayers, bassist Heidi Fisk, drummer James Cuthbert and guitarist Claire Simson. SugarComa released one studio album, Becoming Something Else, in August 2002. They reunited for a one-off reunion show in October 2013.

== History ==
=== Early career ===
In March 1999 the band formed when vocalist Jess Mayers joined forces with guitarist Claire Simson, who had previously played in a band called Little Green Pants. Simson's childhood friend James Cuthbert joined as a drummer, while Heidi McEwen (later Fisk) became the bass player. The four members were all teenage pupils at St Edward's Church of England School and they recorded a demo tape using the school's facilities.

The band was named after a Hole song. (Note: An early incarnation of the "Boys on the Radio" track from Celebrity Skin had been titled "Sugar Coma". It was reported that Hole's Eric Erlandson wanted to call the Celebrity Skin album Sugar Coma, but was vetoed by Courtney Love who deemed it: "pedestrian". Love said: "It denotes the end of a cycle. Something deadly." She added, ominously: "If executives like it, you know it's bad.") They played their first gig at The Walthamstow Standard, supporting a Metallica tribute act.

=== Velocity Recordings ===
The band started sending their demo out and, as they did so in alphabetical order, the first record label to show interest was the first to receive the tape, Abuse Records. Reading-based club promoter and music executive Sid Siddle had started a zine called Abuse and then an eponymous record label. He later established a business relationship with Tony Defries' management company MainMan and changed the name of his label to Velocity Recordings. Defries had engaged Siddle's services to help find him a heavy metal girl band.

After attending the band's fourth performance at The Walthamstow Standard, Siddle agreed to fund and market their first single. With Iestyn Polson as producer, the band recorded an EP called Blisters which became Velocity Recordings' first ever release in August 2000.

Blisters was named Single of the Week in both Melody Maker and Kerrang! Melody Maker's guest reviewer Lauren Laverne was effusive in her praise: "This is fantastic. It starts off like Duran Duran, the chorus is totally Hole with a little Metallica thrown in."

As the band members were minors they were unable to sign a formal recording contract without parental consent. Their parents called in lawyers who advised against signing the Velocity Recordings/MainMan contract, aspects of which fell below the industry standard.

=== Music For Nations ===
A degree of marketing buzz surrounded the band as they continued to play small venues. They recorded a BBC Radio 1 Evening Session and were played on national radio by John Peel and Steve Lamacq. Samantha Fox attended one gig, while Metal Hammer's review of a November 2000 performance at the Pack Horse in Manchester described the scene:

"This tiny pub rammed to the rafters with more A&R men than you can shake a suitably large stick at... must be time for SugarComa then! After fighting their way through the veritable sea of industry types to get to the stage, the diminutive London-based foursome let rip with their awesome brand of post-grunge nu metal."

In December 2000 the band were announced as the support act for My Ruin on their 2001 UK concert tour. They impressed My Ruin's volatile singer Tairrie B and moved up the billing when original main support act Snake River Conspiracy pulled out. In early 2001 they secured their biggest gig so far, supporting Disturbed at the London Astoria alongside earthtone9. They then played a few dates with Guano Apes before returning to the studio to work on writing their debut album.

In spring 2001 they signed with the Music For Nations label and set to work on another EP, What Goes Around, with Colin Richardson, an experienced heavy metal producer. The rest of 2001 was predominantly taken up with writing and rehearsing new material for the forthcoming album. This was punctuated by a week-long holiday to Majorca, which inspired subsequent album tracks "Shots", "Last Orders" and "Lost Morning".

In April 2002 the band headlined a UK tour for the first time, supported by Music For Nations label mates InMe. They documented their progress in a Tour Diary feature written for Metal Hammer magazine.

Although the band enjoyed supporting the established metal bands they admired, they sometimes faced hostility from audiences whose fierce loyalty was to the headline acts. In April 2002 Cuthbert said: "One Minute Silence wasn't so bad, but with bands like Fear Factory and Machine Head who have had the same fans for years they just don't give you a chance."

The band were unhappy when label executives interfered with their creative process, rejecting some songs outright and seeking to impose a more "commercial" sound on others. The band also expressed irritation at the label's promotional efforts on their behalf, which included being sent to appear on BBC children's television programme "The Saturday Show". Fisk lamented: "We felt a bit uncool as the musicians we looked up to and aspired to be like were not the types to be found on Saturday morning TV."

"The music industry is a brutal place, especially for the young and female. We were patronised and told we knew nothing about our fans, we were told to focus on our appearance and weight, and we didn't know any better."

— SugarComa in 2013 on the band's relationship with their former record label

To tie in with their April 2002 UK tour, the band released a double A-side "(You Drive Me) Crazy/Windings". The Britney Spears cover version was conceived as a joke during early rehearsal sessions and had been successfully deployed as an encore when the band lacked enough material of their own. Although by the time of its release Simson admitted to some ambivalence: "We just wanted to get it out of the way because we knew we would have to release it at some point."

The "(You Drive Me) Crazy" cover was not universally derided – The Manchester Evening News called it a "top rock version" – but it cost the band credibility within the heavy metal subculture and alienated their core audience. An angry and disparaging review on Drowned in Sound awarded one star out of ten. Kerrang! bestowed another Five 'K' review and Single of the Week, but guest reviewer Mat Hoffman's rationale was sardonic: "Do I like Britney? No. I just like the fact they're ripping apart her music. They get a five, just for going there."

The release dates of the first album Becoming Something Else and accompanying single "Zero Star" were delayed several times, due to what was reported as "unforeseen problems with the album's artwork". In the meantime, another headline tour was scheduled for June 2002. The album had been completed by January 2002 but was not released until 5 August 2002 in Europe and 27 August 2002 in the United States.

In September 2002 the band was announced as the support act for SOiL and The Wildhearts on their respective UK tours. Ginger Wildheart expressed interest in producing SugarComa's next album.

In May 2003 it was reported that the band had recorded a batch of demos for their second album, which was three quarters complete and provisionally scheduled for release on Music For Nations in early 2004. By March 2004 they had recorded some more demos but had been released from Music For Nations (which folded that year due to changes at its parent company Sony Music) and were looking for another record deal.

Fisk reported that the band "fizzled out" during 2004 because they all wanted more secure employment, but that they had never formally split up.

=== Later activities ===
When The End Records label obtained the rights to rerelease 50 titles from then-defunct Music For Nations' back catalogue in December 2011, Becoming Something Else was included in the deal. In February 2015 Music For Nations reformed and made several of its titles including Becoming Something Else available digitally for the first time.

Although the band had declined to sign with Velocity Recordings in 2000, they were bemused when the label continued to release their early material without their knowledge or consent. They disavowed Never Born (2001) and Life Before Colin (2011) as "unsanctioned bunches of old demos which purport to be official albums". Fisk said both recordings consist of the same tracks, namely: "incomplete demos with car alarm noises dubbed over them".

In July 2013 a band statement carried by Rock Sound announced one-off reunion concert at The Garage, London in October 2013. Hearts Under Fire were later named as the support act. The statement explained that the band regretted the manner of their sudden departure from their record company. They wanted to play a final gig to gain closure and go out on their own terms.

Due to "phenomenal demand", the reunion show was switched from The Garage to The Jazz Café in Camden Town. Gasoline Thrill were added to the bill and the concert went ahead on 26 October 2013. As Cuthbert was unable to participate in the reunion he was replaced on drums by a friend of the band, Iain "Slomo" Scott.

In April 2015 Mayers was running a human resources department, Simson was a digital project manager working in mobile app development and Fisk was a train driver on the London Underground. Cuthbert had lost contact with the rest of the band.

== Musical style and influences ==
Media coverage of SugarComa tended to categorise them within the nu metal subgenre. Their artist page at Velocity Recordings carried a short biography branding them: "A feisty nu-metal foursome from London". They were also frequently bracketed alongside Kittie, a contemporary Canadian female-fronted metal band. The band disliked both the nu metal label and constantly being likened to Kittie.

A November 2000 article in Total Guitar noted the band's rejection of Kittie comparisons and instead declared Sepultura and Babes in Toyland to be primary influences. The article also carried quotes from Simson, which expressed the band's preference for the label "alternative metal" over "nu metal".

Explicitly refuting their nu metal credentials in a January 2001 interview with Drowned in Sound, Fisk and Cuthbert argued that they used drop D tuning only sparingly, lacked a DJ and had no connection to American godfather of nu metal, Fred Durst. Cuthbert added: "We get loads of riot grrrl types at our gigs even though we're not really that kind of music [either]".

In a review of an early gig at The Water Rats, NME magazine likened Mayers to Saffron from Republica and praised her as a: "truly mercurial frontwoman". Mayers typically combined screaming with clean vocals. She was also the bands' lyricist and tended to base her words on her preoccupations as a teenage girl. Stressing the band's authenticity, Mayers told Drowned in Sound: "When I sing my words I mean and feel them. Our songs are not fake angry shit!"

Despite their objections, the band's long term legacy was to be situated within the long tail of nu metal.

== Members ==
Final members

- Jessica Mayers – lead vocals (1999–2004, 2013)
- Claire Simson – guitar (1999–2004, 2013)
- Heidi Fisk (née McEwen) – bass (1999–2004, 2013)
- Iain "Slomo" Scott – drums (2013)

Former members

- James Cuthbert – drums (1999–2004)

== Discography ==
=== Studio albums ===
- Becoming Something Else (2002)

=== Unsanctioned albums ===
- Never Born (2001)
- Life Before Colin (2011)

=== Extended plays ===
- Blisters (2000)
- What Goes Around (2001)

=== Singles ===
- "(You Drive Me) Crazy/Windings" (2002) (UK No. 57)
- "Zero Star" (2002) (UK No. 83)
