= Becoming Something Else =

Studio album by SugarComa
- Released: 5 August 2002
- Recorded: 2001
- Venue: Chapel Studios, Lincolnshire
- Genre: Nu metal; alternative metal
- Length: 45:56
- Label: Music For Nations, Koch
- Producer: Colin Richardson

Singles from Becoming Something Else
- 1. "(You Drive Me) Crazy" / "Windings" Released: 1 April 2002; 2. "Zero Star" Released: 22 July 2002

Alternate cover
- US-only album cover

Professional ratings
Review scores
Source	Rating
AllMusic	3/5 stars
GAFFA	1/6 stars
TrueMetal	2/5 stars
Silent Uproar	3.8/5

Becoming Something Else is the only studio album by British nu metal band SugarComa. The album was released on 5 August 2002 by Music For Nations.

== Track listing ==
No.	Title	Length
1.	"Windings"	3:55
2.	"Come Up"	4:04
3.	"Last Orders"	4:06
4.	"Shots"	3:45
5.	"Stitch It Up"	3:47
6.	"Just Like You"	4:17
7.	"Because September Ended"	3:30
8.	"Lost Morning"	3:57
9.	"What Goes Around"	3:29
10.	"Gun"	3:33
11.	"Start Of The End"	2:29
12.	"(You Drive Me) Crazy"	2:28
13.	"Zero Star"	3:14
Total length:		45:56

United States Enhanced CD version
No.	Title	Length
14.	"Zero Star (video)"	3:14

Japanese version
No.	Title	Length
14.	"Stained (bonus track)"

== Personnel ==
SugarComa

- Jessica Mayers – vocals
- Claire Simson – guitars
- Heidi McEwan – bass guitar
- James Cuthbert – drums

Additional personnel

- Colin Richardson – production, engineering
- Ewan Davies – engineering
- Ray Staff – mastering
