= Diatribes (album) =

Studio album by Napalm Death
- Released: January 26, 1996
- Recorded: Framework Studios
- Genres: Death metal; groove metal
- Length: 44:16
- Label: Earache
- Producer: Colin Richardson

Napalm Death chronology
Greed Killing (1995)	Diatribes (1996)	In Tongues We Speak (1997)

Professional ratings
Review scores
Source	Rating
AllMusic	3.5/5 stars
Collector's Guide to Heavy Metal	8/10
The Encyclopedia of Popular Music	2/5 stars
Kerrang!	4/5 stars
MetalReviews	58/100

Diatribes is the sixth studio album by English grindcore band Napalm Death, released in January 1996 on Earache Records. It was released as double 10" vinyl, regular CD, special digipak CD with space for the Greed Killing EP and MC. In 2010, Earache issued a re-release of Diatribes in a box set that also included the Greed Killing EP and the live album Bootlegged in Japan.

== Track listing ==
No.	Title	Lyrics	Music	Length
1.	"Greed Killing"	Shane Embury; Mitch Harris	Harris	3:06
2.	"Glimpse into Genocide"	Embury	Jesse Pintado	3:02
3.	"Ripe for the Breaking"	Mark Greenway	Harris; Embury	4:01
4.	"Cursed to Crawl"	Embury	Embury	3:26
5.	"Cold Forgiveness"	Embury	Harris; Pintado	4:32
6.	"My Own Worst Enemy"	Embury	Embury	3:36
7.	"Just Rewards"	Greenway	Harris	3:29
8.	"Dogma"	Embury	Embury	3:30
9.	"Take the Strain"	Greenway	Embury	4:11
10.	"Diatribes"	Greenway	Embury; Harris	3:52
11.	"Placate, Sedate, Eradicate"	Greenway	Pintado	3:24
12.	"Corrosive Elements"	Greenway	Embury; Harris	4:02

== Personnel ==
=== Napalm Death ===
- Mark "Barney" Greenway – lead vocals
- Jesse Pintado – guitar
- Mitch Harris – guitar
- Shane Embury – bass, backing vocals
- Danny Herrera – drums

=== Technical personnel ===
- Colin Richardson – production
- Danny Sprigg – engineering
- Paul Siddens – assistant engineering
- Emma Siddens – assistant engineering
- Noel Summerville – mastering

== Chart positions ==
Chart (1996)	Peak position
Finnish Albums (Suomen virallinen lista)	38
German Albums (Offizielle Top 100)	94
UK Albums (Official Charts)	73
UK Rock & Metal Albums (Official Charts)	5
