= Greed Killing =

EP by Napalm Death
- Released: 21 November 1995
- Genres: Deathgrind; groove metal
- Length: 23:40
- Label: Earache
- Producer: Colin Richardson

Napalm Death chronology
Fear, Emptiness, Despair (1994)	Greed Killing (1995)	Diatribes (1996)

Professional ratings
Review scores
Source	Rating
Allmusic	3/5 stars
Chronicles of Chaos	8/10
Collector's Guide to Heavy Metal	6/10

Greed Killing is an EP by the British band Napalm Death.

It was released in 1995 on Earache Records, containing two songs from the Diatribes album and four exclusive songs from the Diatribes recording sessions.

== Track listing ==
No.	Title	Lyrics	Music	Length
1.	"Greed Killing"	Shane Embury, Mitch Harris	Harris	3:06
2.	"My Own Worst Enemy"	Embury	Embury	3:36
3.	"Self Betrayal"	Embury	Embury	4:38
4.	"Finer Truths, White Lies"	Embury	Harris	3:00
5.	"Antibody"	Mark Greenway	Embury	2:51
6.	"All Links Severed"	Greenway	Jesse Pintado	2:41
7.	"Plague Rages" (Live)	Embury	Embury	3:48

== Credits ==
- Mark "Barney" Greenway – vocals
- Jesse Pintado – lead guitar
- Mitch Harris – rhythm guitar
- Shane Embury – bass
- Danny Herrera – drums
