= Pulkas =

British metal band

- Also known as: I:AM:I
- Origin: London, England
- Genres: Nu metal
- Years active: 1995–2002
- Label: Earache
- Members: Luke Lloyd; Martin Bourne; Jules McBride
- Past members: Rob Lewis

Pulkas was an English nu metal band from London, United Kingdom which later changed its name to I:AM:I.

== History ==
=== Formative years and signing to Earache ===
Pulkas were formed in 1995 by Luke Lloyd (vocals), Martin Bourne (guitar)m Jules McBride (bass) and Rob Lewis (drums) after having met on the London Underground.

The band released a demo tape containing the songs Control and This Is It, which would later appear on their debut album Greed. This demo caught the attention of record label Earache Records, to which the band were signed after less than ten performances.

=== Greed, contractual troubles and disbandment ===
The album Greed, produced by renowned British record producer Colin Richardson, was released in early 1998. Pulkas would later tour with the bands Dub War, Janus Stark and Misery Loves Co. later in 1998 as part of the Earache NextGen tour.

After the release of Greed, Pulkas decided that they would prefer to be under a larger record label. However, this went in violation of the contract signed with Earache, which had the band promising the label at least three more studio albums. The band proceeded to break contact with Earache, resulting in legal proceedings from the label.

The band changed their name to "I:AM:I" in October 2002 due to what they described as "boring tedious music business bullshit", hired a new drummer, and announced a tour with the bands Zero Cipher, Aconite Thrill, The Goose and Mumcuss. The band broke apart shortly after.

=== Legacy ===
Fellow English band earthtone9 have cited Pulkas as a major influence, comparing them to Killing Joke.

== Discography ==
=== Studio albums ===
- Greed (1998)

=== Singles ===
- Control

== Members ==
- Luke Lloyd – vocals (1995-2002)
- Martin Bourne – guitar (1995-2002)
- Jules McBride – bass (1995-2002)
- Unnamed drummer (2002)

=== Past members ===
- Rob Lewis – drums (1995-2002)
