= Still Woman Enough =

Book by Loretta Lynn

- Author: Lynn and Patsi Bale Cox
- Subject: Loretta Lynn
- Publication date: 2002
- ISBN: 9780786866502
- Preceded by: Coal Miner's Daughter
- Followed by: Honky Tonk Girl: My Life in Lyrics

Still Woman Enough is a 2002 autobiography of American country music singer Loretta Lynn, written by Lynn and Patsi Bale Cox. The book discusses, in-depth, Lynn's life, from her early days in Butcher Hollow, Kentucky, as the daughter of a coal miner, her marriage to Oliver "Doolittle" Lynn, her musical career, and personal triumphs and trials in Lynn's life up to the time the book was written.
