= Live Corruption =

Live album by Napalm Death
- Released: 1 July 1991
- Recorded: 30 June 1990 at the Salisbury Arts Centre
- Genre: Death metal; deathgrind; grindcore
- Length: 53:16
- Label: Earache
- Producer: Steve Mallet; Dir: Steve Payne

Napalm Death chronology
Harmony Corruption (1990)	Live Corruption (1991)	Mass Appeal Madness (1991)

Professional ratings
Review scores
Source	Rating
AllMusic	2/5 stars
The Encyclopedia of Popular Music	1/5 stars

Live Corruption is a live album by the English band Napalm Death released in 1992. It was recorded live at the Salisbury Arts Centre, England on 30 June 1990. The band performed various songs composed by the original line-up.

== Track listing ==
No.	Title	Length
1.	"Intro"	4:33
2.	"Unchallenged Hate"	2:15
3.	"Life?"	1:13
4.	"The Kill"	0:46
5.	"Scum"	3:02
6.	"If The Truth Be Known"	4:37
7.	"Lucid Fairytale"	1:31
8.	"Control"	1:54
9.	"Walls of Confinement"	3:11
10.	"Malicious Intent"	3:56
11.	"Social Sterility"	1:24
12.	"Suffer The Children"	4:17
13.	"From Enslavement To Obliteration"	1:57
14.	"Dead / Practice What You Preach"	2:26
15.	"Mentally Murdered"	2:41
16.	"Extremity Retained"	4:52
17.	"Mind Snare"	4:04
18.	"Success?"	1:46
19.	"Rise Above"	2:51

== Credits ==
- Mark "Barney" Greenway – vocals
- Jesse Pintado – guitar
- Mitch Harris – guitar
- Shane Embury – bass
- Mick Harris – drums

Video Dir: Steve Payne – a.k.a. Paynie Video Producer: Steve Mallet
