= Loretta Lynn: Coal Miner's Daughter =

Book by Loretta Lynn and George Vecsey

- Author: Loretta Lynn; George Vecsey
- Subject: Loretta Lynn
- Publication date: 1976
- ISBN: 9780809281220
- OCLC: 1973927
- Followed by: Still Woman Enough

Loretta Lynn: Coal Miner's Daughter is a 1976 memoir of American country music singer Loretta Lynn, written by Lynn as told to George Vecsey.

== Background ==
The book was conceived by Lynn's management and publisher Bernard Geis, who contacted Vecsey. Vecsey had been sent to report on Appalachia by his employer, the New York Times, when he was assigned a story about the Hurricane Creek mine disaster in 1970 near Hyden, Kentucky. The reporter was "deeply moved" when Lynn dropped previous commitments to perform a benefit concert in Louisville for women and children survivors of the men killed in the mine explosion, and agreed to help "put the real Loretta on paper".

Vecsey related to Times books columnist Ray Walters in 1977 that each week as he was writing the book he flew to where Lynn was performing and recorded interviews with her in hotel rooms or on her tour bus. The writer used a tape recorder to capture her speech patterns and to help him relate her "voluble but unlettered" manner of speaking.

== Publication and sales ==
The book was published by conservative Chicago publisher Henry Regnery Company. It was well received, spending 8 weeks on the hardcover bestsellers list, and selling 140,000 hardcover copies with 757,000 paperbacks in print as of Walter's 1977 review. In 1980, the book's stories were recreated on film as Coal Miner's Daughter, which garnered the Best Motion Picture – Musical or Comedy award at the 38th Golden Globe Awards.
