= Five Pointe O =

American heavy metal band

- Origin: Joliet, Illinois, United States
- Genres: Nu metal
- Years active: 1999–2003
- Label: Roadrunner Records
- Past members: Daniel Struble; Eric Wood; Sharon Grzelinski; Sean Pavey; Tony Starcevich; Casey Mejia

Five Pointe O (pronounced "5 point O") was a nu metal band from Joliet, Illinois.

== History ==
Five Pointe 0 was formed in 1999 by vocalist Daniel Struble, guitarist Sharon Grzelinski and bassist Sean Pavey. They then recruited Eric Wood on guitar, Tony Starcevich on drums and Casey Mejia on keyboards. The band self-released two EPs in 1999, Five Pointe 0 and The Other Side.

In 2001, they signed with Roadrunner Records and released their debut album Untitled on March 19, 2002. After almost a full year of touring, vocalist Daniel Struble and guitarist Sharon Grzelinski parted ways with the band. Despite the remaining members vowing to continue on, the band later disbanded.

The song "The Infinity" was featured in the film, Resident Evil.

== Members ==
- Daniel Struble – vocals
- Eric Wood – guitar
- Sharon Grzelinski – guitar
- Jon Bartlett – guitar
- Sean Pavey – bass
- Tony Starcevich – drum
- Casey Mejia – keyboards

== Discography ==
Studio albums
Untitled
- Released: March 19, 2002 (U.S.)
- Label: Roadrunner
- Singles: Double X Minus

EPs
Five Pointe O
- Released: 1999 (U.S.)
- Label: Self-released
1. King Of The Hill*
2. GP2
3. Waiting To Fall
4. Awake
The Other Side
- Released: 1999 (U.S.)
- Label: Self-released
1. Introduction
2. Purity 01*
3. Feelin It
4. Christ
