= Coal Miner's Daughter (film) =

1980 film by Michael Apted

- Theatrical release poster
- Directed by: Michael Apted
- Screenplay by: Tom Rickman
- Based on: Coal Miner's Daughter (1976 book) by Loretta Lynn; George Vecsey
- Produced by: Bernard Schwartz
- Starring: Sissy Spacek; Tommy Lee Jones; Beverly D'Angelo; Levon Helm
- Cinematography: Ralf D. Bode
- Edited by: Arthur Schmidt
- Music by: Owen Bradley
- Distributed by: Universal Pictures
- Release date: March 7, 1980
- Running time: 124 minutes
- Country: United States
- Language: English
- Budget: $15 million (equivalent to $49.1 million in 2025)
- Box office: $67.18 million (equivalent to $220 million in 2025)

Coal Miner's Daughter is a 1980 American biographical musical film directed by Michael Apted and written by Tom Rickman. It follows the story of country music singer Loretta Lynn from her early teen years in a poor family and getting married at 15 to her rise as one of the most influential country musicians. Based on Lynn's 1976 biography of the same name, co-authored with George Vecsey, the film stars Sissy Spacek as Lynn. Tommy Lee Jones, Beverly D'Angelo and Levon Helm are featured in supporting roles. Country musicians Ernest Tubb, Roy Acuff, and Minnie Pearl make cameo appearances as themselves.

A film on Lynn's life was intended to be made since the release of the biography. Production for the film began in March 1979, and Lynn herself chose Spacek to portray her on screen after seeing a photograph of her, despite being unfamiliar with her films. The film's soundtrack featured all of Lynn's hit singles, which were all sung by Spacek, as well as Patsy Cline's "Sweet Dreams" sung by D'Angelo and Cline's "Back in Baby's Arms" sung by Spacek and D'Angelo in a duet. The soundtrack reached the top 40 on the Billboard 200 chart and was certified gold by the Recording Industry Association of America.

Universal Pictures released Coal Miner's Daughter theatrically on March 7, 1980. The critical consensus on Rotten Tomatoes calls it "a solidly affecting story". The film grossed $67.18 million in North America against a budget of $15 million, becoming the seventh highest-grossing film of 1980. The film received seven nominations at the 53rd Academy Awards, including for Best Picture, with Spacek winning Best Actress. At the 38th Golden Globe Awards, it garnered four nominations and won two; Best Motion Picture – Musical or Comedy and Best Actress (for Spacek).

The film is considered "culturally, historically or aesthetically significant" by the Library of Congress and was selected to be preserved in the United States National Film Registry in 2019.

== Plot ==
In 1945, 13-year-old Loretta Webb is one of eight children of Ted Webb, a Van Lear coal miner raising a family with his wife in the midst of grinding poverty in Butcher Hollow, Kentucky (pronounced by locals as "Butcher Holler").

In 1948, at the age of 15, Loretta marries 21-year-old Oliver "Mooney" Lynn (aka Doo, short for Doolittle), becoming a mother of four by the time she is 19. The family moves to northern Washington State, where Doo works in the forest industry and Loretta sings occasionally at local honky-tonks on weekends. After some time, Loretta makes an occasional appearance on local radio.

By the time Loretta turns 25, Norm Burley, the owner of Zero Records, a small Canadian record label, hears Loretta sing during one of her early radio appearances. Burley gives the couple the money needed to travel to Los Angeles to cut a demo tape from which her first single, "I'm a Honky Tonk Girl", is made. After returning home from the sessions, Doo suggests he and Loretta go on a promotional tour to push the record. Doo shoots his own publicity photo for Loretta, and spends many late nights writing letters to show promoters and to radio disc jockeys all over the South. After Loretta receives an emergency phone call from her mother telling her that her father had died, she and Doo hit the road with records, photos, and their children. The two embark on an extensive promotional tour of radio stations across the South.

En route, and unbeknownst to the couple, "I'm a Honky Tonk Girl" hits the charts based on radio and jukebox plays and earns her a spot on the Grand Ole Opry. In the summer of 1961, after 17 straight weekly performances on the Opry, she is invited to sing at Ernest Tubb Record Shop's Midnite Jamboree after her performance that night. Country superstar Patsy Cline, one of Loretta's idols, who had recently been hospitalized from a near-fatal car wreck, inspires Loretta to dedicate Patsy's newest hit "I Fall to Pieces" to the singer herself as a musical get-well card. Cline listens to the broadcast that night from her hospital room and sends her husband Charlie Dick to Ernest Tubb Record Shop to fetch Loretta so the two can meet. A close friendship with Cline follows, which is abruptly ended by Cline's death in a plane crash on March 5, 1963.

The next few years are a whirlwind. The stress of extensive touring, keeping up her image, overwork, and trying to keep her marriage and family together cause Loretta a nervous breakdown, which she suffers onstage at the beginning of a concert. After a year off at her ranch in Hurricane Mills, Tennessee, Loretta goes back on the road, returning to establish herself as the "First Lady of Country Music".

The film closes with Loretta recounting the story of her life through her 1970 hit song "Coal Miner's Daughter" to a sold-out audience.

== Cast ==
- Sissy Spacek as Loretta Lynn
- Tommy Lee Jones as Doolittle Lynn
- Beverly D'Angelo as Patsy Cline
- Levon Helm as Ted Webb
- William Sanderson as Lee Dollarhide
- Phyllis Boyens as Clara Ramey Webb, Loretta's mother
- Bob Hannah as Charlie Dick
- Grant Turner as Grand Ole Opry announcer (uncredited)
- Ernest Tubb as himself
- Roy Acuff as himself
- Minnie Pearl as herself
- Bob Elkins as Bobby Day

== Production ==
Lynn chose Spacek to portray her, making the decision based on a photograph of the actress despite being unfamiliar with her films, a story Spacek recounts in a DVD audio commentary for the collector's edition of the film. Initially, Spacek was reluctant to participate, and asked to do her own singing in the film in hopes of scaring the studio from pursuing her for the role. At the time that Lynn prematurely announced on The Tonight Show Starring Johnny Carson that "Sissy Spacek is going to play me," the actress was torn between friends who advised her to do Lynn's film and those who advised her to choose instead a Nicolas Roeg project due to start filming at the same time. Talking it over with her mother-in-law that evening, Spacek was advised to pray for a sign, which she did. She and her husband subsequently went for a drive in his mother's car, where the radio was tuned to a classical music station that changed formats at sunset every evening. As the couple pulled out of the parking garage, the title line of the song "Coal Miner's Daughter" came from the radio.

In her 2012 memoir My Extraordinary Ordinary Life, Sissy Spacek states that she became fast friends with Loretta Lynn and worked to emulate her unique accent and speech patterns by spending an afternoon tape-recording the singer while she told stories of her life, some of which made it into the script. She then listened to the tapes and repeated the lines until she captured her own version of Lynn. Though Spacek had started out as a singer, the producers considered dubbing Loretta's vocals over her performance. Lynn encouraged them to allow Spacek to do all of her own singing in the film and helped the actress learn to sing and play guitar in her style. The film's soundtrack featured Spacek's singing all of Lynn's hits sung in the movie, including "Coal Miner's Daughter".

The locations included Blackey, Eolia, Flatgap, Bottom Fork, Redfox in Knott and Letcher Counties in Kentucky; and Pardee, a former coal camp on the Virginia side of Black Mountain. Interiors of Lynn's childhood home were shot in a warehouse in Norton, Virginia. Scenes were also shot in Loretta Lynn's Madison, Tennessee, home on Barbara Drive.

The replica of Lynn's home in Butcher Hollow, built at Bottom Fork, Letcher County, Kentucky, was burned by arsonists. It was on the front porch of that house that Levon Helm, drummer and singer of the rock group The Band, made his acting debut as Lynn's father.

In an interview with Merv Griffin broadcast on November 7, 1978, Loretta Lynn said that Harrison Ford had been originally cast.

== Historical inaccuracies ==
The film emphasizes Lynn's self-fabricated myth that she got married at the age of 13. The myth went uncontested until May 2012, when the Associated Press unearthed her Kentucky birth certificate, revealing that Lynn was actually almost 16 at the time of her marriage. When contacted by the AP before the exposé went to publication, Lynn's spokeswoman declined comment. The discrepancy is significant as it alters the narrative Lynn spun in books and other public forums. In reality, it would have been illegal for a girl under the age of 15 to marry in Kentucky.

There are other events depicted in the film that are contrary to actual facts:

- Patsy Cline never owned a tour bus, although she had thought about purchasing one shortly before her death.
- Cline's plane crash did not occur early in the morning as the DJ on the radio in Lynn's bedroom stated; it happened shortly after 6:00 in the evening.
- "You Ain't Woman Enough (To Take My Man)" was not inspired by one of Mooney's cheating episodes, which was caught by Lynn while touring with Cline, as the film suggests. The inspiration came from a fan of Lynn, whom she met backstage. The fan told Lynn how another woman had been trying to steal her husband from her, to which Lynn replied, "Why she ain't woman enough to take your man," instantly giving Lynn an idea for a song title. Also, the film portrayed Lynn singing the song to Cline while writing it; the song was not recorded until late 1965, nearly three years after Cline's death; so it was likely that Lynn didn't write the song (and met the fan who inspired it) until after Cline's death as well.
- In the film, just before Cline's death, Lynn tells her she is pregnant with twins; given this is the last time they see each other, this would have happened February to March 1963. Lynn's twin daughters were in fact born August 6, 1964, roughly 17 months after Cline's death.

== Soundtrack ==
Coal Miner's Daughter: Original Motion Picture Soundtrack

Soundtrack album by various artists
- Released: March 7, 1980
- Recorded: 1980
- Studios: Bradley's Barn, Mount Juliet, Tennessee
- Genre: Country
- Label: MCA Nashville
- Producer: Owen Bradley

Professional ratings
Review scores
Source	Rating
AllMusic	4.5/5 stars

Coal Miner's Daughter: Original Motion Picture Soundtrack was released on March 7, 1980, under the MCA Nashville label. It included music by Beverly D'Angelo, Levon Helm, and Sissy Spacek except for the "End Credits Medley" and material by other artists that were not under contract to MCA. The album was certified Gold by the RIAA on January 11, 1982 and has been released on vinyl, cassette tape, and CD. Levon Helm's "Blue Moon of Kentucky" was released as a single on 7-inch vinyl, both as a double-A-side and also with Allen Toussaint's "Working in the Coal Mine", a non-album track also sung by Helm, on the B-side. The soundtrack would win Country Music Association Award for Album of the Year in 1980, the first of only two soundtracks to do so. (O Brother, Where Art Thou? would be the other in 2001.)

No.	Title	Writer(s)	Performer	Length
1.	"The Titanic"	A.P. Carter, Sara Carter, Maybelle Carter	Sissy Spacek	2:29
2.	"Blue Moon of Kentucky"	Bill Monroe	Levon Helm	2:51
3.	"There He Goes"	Eddie Miller, Durwood Haddock, W.S. Stevenson	Sissy Spacek	2:11
4.	"I'm a Honky Tonk Girl"	Loretta Lynn	Sissy Spacek	2:22
5.	"Amazing Grace"	John Newton	Funeral Guests	2:08
6.	"Walkin' After Midnight"	Donn Hecht, Alan Block	Beverly D'Angelo	2:21
7.	"Crazy"	H.W. Nelson	Beverly D'Angelo	2:45
8.	"I Fall to Pieces"	Hank Cochran, Harlan Howard	Sissy Spacek	2:48
9.	"Sweet Dreams"	Don Gibson	Beverly D'Angelo	2:37
10.	"Back in Baby's Arms"	Bob Montgomery	Sissy Spacek, Beverly D'Angelo	2:10
11.	"One's on the Way"	Shel Silverstein	Sissy Spacek	2:42
12.	"You Ain't Woman Enough To Take My Man"	Lynn	Sissy Spacek	2:18
13.	"You're Lookin' at Country"	Lynn	Sissy Spacek	2:26
14.	"Coal Miner's Daughter"	Lynn	Sissy Spacek	3:04

=== Charts and certifications ===
Weekly charts

Chart (1980)	Peak position
Australia (Kent Music Report)	98
Canada Country Albums (RPM)	1
Canada Top Albums (RPM)	23
US Top Country Albums (Billboard)	2
US Billboard 200	40

Year-end Charts

Chart (1980)	Position
Canada Top Albums (RPM)	97

Certifications

Country	Certification
United States	Gold

Preceded by Together by The Oak Ridge Boys	RPM Country Albums number-one album May 10–31, 1980	Succeeded by Together by The Oak Ridge Boys

== Reception ==
=== Box office ===
In its opening weekend in the United States and Canada, Coal Miner's Daughter was number 1 at the box office, grossing $3.6 million in 796 theaters. The film grossed a total of $67.1 million in the United States and Canada, becoming the seventh highest-grossing film of 1980 in North America.

=== Critical response ===
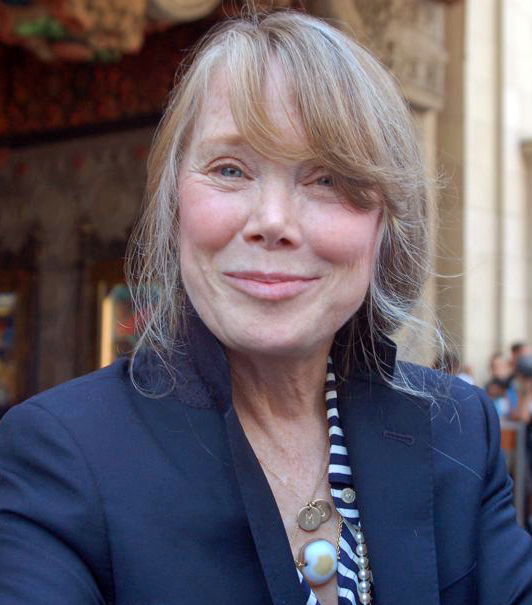
Sissy Spacek's portrayal of Loretta Lynn garnered widespread critical acclaim, earning her the Academy Award for Best Actress.

On review aggregator Rotten Tomatoes, Coal Miner's Daughter holds an approval rating of 84% based on 63 reviews, with an average rating of 7.9/10. The website's critical consensus reads: "Like a classic traditional country song, Coal Miner's Daughter draws on time-tested formula -- and undeniable talent -- to tell a solidly affecting story." On Metacritic, which assigns a rating to reviews, the film has a weighted average score of 84 out of 100, based on 7 critics, indicating "universal acclaim".

Variety called it "a thoughtful, endearing film charting the life of singer Loretta Lynn from the depths of poverty in rural Kentucky to her eventual rise to the title of 'queen of country music.'" Roger Ebert from The Chicago Times stated that the film "has been made with great taste and style; it's more intelligent and observant than movie biographies of singing stars used to be."

=== Accolades ===
Award	Category	Nominee(s)	Result
Academy Awards	Best Picture	Bernard Schwartz	Nominated
Academy Awards	Best Actress	Sissy Spacek	Won
Academy Awards	Best Screenplay – Based on Material from Another Medium	Thomas Rickman	Nominated
Academy Awards	Best Art Direction	John W. Corso and John M. Dwyer	Nominated
Academy Awards	Best Cinematography	Ralf D. Bode	Nominated
Academy Awards	Best Film Editing	Arthur Schmidt	Nominated
Academy Awards	Best Sound	Richard Portman, Roger Heman and James R. Alexander	Nominated
American Cinema Editors Awards	Best Edited Feature Film	Arthur Schmidt	Nominated
British Academy Film Awards	Best Actress in a Leading Role	Sissy Spacek	Nominated
British Academy Film Awards	Best Sound	Gordon Ecker, James R. Alexander, Richard Portman and Roger Heman Jr.	Nominated
Directors Guild of America Awards	Outstanding Directorial Achievement in Motion Pictures	Michael Apted	Nominated
Golden Globe Awards	Best Motion Picture – Musical or Comedy		Won
Golden Globe Awards	Best Actress in a Motion Picture – Musical or Comedy	Sissy Spacek	Won
Golden Globe Awards	Best Supporting Actor – Motion Picture	Tommy Lee Jones	Nominated
Golden Globe Awards	Best Supporting Actress – Motion Picture	Beverly D'Angelo	Nominated
Kansas City Film Critics Circle Awards	Best Actress	Sissy Spacek	Won
Los Angeles Film Critics Association Awards	Best Actress	Sissy Spacek	Won
National Board of Review Awards	Top Ten Films		3rd Place
National Board of Review Awards	Best Actress	Sissy Spacek	Won
National Film Preservation Board	National Film Registry		Inducted
National Society of Film Critics Awards	Best Actress	Sissy Spacek	Won
New York Film Critics Circle Awards	Best Actress	Sissy Spacek	Won
Writers Guild of America Awards	Best Drama Adapted from Another Medium	Thomas Rickman	Nominated

The film is recognized by American Film Institute in these lists:

- 2006: AFI's 100 Years...100 Cheers – #70

== Home media ==
- This film was released on LaserDisc on two separate releases. The first release was in May 1980, and the extended play version was released in July 1981. These releases were both made by MCA DiscoVision.
- The film was released in the VHS format in the 1980s by MCA Home Video and on March 1, 1992, by MCA/Universal Home Video.
- On September 13, 2005, Universal released a 25th Anniversary Edition on DVD in widescreen (1.85:1) format and featuring the music tracks remixed to 5.1 Dolby Digital stereo, leaving the dialogue and effects tracks as they were on the original mono soundtrack from 1980.
- That same DVD was included in a four-pack DVD set that also included Smokey and the Bandit, The Best Little Whorehouse in Texas, and Fried Green Tomatoes.
- On January 7, 2014, Universal Pictures released the film on Blu-ray.
- On September 9, 2025, in honor of the film's 45th anniversary, Universal Pictures released the film on 4K Ultra HD Blu-ray.

== Broadway adaptation ==
On May 10, 2012, at the Grand Ole Opry, Lynn announced that Zooey Deschanel was to portray her in a Broadway musical adaptation. Production stalled until after Lynn's death, when in 2025 Lynn's family announced work was beginning on a revision of the musical starring Sutton Foster and directed by Sam Gold, with musical production by Jeanine Tesori.

One episode of The Simpsons, titled "Colonel Homer", is based partly on this film. The episode also stars Beverly D'Angelo as cocktail waitress Lurleen Lumpkin.
