= Mercyless =

French band

Mercyless is a death/thrash group from France. Active from 1987 to 2001 and again from 2011, they among others released albums on Restless Records and Century Media Records.

Reviewing Mercyless' album Abject Offerings, Metal.de called Mercyless, Loudblast and Massacra the "three pillars of the French death metal scene". Allmusic stated that Mercyless were "one of only a handful of the country's [death metal] bands to gain recognition outside their own borders".

== Discography ==
- Abject Offerings (1992)
- Coloured Funeral (1993)
- C.O.L.D (1996)
- Sure To Be Pure (2000)
- Unholy Black Splendor (2013)
- Pathetic Divinity (2016)
- The Mother Of All Plagues (2020)
