= Bernard Schwartz (producer) =

American producer

- Born: December 9, 1917; Manhattan, New York, U.S.
- Died: October 17, 2003 (aged 85); Los Angeles, California, U.S.
- Occupation: Producer
- Spouse: Suzanne Schwartz
- Children: 2

Bernard Schwartz (December 9, 1917 – October 17, 2003) was an American producer. He was nominated for an Academy Award in the category Best Picture for the film Coal Miner's Daughter.

Schwartz died in October 2003 from complications of a stroke, at the age of 85.

== Selected filmography ==
- Coal Miner's Daughter (1980)
