= Mass Appeal Madness =

EP by Napalm Death
- Released: 28 May 1991
- Genre: Deathgrind
- Length: 8:54
- Label: Earache
- Producer: Napalm Death

Napalm Death chronology
Harmony Corruption (1990)	Mass Appeal Madness (1991)	Death by Manipulation (1991)

Professional ratings
Review scores
Source	Rating
Spin Alternative Record Guide	7/10

Mass Appeal Madness is an EP by Napalm Death. It was released in 1991 on Earache Records and is dedicated to the memory of Roger Patterson, the bassist of death metal band Atheist who died earlier in the same year.

== Track listing ==
No.	Title	Length
1.	"Mass Appeal Madness"	3:29
2.	"Pride Assassin"	2:05
3.	"Unchallenged Hate"	2:07
4.	"Social Sterility"	1:13

- The songs "Unchallenged Hate" and "Social Sterility" are different recordings than the versions found on From Enslavement to Obliteration

== Personnel ==
- Mark "Barney" Greenway – lead vocals
- Jesse Pintado – guitar
- Mitch Harris – guitar
- Shane Embury – bass
- Mick Harris – drums, backing vocals
