= Don Grashey =

- Born: Dominic Michael Guarasci; November 1, 1925
- Origin: Vancouver, British Columbia, Canada
- Died: September 12, 2005 (aged 79)
- Genre: Country
- Occupations: Songwriter, music producer
- Labels: Zero; Gaiety; Golden Eagle
- Award: Canadian Country Music Hall of Fame

Dominic Michael Guarasci (November 1, 1925 – September 12, 2005), better known as Don Grashey, was a Canadian songwriter and music producer, best known as the owner of Zero, Gaiety and Golden Eagle records.

== Producing career ==
In the late 1950s, Grashey met Chuck Williams in Thunder Bay, and the pair moved to Vancouver where with the financial help of Norm Burley, a retired lumber industry executive, and Art Phillips (who would later become Mayor of Vancouver), they formed Zero Records. Grashey was the company's President, overseeing the A&R Department and the publishing company Trilite Music. Grashey ran the business as he saw fit, signed the acts he wanted to record and promoted them without interference from any of the other shareholders. He had cheque-signing privileges for the company bank account to prevent any recurrence of a previous fiasco he had with Jury Records.

In 1955, Grashey wrote the song "Are You Mine", and Myrna Lorrie and Buddy DeVal recorded it as a duet. The song was released via Abbott Records and reached the top of the charts in the U.S. Two other duet versions were released and played on the radio simultaneously in the U.S., with Ginny Wright and Tom Tall scoring a #2 hit and Red Sovine and Goldie Hill earning a Top 20 hit. "Are You Mine" has since been recorded by George Jones & Margie Singleton, Ernest Tubb & Loretta Lynn, Lucille Starr & Bob Regan, Carroll Baker & Jerry Palmer, George & June Pasher, and others.

In 1959, Williams heard Loretta Lynn perform at a backyard jam session held in a converted chicken coop in Vancouver, British Columbia, just over the border from Custer, Washington, where the singer was living with her husband and children.

Williams and Grashey returned on a Sunday and Grashey believed she was "terrific". Grashey signed Lynn to Zero Records on February 1, 1960. In her 1976 autobiography, Coal Miner's Daughter, Lynn credits the duo, as follows, "There was one fellow named Don Grashey who had some business sense, and he ran the record company for Mr. Burley."

Grashey produced Lynn's first recording session which took place in Hollywood in March, 1960 and resulted in the hit single "I'm a Honky Tonk Girl". The session used Western Recorders studio and Don Blake as engineer. The backup musicians were Speedy West as steel guitarist and leader of the band, Harold Hensely (fiddle), Roy Lanham (guitar), Al Williams (bass), and Muddy Berry (drums). Lynn did a second recording session for Zero records in 1960, after Grashey had left the company, and he believed that in later years she may have confused the two sessions, for the description of her Zero Records days that she gives in Coal Miner's Daughter contains inaccuracies. Grashey and Williams were the driving forces behind the career of singer Carroll Baker. George Petralia, a songwriter and sculptor, heard Carroll Baker on a live radio show from the Hayloft Jamboree in Markham, Ontario, and he introduced her to Grashey, and sponsored her first recording. Grashey went on to produce her records and managed her career from the beginning until the late nineteen eighties. Petralia, who had written the song "Mem'ries of Home", asked Baker to record it; the resulting hit stayed on the charts for 26 weeks in 1970.

Baker, "Canada's Queen of Country Music and Canada's First Lady of Country", was nominated for 18 years in a row in the Women's Country of the Year category. Carroll went on to win three Juno Awards. She was named entertainer of the year in 1979 and country artist of the year in 1980. She also received CCMA Awards as female vocalist of the year in 1982 and 1985, and for top-selling album (Hymns of Gold) in 1986, and for best-selling album (Christmas Carroll) in 1990.

As a songwriter and music publisher, Grashey was nothing short of prolific. In addition to the mega success of "Are You Mine", his early career songwriting included recordings of "Are You The One" by Jim Reeves and "I'm Your Man (I'm Your Gal)" recorded by Nashville trio The Browns. In Canada, his songs were recorded by Jerry Palmer (who cut some 20 of Grashey's compositions, including the Top 10 hits, "Did I Forget To Tell Her", "Not Living, Not Dying (Just Hanging On)" and "A Picture’s Worth A Thousand Words".

Grashey's 50-plus years were recognized in 1980 when he was presented with the RPM Canadian Music Industry Hall of Fame Award; and in 1989 he was among the inaugural inductees into the Canadian Country Music Hall of Fame. His career memorabilia is currently on display in the Canadian Country Music Hall of Fame museum in Calgary.

In addition to his country music career, Grashey also ventured into rock. Most of the albums were licensed to larger labels like Alberta's 49th Parallel (Maverick), The Souls in Inspyration(CBS) (Red Lake, ON), Jarvis Street Revue (CBS) (Thunder Bay, ON), but a number appeared on his Gaiety imprint. No major hits, but lots of interesting music from bands such as the White Knights, Checkerlads (Regina SK). Pacemaker Entertainment reissued most of the Gaiety albums and singles (on a pair of compilations) and purchased these masters from Grashey shortly before he died. Unidisc bought the rest of his masters and publishing.

Grashey and Joseph Mauro teamed up in 1995 to release his autobiography entitled "My Rambling Heart". Mauro also narrated a cassette and CD version of the book.

== Death ==
On September 12, 2005, Grashey died in hospital at the age of 79; Baker sang at his memorial.

Grashey's passing occurred on the morning of the presentation of the 2005 Canadian Country Music Awards Show, and came only ten days after Williams' death.
