= I'm a Honky Tonk Girl =

Single by Loretta Lynn
- B-side: "Whispering Sea"
- Released: March 1960
- Recorded: February 1960; Los Angeles, California
- Genre: Bakersfield sound
- Length: 2:15
- Label: Zero
- Songwriter: Loretta Lynn
- Producer: Don Grashey

Loretta Lynn singles chronology
"I'm a Honky Tonk Girl" (1960)	"Heartaches Meet Mr. Blues" (1960)

"I'm a Honky Tonk Girl" is the debut single by American country music artist Loretta Lynn, released in March 1960. The song was among the first to not only be recorded by Lynn, but also to be penned by her. She composed the song while living in Washington State, maintaining her role as a housewife and occasional member of a local country music band. The composition was later recorded in California after Lynn was given money by a local businessman, who was impressed by her singing. "I'm a Honky Tonk Girl" was then issued as a single under the newly founded and independent Zero Records label in March 1960.

"I'm a Honky Tonk Girl" was self-promoted by Lynn and her husband, driving from one radio station to another. The effort paid off by that summer when it peaked at #14 on the Billboard country songs chart. The story behind the song's promotion became one of the trademarks of Lynn's career. Its story was profiled in the 1980 film about her life Coal Miner's Daughter and has been covered by other artists. "I'm a Honky Tonk Girl" has since received positive praise from music critics and writers alike, who have credited the song as being one of her signature tunes.

== Background and composition ==
Lynn was inspired to compose "I'm a Honky Tonk Girl" from a woman she met while performing in a club in Washington state. As the woman became more intoxicated, she would tell Lynn more details of her story and would cry uncontrollably. The woman told Lynn of how her husband had left her for another woman. The pair developed a friendship that would last for several years. Lynn then wrote the song while leaning up against her home's bathroom toilet seat in twenty minutes, using a seventeen dollar guitar that her husband bought her as an anniversary present. She recounted the song's composition in 2010, "I just sat down with my guitar...I was outside and leaning up against the toilet in Washington State. And I sat there and wrote 'Honky Tonk Girl' and 'Whispering Sea.'"

"I'm a Honky Tonk Girl" was recorded in the style of the Bakersfield Sound and had a "west coast shuffle". Named after the California town of the same name, the Bakersfield Sound was a unique style of country music that was characterized by electric guitars that created a "clear" and "ringing" quality. The song has a basic chord progression of G–D–A–D but is in the key of C#. She later explained why the song was written in this key, "They told me in Nashville they couldn't believe it, what you're writing! All your keys are funny. ‘Cause they wrote D, G and A, you know. I was going out on a limb a little bit, but I didn't realize that. I started playing rhythm guitar with my brother and a steel player when I first started singing. And I played barre chord rhythm. I had all sorts of notes on the guitar at that time, now I probably wouldn't remember all of them."

== Recording ==
Lynn was given the opportunity to record "I'm a Honky Tonk Girl" by Norm Burley, who heard her sing on a local television show. Impressed by the composition, he gave money to Lynn and her husband to take a trip to Los Angeles, California and record the song. One of Burley's business partners was Canadian producer Don Grashey, who had founded the California label Zero Records and signed her to the label. Lynn's husband Oliver Lynn arranged for studio musician Speedy West to play on the recording. West then sought out several other California country musicians to join him on the song's session. "I'm a Honky Tonk Girl" was officially recorded in February 1960 at the Western Recorders Studio and was produced by Don Grashey. Speedy West accompanied the session by playing steel guitar. Additional musicians on the song's recording were Roy Lanham, (originally thought bass was played by Al Williams but per the session contract (L47) it was Red Wootten), Muddy Berry, and Harold Hensley.

== Release and reception ==
"I'm a Honky Tonk Girl" was issued in March 1960 as a 7" single via Zero Records. Its B-side was another self-penned song by Lynn, "Whispering Sea". The song was her debut single and became a success due in large part to the independent promotion of Lynn and her husband. Oliver Lynn mailed out 3,500 copies along with a photograph of her that he took to country music stations across the United States, but did not hear back from any of them. By the summer of 1960, Lynn and her husband decided to use their own car to drive to every radio station to promote the record. Lynn recounted the story in the 2003 book, Finding Her Voice: The History of Women in Country Music: "We were pitiful...Because we were too poor to stay in hotels, we slept in the car and ate baloney and cheese sandwiches in the parks...Then we'd go into the radio station and pester the DJ to play my record. We didn't care if it was a 500-watt local station or a 50,000-watt clear-channel station. We'd hit them all. We were on the road three months." Once the Lynn's had arrived in Nashville, Tennessee, "I'm a Honky Tonk Girl" had become a major hit. It peaked at number No. 14 on the Billboard Hot Country Songs chart in the summer of 1960. It also charted in Music Vendor at No. 12 and Cash Box at No. 30.

"Honky Tonk Girl" was not included on an official album until the release of Lynn's box set of music entitled Honky Tonk Girl: The Loretta Lynn Collection. Released on MCA Records in 1994, the song was the opening track on the box set as the release chronicled some of her biggest recordings over the years. With the success of the record Lynn was building a loyal fan base and her first fan club was formed by, Mary Ann Cooper, in November 1960.

"I'm a Honky Tonk Girl" was mainly well received by critics. Paul Zollo of American Songwriter commented that the song "reflected country life as it was really lived" and that it helped the public "fall in love" with her artistry. Robert K. Oermann of Finding Her Voice: The History of Women in Country Music drew similarities of Lynn's vocals to that of country music singer Kitty Wells, "The 1960 single reveals that Loretta was patterning herself after Kitty Wells, then the dominant female country star. Her vocal style is very much in the weepy Wells style, and the number is in the seduced-and-abandoned mode that Kitty popularized in hits like "It Wasn't God Who Made Honky Tonk Angels."

"I'm a Honky Tonk Girl" prompted the rise of Lynn's musical career. The song's success was heard by country music duo The Wilburn Brothers, who invited her to tour with them. Country music artist Ernest Tubb was also impressed by the single and invited Lynn to perform on his syndicated Midnite Jamboree program. The performance would also bring her to the attention of the Grand Ole Opry, performing the song shortly after her performance on Tubb's radio program. This later led her to the attention of Nashville producer Owen Bradley, who signed Lynn to Decca Records in 1961. Under her new label, Lynn would become one of the most successful female country artists of the decade.

The song was brought to international attention in Lynn's Academy Award-winning biopic Coal Miner's Daughter (1980). The film specifically-chronicled how the Lynn's self-promoted "I'm a Honky Tonk Girl" by traveling to individual radio stations and convincing programmers to play the record. Critics and writers have since described its promotion with praise. Robert K. Oermann of Finding Her Voice: The History of Women in Country Music called the story of "Honky Tonk Girl"'s promotion "astonishing". Kurt Wolff of the book Country Music: The Rough Guide commented that the Lynn's "adopted a grassroots approach" when releasing the single.

== Cover versions ==
Various music artists have covered "I'm a Honky Tonk Girl". Actress Sissy Spacek recorded a version of "Honky Tonk Girl" for Lynn's 1980 film biopic Coal Miner's Daughter. Spacek also appears in the film performing the song.

In 1982 British singer-songwriter Elvis Costello included a cover version of the song on his 1982 extended play release I'm Your Toy.

American country artist Lee Ann Womack recorded the song for Lynn's 2010 tribute album entitled Coal Miner's Daughter: A Tribute to Loretta Lynn.

Miranda Lambert performed "Honky Tonk Girl" live in tribute to Lynn at the Grand Ole Opry in 2013. Rolling Stone reviewed Lambert's performance positively, stating that Lambert "belts out the lyrics, which are rife with loss and regret, Lynn looks on approvingly, singing along from her front-row seat in the Grand Ole Opry House and commenting on the performance to one of her daughters seated next to her."

In 2014 Loretta's granddaughter, Tayla Lynn, released the song featuring her grandmother on the track.

In 2017, Charley Crockett covered the song, reworking the title to be Honky Tonk Man on his 3rd studio album Lil' G.L.'s Honky Tonk Jubilee as the albums 11th track.

== Track listings ==
7" vinyl single

- "I'm a Honky Tonk Girl" – 2:15
- "Whispering Sea" – 2:13

== Charts ==
=== Weekly charts ===
Chart (1960)	Peak position
US Hot Country Songs (Billboard)	14
