= Zero Records =

Zero Records was a record label founded in 1959 in Vancouver, British Columbia, Canada.

== History ==
In the late 1950s, Don Grashey met Charlie Chuck Williams (Chuck) in Thunder Bay. The pair later moved to Vancouver.

With the financial help of Norm Burley (the majority owner) and Art Phillips, who would later become Mayor of Vancouver, Zero Records was formed. The company's intended market from the beginning was the United States.

Grashey would run the business as president, the A&R Department and the publishing company Trilite Music. Grashey would run the business as he saw fit, sign the acts he wanted to sign and record and promote them without interference from any of the other shareholders. He had cheque-signing privileges for the company bank account to prevent any recurrence of the fiasco of Jury Records. Williams served as vice-president. Agnes Mackie took over as general manager of the label in May 1960.

Under the direction of Don Grashey, Zero Records produced and recorded singers like Loretta Lynn, Lucille Starr, Myrna Lorrie, and Buddy De Val.

Regarding Loretta Lynn, it was on live TV over KTNT in Tacoma Washington that Vancouver businessman Norm Burley then and there decided to record and released a local talent featured, the housewife-turned singer named Loretta Lynn her first single on Zero Records entitled, "I'm a Honky Tonk Girl", in February 1960, which was recorded in Los Angeles along with three other sides. The record was largely marketed by Lynn the hard way, driving in her personal vehicle and dropping in on radio stations unannounced. Unorthodox at the time, the marketing effort worked, and the record eventually achieved the position of #14 on the country singles chart. Lynn's contract was shortly purchased from Zero by Decca.

Distribution of Zero was managed by Sparton Records. Although a Canadian company, the records were manufactured and warehoused in the United States.

When Zero records closed, Grashey and Williams founded the DMG Sound Studio.

== Artists ==
- Carroll Baker
- Buddy De Val
- Loretta Lynn
- Gene Mack
- Orella Meyers
- Bob Regan
- Brad Reynolds
- Lucille Starr
- Myrna Lorrie
