= Those Once Loyal =

2005 album by Bolt Thrower

Studio album by Bolt Thrower
- Released: 11 November 2005
- Recorded: May–September 2005
- Studio: Sable Rose (Coventry)
- Genres: Death metal; heavy metal
- Length: 39:32
- Label: Metal Blade
- Producers: Bolt Thrower; Andy Faulkner

Bolt Thrower chronology
| Honour – Valour – Pride (2001) | Those Once Loyal (2005) | War (2010) |

Those Once Loyal is the eighth and final studio album by British death metal band Bolt Thrower, released on 11 November 2005 by Metal Blade Records. Recorded with producer Andy Faulkner at Sable Rose Studios in Coventry, England, it was the first Bolt Thrower album since Mercenary (1998) to feature vocalist Karl Willetts, who rejoined the band in November 2004.

Musically, Those Once Loyal incorporates tighter song structures and arrangements into Bolt Thrower's melodic, groove-based sound, while enhancing the production quality of the band's previous albums. As with their earlier works, the lyrics address various aspects of war. Commentators and music critics have said that the album has a thematic focus on World War I, which was previously explored on the band's fifth album ...For Victory (1994); its cover artwork was derived from a plaque on the Guards Memorial in St. James's Park, London.

Well received by critics upon release, Those Once Loyal debuted at number 76 on the German Offizielle Top 100 chart, becoming the highest-charting album of Bolt Thrower's career. The band supported the album's release with the Those Still Loyal Tour across Europe, running from January to June 2006. Those Once Loyal would be Bolt Thrower's final album before the band announced an indefinite hiatus from recording in June 2008, although they continued to tour until the death of drummer Martin Kearns on 14 September 2015 and their subsequent disbandment in 2016, on the first anniversary of his death.

== Background and recording ==
In 2001, Bolt Thrower released their seventh album, Honour – Valour – Pride, featuring Benediction vocalist Dave Ingram. The band began writing material for a follow-up to the album in January 2004 without Ingram, who had distanced himself from the band amidst worsening personal and mental health issues. After Ingram left Bolt Thrower in August 2004 to focus on his health, guitarist Barry Thomson reconnected with former vocalist Karl Willetts, who agreed to rejoin the band in November 2004. Willetts' vocal capabilities were tested as soon as he rejoined Bolt Thrower, who made him re-record Ingram's vocals over the instrumental tracks of Honour – Valour – Pride, derived from the album's master tapes. Although guitarist Gavin Ward stated that Bolt Thrower had no intentions of releasing Willetts' re-recording of Honour – Valour – Pride, as it would "cheapen the product" and be insulting to Ingram, the band eventually released a rough mix of Willetts' re-recording of "K-Machine" in May 2005 owing to fan demand.

As with Bolt Thrower's previous albums, the writing process for Those Once Loyal revolved around Thomson writing guitar riffs and solos that the other members of the band would make their own adjustments to, according to Ward. They would end up writing between 25 and 30 songs—of which 10 would make the final album—equivalent to "four hard drives worth of material and [almost] a fifth", Ward said. "Salvo" was the first song written for the album. Willetts, who was primarily responsible for writing the album's lyrics, visited several places with significant military history for lyrical inspiration, including The Cenotaph and the Horse Guards Parade (both in London), Turnaware Point in Falmouth, Cornwall (an embarkation point for the US Infantry 5th Corps in the D-Day landing) and Flanders Fields in Belgium. Afterwards, Ward provided Willetts with notebooks featuring song titles and additional subject matter. (Note: Willetts credited his degree in Cultural Studies, which he studied at the University of Birmingham for three years in the mid-to-late 1990s, for helping him "formulate a post modernistic deconstructive method" of writing lyrics, and for teaching him "the importance of research – reading books.")

Following some rehearsals and pre-production at the studio (including the installation of a new mixing desk), Bolt Thrower commenced the recording of Those Once Loyal with Honour – Valour – Pride producer Andy Faulkner at Sable Rose Studios, Coventry, on 16 May 2005. The band recorded their parts for the album in a piecemeal fashion, starting with Martin Kearns' drum tracks, followed by Thomson's and Ward's guitar parts, Jo Bench's basslines, and finally Willetts' vocals. Bolt Thrower began mixing the album in late August 2005, after making some adjustments to its songs. The band allowed Faulkner to mix Those Once Loyal independently at first, before they collaborated to reach a compromise between their differing visions for the album, according to Thomson. The album's recording and production were documented in six "studio reports," written by Kearns (with one by Willetts) and posted on Bolt Thrower's official website.

Recording was completed in mid-September 2005. During both the writing and recording of Those Once Loyal, Bolt Thrower's songs underwent frequent and meticulous rewrites and revisions concerning their compositions, lyrics, tempos, and the structure of the track listing. Bench said that she was unable to hear the final album until it was mastered. Had they not been constrained by deadlines set by their record label, Metal Blade Records, and by upcoming touring commitments, Thomson believed Bolt Thrower would have still been in the studio rewriting their songs by the time of the album's release.

== Composition ==
=== Music ===
Those Once Loyal is a death metal and heavy metal album. Described by critics as a continuation of the sound of Bolt Thrower's previous albums, particularly those of Mercenary and Honour – Valour – Pride, it features mid-tempo grooves, melodic riffs and guitar solos, heavy percussion, and growled vocals, while incorporating shorter, tighter arrangements into their sound. The album has also been noted for its cleaner, more "natural-sounding" production compared to previous albums. Bench's bass, in particular, has received attention from critics for its unusual prominence in the mix. Bench has commented on the album's mixing:

It was a bit of a gamble because [Bolt Thrower's] sound has been based on the whole 'wall of guitars', but not necessarily the bass guitar. So we thought if we pushed the bass higher in the mix that we may lose something else. But it worked out great! My bass sound was the best I've ever had and it just complimented the overall sound of the album. We're still learning as far as production goes but yeah, we're all really happy with how it came out.

"The Killchain" was written as the final part of a "chain" of six songs, beginning with the title track of Bolt Thrower's debut album In Battle There is No Law! (1988) and continuing with "World Eater", "Cenotaph", "Embers", and "Powder Burns". The band intended to perform this "chain" of songs together live as one suite.

=== Lyrics ===
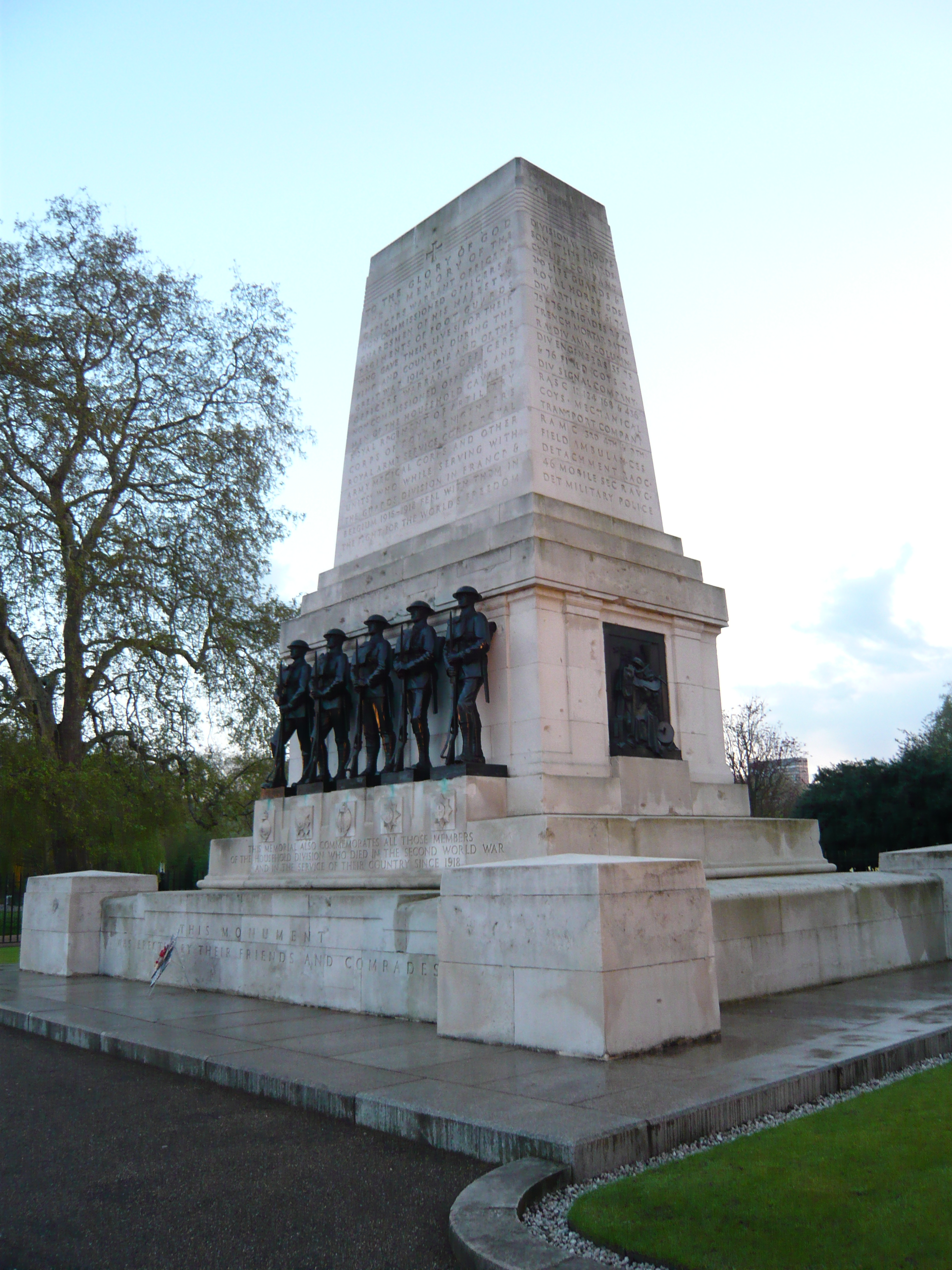
The Guards Memorial in St. James's Park, London. The album cover is derived from a plaque found on the memorial.

In line with Bolt Thrower's previous albums, the lyrics of Those Once Loyal discuss various aspects of war, ranging from its effects on individuals and groups, to honour, loyalty and camaraderie, which Willetts considered its "positive aspects". Despite the album's distinctly militaristic song titles and themes, Willetts and Ward have stated that the lyrics of Those Once Loyal are not intended to glorify war. Several critics and commentators have said that the album has a thematic focus on World War I, which the band had previously addressed on their fifth album ...For Victory (1994). In a 2005 interview with Metal Italia, Ward said that although the album does not have a specific concept, there were "eras or battles that inspired Karl more than others", including World War I. Similarly, Joseph Schafer of Invisible Oranges wrote that although its songs "center on World War I, [they] could be applied to any modern industrialized war."

The opening track of Those Once Loyal, "At First Light", "describes the prelude to going over the top"; Willetts remarked that "waiting and anticipation is a recurring theme throughout the music [Bolt Thrower] create [...] It's about the psychological effects, the feelings." "The Killchain" explores the asymmetrical, "computerized and detached" nature of modern warfare. Other songs, however, do not focus specifically on war; in a 2007 interview with Metal Review, Willetts stated that "Entrenched" can be viewed "as your position in life", and "the battlefield you can equate to your everyday life".

In a 2014 academic paper discussing the relevance of World War I in popular music, British cultural historian Peter Grant wrote that ...For Victory and Those Once Loyal both "contain highly graphic, though stylised, point-of-view songs, but with no identified protagonist and no sense of the ability of the individual to influence events". Grant additionally described how Bolt Thrower presented the subject of war, particularly in relation to World War I, citing the title track of ...For Victory and "At First Light" as notable examples:

Both songs evoke the terrors and horrors of war, immensely magnified by the music, but paradoxically adopt a sober, neutral stance that does not condemn war outright, instead presenting the listener with its impact [...] Bolt Thrower's contemplation of war in general and the First World War in particular is complex and distinctive. They avoid simple stereotypes and instead express the ambiguities of warfare: it is both horrifying and glorious, both insane and necessary.

=== Title and artwork ===
The cover art of Those Once Loyal is derived from a plaque found on the Guards Memorial, a World War I memorial, in St. James's Park, London. Bench, who conceived the idea of using the plaque for the cover, stated that Bolt Thrower aimed to distance themselves from the "fantasy battle" artwork used on their previous releases and sought something that was less predictable and more "epic-looking". The band commissioned a photograph of the plaque before it was transformed into a cover by Jan Meininghaus. Regarding the album's title, Ward remarked: "It's about soldiers. They were once loyal, and now they are no longer loyal because [they're] dead!". In a 2006 interview with Metal Rules, Willetts also stated that the title was intended as a tribute to those who supported Bolt Thrower during their 20-year career, such as John Peel, but "most importantly it's really aimed at the fans [...] for without them we wouldn't be here."

== Release ==
=== Promotion ===
On 8 September 2005, Bolt Thrower announced the release date and track listing for Those Once Loyal. Prior to its release, Metal Blade Records launched an "online player" that allowed users to listen to two songs from the album and organised several "release parties" in Germany and Austria in early November 2005. To prevent the album from leaking onto peer-to-peer file-sharing sites, some promotional copies of Those Once Loyal were overdubbed with recordings stating, "This is the new album from Bolt Thrower!" at various intervals, featuring the band members. (Note: Ward: "We [Bolt Thrower] did [the voiceovers] ourselves. By the second song, though, we were like, 'Fuckin' 'ell, this is bloody annoying'. It got to the stage where we even did it backwards on one track because we'd got so fucking bored doing it. [...] We nearly recorded stuff about the record label, like 'Metal Blade is a load of shit'. They'd have been gutted, but we didn't do it because at the end of the day [they've] still paid for it!")

Those Once Loyal was first released in Germany on 11 November 2005, coinciding with Armistice Day. It was subsequently released to the rest of Europe on 14 November 2005 and in the United States on 15 November 2005. Alongside the album's standard CD and vinyl releases, Metal Blade issued a limited edition digipak version of Those Once Loyal, featuring the bonus track "A Symbol of Eight". The album debuted and peaked at number 76 on the German Offizielle Top 100 chart, becoming the highest-charting album of Bolt Thrower's career.

=== Those Still Loyal Tour ===
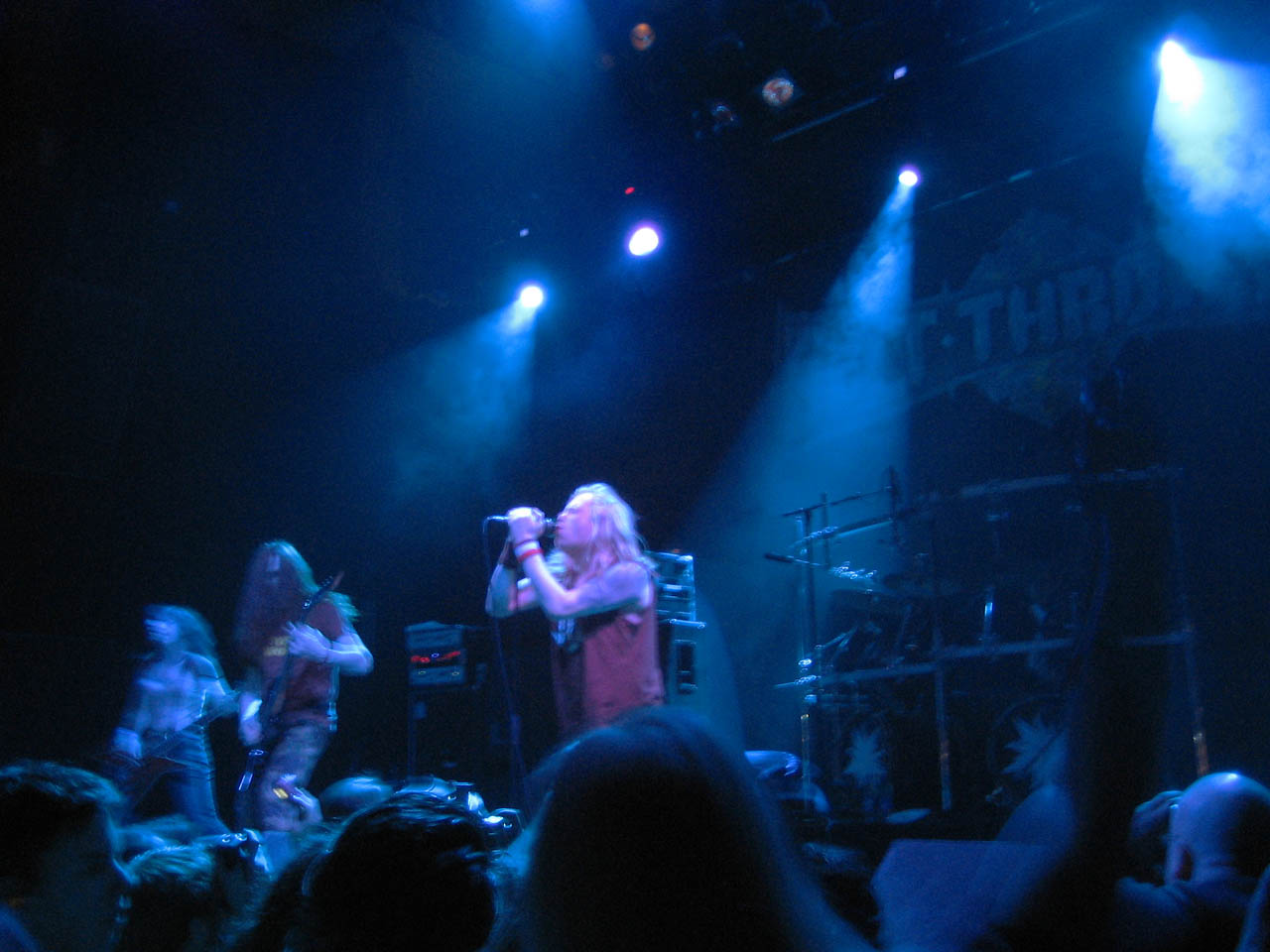
Bolt Thrower performing at the 2006 Inferno Metal Festival in Oslo, Norway

Bolt Thrower embarked on the Those Still Loyal Tour across Europe between January and June 2006. The tour's name also serves as a tribute to Bolt Thrower's supporters. The band was supported by Malevolent Creation, Nightrage, and Necrophagist on the first leg of the tour, which lasted from January to February 2006, and by God Dethroned, Kataklysm, and others on the second leg, between April and May 2006. The band also made appearances at the Inferno Metal Festival in Oslo, Norway and the Rock Hard Festival in Gelsenkirchen, Germany. Bolt Thrower planned to take the Those Still Loyal Tour to the United States—which would have marked their first tour in the country since 1994—but were forced to cancel due to a lack of support from Metal Blade.

On 18 January 2006, Bolt Thrower cancelled a planned performance at the Anomalia Club in Prato, Italy, after one of its roadies was electrocuted four times due to reported electrical problems at the venue. The venue's promoter released a statement blaming Bolt Thrower for the cancellation of the show, although this response was disputed by Necrophagist frontman Muhammed Suiçmez, who stated that the venue's owners had been uncooperative when Bolt Thrower and others attempted to resolve the electrical issues. Bench expressed disappointment at the negative reactions to the cancellation online, stating, "We don't cancel shows without a good reason and we've only pulled a handful of shows over 20 years [...] I thought [our fans] knew us better than that."

== Reception ==
=== Contemporaneous reviews ===
Professional ratings
Review scores
| Source | Rating |
|---|---|
| AllMusic | 3.5/5 stars |
| Blabbermouth.net | 7/10 |
| Brave Words & Bloody Knuckles | 7/10 |
| Chronicles of Chaos | 9/10 |
| Metal.de | 9/10 |
| PopMatters | 7/10 |
| Rock Hard | 9/10 |
| Stylus | B |
| Terrorizer | 8.5/10 |
| Zero Tolerance | 4.5/6 |

Those Once Loyal was well received by critics upon its release. Jackie Smit of Chronicles of Chaos hailed the album as "a resounding triumph" that represents Bolt Thrower "at the absolute peak of their craft". Ian Finley praised the album in Terrorizer, describing it as "immune to the corrupting influence of all musical trends" while offering "the epitome of what a metal album should be: hard, fast and uncompromising". Likewise, Boris Kaiser of Rock Hard commended its mix of intensity, melodies, and catchy harmonies. Adrien Begrand of PopMatters praised the band's vocal and instrumental performances on the album, noting how its lyrics describe "the brutality of trench warfare, the empty feeling of facing certain death as the sun rises, and the poignancy of both the quiet battlefield and the granite cenotaphs [...] in remarkably eloquent detail". Cosmo Lee of Stylus Magazine felt that what the album lacked in "memorable songs", Bolt Thrower compensated with "top-notch riffs", as the band "has always been more about sound than the song". Lee also noted the album's "abstract" lyrical descriptions of war, which, while making it "tough to extract emotional significance" from, ensured its longevity.

Several contemporary critics compared the level of innovation in Those Once Loyal with that of Bolt Thrower's previous albums. In a mixed assessment, James Christopher Monger of AllMusic remarked that Bolt Thrower's lack of change was "either a strength to those who love them or a weakness to their detractors". Kevin Stewart-Panko of Decibel perceived several "noticeable" albeit "minute" changes to Bolt Thrower's sound in the album's riffs, bass sound, and Willetts' return to the band. Markus Endres of Metal.de said that the improvements in production resulted in a "clearer and therefore more precise" album. Similarly, Adam Chapman of Zero Tolerance stated that the album improved upon the production of their previous albums despite its songs lacking ...For Victory's "instantly memorable riffs". Blabbermouth.net commented that, despite the album's general lack of "innovations", Bolt Thrower's "quality, if not the originality, is always there". Despite perceiving that there was nothing on the album that was "really incredibly intriguing even if it is flawlessly executed", Exclaim! reviewer Jill Mikkelson found Those Once Loyal to be "a solid album" by "a solid band [...] even if they are slightly past their expiry date".

=== Retrospective reviews and accolades ===
Retrospective reviews of Those Once Loyal have been largely positive, with critics praising the album for its refinement of Bolt Thrower's sound. According to Kez Whelan, writing for The Quietus in 2021, the album displayed Bolt Thrower's "absolute mastery" of their "late-period groove", with every track being "a certified classic". In 2022, Revolver described the album as "remarkably efficient and still endlessly replayable", emphasizing how it "zeroed in on what [Bolt Thrower had] spent the last 20 years mastering — bulletproof riffs that churn like tanks rolling over stacks of bodies".

The album has also been praised by notable musicians, including Frank Watkins of Obituary, Jacob Bannon of Converge, and Riley Gale of Power Trip, who named it one of his top five metal albums of all time. Larissa Stupar of Venom Prison also listed it as one of the 10 best death metal albums of all time. In the 2016 edition of Choosing Death: The Improbable History of Death Metal & Grindcore, Albert Mudrian, founder and editor-in-chief of Decibel, selected the album as part of his book's "Essential Discography" for 2005.

Accolades for Those Once Loyal
| Publication | Country | Accolade | Year | Rank | Ref. |
|---|---|---|---|---|---|
| Terrorizer | United Kingdom | Top 100 Albums of the Decade (2000s) | 2009 | 44 | |
| Brave Words & Bloody Knuckles | Canada | Top 30 Metal Blade Releases Of All Time | 2012 | 12 | |
| Loudwire | United States | 35 Best Metal Blade Records Albums | 2017 | N/A | |
| Metal Hammer | Germany | The 500 Greatest Metal Albums of All Time | 2024 | 407 | |

== Aftermath ==
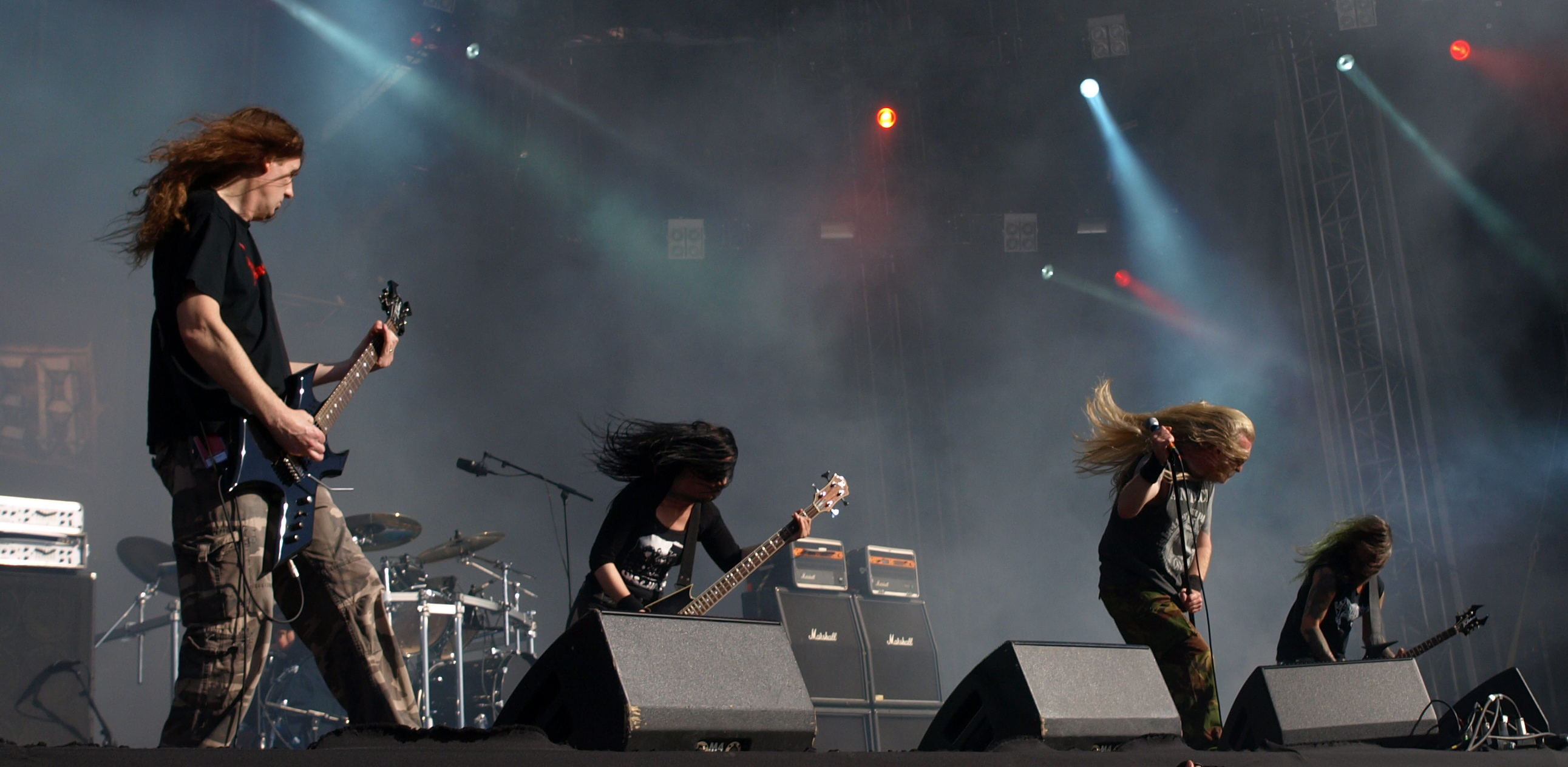
Bolt Thrower performing at the 2013 Tuska Open Air Metal Festival in Finland

Bolt Thrower began writing material for a ninth album in early 2007, and in January 2008, the band announced that they would return to Sable Rose Studios with Faulkner in the summer of 2008. According to Willetts, Bolt Thrower's "creative spark had been extinguished" and that, aside from "a few riffs", their new material did not live up to the "response and status" of Those Once Loyal. On 12 June 2008, the band announced that they had decided to "postpone [its] recording indefinitely", stating:

From day one we made it clear that we'd stop recording when we felt we'd written the ultimate Bolt Thrower album; we just never knew when that would be. We kind of took for granted that each release would get better and better. But we have realized now that our last release, Those Once Loyal, turned out to be that album, and basically the new stuff we have written just doesn't match up to it. We have a lot of pride in our back catalogue, and we refuse to turn into one of the many bands (like the ones we grew up listening to) who end up releasing crap, and we're also not prepared to compromise by instead releasing an album of cover versions or a 'best-of' album.

In a 2017 interview with Metal Hammer, Willetts stated that Bolt Thrower's decision to stop recording albums was "a brave one; we could have carried on and put something out, but in our eyes [Those Once Loyal] was the pinnacle of what we wanted to achieve, [and] we're pleased that we've left a proud legacy behind us." (Note: Despite this, Willetts did not entirely rule out the possibility of a new Bolt Thrower album until their disbandment in 2016, telling Dose of Metal in a 2011 interview: "If we get some good shit going on we'll definitely lay it down and roll with it".) According to Kim Kelly, writing for Vice in 2015, Bolt Thrower's recording hiatus allowed the band to "[bow] out with grace, sending their dead home in a closed coffin instead of propping it up listlessly on life support like so many others of their generation have seen fit to do. In refusing to betray their fans or their own principles, their discography was granted a warrior's death".

Bolt Thrower continued to tour and perform shows for the next seven years after announcing their recording hiatus, with their final performance taking place at the Rickshaw Theatre in Vancouver, Canada, on 21 June 2015. On 14 September 2015, following a band rehearsal for a planned tour of Australia, Martin Kearns died unexpectedly at the age of 38. On the first anniversary of Kearns' death in 2016, Bolt Thrower announced that they had disbanded, as "the Bolt Thrower drummer position [had been] buried with him". Shortly thereafter, Willetts confirmed to Metal Hammer that the split was permanent and that there would be "no reunion tours etc...no compromise."

Following Bolt Thrower's disbandment, Willetts formed Memoriam, after which he released his first album in 12 years, For The Fallen, in 2017. Willetts had been unable to record outside of Bolt Thrower, as the band did not permit side projects, something which gradually frustrated him: "I enjoyed playing classic songs with Bolt Thrower, but I missed that creative element of what we were doing." In a 2017 interview with Invisible Oranges, Willetts stated: "It's all well and good going out and playing gigs and turning out the same old songs over and over again, [...] but you know, ultimately it's not what being in a band should be all about. It should be about creating new music and having a good time and challenging yourself and making things happen."

== Track listing ==
All songs written by Bolt Thrower.

| No. | Title | Length |
|---|---|---|
| 1. | "At First Light" | 4:38 |
| 2. | "Entrenched" | 3:41 |
| 3. | "The Killchain" | 4:41 |
| 4. | "Granite Wall" | 4:03 |
| 5. | "Those Once Loyal" | 4:14 |
| 6. | "Anti-Tank (Dead Armour)" | 4:15 |
| 7. | "Last Stand of Humanity" | 3:10 |
| 8. | "Salvo" | 5:18 |
| 9. | "When Cannons Fade" | 5:27 |
| Total length: | | 39:32 |

Digipak edition bonus track
| No. | Title | Length |
|---|---|---|
| 10. | "A Symbol of Eight" | 4:10 |
| Total length: | | 43:33 |

== Personnel ==
Personnel per liner notes.

Bolt Thrower

- Karl Willetts – vocals
- Gavin Ward – guitars
- Barry Thomson – guitars
- Jo Bench – bass guitar
- Martin Kearns – drums

Production

- Bolt Thrower – production, mixing, arrangements
- Andy Faulkner – production, mixing, engineering

Artwork

- Levente Toth – cover and booklet photography
- Jan Meininghaus – "Chaos Eye" logo, additional artwork

== Charts ==
Chart performance for Those Once Loyal
| Chart (2005) | Peak position |
|---|---|
| German Albums (Offizielle Top 100) | 76 |

== Release history ==
Release history for Those Once Loyal
| Region | Label | Format | Date | Catalog # | Ref. |
|---|---|---|---|---|---|
| Germany | Metal Blade | CD; LP | 11 November 2005 | 3984-14506-1 (LP) 3984-14506-2 (CD) | |
| Europe | Metal Blade | CD; LP | 14 November 2005 | 3984-14506-1 (LP) 3984-14506-2 (CD) | |
| United States | Metal Blade | CD; LP | 15 November 2005 | 3984-14506-1 (LP) 3984-14506-2 (CD) | |
| Various | Metal Blade | LP | 24 October 2011 | 3984-14506-1 (LP) 3984-14506-2 (CD) | |
| Various | Metal Blade | LP | 22 January 2021 | 3984-14506-1 (LP) 3984-14506-2 (CD) | |

== Bibliography ==
- Chapman, Adam (November–December 2005). "Sentencing". Zero Tolerance. No. 8. UK: Obdurate Ltd. p. 104. ISSN 1742-9897.
- Finley, Ian (December 2005). "Bolt Thrower: Those Once Loyal". Terrorizer. No. 138. UK: Dark Arts Ltd. p. 68. ISSN 1350-6978.
- Grant, Peter (2014). "The First World War in Popular Music since 1958". In Baxter, Katherine Isobel; Einhaus, Ann-Marie (eds.). The Edinburgh Companion to the First World War and the Arts. Edinburgh: Edinburgh University Press. pp. 216–226. ISBN 978-1-4744-0163-0. ProQuest 2136043648.
- Harvie, Calum (November 2005). "Bolt From the Blue". Zero Tolerance. No. 8. UK: Obdurate Ltd. pp. 12–17. ISSN 1742-9897.
- Hoare, James (December 2009). "Critical Mass: Terrorizer Critics' Albums of the Decade". Terrorizer's Secret History (The Decade). No. 2. UK: Dark Arts Ltd. pp. 46–54.
- Mudrian, Albert (2020). Choosing Death: The Improbable History of Death Metal & Grindcore (Revised and Expanded Edition) (2nd paperback ed.). US: Bazillion Points. p. 378. ISBN 978-1-935950-16-5. ;
- Strachan, Guy (December 2005). "Back In Flak". Terrorizer. No. 138. UK: Dark Arts Ltd. pp. 14–16. ISSN 1350-6978.
