= Who Dares Wins (album) =

Compilation album by Bolt Thrower
- Released: 14 September 1998
- Recorded: 1990–1994
- Genre: Death metal
- Length: 49:42
- Label: Earache Records

Bolt Thrower chronology
Mercenary (1998)	Who Dares Wins (1998)	Honour – Valour – Pride (2001)

Professional ratings
Review scores
Source	Rating
AllMusic	3/5 stars
Kerrang!	3/5 stars
Metal Rules	3/5

Who Dares Wins is a compilation of various rare Bolt Thrower tracks from EPs and other sources: Tracks 1–4 are from the Cenotaph EP, tracks 5–8 are from the Spearhead EP and the tracks 9 and 10 are from the same session as "...For Victory", previously released on "Rareache" (the anniversary compilation boxset of Earache Records) and the Japanese version of ...For Victory. It is released on Earache Records, Mosh 208 on 14 September 1998. The cover art is also taken from the Spearhead EP.

The release coincided with the release of the album Mercenary, which was Bolt Thrower's first album for Metal Blade Records. The band have hence accused Earache of trying to cash in on the band. Also, the album was originally intended to be titled No Guts, No Glory; however because that is the title of a song on Mercenary Earache had to scrap that title. The band recommends not to buy this as they would never agree on releasing a compilation album.

== Track listing ==
All songs written by Bolt Thrower.

No.	Title	Length
1.	"Cenotaph"	4:05
2.	"Destructive Infinity"	4:14
3.	"Prophet of Hatred"	3:53
4.	"Realm of Chaos" (live)	2:46
5.	"Spearhead" (Extended Remix)	8:42
6.	"Crown of Life"	5:29
7.	"Dying Creed"	4:17
8.	"Lament"	5:37
9.	"World Eater '94"	6:09
10.	"Overlord"	4:29
Total length:		49:42

== Personnel ==
- Karl Willetts – vocals
- Gavin Ward – guitars
- Barry Thomson – guitars
- Andrew Whale – drums
- Jo Bench – bass
