= The Peel Session (Bolt Thrower EP) =

EP by Bolt Thrower
- Released: 3 January 1988
- Recorded: 1988
- Genre: Death metal
- Length: 15:10
- Label: Strange Fruit
- Producer: Dale Griffin

Bolt Thrower chronology
The Peel Session (1988)	In Battle There Is No Law (1988)

The Peel Session is a Bolt Thrower EP of their first Peel Sessions. It is released on Strange Fruit. It is produced by Dale Griffin. The EP is in its entirety included in The Peel Sessions 1988–90 (1991).

== Track listing ==
No.	Title	Length
1.	"Forgotten Existence"	3:58
2.	"Attack in the Aftermath"	3:31
3.	"Psychological Warfare"	3:27
4.	"In Battle there is no Law"	4:14
Total length:		15:10

== Personnel ==
- Alan West – vocals
- Gavin Ward – guitars
- Barry Thomson – guitars
- Andrew Whale – drums
- Jo Bench – bass
