= Mercenary (album) =

Studio album by Bolt Thrower
- Released: 10 November 1998
- Recorded: December 1997 – January 1998
- Studios: Chapel Studios, Lincoln, England
- Genre: Death metal
- Length: 46:40
- Label: Metal Blade
- Producers: Ewan Davis, Bolt Thrower

Bolt Thrower chronology
...For Victory (1994)	Mercenary (1998)	Who Dares Wins (1998)

Professional ratings
Review scores
Source	Rating
AllMusic	3/5 stars
Chronicles of Chaos	7/10
Collector's Guide to Heavy Metal	5/10
Kerrang!	3/5 stars
Metal.de	8/10
Metal Rules	5/5
Rock Hard	10/10

Mercenary is the sixth album by the British death metal band Bolt Thrower. It was recorded at Chapel Studios, Lincoln, England, December 1997 to January 1998. The album was produced by Bolt Thrower and Ewan Davis. It was released on Metal Blade Records in 1998.

The cover painting is titled "Contact – Wait Out", which is also the first track on the next album, Honour – Valour – Pride.

"Powder Burns" is a continuation of the song "Embers" from The IVth Crusade, and leads into "The Killchain" on Those Once Loyal.

This is the only album to feature Alex Thomas on drums.

== Track listing ==
- All songs written by Bolt Thrower

No.	Title	Length
1.	"Zeroed"	5:46
2.	"Laid to Waste"	4:40
3.	"Return from Chaos"	5:04
4.	"Mercenary"	5:54
5.	"To the Last ..."	5:24
6.	"Powder Burns"	4:46
7.	"Behind Enemy Lines"	5:18
8.	"No Guts, No Glory"	4:07
9.	"Sixth Chapter"	5:40
10.	"Infiltrator ¹"	4:47
Total length:		46:40

¹ Bonus track on digipak and Japanese version. The digipak edition contains 25 tracks of which tracks 10 to 24 are short tracks of silence.

== Personnel ==
Bolt Thrower

- Karl Willetts – vocals
- Gavin Ward – rhythm guitar
- Barry Thomson – rhythm and lead guitar
- Jo Bench – bass
- Alex Thomas – drums

Production & miscellaneous credits

- Arranged by Bolt Thrower
- Produced by Ewan Davies & Bolt Thrower
- Recorded & engineered by Ewan Davies, except "Powder Burns" (recorded & engineered by James Anderson)
- Peter Archer – Front cover: sketch for "Contact – Wait Out"
- Jan Meininghaus – Eye motif
- Paul McHale – Chaos skull

== Charts ==
Chart performance for Mercenary
Chart (1998)	Peak position
German Albums (Offizielle Top 100)	87
