= War (Bolt Thrower album) =

Live album by Bolt Thrower
- Released: 2010
- Recorded: Manchester, 1992
- Genre: Death metal
- Length: 46:02
- Label: Earache

Bolt Thrower chronology
Those Once Loyal (2005)	War (2010)

War is a live album by Bolt Thrower recorded in Manchester 1992, on an 8-track tape, and released in 2010. It was originally recorded by the band members in order to have some of their own live recordings for posterity. Later on Earache Records wanted to release a special edition of the ...For Victory album, thus it was packed with that album in 1994 in a limited 2CD package; i.e., they just replaced the box with a 2CD box and added the second disc. The album is sometimes known or listed as Live War.

The promo edition was labeled Mosh 124, which is a mistake, since according to the official Earache catalogue Mosh 124 is a Fudge Tunnel album.

The album was rated 3.5 out of 5 stars by MetalMusicArchives.

== Track listing ==
No.	Title	Length
1.	"The IVth Crusade"	4:46
2.	"Dying Creed"	4:36
3.	"Spearhead"	6:30
4.	"Unleashed"	5:24
5.	"Ritual"	4:32
6.	"Where Next to Conquer"	3:54
7.	"War Master"	4:29
8.	"As the World Burns"	6:48
9.	"Cenotaph"	5:03
Total length:		46:02

== Personnel ==
- Karl Willetts – vocals
- Gavin Ward – guitars
- Barry Thomson – guitars
- Andrew Whale – drums
- Jo Bench – bass
