= In Battle There Is No Law! =

Studio album by Bolt Thrower
- Released: 20 June 1988
- Recorded: Loco Studios, 1988
- Genre: Death metal, grindcore
- Length: 30:21
- Label: Vinyl Solution
- Producer: Andrew Fryer

Bolt Thrower chronology
The Peel Session (1988)	In Battle There Is No Law! (1988)	Realm of Chaos: Slaves to Darkness (1989)

In Battle There Is No Law! is the debut album by British death metal band Bolt Thrower. It was recorded at Loco studios by Andrew Fryer, and mixed at Clockwork by Alan Scott. It was released on Vinyl Solution as Sol 11 on 20 June 1988, and re-released on Vinyl Solution as Sol 11 in 1992, with a different album sleeve. The album was again re-released in 2005 with the old album sleeve restored. The sound of the album dominantly featured characteristics of grindcore, with lyrics socio-politically charged as the members had roots in crust punk, and created a sound that was heavily influenced by their roots.

German melodic death metal/metalcore act Heaven Shall Burn used the same album title for their debut EP as a homage to Bolt Thrower, claiming that the band had a huge influence on their music.

== Track listing ==
- All songs written by Bolt Thrower

No.	Title	Length
1.	"In Battle There Is No Law"	5:01
2.	"Challenge for Power"	3:34
3.	"Forgotten Existence"	3:45
4.	"Denial of Destiny"	2:30
5.	"Blind to Defeat" (CD bonus track)	2:21
6.	"Concession of Pain"	2:58
7.	"Attack in the Aftermath"	3:11
8.	"Psychological Warfare"	3:31
9.	"Nuclear Annihilation"	3:30
Total length:		30:21

== Personnel ==
Bolt Thrower

- Karl Willetts – vocals
- Gavin Ward – guitars
- Barry Thomson – guitars
- Jo Bench – bass
- Andrew Whale – drums

Technicial personnel

- Andrew Fryer – production
- Alan Scott – mixing
- Paul McHale – front cover
- Jim – additional artwork
