= The Peel Sessions 1988–90 =

Compilation album by Bolt Thrower
- Released: 26 October 1991
- Recorded: 1988–1990
- Genre: Death metal
- Length: 43:59
- Label: Strange Fruit
- Producer: Dale Griffin

Bolt Thrower chronology
War Master (1991)	The Peel Sessions 1988–90 (1991)	The IVth Crusade (1992)

The Peel Sessions 1988–90 is a Bolt Thrower album consisting of three Peel Sessions. It was released on Strange Fruit in 1991, DEI 8118–2, and recorded live in the studio. It is produced by Dale Griffin.

== Track listing ==
No.	Title	Length
1.	"Forgotten Existence"	3:58
2.	"Attack in the Aftermath"	3:31
3.	"Psychological Warfare"	3:27
4.	"In Battle There is No Law"	4:14
5.	"Drowned in Torment"	3:10
6.	"Eternal War"	2:30
7.	"Realm of Chaos"	3:03
8.	"Domination"	2:44
9.	"Destructive Infinity"	4:17
10.	"Warmaster"	4:32
11.	"After Life"	4:35
12.	"Lost Souls Domain"	3:58
Total length:		43:59

The tracks 1 to 4 are from the first Peel session. Track 5 to 8 are from their second Peel session and the last four tracks are from the last Peel session.

This is the only recording of the track "Domination". The intro of the song was later used for "Prophet of Hatred".

== Personnel ==
Bolt Thrower

- Alan West – vocals on tracks 1–4
- Karl Willetts – vocals on tracks 5–12
- Gavin Ward – guitars
- Barry Thomson – guitars
- Andrew Whale – drums
- Jo Bench – bass

Production

- Dale Griffin – producer
- Mike Walters – engineering
- Mike Engles – engineering
- F. Kay – engineering
- Don Walker – mastering
