= Karl Willetts =

English vocalist

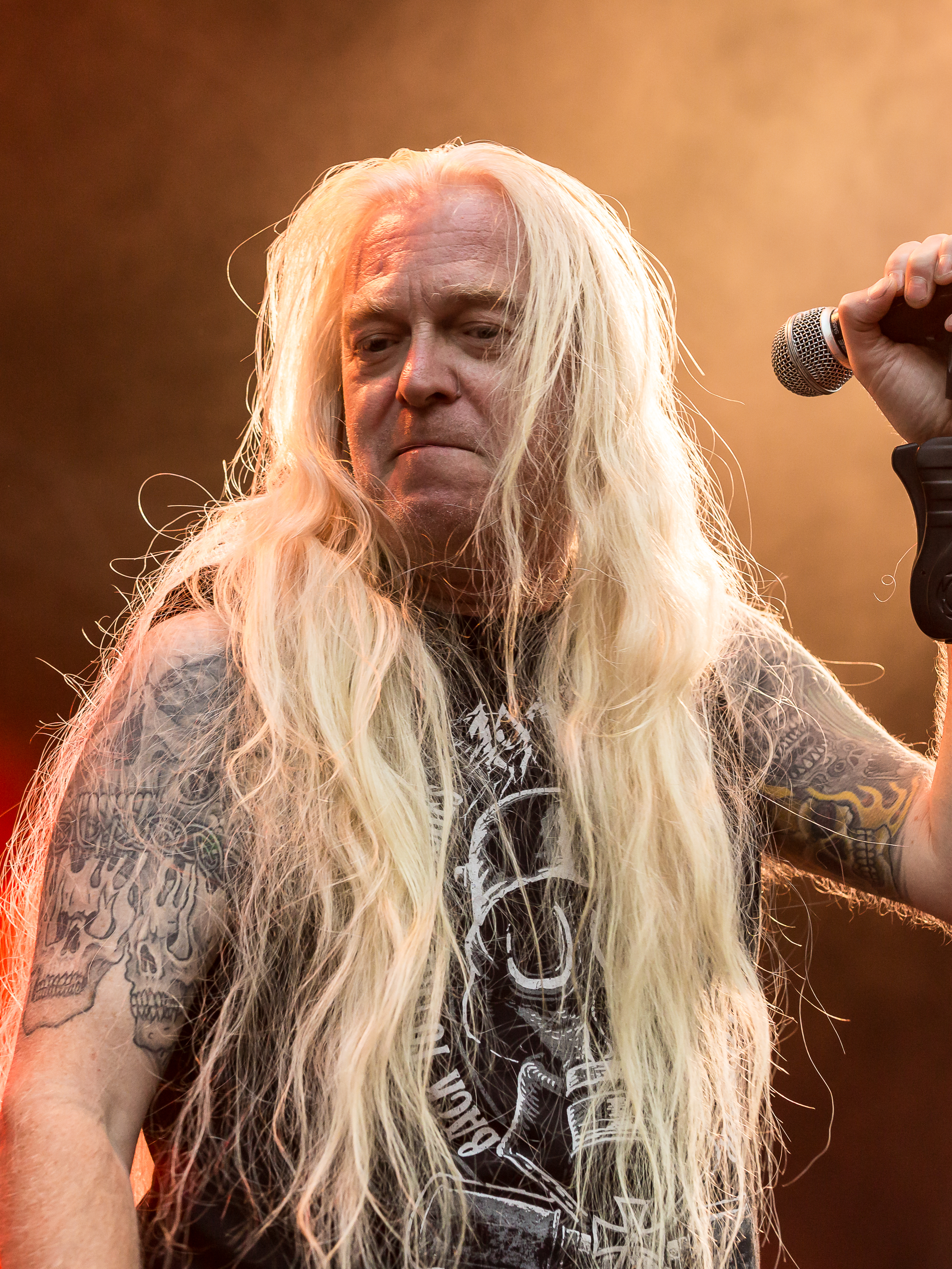
- Willetts with Memoriam in 2022

Background information
- Born: 21 September 1966 (age 59); England
- Genres: Death metal
- Occupation: Singer
- Years active: 1988–present
- Formerly of: Bolt Thrower, Memoriam

Karl Willetts (born 21 September 1966) is an English death metal vocalist, best known as the lead singer of Bolt Thrower and Memoriam.

== Biography ==
Willetts joined the British death metal band Bolt Thrower in 1988. Before that, he drove the backline of the band. He stayed with Bolt Thrower until 1994, after the recording of ...For Victory. He left the band mainly because he wanted to go back to university and finish his degree.

Willetts rejoined as a session vocalist for the recording of Mercenary and left shortly thereafter because of financial reasons and lack of commitment. In the meantime, he got a job as a salesman of insurances besides other jobs. He resides in Solihull. Rumours persisted he had returned in 2001, but he did not. However, in November 2004, he actually did re-join Bolt Thrower after the departure of Dave Ingram. Willetts now has a degree in Cultural Studies from the Birmingham University. Willetts stayed in Bolt Thrower until the band broke up in 2016, following the death of drummer Martin Kearns the year before.

Willetts also did some guest vocals with UK punk band Doom on their Peel Sessions album and UK death metal band Benediction on two accounts; one on "Jumping at Shadows" which appears on The Grand Leveller and Dark is the Season; the other on "At the Wrong Side of the Grave", which is a cover of The Accüsed and appears on the Transcend the Rubicon album.

Willetts was a vegetarian for a long while, but started eating meat prior to 2006.

== Discography ==
=== Bolt Thrower ===
- In Battle There Is No Law! (1988)
- Realm of Chaos (1989)
- Cenotaph (1991)
- War Master (1991)
- The Peel Sessions 1988–90 (1991)
- The IVth Crusade (1992)
- Spearhead (1993)
- ...For Victory (1994)
- War (1994)
- Mercenary (1998)
- Who Dares Wins (1998)
- Those Once Loyal (2005)

=== Memoriam ===
- For the Fallen (2017)
- The Silent Vigil (2018)
- Requiem for Mankind (2019)
- To the End (2021)
- Rise to Power (2023)

=== H Drive Project ===
- H Drive Project (2022)
