= Honour – Valour – Pride =

Studio album by Bolt Thrower
- Released: 19 November 2001
- Recorded: July–September 2001
- Studio: Sable Rose (Coventry)
- Genre: Death metal
- Length: 45:37
- Label: Metal Blade
- Producer: Andy Faulkner

Bolt Thrower chronology
Who Dares Wins (1998)	Honour – Valour – Pride (2001)	Those Once Loyal (2005)

Professional ratings
Review scores
Source	Rating
AllMusic	3/5 stars
Blabbermouth.net	4/10
Chronicles of Chaos	7/10
Collector's Guide to Heavy Metal	7/10
Metal.de	9/10
Metal Rules	4.7/5
Rock Hard	10/10

Honour – Valour – Pride is the seventh album by the British death metal band Bolt Thrower. It was released in Europe on 19 November 2001, and in the United States on 15 January 2002. It was recorded and mixed at Sable Rose Studios in Coventry, June to September 2001. It was produced by the band and Andy Faulkner, and was released on Metal Blade Records in 2001. Honour – Valour – Pride is the only full length Bolt Thrower album not featuring Karl Willetts, and subsequently also their only album featuring Dave Ingram. It is the first with Martin Kearns on drums.

== Track listing ==
All songs written by Bolt Thrower.

No.	Title	Length
1.	"Contact – Wait Out"	5:58
2.	"Inside the Wire"	4:23
3.	"Honour"	5:21
4.	"Suspect Hostile"	4:46
5.	"7th Offensive"	6:25
6.	"Valour"	4:02
7.	"K-Machine"	4:35
8.	"A Hollow Truce"	3:19
9.	"Pride"	6:41
Total length:		45:37

Digipak edition bonus track
No.	Title	Length
10.	"Covert Ascension"	4:49

== Personnel ==
Bolt Thrower

- Dave Ingram – vocals
- Gavin Ward – guitars
- Barry Thomson – guitars
- Martin Kearns – drums
- Jo Bench – bass

Production

- Axel Jusseit – live photography
- Andy Faulkner – producer
- Jan Meininghaus – artwork, layout

== Charts ==
Chart performance for Honour – Valour – Pride
Chart (2001)	Peak position
German Albums (Offizielle Top 100)	89
