= Down Among the Dead Men =

Down Among the Dead Men may refer to:

== Literature ==
- Down Among the Dead Men, a 1954 story by William Tenn
- Down Among the Dead Men, a 1982 novelette by Gardner Dozois and Jack Dann
- Down Among the Dead Men, a 1993 book by Dave Morris
- Down Among the Dead Men a 1993 book, by Simon R. Green
- "Down Among the Dead Men", a 2004 storyline in The Sensational Spider-Man (vol. 2)
- "Down Among the Dead Men", a 2005 storyline in Astonishing X-Men: Gambit
- Down Among the Dead Men, a 2010 novel by Robert Gregory Browne
- Down Among the Dead Men, a fictional book by the character Bernice Summerfield in the Dr. Who novels
- Down Among the Dead Men, a 1933 autobiography and essays by composer Bernard van Dieren

== Music ==
- Down Among the Dead Men (band), a Swedish/Danish death metal musical project
- "Down Among the Dead Men" (song), a traditional song
- "Down Among the Dead Men", a song by Flash and the Pan from the 1979 album Flash and the Pan
- Down Among the Deadmen, a 2000 album by The Lord Weird Slough Feg

== Television ==
- "Down Among the Dead Men", an episode Diagnosis: Murder
- Down Among the Dead Men (Bugs), a 1995 episode
- "Down Among the Dead Men", a 2006 episode of Midsomer Murders

== See also ==
- Down Among the Z Men, a 1952 film
