= Who Dares Wins (disambiguation) =

"Who Dares Wins" is the motto of several special forces elite units worldwide.

Who Dares Wins may also refer to:

== Film and TV ==
- Who Dares Wins (film), a 1982 British action film on the SAS
- Who Dares Wins (TV series), a British comedy sketch show broadcast between 1983 and 1988
- Who Dares Wins (Australian game show), broadcast between 1996 and 1998
- Who Dares Wins (British game show), broadcast from 2007
- SAS: Who Dares Wins, broadcast from 2015
- SAS Australia: Who Dares Wins, broadcast from 2020

== Music ==
=== Albums ===
- He Who Dares Wins (Live at the Warehouse Leeds) (1981), by Theatre of Hate
- He Who Dares Wins Live in Berlin (1982), by Theatre of Hate
- Who Dares Wins (album), by Bolt Thrower

=== Songs ===
- "Who Dares Wins", on Original Pirate Material by The Streets
- "Who Dares Wins", on Classical Gas (Tommy Emmanuel album)
- "Who Dares Wins", by Ian Cussick in 1986
- "Who Dares Wins", by René Froger in 1988

== Other uses ==
- Who Dares Wins (video game), a 1985 video game by Alligata Software
- Who Dares Wins, a book on Britain from 1979 to 1982 by Dominic Sandbrook
