= Cenotaph (EP) =

EP by Bolt Thrower
- Released: 14 January 1991
- Recorded: Slaughterhouse Studios, September 1990; July 1989; Kilburn National, 16 November 1989
- Genre: Death metal
- Length: 14:49
- Label: Earache
- Producer: Colin Richardson

Bolt Thrower chronology
Realm of Chaos – Slaves to Darkness (1989)	Cenotaph (1991)	War Master (1991)

Cenotaph is an EP by British death metal band Bolt Thrower. Tracks 1 and 2 were recorded at Slaughterhouse studios in September 1990, track 3 was recorded at Slaugherhouse studios in July 1989. All three were produced by Colin Richardson and Bolt Thrower. Track 4 was recorded live at Kilburn National on 16 November 1989. It is a rough audience recording, "[...] that we feel captures the atmosphere of the Grindcrusher Tour". It was released on Earache: Mosh 33 in 1990 and has been deleted.

== Track listing ==
- All songs written by Bolt Thrower

No.	Title	Length
1.	"Cenotaph"	4:00
2.	"Destructive Infinity"	4:14
3.	"Prophet of Hatred"	3:51
4.	"Realm of Chaos" (live)	2:44
Total length:		14:49

== Personnel ==
- Karl Willetts – vocals
- Gavin Ward – guitars
- Barry Thomson – guitars
- Andrew Whale – drums
- Jo Bench – bass
