= Down Among the Dead Men (band) =

- Also known as: DATDM
- Origin: Scandinavia
- Genres: Death metal, crust punk
- Years active: 2013–present
- Label: Cyclone Empire
- Members: Dave Ingram; Rogga Johansson; Dennis Blomberg
- Past members: Brynjar Helgetun

Down Among the Dead Men is a Swedish/Danish death metal band. Formed by lead vocalist Dave Ingram (Benediction, ex-Bolt Thrower, ex-Hail of Bullets) and guitarist Rogga Johansson (Paganizer, Ribspreader, Revolting, etc.). Their musical style has been specified as "crust-riddled punk with a definite death metal edge".

== Band members ==
Current members

- Dave Ingram - vocals (2013–present)
- Rogga Johansson - guitar, bass (2013–present)
- Dennis Blomberg - guitar (2013–present)

Former members

- Brynjar Helgetun - drums (2013)

Tour members

- Matthias Fiebig - drums (2013–present)

== Discography ==
Studio albums

- Down Among the Dead Men (2013)
- Exterminate! Annihilate! Destroy! (2015)
- …And You Will Obey Me (2018)
