= Spearhead (album) =

EP by Bolt Thrower
- Released: 7 December 1992
- Recorded: 1992
- Genre: Death-doom
- Length: 24:06
- Label: Earache
- Producer: Colin Richardson

Bolt Thrower chronology
The IVth Crusade (1992)	Spearhead (1992)	...For Victory (1994)

Spearhead is an EP by the British death metal band Bolt Thrower. It was recorded at Sawmill Studios, produced by Colin Richardson and Bolt Thrower, engineered by John Cornfield, mixed at Fon Studios in September 1992, engineered by Alan Fisch and Steve Harris. It was released on Earache Records: Mosh 73 in December 1992.

== Track listing ==
All songs written by Bolt Thrower.

No.	Title	Length
1.	"Spearhead (Extended Remix)"	8:44
2.	"Crown of Life"	5:28
3.	"Dying Creed"	4:17
4.	"Lament"	5:36
Total length:		24:06

== Personnel ==
- Karl Willetts – vocals
- Gavin Ward – guitars
- Barry Thomson – guitars
- Andrew Whale – drums
- Jo Bench – bass
