= Realm of Chaos (album) =

Studio album by Bolt Thrower
- Released: 28 October 1989
- Recorded: Loco Studios, April 1989
- Genre: Death metal
- Length: 38:12
- Label: Earache, Relativity
- Producer: Digby Pearson and Bolt Thrower

Bolt Thrower chronology
In Battle There Is No Law (1988)	Realm of Chaos (1989)	Cenotaph (1990)

Professional ratings
Review scores
Source	Rating
AllMusic	2.5/5 stars

Realm of Chaos: Slaves to Darkness is the second studio album by British death metal band Bolt Thrower, released on 28 October 1989. It was recorded at Loco Studios in April 1989 and engineered by Tim Lewis. It was mixed at Slaughterhouse Studios in July 1989 and engineered by Colin Richardson. It is produced by Bolt Thrower and Digby Pearson. The cover artwork was produced by Games Workshop. The whole album is closely tied to Games Workshop's Warhammer 40,000 game background and Realm of Chaos: Slaves to Darkness was the title of a gaming book by Games Workshop released in 1988.

The album was released on Earache Records: Mosh 13 in 1989. In 2005 a re-issue was released by Earache, featuring new artwork. The band advises not to buy the re-issue, as they have not been involved and will not get royalties.

Realm of Chaos displays a progression from its previous output in speed and riffage. There is a strong focus on blast beats in many of the songs, with chaotic guitar soloing. Nevertheless, the signature heavy riffing is also apparent.

== Track listing ==
- All songs written by Bolt Thrower.

No.	Title	Length
1.	"Intro"	1:17
2.	"Eternal War"	2:08
3.	"Through the Eye of Terror"	4:22
4.	"Dark Millennium"	2:59
5.	"All that Remains"	4:39
6.	"Lost Souls Domain"	4:13
7.	"Plague Bearer"	2:54
8.	"World Eater"	4:55
9.	"Drowned in Torment"	3:04
10.	"Realm of Chaos"	2:50
11.	"Prophet of Hatred" (CD bonus track)	3:52
12.	"Outro"	0:59
Total length:		38:12

== Personnel ==
Bolt Thrower

- Karl Willetts – vocals
- Gavin Ward – guitars
- Barry Thomson – guitars
- Andrew Whale – drums
- Jo Bench – bass

Production

- Digby Pearson – production
- Colin Richardson – mix
- John Blanche – art direction
- Dave Lund – graphic design
- John Sibbick – front cover artwork
- Addy Jones – photography
