= Scriptures (Benediction album) =

Studio album by Benediction
- Released: 16 October 2020
- Recorded: 2020
- Studio: Grindstone
- Genre: Death metal
- Length: 46:56
- Label: Nuclear Blast
- Producer: Scott Atkins

Benediction chronology
Killing Music (2008)	Scriptures (2020)

Professional ratings
Review scores
Source	Rating
Metal Hammer	4.5/5 stars
New Noise Magazine	5/5 stars

Scriptures is the eighth studio album by British death metal band Benediction, released on October 16, 2020 on Nuclear Blast. It is the band's first studio album in 12 years and marks the return of former vocalist Dave Ingram. Originally scheduled for May 2020, the album's release was pushed back to August due to the COVID-19 pandemic before being rescheduled again to October.

Three music videos were released, for the tracks "Rabid Carnality", "Stormcrow", and "Iterations of I" respectively.

== Track listing ==
No.	Title	Length
1.	"Iterations of I"	4:15
2.	"Scriptures in Scarlet"	3:26
3.	"The Crooked Man"	3:53
4.	"Stormcrow"	3:07
5.	"Progenitors of a New Paradigm (feat. Kam Lee)"	5:25
6.	"Rabid Carnality"	2:45
7.	"In Our Hands, The Scars"	4:36
8.	"Tear Off These Wings"	4:20
9.	"Embrace the Kill"	2:58
10.	"Neverwhen"	4:10
11.	"The Blight at the End"	3:13
12.	"We Are Legion"	4:49

== Personnel ==
- Darren Brookes – guitar
- Peter Rew – guitar
- Dave Ingram – vocals
- Dan Bate – bass
- Giovanni Durst – drums
