= Alex Thomas =

British drummer

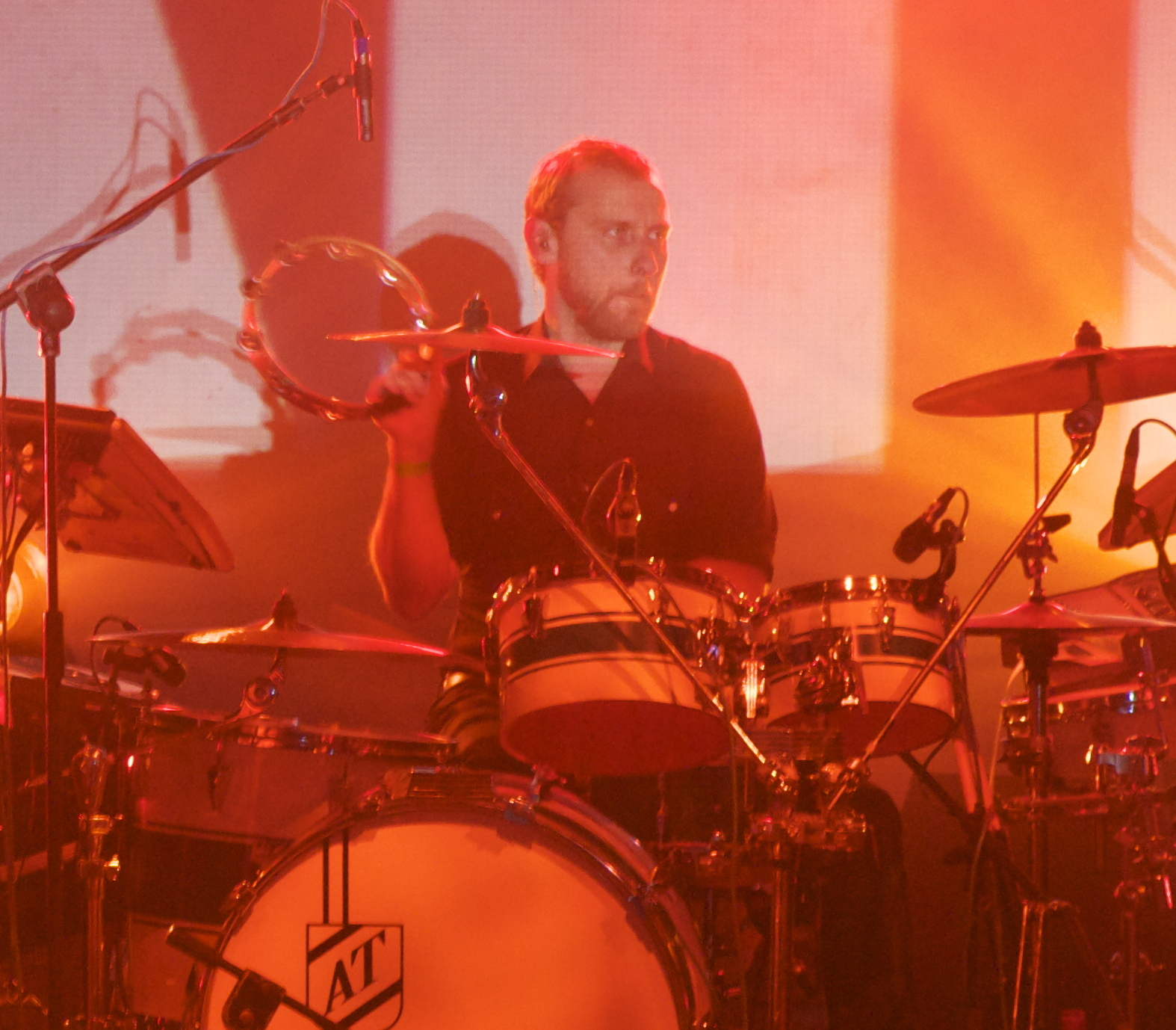
- Thomas performing in 2010

Background information
- Born: 10 October 1978 (age 47); Lutterworth, Leicestershire, England
- Genres: Alternative rock, pop rock, death metal, doom metal
- Occupation: Drummer
- Member of: Squarepusher, Air, Anna Calvi, With the Dead
- Formerly of: Bolt Thrower, John Cale

Alex Thomas (born 10 October 1978) is an English drummer who performs with Squarepusher and Air. He also performed with John Cale (2012–2013, 2023).

Thomas joined Bolt Thrower in August 1997. He played drums on Mercenary and the Into the Killing Zone tour, then left the band in 2000 due to lack of interest in the musical direction that Bolt Thrower were taking.

He has also played with Badly Drawn Boy, Groop Dogdrill, New Young Pony Club, UNKLE, Saint Etienne, Bat for Lashes, played guitar with Fridge and, under the name Earl Shilton, he has released the album Two Rooms (Full of Insects) on the Invisible Spies record label.

In May 2008, Natasha Khan announced the new Bat for Lashes live line-up in advance of her support slot on the Radiohead 2008 European tour. "The Blue Dreams" includes Thomas.

As of 2018, Thomas has been playing with Anna Calvi, appearing on her album Hunter. In September 2019, Thomas was welcomed in to the Zildjian Family of worldwide artists.

== Selected discography ==
- Bolt Thrower – Mercenary (1998)
- Earl Shilton – Two Rooms Full of Insects (2003)
- Badly Drawn Boy – One Plus One Is One (2004)
- Adem – Love and Other Planets (2006)
- Badly Drawn Boy – Born in the U.K. (2006)
- Supreme Vagabond Craftsman – Just You, Me and the Baby (2006)
- Bat for Lashes – Two Suns (2009)
- Philip Selway – Running Blind EP (2011)
- Air – Le Voyage Dans La Lune (2012)
- John Cale – M:FANS (2016)
- Bloc Party – Hymns (2016)
- Anna Calvi – Hunter (2018)
