= War Master =

Studio album by Bolt Thrower
- Released: 4 February 1991
- Recorded: Slaughterhouse Studios, September 1990
- Genre: Death metal
- Length: 46:03
- Label: Earache, Combat
- Producer: Colin Richardson

Bolt Thrower chronology
Cenotaph (1991)	War Master (1991)	The Peel Sessions 1988–90 (1991)

Professional ratings
Review scores
Source	Rating
AllMusic	4.5/5 stars
NME	8/10
Record-Journal	C+

War Master is the third studio album by British death metal band Bolt Thrower. It was recorded at Slaughterhouse studios in September 1990 and produced by Bolt Thrower and Colin Richardson. It was released on Earache Records: Mosh 29 in 1991.

Whereas Realm of Chaos was dominated by grindcore based blasts and riffs, this album abandons most of the grindcore influences for a sound that is more strictly death metal. Moreover, there is more melody in the music and the guitar solos, although some chaotic solos remain. This is also the final Bolt Thrower album to feature the blast beat style of drumming (which can be heard on four songs – "Unleashed (Upon Mankind)", "What Dwells Within", "War Master", and "Afterlife"), before it was abandoned and subsequently never used thereafter in the Bolt Thrower discography.

"Cenotaph" is a thematic continuation of the song "World Eater" from the previous record. The closing riff from "World Eater" is the same as the opening riff from "Cenotaph" and also used in "Embers" from The IVth Crusade, "Powder Burns" from Mercenary and "The Killchain" from Those Once Loyal.

The album was extensively sampled on Dutch breakcore producer Bong-Ra's album Full Metal Racket, with allusions also including song titles such as "Bloody Cenotaph" and "Jo Bench".

== Critical reception ==
Alex Henderson of AllMusic gave the album four and a half stars out of five. He wrote: "Despite Bolt Thrower's limitations, this is a CD that seasoned thrash fans will find invigorating."

== Track listing ==
All songs written by Bolt Thrower.

No.	Title	Length
1.	"Intro... Unleashed (Upon Mankind)"	6:13
2.	"What Dwells Within"	4:18
3.	"The Shreds of Sanity"	3:26
4.	"Profane Creation"	5:32
5.	"Destructive Infinity" (CD bonus track)	4:14
6.	"Final Revelation"	3:55
7.	"Cenotaph"	4:03
8.	"War Master"	4:17
9.	"Rebirth of Humanity"	4:01
10.	"Afterlife"	5:59
Total length:		46:03

== Personnel ==
Bolt Thrower

- Karl Willetts – vocals
- Gavin Ward – guitars
- Barry Thomson – guitars
- Andrew Whale – drums
- Jo Bench – bass

Production

- Luton Sinfield – photography
- Pete Knifton & Ian Cooke at Maxjo Graphics – artwork and design
- Colin Richardson – production, recording
