= ...For Victory =

Studio album by Bolt Thrower
- Released: 24 November 1994
- Recorded: August 1994
- Genre: Death metal
- Length: 39:35
- Label: Earache
- Producer: Colin Richardson

Bolt Thrower chronology
Spearhead (1992)	...For Victory (1994)	Mercenary (1998)

Professional ratings
Review scores
Source	Rating
AllMusic	4.5/5 stars
Collector's Guide to Heavy Metal	6/10
Kerrang!	2/5 stars
Select	3/5 stars

...For Victory is the fifth album by British death metal band Bolt Thrower. It was recorded at Sawmill studios in 1994, produced by Colin Richardson and Bolt Thrower. A limited edition contains a live CD titled Live War.

The song "...For Victory" contains a quote from Laurence Binyon poem, known as the Ode of Remembrance.

This would be the last release with Andrew Whale on drums.

== Track listing ==
All songs written by Bolt Thrower.

No.	Title	Length
1.	"War"	1:16
2.	"Remembrance"	3:42
3.	"When Glory Beckons"	3:59
4.	"...For Victory"	4:50
5.	"Graven Image"	3:59
6.	"Lest We Forget"	4:37
7.	"Silent Demise"	3:54
8.	"Forever Fallen"	3:47
9.	"Tank (Mk.I)"	4:15
10.	"Armageddon Bound"	5:13
Total length:		39:35

Japanese edition bonus tracks
No.	Title	Length
11.	"World Eater '94"	6:11
12.	"Overlord"	4:36
Total length:		50:22

== Personnel ==
Bolt Thrower

- Karl Willetts – vocals
- Gavin Ward – guitars
- Barry Thomson – guitars
- Andrew Whale – drums
- Jo Bench – bass

Production

- John Cornfield – engineering
- Colin Richardson – producer
