= Bolt Thrower =

English death metal band

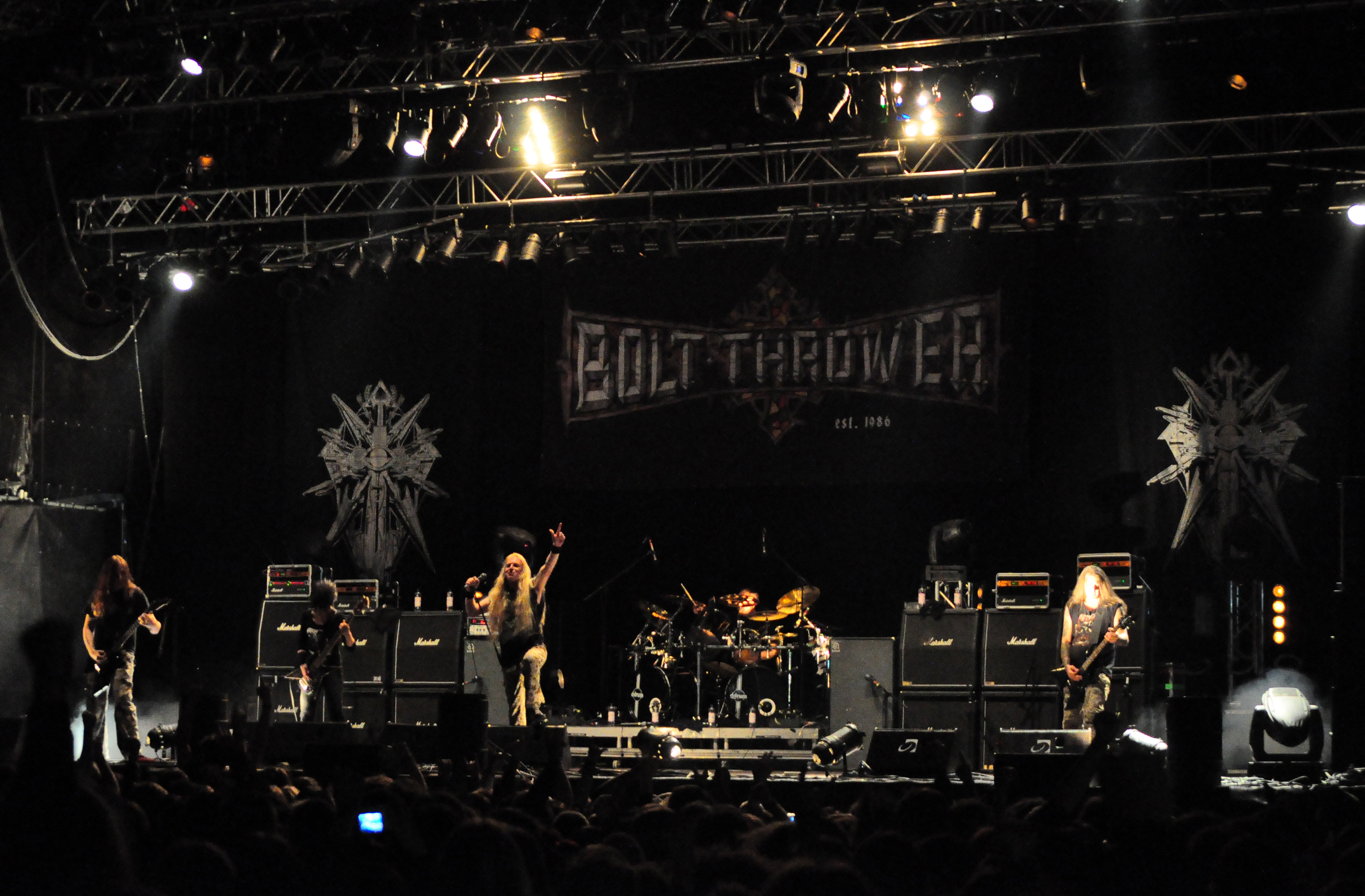
- Bolt Thrower performing in Germany in 2012

Background information
- Origin: Coventry, England
- Genres: Death metal; deathgrind (early)
- Years active: 1986–2016
- Labels: Vinyl Solution; Earache; Metal Blade; Combat; Relativity
- Spinoffs: Memoriam
- Past members: See below
- Website: boltthrower.com

Bolt Thrower were a British death metal band from Coventry, England. They formed in 1986 and released their first album with Vinyl Solution in 1988. The band moved to Earache Records and became one of the label's best-selling bands. Their last label was Metal Blade Records. The band had a succession of members and toured Europe, the United States, and Australia. Over the course of their 30-year career, Bolt Thrower released eight studio albums, three EPs, one live album, three compilation albums and two demos. Their albums have sold over 100,000 copies in the United States as of 2005.

Following the release of their eighth album, Those Once Loyal (2005), Bolt Thrower announced an indefinite hiatus from recording in June 2008, although they continued to tour until drummer Martin Kearns's death on 14 September 2015 and their subsequent disbandment in 2016, on the first anniversary of his death.

Bolt Thrower have been called "one of Britain's most consistent and enduring death metal bands."

== History ==
=== Early history (1986–1988) ===
Bolt Thrower were formed in September 1986, influenced by bands such as Slayer, Crass and Discharge. Bassist Gavin Ward and guitarist Barry Thomson founded the band in a Coventry pub toilet during a hardcore punk show. Shortly thereafter, Andrew Whale and Alan West joined on drums and vocals, respectively. They recorded the In Battle There Is No Law demo in April 1987.

Their second recording was the Concession of Pain demo, which they made in September 1987. Ward had switched to guitars and they recruited bassist Alex Tweedy. Tweedy did not show up for the recording, and Ward played guitar and bass for the demo. Two weeks after the recording session, Ward's girlfriend Jo Bench replaced Tweedy.

This line-up recorded their first Peel session on 3 January 1988 with John Peel, the alternative disk jockey of BBC Radio One. He had received their second demo and became enthusiastic about the band. They recorded four tracks for it, resulting in a deal with Vinyl Solution to release one album. Before recording their first full-length album, they replaced their singer with their driver, Karl Willetts. Their debut LP, In Battle There Is No Law, is only a half hour long and reflects their early crust punk and grindcore influences.

=== Rise to popularity and departures of Karl Willetts and Andy Whale (1989–1994) ===
The cover of the 1989 album Realm of Chaos, which uses John Sibbick's cover artwork from Warhammer 40,000: Rogue Trader, the first edition of Warhammer 40,000

They were unsatisfied with the deal with Vinyl Solution, as it was a pure hardcore label at that time. The label did little to promote Bolt Thrower, and their blend of death metal and hardcore punk was unorthodox at the time. After one album, Bolt Thrower left Vinyl Solution and signed with Earache Records. Earache Records had already signed other death metal bands including Carcass and Napalm Death. The artwork for their second album was created by John Sibbick under contract for Games Workshop for the Warhammer 40,000 rulebook released in 1987. After Games Workshop heard the recording of the songs for Bolt Thrower's second Peel session, recorded on 6 November 1988, they offered to supply the artwork for Bolt Thrower's album, which the band accepted. The record was released in 1989, titled Realm of Chaos: Slaves to Darkness, after the 1988 book of the same name published by Games Workshop. Most of the lyrics were influenced by the game, but not because of the deal with Games Workshop. Willetts, Whale, and Ward were fans of the Games Workshop role playing game, Warhammer 40,000. The band wrote a couple of songs about these games, including "Plague Bearer" and "World Eater". After the recording of Realm of Chaos, they went on the 'Grindcrusher Tour' with labelmates Napalm Death, Carcass and Morbid Angel. The Cenotaph EP, released in 1991, includes the song "Realm of Chaos", recorded during this tour.

Bolt Thrower toured Europe with Autopsy and Pestilence on the "Blood Brothers tour" in 1990.

They recorded their third and final Peel session on 22 July 1990. These three songs from the upcoming album were performed in raw versions, as well as "Lost Souls Domain" from Realm of Chaos. Bolt Thrower's next album, War Master, was recorded at Slaughterhouse Studios, which burnt down two weeks after the recordings were completed. Games Workshop offered to do their artwork. Bolt Thrower declined because it was too expensive. The former head designer of Games Workshop did the artwork, which was similar to that of Realm of Chaos. During the US tour to promote the War Master album, they used an old US school bus as a tour bus, loaded with computer games. All three Peel sessions were released on one CD named The Peel Sessions 1988–90 in 1991.

The album The IVth Crusade followed. The title has a double meaning. It was their fourth studio album (not counting the Peel sessions), and it refers to the Fourth Crusade and the capture of Constantinople. The cover artwork is a painting from Eugène Delacroix, showing "The Entry of the Crusaders in Constantinople".

They wrote slower, heavier, and more bombastic songs, leaning towards doom metal influenced by bands like Candlemass, combined with their own death metal sound. The album was followed by the tour 'World Crusade' with Polish death metal act Vader and Swedish death metal band Grave in Europe. The band toured the US and Australia. During this time, the single "Spearhead" was released, containing a heavy, extended remix of the CD track "Spearhead", plus two new tracks and "Dying Creed" off the new album.

Their next album was called ...For Victory, released in 1994. It was the final album with Karl Willetts and Andrew Whale. Both left the band because of changing life directions. The latest American tour did not go well. They returned home prematurely, fed-up with touring. A limited edition of the album exists containing a bonus live CD, called War (sometimes called Live War). After the album was released, Willetts was replaced with former Pestilence singer Martin van Drunen, and Martin "Kiddie" Kearns took over drums.

=== More line-up changes, Mercenary and Honour – Valour – Pride (1995–2003) ===
In 1995 and 1996, they went on two European tours. In 1997, Martin van Drunen left the band as he felt that he was never really a part of Bolt Thrower, and because he had a disease that made his hair fall out and made him insecure on stage. For at least one show in Germany, Dave Ingram stood in. Kearns also left the band. The drummer position was taken by Alex Thomas. Willetts temporarily rejoined the band to do vocals on their next album. The band switched record labels from Earache to Metal Blade Records, because of a lack of success with Earache since the US ...For Victory tour. Earache wanted to get rid of them and Bolt Thrower wanted to leave Earache, so they parted company.

The album Mercenary was released on 8 September 1998 in Europe and on 10 November 1998 in the US and features nine tracks. It is slower than its predecessors, but heavy and sounds like classic Bolt Thrower. Willetts returned to performing his previous style of singing. The hardcore punk influences disappeared again. After the album recording, Willetts left again and the band recruited Ingram permanently after he left Benediction.

In November 1998, Earache Records released Who Dares Wins, a compilation featuring various older recordings, including the Spearhead and Cenotaph EPs. The band members did not approve of the compilation's release and warned not to buy it, considering it a cheap cash-in from Earache. Originally, it was titled No Guts - No Glory, but the title was changed because one song on Mercenary had the same title and Metal Blade Records objected. Following the release of Mercenary, the band embarked on a European tour called Into the Killing Zone with Ingram on vocals. Thomas departed because he lacked interest in Bolt Thrower's musical direction.

After a five-date European tour in 2001, they started to work on a new album. Honour - Valour - Pride was released in Europe on 19 November 2001, and in the United States on 15 January 2002 on Metal Blade Records, and shows a progression from the direction taken on Mercenary. It contains nine tracks; the digipak includes one bonus track. Kearns returned to the band after he settled his personal life.

=== Reunion with Karl Willetts and Those Once Loyal (2004–2014) ===
In 2004, the band began working on new material for their latest album. They intended to record it in May 2004, with the release set to the end of the year by Metal Blade. Meanwhile, a European tour and a US tour were being prepared. Dave Ingram left the band due to health and personal issues before the recording could begin. This postponed the new record and tours, and the priority was finding a new singer. On 18 November 2004, the band announced the return of Karl Willetts. Recording of the album, Those Once Loyal, started in May 2005. It was released on 11 November in Germany, 14 November in the rest of Europe and 15 November in the United States, 2005. It was met with critical acclaim from magazines such as Rock Sound, Rock Hard and Metal Hammer. A European tour followed in January and February 2006. A second leg followed in April, with dates in Scandinavia, the UK, Spain and more.

Bolt Thrower announced that, dissatisfied with the Those Once Loyal album, they would indefinitely postpone the recording of another LP. The band stated that their goal was always to stop after releasing "the perfect Bolt Thrower album". However, Karl Willetts had mentioned work on a ninth album.

Since releasing Those Once Loyal, Earache has released a remastered edition of the 1989 album Realm of Chaos featuring alternate artwork by John Sibbick, the artist responsible for the original artwork of the Warhammer 40,000 Rogue Trader cover and Realm of Chaos - Slaves to Darkness. The band encouraged people not to buy it as, like Who Dares Wins, it was released without their input or consent. Furthermore, the band alleged that they had not received royalties from Earache for a number of years.

=== Death of Martin Kearns and disbandment (2015–2016) ===
Martin Kearns, Bolt Thower's drummer from 1994 to 1997 and again since 2000, died at the age of 38 on 14 September 2015. As a result, Bolt Thrower went on hiatus and cancelled their upcoming Australian tour, which would have been their first since 1993.

On 14 September 2016, the first anniversary of Kearns' death, Bolt Thrower announced on their website that they would not continue, explaining, "We spent over 20 years together, touring the world, with 3 different vocalists, but he was so much more than just a drummer to us. So when we carried his coffin to his final resting place, the Bolt Thrower drummer position was buried with him. He was, and will now forever remain THE Bolt Thrower drummer, our Powerhouse and friend Martin 'Kiddie' Kearns." Rumours of the band's break-up were confirmed two days later by frontman Karl Willetts, stating, "I can confirm that Bolt Thrower are definitely over for good. There will be no reunion tours etc... no compromise."

=== Aftermath and reunion rumours (2017–present) ===
On 7 March 2017, which would have been Kearns' 40th birthday, Bolt Thrower posted a statement on their website suggesting that a reunion or possibly a new release in memory of him was in the works. Since then, neither has materialised.

== Musical style and influences ==
Bolt Thrower have been characterised as a death metal band, and their style has remained mostly unchanged throughout their career. The band's lyrics are influenced by tabletop role-playing game game Warhammer 40,000.

== Legacy ==
Eduardo Rivadavia of AllMusic wrote: "One of Britain's most consistent and enduring death metal bands, Birmingham's Bolt Thrower has weathered the best and worst of times in the extreme genre's history without ever giving in to commercial temptations, or hardly even altering its sound. The fact that they were unusually blessed with a steady lineup throughout much of their career no doubt contributed to this stability, and though they were rarely bestowed wild praise for their efforts, with most of their competitors or contemporaries either adopting other styles or long retired, Bolt Thrower has gradually established itself as one of the best death metal bands ever to emerge from England."

== Members ==
Bolt Thrower in 2013

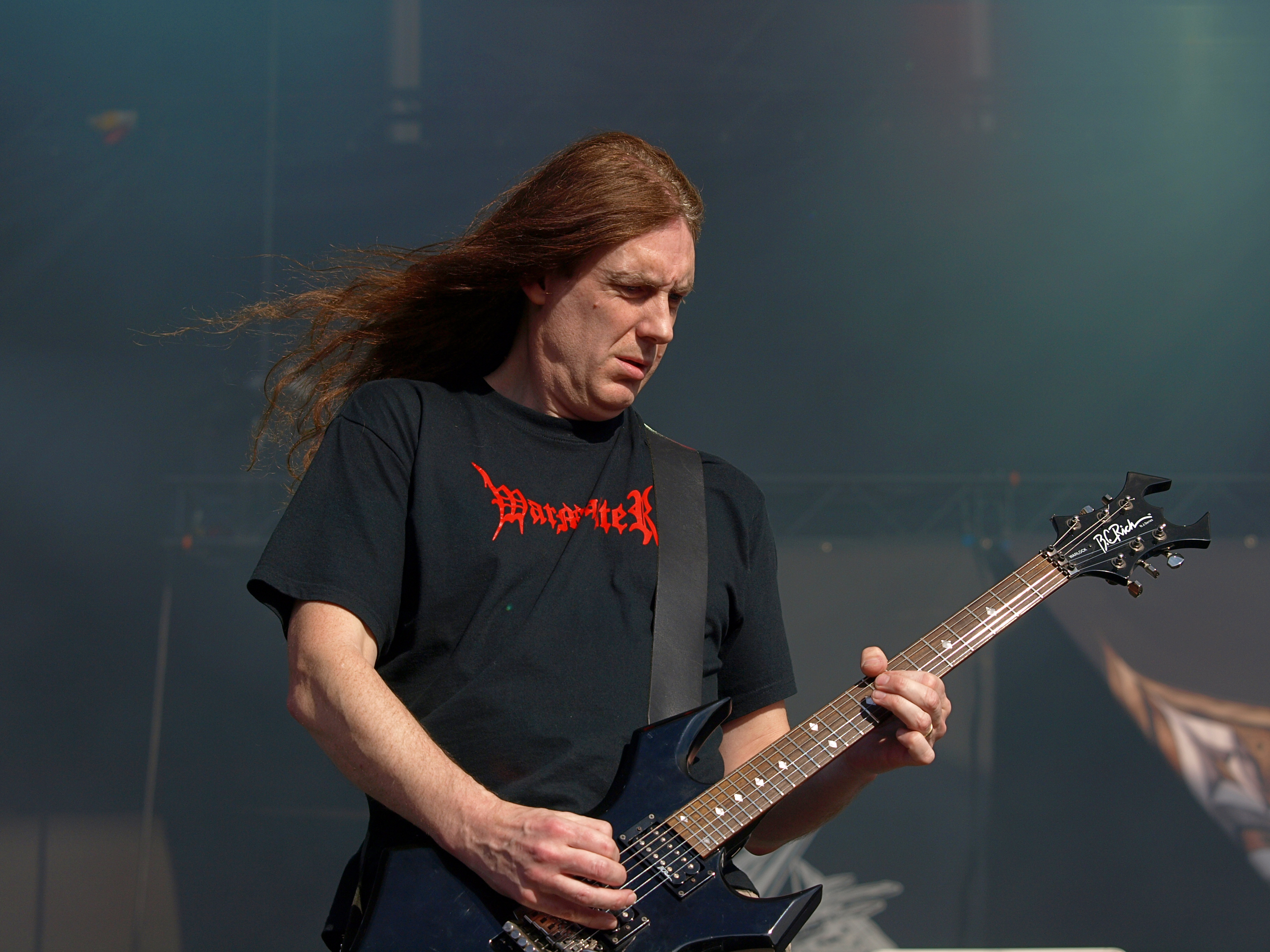
Barry Thomson

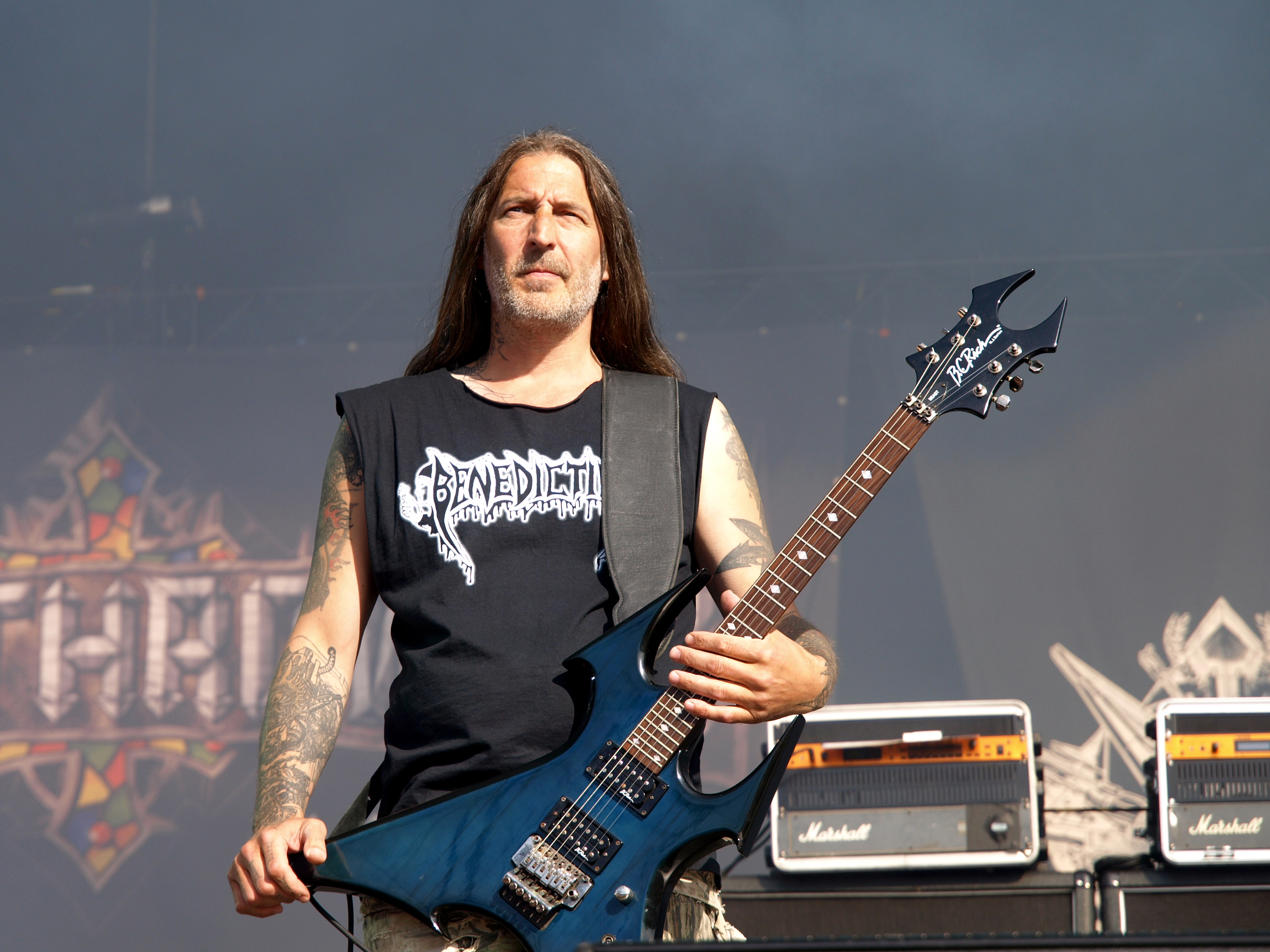
Gavin Ward

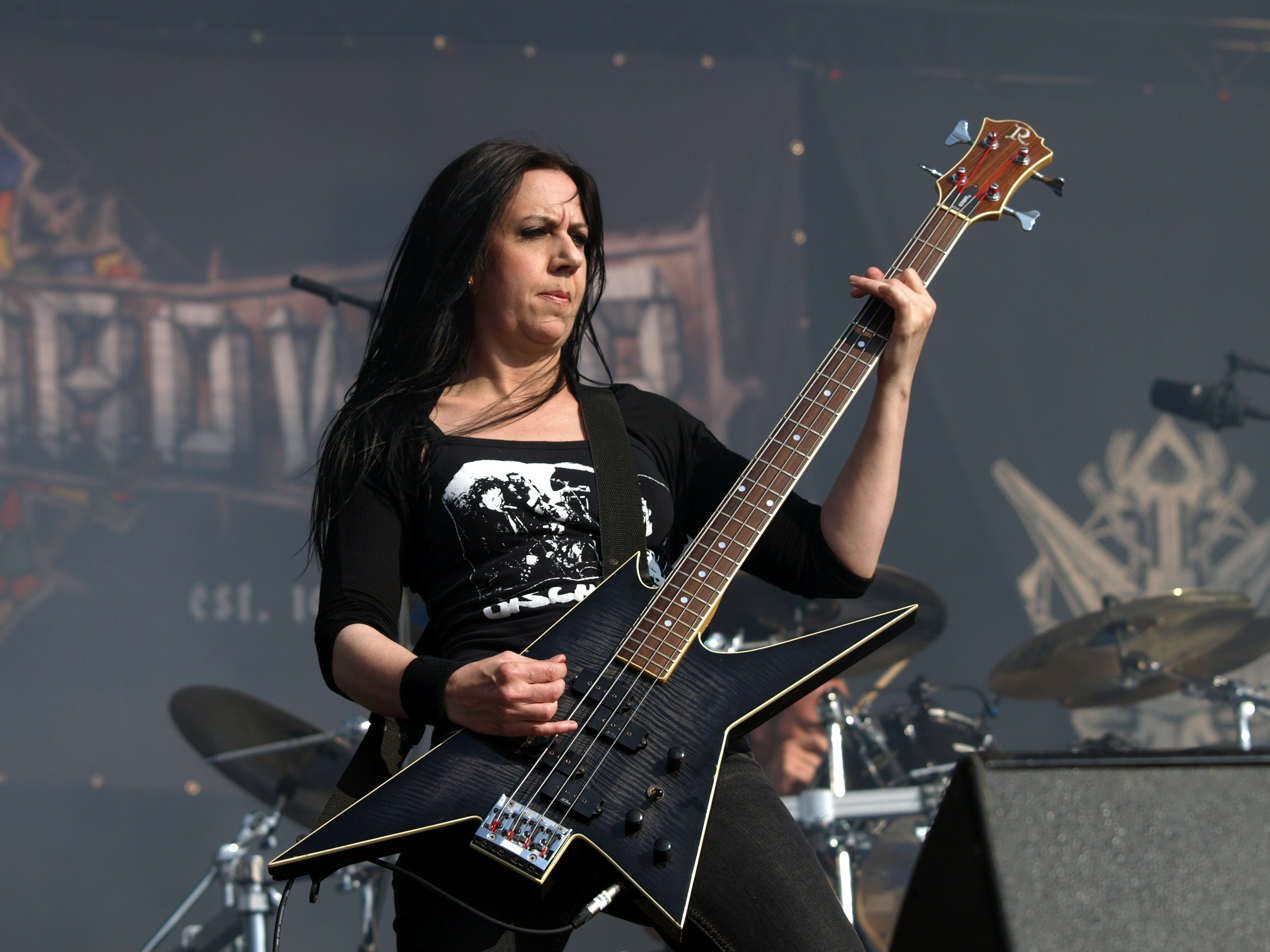
Jo Bench

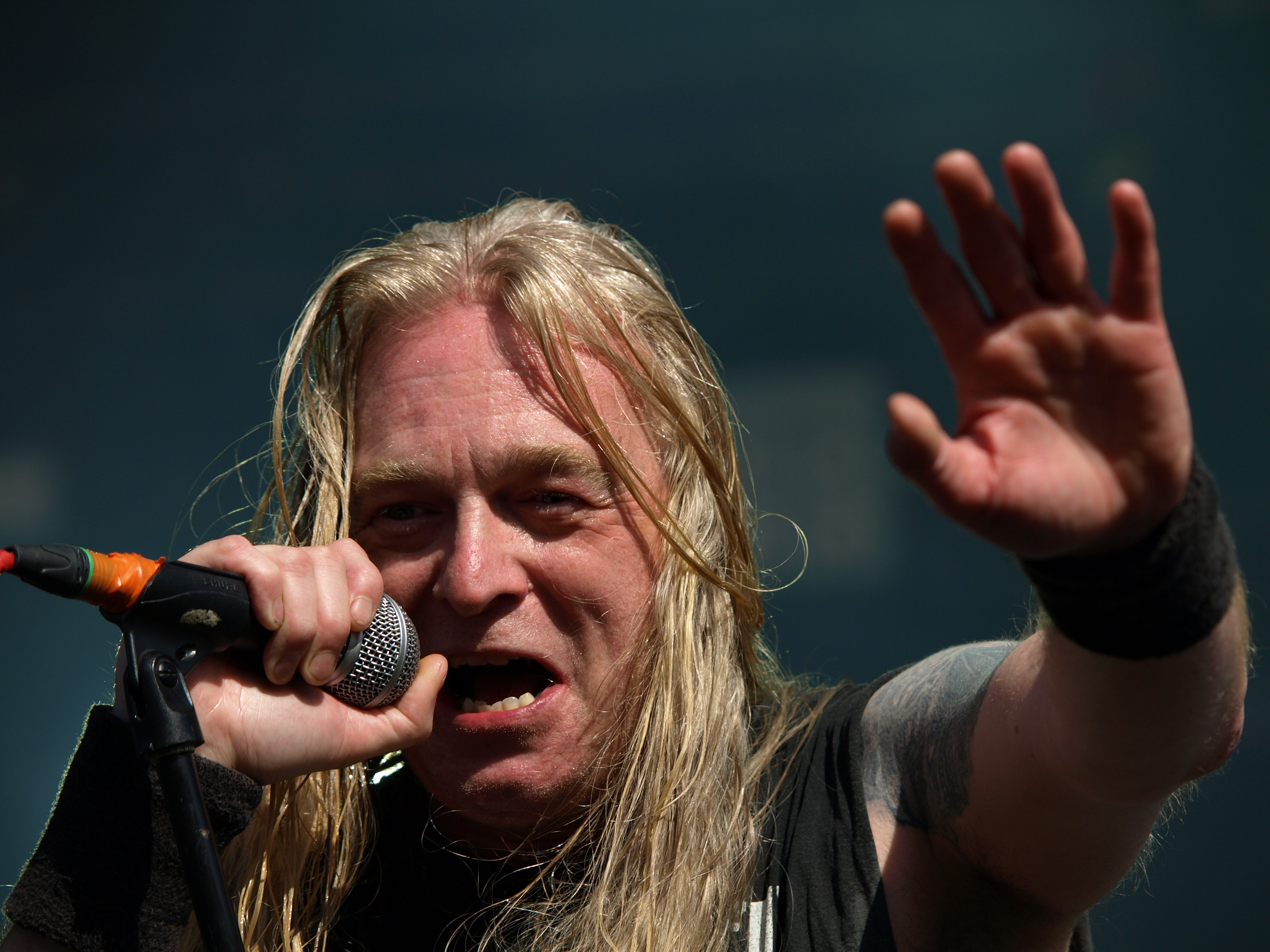
Karl Willetts

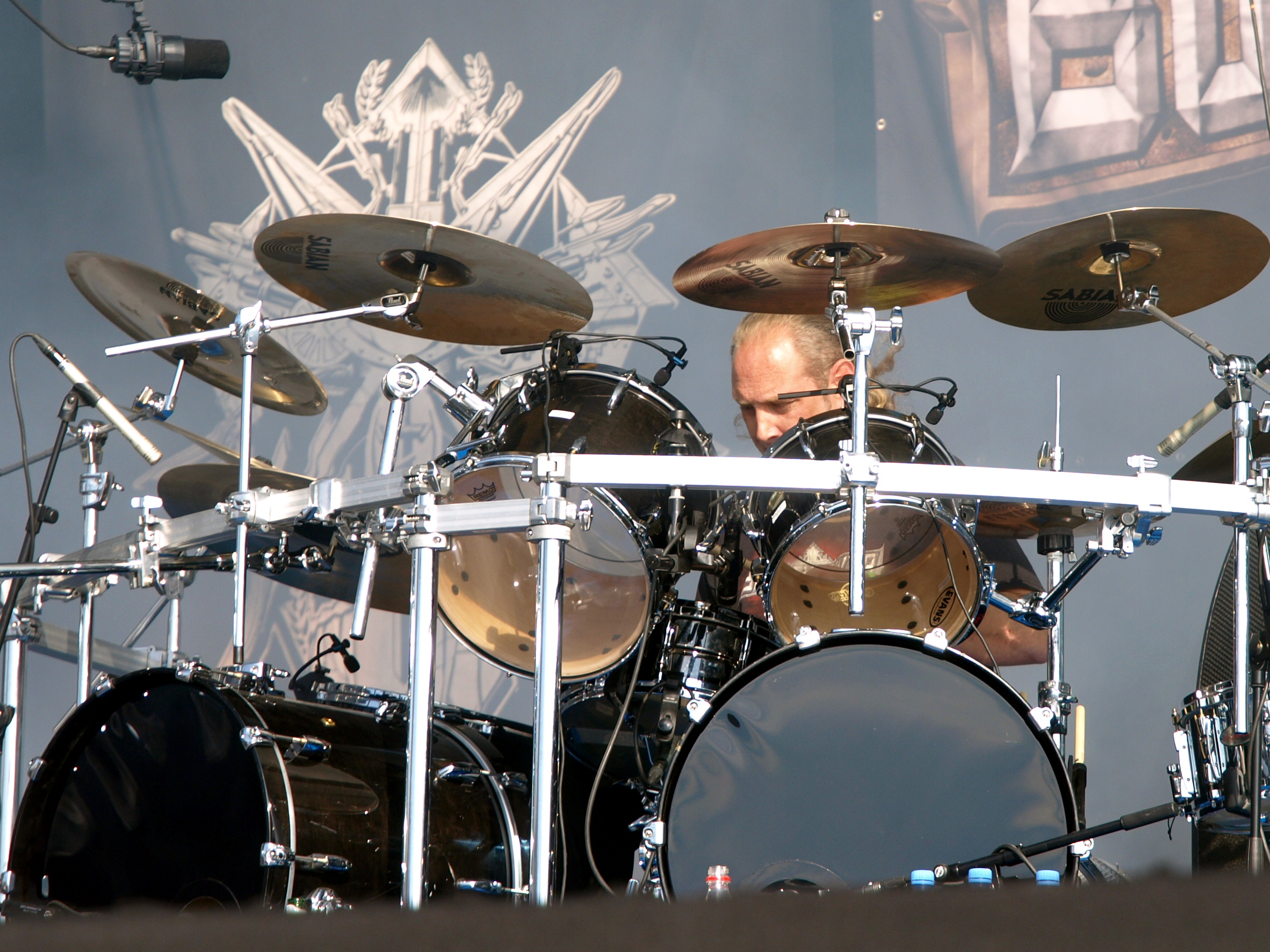
Martin Kearns

=== Final line-up ===
- Barry "Baz" Thomson – guitar (1986–2016)
- Gavin Ward – guitar (1987–2016), bass (1986–1987)
- Jo Bench – bass (1987–2016)
- Karl Willetts – vocals (1987–1994, 1997–1998, 2004–2016)
- Martin Kearns – drums (1994–1997, 1999–2015; his death)

=== Former members ===
- Andrew Whale – drums (1986–1994)
- Alan West – vocals (1986–1987)
- Alex Tweedy – bass (1987)
- Martin van Drunen – vocals (1994–1997)
- Alex Thomas – drums (1997–1999)
- Dave Ingram – vocals (1998–2004)

== Discography ==
=== Studio albums ===
- In Battle There Is No Law! (1988)
- Realm of Chaos: Slaves to Darkness (1989)
- War Master (1991)
- The IVth Crusade (1992)
- ...For Victory (1994)
- Mercenary (1998)
- Honour – Valour – Pride (2001)
- Those Once Loyal (2005)

=== Extended plays ===
- The Peel Session (1988)
- Cenotaph (1991)
- Spearhead (1992)

=== Live albums ===
- War (2010)

=== Compilation albums ===
- The Peel Sessions 1988–90 (1991)
- Who Dares Wins (1998)
- The Best of Bolt Thrower (2016)

=== Demos ===
- In Battle There Is No Law (self-released cassette, 1987)
- Concession of Pain (self-released cassette, 1987)
- Forgotten Existence (self-released cassette, 1988)
- Prophets of Hell (self-released cassette, 1988)

=== Video clips ===
- Cenotaph (1991)
- The IVth Crusade (1992)
- ...For Victory (1998)
- Inside the Wire (2000)

== Tours ==
Year	Region	Name	Supported/supporting bands
2015	Canada	Overtures of War Tour	Razor
2014	Europe	Overtures of War Tour	Morgoth, Soulburn, Incantation, Vallenfyre
2013	United States	Return to Chaos Tour	Benediction, Autopsy
2010	Europe	The Next Offensive Tour	Rotting Christ, Benediction
2006	Europe	Those Still Loyal Tour (2nd leg)	God Dethroned, Kataklysm
2006	Europe	Those Still Loyal Tour (1st leg)	Malevolent Creation, Nightrage, Necrophagist
2002	Europe	Ground Assault Tour	Benediction, Fleshcrawl, Disbelief
2001	Europe	Mini-tour	Fleshcrawl
1999	Europe	Into the Killing Zone Tour	Crowbar, Totenmond
1996	Europe	Fuck Price Politics Tour	Sentenced, Power of Expression, The Varukers
1995	Europe	No Guts, No Glory Tour	Cemetary, Brutality
1994	United States	World Crusade Tour	Benediction
1993	Australia	Australian Spearhead Assault Tour	Armoured Angel
1993	Europe	World Crusade Tour	Vader, Grave
1992	Europe	This Time It's War Tour	Benediction, Asphyx
1991	United States	War Mass Tour	Believer, Sacrifice
1991	Europe	War Mass Tour	Nocturnus, Unleashed
1990	Europe	Bloodbrothers Tour	Autopsy, Pestilence
1989	United Kingdom	GrindCrusher Tour	Morbid Angel, Napalm Death, Carcass
1988	United Kingdom	In Battle... Tour	Cerebral Fix
