= Dave Ingram =

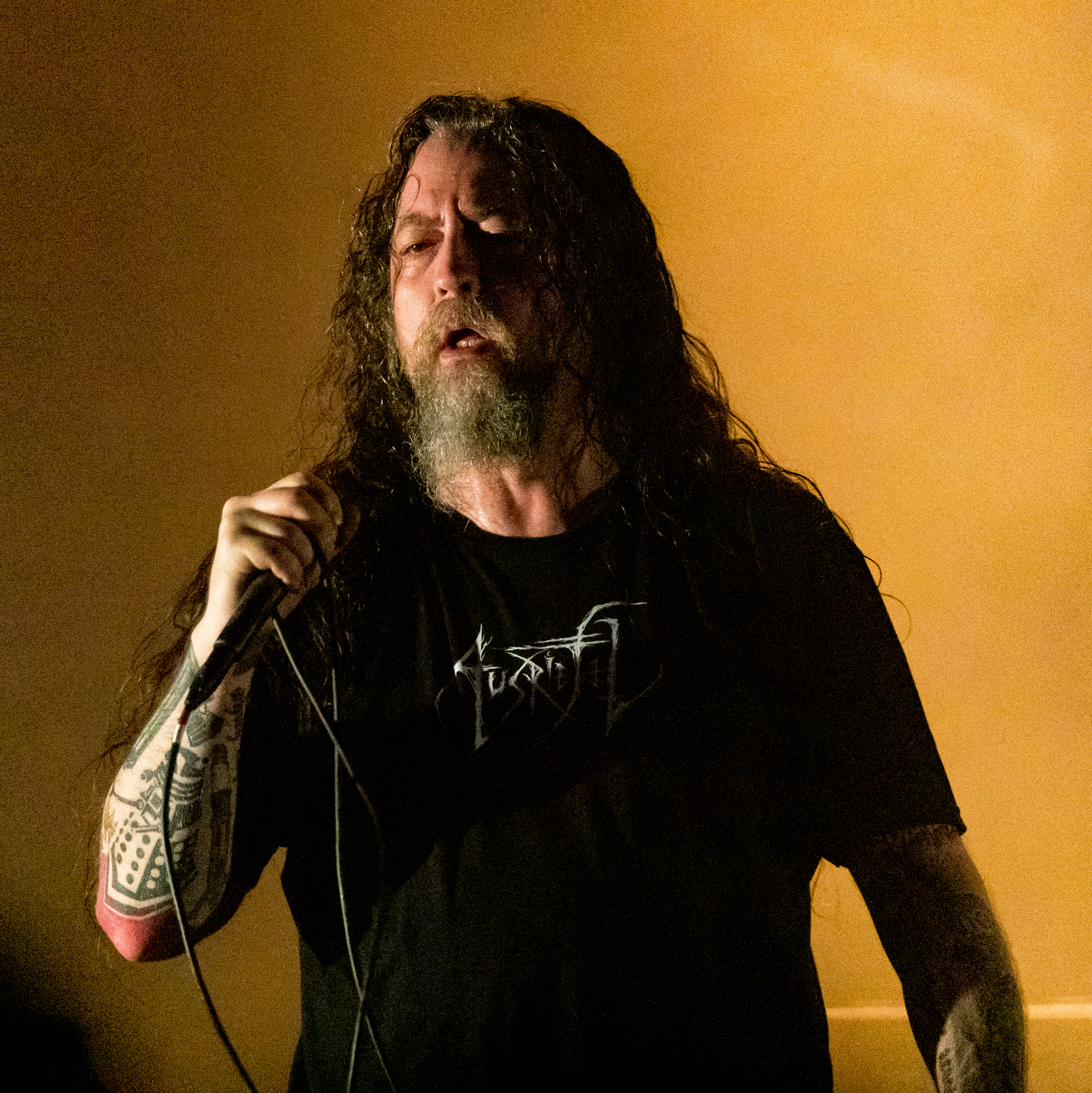
- Ingram with Benediction in 2023

Background information
- Born: David Richard Ingram; 25 January 1969 (age 57); Birmingham, England
- Genre: Death metal
- Occupation: Musician
- Instrument: Vocals
- Years active: 1990–present
- Member of: Benediction; Down Among The Dead Men; Echelon
- Formerly of: Bolt Thrower; Downlord; Hail of Bullets

David Richard Ingram (born 25 January 1969) is a death metal vocalist from Birmingham, England. He began his career replacing Mark "Barney" Greenway in death metal band Benediction when Greenway decided to focus solely on Napalm Death. Ingram stayed with Benediction until March 1998, when he joined Bolt Thrower, officially replacing Martin van Drunen after having handled vocals temporarily for the band during a show on 4 July 1997 in Zwickau Germany.

In 2004, Ingram left Bolt Thrower due to health problems, just prior to the recording of Those Once Loyal. He later performed vocals on an album by Warlord UK and sang in his own band Downlord until the band disbanded in 2008. Later that same year, he began Metal Breakfast Radio, an online metal show that reviews new music from underground bands in a unique and somewhat humorous manner. Ingram's own website can be found at www.darksentinel.dk (not active as of 21/April/2025)

In a departure from his metal roots, Ingram launched a big band jazz and swing themed online streaming radio program called Lambert's Basement. The title of the show is a tribute to his father Lawrence Albert Lambert Ingram.

The post-Downlord period saw Ingram involved in a number of other bands and projects. His collaboration with Rogga Johansson lead to the bands Down Among The Dead Men and Echelon.

In late 2015, Ingram was announced as the new vocalist for Dutch death metal band Hail of Bullets in anticipation of their appearance at Maryland Deathfest in May 2016. At the conclusion of the band's set, Hail of Bullets guitarist Stephan Gebédi announced Ingram had joined the band on a permanent basis. (In an odd coincidence, Ingram was again replacing van Drunen). The band announced their disbandment in March 2017.

In July 2019, Benediction announced Ingram had rejoined the band, following Dave Hunt's departure. The first album with Ingram, Scriptures, was released 16 October 2020.

== Discography ==
=== With Benediction ===
- The Grand Leveller (1991)
- Transcend the Rubicon (1993)
- The Dreams You Dread (1995)
- Grind Bastard (1998)
- Scriptures (2020)
- Ravage Of Empires (2025)

=== With Bolt Thrower ===
- Honour – Valour – Pride (2001)

=== With Downlord ===
- Grind Trials EP (2006)
- Random Dictionary of the Damned (2007)

=== With Down Among the Dead Men ===
- Down Among the Dead Men (2013)

=== With Echelon ===
- Indulgence Over Abstinence Behind the Obsidian Veil (2015)

=== With Warlord UK ===
- Maximum Carnage (1996)
