= Ceredwen =

Welsh musical duo

- Origin: South Wales
- Genres: Celtic folk; new age; ambient
- Years active: 1997–present
- Label: Real Music
- Members: Andrew Fryer; Renée Gray

Ceredwen (pronounced ker-ED-wen) is or was a Welsh musical duo comprising Andrew Fryer and Renée Gray who performed Celtic / new age music. The name comes from the Celtic goddess of inspiration and legendary mother of Taliesin, King Arthur's bard and "Keeper of the Cauldron".

Their debut album, Ô'r Mabinogi - Legends of the Celts (1997), featured in the Billboard charts for 3 months and won three NAV awards. Their second album, The Golden Land (1999), was also successful.

== History ==
Gray hails from South Wales and also plays in the Lucys, a Celtic folk-rock band; Fryer is an Englishman who formed his first band when he was 13 and works as a songwriter and independent record producer. Ceredwen's 1997 debut album Ô'r Mabinogi - Legends of the Celts was inspired by the tales ancient Celtic storytellers told of their ruler's heroic deeds, and featured real and sampled Celtic instruments like the bodhran, pennywhistle, flute and uilleann pipes along with contemporary rhythms and Gray's vocals. Their 1999 second album The Golden Land, followed a similar musical path and used the Druids' fight against the invading Roman army as source material.

Ceredwen signed with the U.S. record label Real Music. Their music has been compared to that of Enya due to its use of traditional instruments and ambient approach, but differs in its use of language. Enya sings in Irish whereas Ceredwen sing entirely in Welsh.

== Discography ==
- Ô'r Mabinogi - Legends of the Celts (1997)
- The Golden Land (1999)
