= Martin Kearns =

English death metal drummer (1977–2015)

- Kearns in 2009

Background information
- Also known as: Kiddie
- Born: 7 March 1977
- Died: 14 September 2015 (aged 38)
- Genre: Death metal
- Instrument: Drums
- Years active: 1994–2015
- Label: Metal Blade
- Website: http://www.boltthrower.com

Kearns performing in 2010

Martin Kearns (7 March 1977 – 14 September 2015) was an English drummer, specializing in death metal, known for his association with Bolt Thrower since 1994. He joined the band at age 17 after playing in several local bands in Coventry, playing anything from metal to reggae, having been playing pub gigs since the age of 14.

== Bolt Thrower ==
Kearns subsequently left for personal reasons in 1998, he returned to Bolt Thrower in 2000. Martin was the longest standing drummer for Bolt Thrower. He recorded drums on both the Honour-Valour-Pride album, and on Those Once Loyal, the latter of which has been met with widespread critical acclaim from magazines such as Rock Sound, Rock Hard and Metal Hammer.

== Death ==
Kearns died unexpectedly at the age of 38, on 14 September 2015. The band posted on Sputnikmusic that Kearns reported breathing troubles and lightheadedness during a practice session, and, after trying to relax with a shower and nap, was found to have died peacefully in his sleep. The following year, the remaining members of Bolt Thrower eventually decided to dissolve the band rather than replace Kearns, with frontman Karl Willetts stating, "I can confirm that Bolt Thrower are definitely over for good. There will be no reunion tours etc... no compromise."

== Discography ==
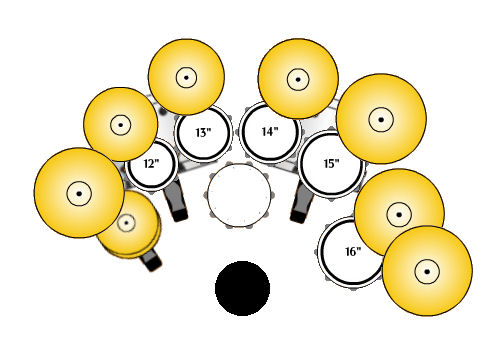
Drum kit use for the recording of Those Once Loyal.

Studio albums:

- Honour – Valour – Pride (Metal Blade Records, 2001)
- Those Once Loyal (Metal Blade Records, 2005)
