= Benediction (band) =

British death metal band

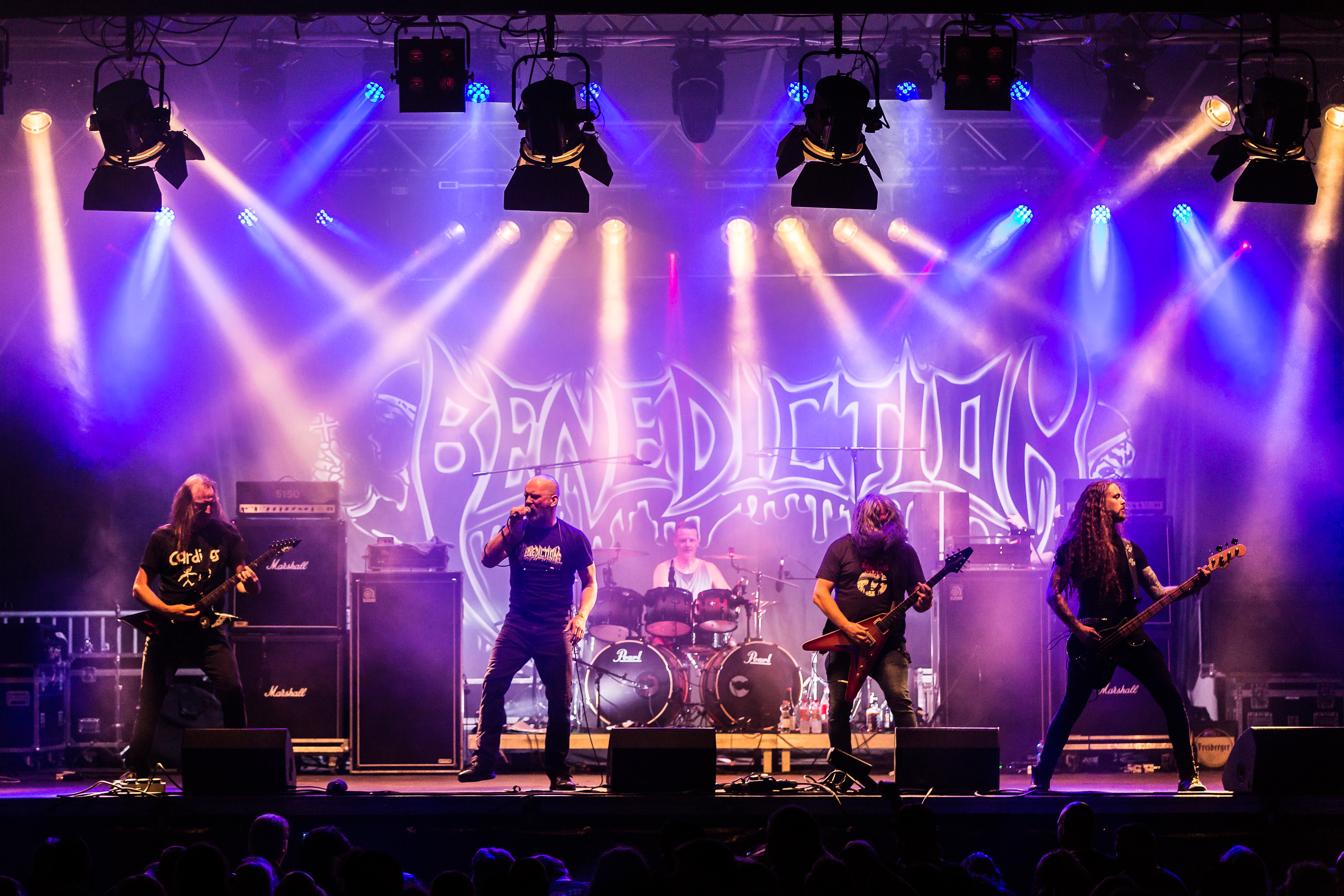
- Benediction performing in 2019

Background information
- Origin: Birmingham, England
- Genre: Death metal
- Years active: 1989–present
- Label: Nuclear Blast
- Members: Darren Brookes; Peter Rewinsky; Dave Ingram; Gio Durst; Nik Sampson
- Past members: Frank Healy; Ian Treacy; Paul Adams; Mark "Barney" Greenway; Dave Hunt; Neil Hutton; Ashley Guest; Nick Barker; Dan Bate

Benediction are a British death metal band, formed in Birmingham in 1989.

Benediction released its first album, Subconscious Terror, in 1990. The band's latest album, Ravage of Empires, was released in April 2025. The band played Maryland Deathfest that same year.

== Style ==
Benediction's music has been described as "intense" and categorised as death metal.

== Members ==
Current

- Peter Rewinsky – lead guitar (1989–present)
- Darren Brookes – rhythm guitar (1989–present)
- Giovanni Durst – drums (2019–present)
- Kam Lee – vocals (2026–present)
- George Chick – bass (2026–present; live 2026)

Former

- Ian Treacy – drums (1989–1993)
- Paul Adams – bass (1989–1991)
- Mark "Barney" Greenway – vocals (1989–1990)
- Dave Ingram – vocals (1991–1998, 2019–2026)
- Frank Healy – bass (1992–2017)
- Neil Hutton – drums (1994–2005, died in 2026)
- Dave Hunt – vocals (1998–2019)
- Nick Barker – drums (2005–2011)
- Perra Karlsson – drums (2011–2013)
- Ashley Guest – drums (2013–2019)
- Dan Bate – bass (2018–2023)
- Nik Sampson – bass (2023–2026)

Live

- Oscar Rilo – vocals (2026)

Timeline

== Discography ==
Studio albums

- Subconscious Terror (1990)
- The Grand Leveller (1991)
- Dark Is the Season (1992)
- Transcend the Rubicon (1993)
- The Grotesque-Ashen Epitath (1994)
- The Dreams You Dread (1995)
- Grind Bastard (1998)
- Organised Chaos (2001)
- Killing Music (2008)
- Scriptures (2020)
- Ravage of Empires (2025)
