= Barry Thomson =

- Barry Thomson in 2013

Background information
- Genre: Death metal
- Years active: 1986–present
- Label: Metal Blade
- Formerly of: Bolt Thrower
- Website: http://www.boltthrower.com

Barry "Baz" Thomson is an English musician, best known for being the lead and rhythm guitarist for death metal band Bolt Thrower until their disbandment in 2016. He co-founded the band in 1986, and was also the main songwriter of the band. He remained in Bolt Thrower until they broke up in 2016, following the death of drummer Martin Kearns the year before. Thomson also did some backing vocals on the Benediction album, Grind Bastard.

== Equipment ==
- BC Rich Warlock,
- Jackson Kelly,
- Boss GX700,
- Marshall 9040 200w power amp,
- 4 x Marshall 4x12
