= Jo Bench =

- Bench in 2013

Background information
- Born: Jo-Anne Bench; 1969 (age 56–57); Leamington Spa, England
- Genre: Death metal
- Instrument: Bass guitar
- Years active: 1986–present
- Label: Metal Blade
- Website: http://www.boltthrower.com

Jo-Anne Bench is a British musician from Leamington Spa, who is best known as the bassist for Bolt Thrower. She has performed on all of the band's albums. Noted for being one of the first women in the extreme metal genre, Bench has been influential to a number of other female musicians in the genre.

Bench joined the band in 1987, shortly after Gavin Ward switched from bass guitar to guitar. At the time, she was Ward's long-time girlfriend and notable as one of a few female members in a commercially successful metal band. Bolt Thrower were active until 2016, when they decided to disband following the death of drummer Martin Kearns the previous year.

She contributed guest vocals (spoken word) on the track "Resurrected For Massive Torture" by The Project Hate MCMXCIX on the 2005 album Armageddon March Eternal – Symphonies of Slit Wrists.

== Equipment ==
- BC Rich Ironbird
- Peavey T-Max
- Ibanez Tube Screamer
- 2 x Laney 2x15
