= Ernest Tubb discography =

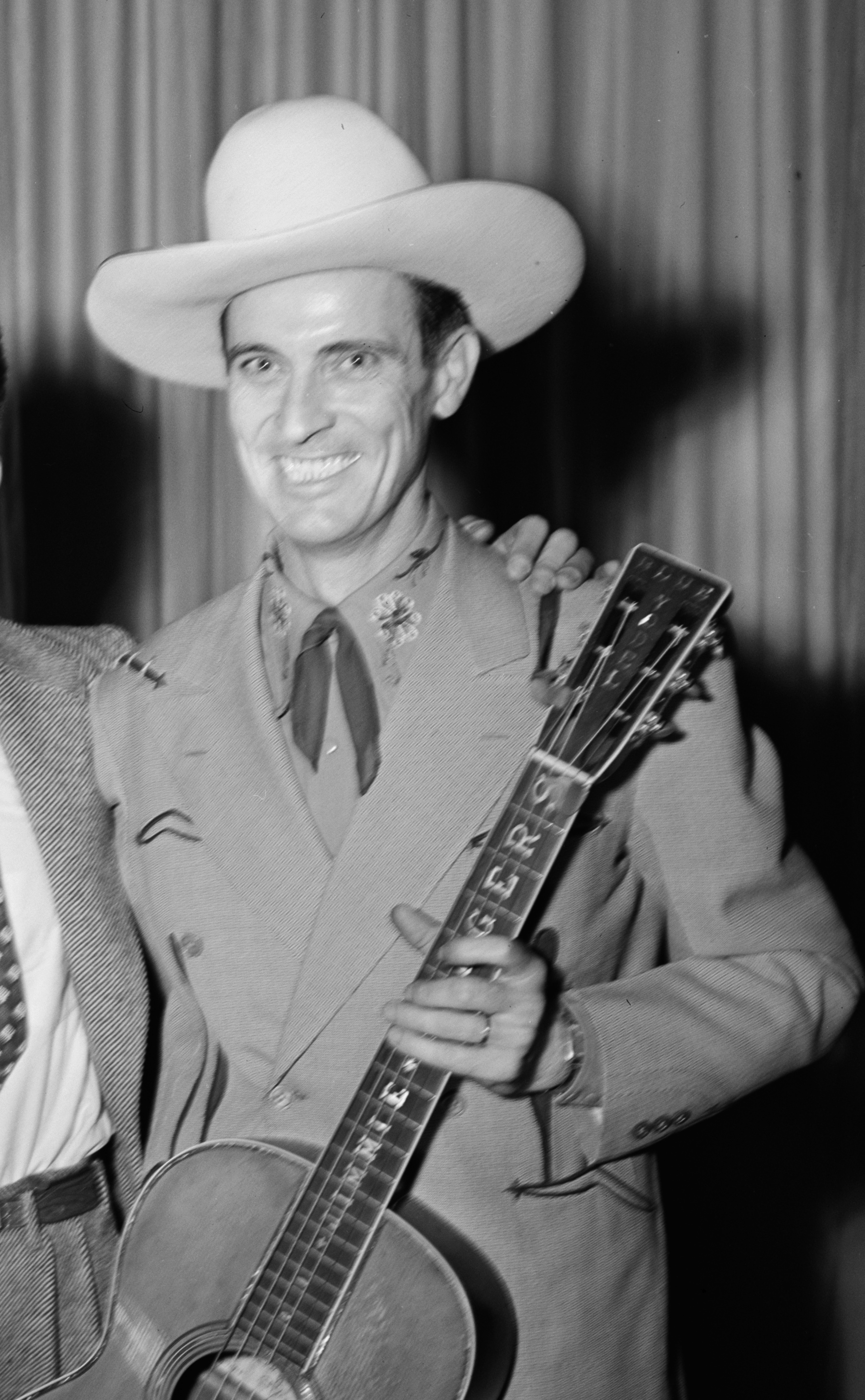
- Studio albums: 37
- Compilation albums: 26
- Singles: 92
- No. 1 singles: 6

Ernest Tubb was an American singer and songwriter and one of the pioneers of country music.

== Studio albums ==
=== 1940s and 1950s ===
| Title | Details |
|---|---|
| Ernest Tubb Souvenir Album | Release date: 1947; Label: Decca Records |
| Favorites | Release date: 1952; Label: Decca Records |
| Old Rugged Cross | Release date: 1952; Label: Decca Records |
| Songs of Jimmie Rodgers | Release date: 1953; Label: Decca Records |
| Favorites | Release date: 1956; Label: Decca Records |
| Daddy of 'Em All | Release date: July 1957; Label: Decca Records |
| The Importance of Being Ernest | Release date: January 1959; Label: Decca Records |

=== 1960s ===
| Title | Details | Peak positions |
| Title | Details | US Country |
|---|---|---|
| Ernest Tubb Record Shop | Release date: 1960; Label: Decca Records | — |
| Ernest Tubb and His Texas Troubadours | Release date: June 1960; Label: Vocalion Records | — |
| Midnight Jamboree | Release date: 1960; Label: Decca Records | — |
| All Time Hits | Release date: December 1960; Label: Decca Records | — |
| Golden Favorites | Release date: 1961; Label: Decca Records | — |
| On Tour | Release date: October 1962; Label: Decca Records | — |
| Ernest Tubb's Fabulous Texas Troubadours | Release date: 1963; Label: Decca Records | — |
| Just Call Me Lonesome | Release date: June 1963; Label: Decca Records | — |
| The Family Bible | Release date: June 1963; Label: Decca Records | — |
| Thanks a Lot | Release date: June 1964; Label: Decca Records | 7 |
| Blue Christmas | Release date: 1964; Label: Decca Records | — |
| My Pick of the Hits | Release date: June 1965; Label: Decca Records | 15 |
| Hittin' the Road | Release date: November 1965; Label: Decca Records | — |
| Stand by Me | Release date: November 1965; Label: Vocalion Records | — |
| By Request | Release date: April 1966; Label: Decca Records | 28 |
| Country Hits Old and New | Release date: October 1966; Label: Decca Records | 35 |
| Another Story | Release date: April 1967; Label: Decca Records | 6 |
| Ernest Tubb Sings Hank Williams | Release date: March 1968; Label: Decca Records | 34 |
| Country Hit Time | Release date: September 1968; Label: Decca Records | — |
| Saturday Satan Sunday Saint | Release date: June 1969; Label: Decca Records | 34 |
| Let's Turn Back the Years | Release date: November 1969; Label: Decca Records | — |
"—" denotes releases that did not chart

=== 1970s ===
| Title | Details | Peak positions |
| Title | Details | US Country |
|---|---|---|
| Good Year for the Wine | Release date: July 1970; Label: Decca Records | — |
| One Sweet Hello | Release date: September 1971; Label: Decca Records | — |
| Say Something Nice to Sarah | Release date: 1972; Label: Decca Records | 33 |
| Baby It's So Hard to Be Good | Release date: 1972; Label: Decca Records | — |
| I've Got All the Heartaches I Can Handle | Release date: 1973; Label: MCA Records | — |
| Ernest Tubb | Release date: August 1975; Label: MCA Records | 45 |
"—" denotes releases that did not chart

== Collaborations ==
| Title | Details | Peak positions |
| Title | Details | US Country |
|---|---|---|
| Red and Ernie (with Red Foley) | Release date: 1956; Label: Decca Records | — |
| Mr. & Mrs. Used to Be (with Loretta Lynn) | Release date: 1965; Label: Decca Records | 13 |
| Singin' Again (with Loretta Lynn) | Release date: 1967; Label: Decca Records | 2 |
| If We Put Our Heads Together (with Loretta Lynn) | Release date: June 2, 1969; Label: Decca Records | 19 |
| Story (with Loretta Lynn) | Release date: 1973; Label: MCA Records | 43 |
| Just You and Me, Daddy (with Justin Tubb) | Release date: 1999; Label: First Generation | — |
"—" denotes releases that did not chart

== Selected compilations ==
| Title | Details | Peak positions |
| Title | Details | US Country |
|---|---|---|
| The Ernest Tubb Story | Release date: September 1959; Label: Decca Records | — |
| Ernest Tubb's Greatest Hits | Release date: 1968; Label: Decca Records | 44 |
| Ernest Tubb's Greatest Hits, Vol. 2 | Release date: 1970; Label: Decca Records | — |
| Greatest Hits, Vol. 2 | Release date: 1974; Label: MCA Records | — |
| The Legend and the Legacy^{[A]} | Release date: 1979; Label: Cachet Records | 10 |
| Honkey Tonk Classics | Release date: 1983; Label: Rounder Records | — |
| Country Music Hall of Fame | Release date: 1987; Label: MCA Records | — |
| Retrospective, Vol. 1 | Release date: 1987; Label: Universal Special Products | — |
| Retrospective, Vol. 2 | Release date: 1987; Label: Universal Special Products | — |
| Let's Say Goodbye Like We Said Hello (box set) | Release date: 1991; Label: Bear Family Records | — |
| Yellow Rose of Texas (box set) | Release date: 1993; Label: Bear Family Records | — |
| Walking the Floor Over You (box set) | Release date: 1996; Label: Bear Family Records | — |
| Another Story | Release date: 1999; Label: Bear Family Records | — |
| 20th Century Masters – The Millennium Collection: The Best of Ernest Tubb | Release date: 2000; Label: MCA Records | — |
| Country Hoedown | Release date: 2000; Label: Jasmine Records | — |
| There's a Little Bit of Everything in Texas | Release date: 2000; Label: Jasmine Records | — |
| Early Hits of The Texas Troubadour | Release date: 2000; Label: ASV/Living Era Records | — |
| The Definitive Ernest Tubb Hits Collection | Release date: 2001; Label: Collectors' Choice Music | — |
| Texas Troubadour (box set) | Release date: 2003; Label: Proper Records | — |
| Blue Eyed Elaine (Tubb the Songwriter) | Release date: 2003; Label: Proper Records | — |
| Walking the Floor Over You (The Hits, Vol. 1) | Release date: 2003; Label: Proper Records | — |
| Slippin' Around (The Hits, Vol. 2) | Release date: 2003; Label: Proper Records | — |
| Time After Time (Writers Galore) | Release date: 2003; Label: Proper Records | — |
| The Definitive Collection | Release date: June 6, 2006; Label: MCA Nashville | — |
"—" denotes releases that did not chart

== Singles ==
=== 1930s and 1940s ===
| Year | Single | Peak chart positions | |
| Year | Single | US Country | US |
|---|---|---|---|
| 1936 | "The Passing of Jimmie Rodgers" | — | — |
| 1936 | "This TB Is Whipping Me" | — | — |
| 1940 | "Blue Eyed Elaine" | — | — |
| 1940 | "I'll Get Along Somehow" | — | — |
| 1940 | "I'll Never Cry Over You" | — | — |
| 1941 | "I Cared For You More Than You Know" | — | — |
| 1941 | "Walking the Floor Over You" | — | 23 |
| 1941 | "Mean Mama Blues" | — | — |
| 1943 | "You Nearly Lose Your Mind" | — | — |
| 1944 | "Try Me One More Time" | 2 | 18 |
| 1944 | "Soldier's Last Letter" | 1 | 16 |
| 1944 | "Yesterday's Tears" | 4 | 29 |
| 1945 | "Keep My Mem'ry in Your Heart" | 6 | — |
| 1945 | "Tomorrow Never Comes" | 3 | — |
| 1945 | "Careless Darlin'" | 3 | — |
| 1945 | "It's Been So Long Darling" | 1 | — |
| 1946 | "Rainbow at Midnight" | 1 | — |
| 1946 | "Filipino Baby" | 2 | — |
| 1946 | "Drivin' Nails in My Coffin" | 5 | — |
| 1947 | "Don't Look Now (But Your Broken Heart Is Showing)" | 4 | — |
| 1947 | "So Round, So Firm, So Fully Packed" | 5 | — |
| 1947 | "I'll Step Aside" | 4 | — |
| 1948 | "Seaman's Blues" | 5 | — |
| 1948 | "You Nearly Lose Your Mind" | 15 | — |
| 1948 | "Forever Is Ending Today" | 5 | 30 |
| 1948 | "That Wild and Wicked Look in Your Eye" | 9 | — |
| 1948 | "Have You Ever Been Lonely?" | 2 | — |
| 1948 | "Let's Say Goodbye Like We Said Hello" | 5 | — |
| 1949 | "Till the End of the World" | 4 | — |
| 1949 | "Daddy, When Is Mommy Coming Home" | 15 | — |
| 1949 | "Mean Mama Blues" | 6 | — |
| 1949 | "Slippin' Around" | 1 | 17 |
| 1949 | "My Filipino Rose" | 6 | — |
| 1949 | "Warm Red Wine" | 8 | — |
| 1949 | "My Tennessee Baby" | 10 | — |
"—" denotes releases that did not chart

=== 1950s ===
| Year | Single | Peak chart positions | |
| Year | Single | US Country | US |
|---|---|---|---|
| 1950 | "Letters Have No Arms" | 2 | — |
| 1950 | "I'll Take a Back Seat for You" | 8 | — |
| 1950 | "I Love You Because" | 2 | — |
| 1950 | "Unfaithful One" | 8 | — |
| 1950 | "Throw Your Love My Way" | 3 | — |
| 1950 | "Give Me a Little Old Fashioned Love" | 9 | — |
| 1950 | "You Don't Have to Be a Baby to Cry" | 10 | — |
| 1950 | "(Remember Me) I'm the One Who Loves You" | 5 | — |
| 1951 | "Don't Stay Too Long" | 9 | — |
| 1951 | "Hey La La" | 6 | — |
| 1951 | "Driftwood on the River" | 7 | — |
| 1952 | "Missing in Action" | 3 | — |
| 1952 | "Somebody's Stolen My Honey" | 9 | — |
| 1952 | "Fortunes in Memories" | 5 | — |
| 1953 | "Divorce Granted" | 9 | — |
| 1953 | "I'll Miss You When You Go" | — | 22 |
| 1953 | "Counterfeit Kisses" | — | 25 |
| 1954 | "Two Glasses, Joe" | 11 | — |
| 1955 | "The Yellow Rose of Texas" | 7 | — |
| 1955 | "Thirty Days (To Come Back Home)" | 7 | — |
| 1957 | "Don't Forbid Me/God's Eyes" | – | — |
| 1958 | "House of Glass" | 13 | — |
| 1958 | "Half a Mind" | 8 | — |
| 1958 | "The Blues" | 21 | — |
| 1959 | "What Am I Living For" | 19 | — |
| 1959 | "I Cried a Tear" | 12 | — |
| 1959 | "Next Time" | 14 | — |
"—" denotes releases that did not chart

=== 1960s ===
| Year | Single | Peak positions |
| Year | Single | US Country |
|---|---|---|
| 1960 | "Ev'rybody's Somebody's Fool" | 16 |
| 1961 | "Thoughts of a Fool" | 16 |
| 1961 | "Through That Door" | 14 |
| 1962 | "I'm Looking High and Low for My Baby" | 16 |
| 1962 | "Show Her Lots of Gold" | 30 |
| 1963 | "Mr. Juke Box" | 28 |
| 1963 | "Thanks a Lot" | 3 |
| 1964 | "Be Better to Your Baby" | 26 |
| 1964 | "Pass the Booze" | 15 |
| 1965 | "Do What You Do Do Well" | 29 |
| 1966 | "Another Story" | 16 |
| 1968 | "Too Much of Not Enough" | 55 |
| 1968 | "I'm Gonna Make Like a Snake" | 69 |
| 1969 | "Saturday Satan Sunday Saint" | 43 |

=== 1970s ===
| Year | Single | Peak chart positions | |
| Year | Single | US Country | CAN Country |
|---|---|---|---|
| 1973 | "I've Got All the Heartaches I Can Handle" | 93 | — |
| 1977 | "Sometimes I Do" | 79 | — |
| 1977 | "Half My Heart's in Texas" | flip | — |
| 1979 | "Waltz Across Texas" (re-release) | 56 | 31 |
| 1979 | "Walking the Floor Over You" (w/ Merle Haggard) | 31 | 18 |
"—" denotes releases that did not chart

== Other singles ==
=== Collaborations ===
| Year | Single | Artist | Peak chart positions | |
| Year | Single | Artist | US Country | US |
|---|---|---|---|---|
| 1949 | "I'm Bitin' My Fingernails and Thinking of You" | The Andrews Sisters | 2 | 30 |
| 1949 | "Don't Rob Another Man's Castle" | The Andrews Sisters | 6 | — |
| 1949 | "Tennessee Border No. 2" | Red Foley | 2 | — |
| 1950 | "Don't Be Ashamed of Your Age" | Red Foley | 7 | — |
| 1950 | "Goodnight Irene" | Red Foley & The Sunshine Trio | 1 | 10 |
| 1950 | "Hillbilly Fever No. 2" | Red Foley | 9 | — |
| 1951 | "The Strange Little Girl" | Red Foley & Anita Kerr | 9 | — |
| 1952 | "Too Old to Cut the Mustard" | Red Foley | 5 | — |
| 1953 | "No Help Wanted #2" | Red Foley | 7 | — |
| 1957 | "Mister Love" | The Wilburn Brothers | 8 | — |
| 1958 | "Hey, Mr. Bluebird" | The Wilburn Brothers | 9 | — |
| 1964 | "Mr. and Mrs. Used to Be"^{[B]} | Loretta Lynn | 11 | — |
| 1965 | "Our Hearts Are Holding Hands" | Loretta Lynn | 24 | — |
| 1965 | "Waltz Across Texas" | His Texas Troubadours | 34 | — |
| 1966 | "It's for God, and Country, and You Mom (That's Why I'm Fighting in Viet Nam)" | His Texas Troubadours | 48 | — |
| 1966 | "Till My Getup Has Gotup and Gone" | His Texas Troubadours | 32 | — |
| 1967 | "Sweet Thang" | Loretta Lynn | 45 | — |
| 1969 | "Who's Gonna Take the Garbage Out" | Loretta Lynn | 18 | — |
"—" denotes releases that did not chart

=== Guest singles ===
| Year | Single | Artist | Peak chart positions | |
| Year | Single | Artist | US Country | CAN Country |
|---|---|---|---|---|
| 1983 | "Leave Them Boys Alone" | Hank Williams, Jr. & Waylon Jennings | 6 | 7 |

=== Christmas singles ===
| Year | Single | Peak chart positions | |
| Year | Single | US Country | US |
|---|---|---|---|
| 1949 | "Blue Christmas" | 1 | 21 |
| 1949 | "White Christmas" | 7 | — |
| 1950 | "Blue Christmas" (re-entry) | 9 | — |
| 1952 | "Blue Christmas" (re-entry) | 5 | — |
"—" denotes releases that did not chart

== Notes ==
- A The Legend and the Legacy also peaked at number 2 on the RPM Country Albums chart in Canada.
- B "Mr. and Mrs. Used to Be" reached number 4 on the RPM Country Tracks in Canada.
