= That's All She Wrote (disambiguation) =

"That's All She Wrote" is a 2010 song by rapper T.I.

That's All She Wrote may also refer to:

== Music ==
- Ernest Tubb recorded a song titled “That's All She Wrote” (sheet music published in 1942)
- "That's All She Wrote" (Jerry Fuller song), 1964; recorded by:
  - Ernest Tubb, on the album Thanks a Lot, 1964
  - Johnny Mathis, on the album Feelings, 1975
  - Ray Price, see Ray Price discography, 1976
- A song on the B-side of "Boogie Grass Band" by Conway Twitty, 1974
- A song on the B-side of "Tie Your Dream to Mine" by Marty Robbins, 1982
- A song by Reba McEntire from the album Rumor Has It, 1990
- A song by Ricky Nelson, 1963
- A song by German jazz saxophonist Ingrid Laubrock on the album Roulette of the Cradle

== Other uses ==
- "That's All She Wrote", a 2001 exhibition by Colette Justine

== See also ==
- All She Wrote (disambiguation)
