= Ernest Tubb Sings Hank Williams =

Studio album by Ernest Tubb
- Released: March 1968
- Recorded: November–December, 1967
- Studio: Bradley's Barn, Mount Juliet, Tennessee
- Genre: Country, Honky tonk
- Label: Decca DL-74957
- Producer: Owen Bradley

Ernest Tubb chronology
Singin' Again (1967)	Ernest Tubb Sings Hank Williams (1968)	Country Hit Time (1968)

Ernest Tubb Sings Hank Williams is an album by American country singer Ernest Tubb, released in 1968 (see 1968 in music). It is a tribute to the songs of country singer-songwriter Hank Williams.

Professional ratings
Review scores
Source	Rating
AllMusic	4.5/5 stars

== Track listing ==
All songs by Hank Williams unless otherwise noted.

1. "Hey, Good Lookin'"
2. "I'm So Lonesome I Could Cry"
3. "Take These Chains from My Heart" (Fred Rose, Hy Heath)
4. "I Can't Help It (If I'm Still in Love with You)"
5. "A Mansion on the Hill" (Hank Williams, Fred Rose)
6. "Mind Your Own Business"
7. "Your Cheatin' Heart"
8. "Cold, Cold Heart"
9. "Window Shopping" (Marcel Joseph)
10. "Someday You'll Call My Name" (Jean Branch, Eddie Hill)
11. "I Could Never Be Ashamed of You"

== Personnel ==
- Ernest Tubb – vocals, guitar
- Jerry Shook – guitar, bass
- Grady Martin – guitar
- Steve Chapman – guitar
- Buddy Charleton – pedal steel guitar
- Jack Drake – bass
- Billy Pfender – drums
- Hargus "Pig" Robbins – piano

== Chart positions ==
Chart (1968)	Position
Billboard Country Albums	34
