= Thanks a Lot =

Thanks a Lot may refer to:

- "Thanks a Lot" (Johnny Cash song), 1959
- "Thanks a Lot" (Ernest Tubb song), 1963
- Thanks a Lot (album), a 1964 Ernest Tubb album
- "Thanks a Lot", a song by Raffi, from the 1980 album Baby Beluga
- "Thanks a Lot", a song by Third Eye Blind, from the 1997 album Third Eye Blind
- "Thanks a Lot", a song by Band of Skulls, from the 2019 album Love Is All You Love
