= Ernest Tubb and His Texas Troubadours =

Studio album by Ernest Tubb
- Released: June 1960
- Recorded: 1954–1958
- Studio: Bradley Studios, Nashville, Tennessee
- Genre: Country, honky tonk
- Label: Vocalion
- Producer: Owen Bradley, Paul Cohen

Ernest Tubb chronology
Ernest Tubb Record Shop (1960)	Ernest Tubb and His Texas Troubadours (1960)	Midnight Jamboree (1960)

Ernest Tubb and His Texas Troubadours is an album by American country singer Ernest Tubb, released in 1960.

== Track listing ==
1. "Yellow Rose of Texas" (Don George)
2. "I'll Step Aside" (Johnny Bond)
3. "Drivin' Nails in My Coffin" (Gerald Irby)
4. "Till We Two Are One" (Tom Glazer, Billy Martin, Larry Martin)
5. "Jealous Loving Heart" (Ernest Tubb)
6. "Kansas City Blues" (Ernest Tubb)
7. "Don't Forbid Me" (Charles Singleton)
8. "Two Glasses Joe" (Cindy Walker)
9. "Journey's End" (E. Tubb, Henry Stewart)
10. "It's a Lonely World (E. Tubb, Redd Stewart)
11. "You Don't Have to Be a Baby to Cry (Merrill Shand)
12. "There's a Little Bit of Everything in Texas" (E. Tubb)

== Personnel ==
- Ernest Tubb – vocals, guitar
- Billy Byrd – guitar
- Leon Rhodes – lead guitar (1960–1967)
- Cal Smith – rhythm guitar (1961–1967)
- Steve Chapman – lead guitar (1967-)
- Grady Martin – guitar
- Buddy Emmons – pedal steel guitar, guitar (1960–1961)
- Buddy Charleton – pedal steel guitar (1962–1967)
- Dickie Harris – pedal steel guitar
- Jack Drake – bass
- Farris Coursey – drums
- Buddy Harman – drums
- Jack Greene – drums (1962–1965)
- Floyd Cramer – piano
- Owen Bradley – piano
- Dale Potter – fiddle
- Tommy Jackson – fiddle
- Pete Mitchell - Guitar
