= My Pick of the Hits =

Studio album by Ernest Tubb
- Released: June 1965
- Recorded: 1965 at Columbia Studio and RCA Studios, Nashville, TN
- Genre: Country, Honky tonk
- Label: Decca
- Producer: Owen Bradley

Ernest Tubb chronology
Mr. and Mrs. Used to Be (1965)	My Pick of the Hits (1965)	Hittin' the Road (1965)

Professional ratings
Review scores
Source	Rating
AllMusic	3/5 stars
Record Mirror	3/5 stars

My Pick of the Hits is an album by American country singer Ernest Tubb, released in 1965 (see 1965 in music). It reached number 15 on the Billboard Country Albums chart.

== Track listing ==
1. "Big City" (Paul Williams, Sam Humphrey)
2. "Wild Side of Life" (William Warren, Arlie A. Carter)
3. "I Wonder Where You Are Tonight" (Johnny Bond)
4. "Beggar to a King" (J. P. Richardson)
5. "Before I'm Over You" (Betty Sue Perry)
6. "Each Night at Nine" (Floyd Tillman)
7. "Fraulein" (Lawton Williams)
8. "When Two Worlds Collide" (Roger Miller, Bill Anderson)
9. "I've Got a Tiger By the Tail" (Harlan Howard, Buck Owens)
10. "She Called Me Baby" (Harlan Howard)
11. "Tell Her So" (Glen D. Tubb)
12. "Don't Be Angry" (Wade Jackson)

== Personnel ==
- Ernest Tubb – vocals, guitar
- Cal Smith – guitar
- Leon Rhodes – guitar
- Grady Martin – guitar
- Buddy Charleton – pedal steel guitar
- Gary Shook – guitar, bass
- Jack Drake – bass
- Jack Greene – drums
- Hargus "Pig" Robbins – piano
- Jerry Smith – piano

== Chart positions ==
Chart (1965)	Position
Billboard Country Albums	15
