= Bubbles in My Beer =

Single by Bob Wills
- B-side: "Spanish Fandango"
- Released: December 8, 1947
- Recorded: October 30, 1947
- Genre: Western swing
- Label: MGM Records 10116
- Songwriters: T. Duncan, C. Walker, B. Wills

"Bubbles in My Beer" is a Western swing song that was originally recorded by Bob Wills and His Texas Playboys in 1947. It later became a standard that has been performed by many country music artists. One critic of drinking songs ranks it number 20, calls it "the ultimate self-pity song," and credits it with "setting the tone for a whole genre of songs about drowning sorrows in the barroom."

The song's origins are the subject of different accounts (see Tommy Duncan for one); but there is agreement that Texas Playboys vocalist Duncan came up with the song's title and refrain, at which point songwriter Cindy Walker became involved. Walker has been quoted as saying: "If you can get a real good title, you’ve got something. I always write from the title. I’ve never written a song without the title."

== Chart performance ==
Chart (1948)	Peak position
U.S. Billboard Most-Played Juke Box Folk Records	4

In 1971, a cover version by Ray Pennington peaked at number 68 on Billboard's U.S. country singles chart.

== Album versions ==
"Bubbles in My Beer" has appeared on albums by Bob Wills and several other notable country artists. The following list excludes compilations:

- Hank Thompson, Dance Ranch (1958)
- Bob Wills, Mr. Words & Mr. Music (1961)
- Ray Price, San Antonio Rose (1962)
- George Jones, George Jones Sings Bob Wills (1962)
- Charlie Walker, Born to Lose (1966)
- Ernest Tubb, Baby It's So Hard to Be Good (1972)
- Willie Nelson, Shotgun Willie (1973)
- Bob Wills, For the Last Time (1974)
- Johnny Gimble, Texas Honky-Tonk Hits (1988)
- Jon Langford and the Pine Valley Cosmonauts, Salute the Majesty of Bob Wills (1998)
- Willie Nelson, You Don't Know Me: The Songs of Cindy Walker (2006)

== Appearances in media ==
Bob Wills's version of "Bubbles in My Beer" appeared in the 2018 video game Fallout 76 on one of the in-game radio stations.
