= I'll Go On Alone =

Single by Marty Robbins
- B-side: "You're Breaking My Heart"
- Released: October 10, 1952
- Studio: Jim Beck Studio, Dallas, Texas
- Genre: Country
- Length: 2:39
- Label: Columbia 21022
- Songwriter(s): Marty Robbins

Marty Robbins singles chronology
"Crying 'Cause I Love You" (1952)	"I'll Go On Alone" (1952)	"I Couldn't Keep from Crying" (1953)

"I'll Go On Alone" is a song written and recorded by American country music artist Marty Robbins. Performers on the song include Slim Harbert on bass, Johnny Gimble on fiddle, Floyd Lanning on guitar, and Harold Carmack on piano. The song was recorded at Jim Beck's studio.

== Chart performance ==
The song reached number one on the US country chart in 1952. It was Robbins' first hit single.

== Other versions ==
- Webb Pierce released a version of the song as a single in 1953. It reached number four on the country chart.
- Bobby Lord released a version of the song as B-side to his single "My Heart Tells Me So" in 1961.
- Bob Luman released a version as part of an EP in the United Kingdom in 1964.
- Ernest Tubb released a version of the song on his 1969 album, Let's Turn Back the Years.
