= Ernest Tubb (album) =

Studio album by Ernest Tubb
- Released: August 1975
- Recorded: March 1975
- Studio: Bradley's Barn, Mount Juliet, Tennessee
- Genre: Country, Honky tonk
- Label: MCA
- Producer: Owen Bradley

Ernest Tubb chronology
I've Got All the Heartaches I Can Handle (1973)	Ernest Tubb (1975)	The Legend and the Legacy (1979)

Ernest Tubb is an album by American country singer Ernest Tubb, released in 1975 (see 1975 in music).

== Track listing ==
1. "I've Got All the Heartaches I Can Handle" (Shel Silverstein)
2. "If You Don't Quit Checkin' on Me (I'm Checking Out on You)" (Larry Cheshier, Murry Kellum)
3. "Busiest Memory in Town" (Geoff Morgan)
4. "I'm Living in Sunshine" (Jimmie Rodgers)
5. "You're My Best Friend" (Wayland Holyfield)
6. "It's Time to Pay the Fiddler" (Don Wayne, Walter Haynes)
7. "She's Already Gone" (Jim Mundy)
8. "I'd Like to Live It Again" (Smokey Stover)
9. "Door Is Always Open" (Bob McDill, Dickey Lee)
10. "Somewhere County Somewhere City USA" (Chris Stevenson)
11. "Holding Things Together" (Merle Haggard)

== Personnel ==
- Ernest Tubb – vocals, guitar
- Pete Michaud – guitar
- Charlie Hammond – guitar
- Howard Owsley – pedal steel guitar
- Henry Dunlap – piano
- Owen Bradley – piano
- Johnny Gimble – fiddle
- Harold Bradley – bass
- David Evan – bass
- Don Mills – drums

== Chart positions ==
Chart (1975)	Position
Billboard Country Albums	45
