= By Request =

By Request may refer to:

- By Request (Boyzone album), 1999
- By Request (Brenda Lee album), 1964
- By Request (Ernest Tubb album), 1966
- By Request (George Jones album), 1984
- By Request (Perry Como album), 1962
- By Request, 1975 album by Wendy Carlos
- By Request, a 1928 romance novel by Ethel M. Dell
