= At the First Fall of Snow =

Single by Hank Williams
- B-side: "Someday You'll Call My Name"
- Released: 1955
- Recorded: August 1948–May 1949, Shreveport
- Genre: Country, gospel
- Length: 3:11
- Label: MGM
- Songwriter: Lorene Rose

"At the First Fall of Snow" is a song written by Lorene Rose. It is primarily associated with Hank Williams, who recorded it at WWKH in Shreveport, Louisiana as part of the Johnnie Fair Syrup program between August 1948 and May 1949. The surviving acetates feature Williams accompanied by his own guitar singing many of his favorite songs by Ernest Tubb, Gene Autry, and Roy Acuff, among others. MGM obtained the rights to the acetates and "At the First Fall of Snow" was released as a single in September 1955 with "Someday You'll Call My Name" as the B-side. By February 1956 it had sold thirty thousand copies.

Hank Snow covered the song for RCA. Rose Maddox also recorded the song for Capitol Records.
