= Try Me One More Time =

Try Me One More Time may refer to:

- Try Me One More Time (album), a 2007 album by David Bromberg
- Try Me One More Time (song), a 1946 single by Ernest Tubb
