= Yellow Rose of Texas (box set) =

Box set by Ernest Tubb
- Released: 1993
- Recorded: January 1954 – December 1960
- Genres: Country, Honky tonk
- Length: 386:10
- Label: Bear Family
- Producers: Paul Cohen, Owen Bradley

Ernest Tubb chronology
Let's Say Goodbye Like We Said Hello (1991)	Yellow Rose of Texas (1993)	Walking the Floor Over You (1996)

Yellow Rose of Texas is a box set of Ernest Tubb recordings from 1954 to 1960, released in 1993. It is a 5-CD box set and contains 150 songs. The set includes extensive liner notes, session notes and photographs.

Four songs include The Wilburn Brothers. Members of Tubb's backing and recording bands during these years included such musicians as Floyd Cramer, Grady Martin, Buddy Harman, Hank Garland, Billy Byrd, Dale Potter and Leon Rhodes.

== Reception ==
Professional ratings
Review scores
Source	Rating
Allmusic	4.5/5 stars

In his Allmusic review, Bruce Eder describes Disc Two as "...more consistent in tone and content, mixing blues and midtempo ballads, most of which are compiled here for the very first time, including four priceless cuts pairing Tubb off with the Wilburn Brothers.

== Personnel ==
- Ernest Tubb – vocals, guitar
- Doyle Wilburn – vocals
- Teddy Wilburn – vocals
- Owen Bradley – piano
- Floyd Cramer – piano
- Billy Byrd – guitar
- J.K. Wilson – guitar
- Hank Garland – guitar
- Grady Martin – guitar
- Leon Rhodes – guitar
- Dale Potter – fiddle
- Farris Coursey – drums
- Buddy Harman – drums
- Billy "Bun" Wilson – drums
- Jack Drake – bass
- Pete Drake – steel guitar
- Bobby Garrett – steel guitar
- Dickie Harris – steel guitar
- Thomas Lee Jackson Jr. – fiddle
- The Jordanaires – background vocals
- Anita Kerr Singers – background vocals

Production notes:

- Owen Bradley – producer
- Paul Cohen – producer
- Richard Weize – tape research
- Matt Tunia – tape research
- Bob Jones – mastering
- John Strother – mixing
- Mark Wilder – disc transfers
- Randy Aronson – tape research
- R.A. Andreas – photography, illustrations
- Jerry Strobel – photography, illustrations
