= I've Got All the Heartaches I Can Handle =

Studio album by Ernest Tubb
- Released: 1973
- Genres: Country, Honky tonk
- Label: Decca

Ernest Tubb chronology
Baby It's So Hard to Be Good (1972)	I've Got All the Heartaches I Can Handle (1973)	Ernest Tubb (1975)

I've Got All the Heartaches I Can Handle is an album by American country singer Ernest Tubb, released in 1973 (see 1973 in music).

== Track listing ==
1. "I've Got All the Heartaches I Can Handle" (Shel Silverstein)
2. "Texas Troubadour" (Porter Wagoner)
3. "Missing in Action" (Helen Kays, Arthur Q. Smith)
4. "Don't She Look Good" (Jerry Chesnut)
5. "Daisy a Day" (Jud Strunk)
6. "Texas Dance Hall Girl" (Justin Tubb)
7. "Miles in Memorie" (Ernest Tubb, Cal Story)
8. "Lord Knows I'm Drinking" (Bill Anderson)
9. "Pass Me By (If You're Only Passing Through)" (Hillman Hall)
10. "What My Woman Can't Do" (George Jones, Earl Montgomery, Billy Sherrill)
11. "Last Letter" (Rex Griffin)
