= The Ernest Tubb Story =

Compilation album by Ernest Tubb
- Released: September 1959
- Recorded: 1958–59
- Studio: Bradley Studios, Nashville, Tennessee
- Genre: Country, honky tonk
- Label: Decca
- Producer: Owen Bradley

Ernest Tubb chronology
The Importance of Being Ernest (1959)	The Ernest Tubb Story (1959)	Ernest Tubb Record Shop (1960)

The Ernest Tubb Story is an album by American country singer Ernest Tubb, released in 1959 (see 1959 in music). It was originally released as a double-LP album.

The album consists of all previously released material that was re-recorded in stereo. It is out of print but most of the songs are available on various Tubb compilations and are taken from these versions.

== Reception ==
Professional ratings
Review scores
Source	Rating
AllMusic	4/5 stars

In his AllMusic review, Bruce Eder wrote of the album "Some of the best work here, however, is on the Tubb solo vocal tracks such as "Blue Christmas." By this time, Tubb's voice had mellowed and softened to a rich, highly flexible baritone, more expressive than it had ever been before."

== Track listing ==
1. "I'll Get Along Somehow" (Ernest Tubb)
2. "Slipping Around" (Floyd Tillman)
3. "Filipino Baby" (Billy Cox, Clarke Van Ness)
4. "When the World Has Turned You Down" (Tubb)
5. "Have You Ever Been Lonely (Have You Ever Been Blue)" (George Brown, Peter De Rose)
6. "There's a Little Bit of Everything in Texas" (Tubb)
7. "Walking the Floor Over You" (Tubb)
8. "Driftwood on the River" (Bob Miller, John Klenner)
9. "There's Nothing More to Say" (Tubb)
10. "Rainbow at Midnight" (Lost John Miller)
11. "I'll Always Be Glad to Take You Back" (Tubb)
12. "Let's Say Goodbye Like We Said Hello" (Tubb, Jimmie Skinner)
13. "Careless Darlin'" (Tubb, Bob Shelton, Lou Wayne)
14. "Don't Rob Another Man's Castle" (Jenny Lou Carson)
15. "I Wonder Why You Said Goodbye" (Tubb)
16. "Last Night I Dreamed" (Tubb)
17. "Letters Have No Arms" (Cindy Walker)
18. "Though the Days Were Only Seven" (Tubb, Ruth Smith)
19. "I Love You Because" (Leon Payne)
20. "You Nearly Lose Your Mind" (Tubb)
21. "I Will Miss You When You Go" (Tubb, Henry Stewart)
22. "It's Been So Long, Darling" (Tubb)
23. "Tomorrow Never Comes" (Tubb, Johnny Bond)
24. "Blue Christmas" (Billy Hayes, Jay W. Johnson)

== Personnel ==
- Ernest Tubb – vocals, guitar
- Billy Byrd – guitar
- Grady Martin – guitar
- Howard Johnson – guitar
- Buddy Emmons – pedal steel guitar
- Jack Drake – bass
- Farris Coursey – drums
- Tommy Jackson – fiddle
- Floyd Cramer – piano
- The Jordanaires – background vocals
- Anita Kerr Singers – background vocals
