= The Daddy of 'Em All =

Studio album by Ernest Tubb
- Released: July 1957
- Recorded: June 12–14, 1956
- Studio: Music City Recording (Nashville, Tennessee)
- Genre: Country, honky tonk
- Label: Decca
- Producer: Paul Cohen

Ernest Tubb chronology
Red and Ernie (1956)	The Daddy of 'Em All (1957)	The Importance of Being Ernest (1959)

The Daddy of 'Em All is an album by American country singer Ernest Tubb, released in 1957.

== Reception ==
Professional ratings
Review scores
Source	Rating
AllMusic	4.5/5 stars

In his AllMusic review, Bruce Eder called The Daddy of 'Em All "... one of the great honky tonk long-players of its era."

== Track listing ==
1. "You're Breaking My Heart" (H. H. Melka)
2. "I Dreamed of an Old Love Affair" (Jimmie Davis, Bonnie Dodd, Charles Mitchell)
3. "I Know My Baby Loves Me in Her Own Peculiar Way" (Riley Shepard, Don Canton)
4. "Mississippi Gal" (Taylor McPeters, Daniel Cypert, Sam Nicols)
5. "When a Soldier Knocks and Finds Nobody Home" (Ernest Tubb, Moon Mullican, Lou Wayne)
6. "Daisy Mae" (Floyd Tillman)
7. "I've Got the Blues for Mammy" (Hy Heath, William Daugherty)
8. "This Troubled Friend of Mine" (Billy Hughes, Johnny Tyler)
9. "I Knew the Moment I Lost You" (Bob Wills, Tommy Duncan)
10. "You're the Only Good Thing" (Jack Toombs, Chuck Gregory)
11. "My Hillbilly Baby" (Rex Griffin)
12. "There's No Fool Like a Young Fool" (Bette Thomasson)

== Personnel ==
- Ernest Tubb – vocals, guitar
- Billy Byrd – guitar
- Rusty Gabbard – pedal steel guitar
- Jack Drake – bass
- Buddy Harman – drums
- Tommy Jackson – fiddle
- Owen Bradley – piano
- Floyd Cramer – piano
