= Ernest Tubb Record Shop =

Studio album by Ernest Tubb
- Released: 1960
- Recorded: 1960
- Studio: Bradley Studios, Nashville, Tennessee
- Genre: Country, honky tonk
- Label: Decca
- Producer: Owen Bradley

Ernest Tubb chronology
The Ernest Tubb Story (1959)	Ernest Tubb Record Shop (1960)	Ernest Tubb and His Texas Troubadours (1960)

Ernest Tubb Record Shop is an album by American country singer Ernest Tubb, released in 1960 (see 1960 in music). It is named after Tubb's record shop in Nashville.

== Reception ==
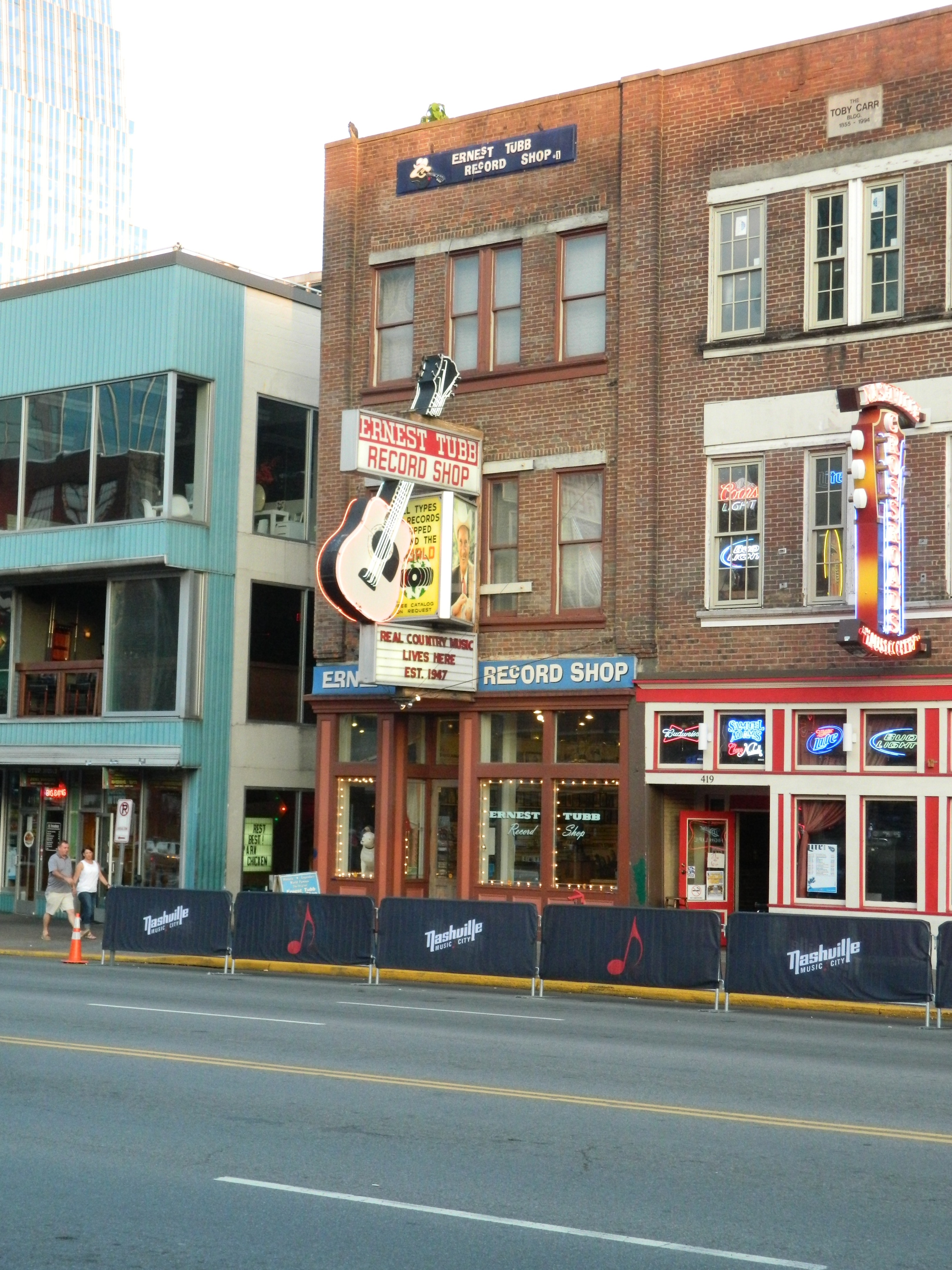
Ernest Tubb Record Shop, Nashville, Tennessee

Professional ratings
Review scores
Source	Rating
AllMusic	3/5 stars

In his AllMusic review, Eugene Chadbourne wrote of the album "There are records by this artist that are a bit more inspired and feature even better instrumental lineups. But this one really should satisfy any kind of fan of country music..."

== The record shop ==
From 1947 to 2022, the Ernest Tubb Record Shop was situated at 417 Broadway in Nashville. There were several other shops throughout the years that included Music Valley in Nashville, Pigeon Forge, Tennessee, and Fort Worth, Texas, but the location on Broadway in Nashville was the last remaining store open. It was the location of the inaugural Music City News Awards, the oldest MTV awards show ceremony that MTV acquired in 2000, as well as the Midnite Jamboree, WSM's late-night weekly program that aired after the Grand Ole Opry. On March 11, 2022, the owners of the Broadway location announced it would close and sell the shop and the intellectual property in the spring, ultimately doing so after a 75th anniversary celebration on May 3. A consortium including Tubb's grandson Dale purchased the rights and eventually reopened the store and revived the Midnite Jamboree.

== Track listing ==
1. "Do It Now" (Jimmie Dallas)
2. "He'll Have to Go" (Joe Allison, Audrey Allison)
3. "Mister Blues" (Jack Toombs)
4. "You Win Again" (Hank Williams)
5. "I Believe I'm Entitled to You" (Mel Foree, Cliff Carlisle, Chester Rice)
6. "Who Will Buy the Wine?" (Billy Mize)
7. "White Silver Sands" (Charles G. Matthews, Gladys Reinhardt)
8. "Am I That Easy to Forget?" (Carl Belew, W. S. Stevenson)
9. "A Guy Named Joe" (Harlan Howard)
10. "Kind of Love She Gave to Me" (Mae Boren Axton, Glenn Reeves)
11. "Pick Me Up on Your Way Down" (Harlan Howard)
12. "Why I'm Walkin'" (Melvin Endsley, Stonewall Jackson)

== Personnel ==
- Ernest Tubb – vocals, guitar
- Howard Johnson – guitar
- Grady Martin – guitar
- Buddy Emmons – pedal steel guitar, guitar
- Bobby Garrett – pedal steel guitar
- Jack Drake – bass
- Farris Coursey – drums
- Buddy Harman – drums
- Floyd Cramer – piano
