= Midnite Jamboree =

Long-running radio programme in the USA

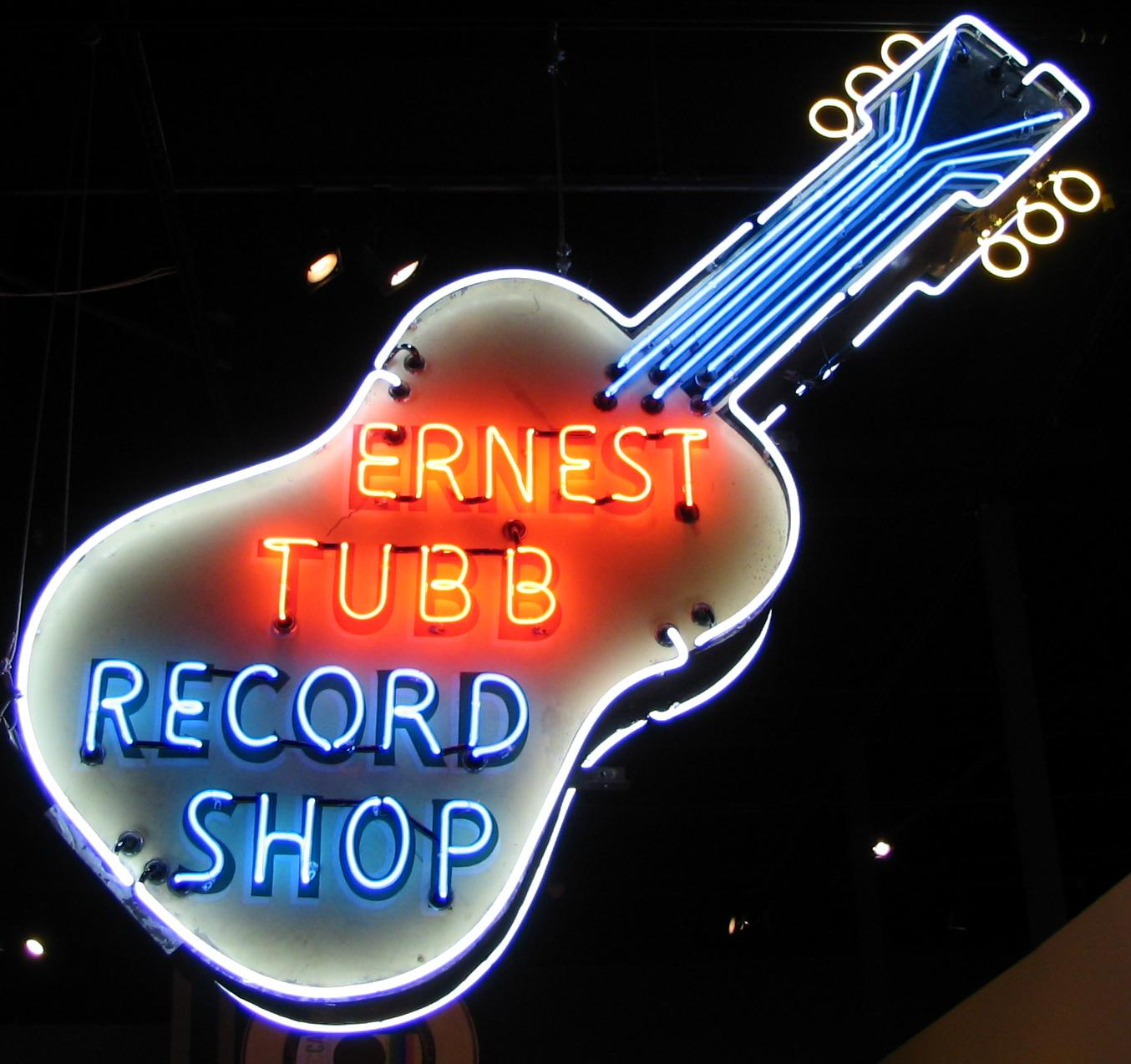
- The Midnite Jamboree was originally broadcast from a stage inside Ernest Tubb Record Shop (sign pictured).
- Country of origin: United States
- Language: English
- Home station: WSM
- Created by: Ernest Tubb
- Recording studio: 720 Commerce (1947-1951); 417 Broadway (1951-1976, 2021-2022); Demonbreun St (1976-1979); Music Valley Drive (1979-1995); Texas Troubadour Theatre (1995–2022, 2024); WSM Studios (2022-2026)
- Original release: May 3, 1947 – January 2026

The Midnite Jamboree was a radio program that has aired on WSM in Nashville, Tennessee from May 3, 1947 to January 2026. It was launched by country musician Ernest Tubb. The program was recorded from Ernest Tubb Record Shop in Nashville, Tennessee each Saturday. Through a brokered programming arrangement with Ernest Tubb Record Shop, the Jamboree aired following the Grand Ole Opry; as the program's name implied, it aired at midnight Central Time.

In its later years, the Midnite Jamboree was falsely billed as "the second longest running radio show in history," a claim that remained on the WSM web site up until the program's end.

In recent years, the show has been recorded at 10pm on Saturday night and played on WSM one week later at midnight on Sunday morning. Archived episodes occasionally air on the occasion that a new episode is not produced.

Production of the show has been intermittent since 2015 due to financial troubles, ownership disputes, renovations at the show's home stage and the COVID-19 pandemic. The most recent incarnation of the series was under the co-ownership of Tubb's grandson Dale from 2022 to 2026.

== Show format ==
The Midnite Jamboree begins each episode with the theme song "Walking the Floor Over You" by the show's namesake Ernest Tubb, followed by playing a record from Jimmie C. Rodgers. The remainder of the show is devoted to a single country music act, who plays a set lasting approximately an hour. Many of the acts play a shorter set at the Grand Ole Opry earlier in the night before playing a full set at the Midnite Jamboree. The set is periodically interrupted to play songs from featured albums on sale at the record shop. The Midnite Jamboree was particularly known for focusing on traditional country/western and bluegrass music, avoiding contemporary acts because it believed that the older styles were what audiences wanted to see.

== History ==
The Midnite Jamboree has had several homes from its inception in 1947 through 2022. The show's first home was at the original Ernest Tubb Record Shop at 720 Commerce Street, which opened May 3, 1947. In 1951, the store and the radio program moved to 417 Broadway and this location became the show's most famous home, hosting the show from 1951 until 1976. On June 2, 1976, a second Ernest Tubb Record Shop was opened on Demonbreun street in Nashville and it became the home of the Jamboree on June 12, 1976. In May 1979, another store was built at Music Valley Drive near Opryland, and this store became the home of the Jamboree from 1979 until January 1995. In January 1995, a new Ernest Tubb Record Shop and Texas Troubadour Theater were opened in Music Valley Village. In January 1995, the show moved to the Texas Troubadour Theatre, closer to the current Grand Ole Opry House. It briefly shut down in March and April 2015 due to financial shortfalls; the program had never been profitable, but declines in record sales had made keeping the show up and running unsustainable. In an effort to draw larger crowds, the previously live program—airing at midnight Central Time—shifted to earlier in the evening, as there was little to do in that section of Nashville between the time the Opry ended and the Jamboree began. In July 2021, following a pandemic hiatus in which WSM aired reruns of the program, the show returned to Ernest Tubb Record Shop at 417 Broadway. The move also coincided with the departure of Jennifer Herron, the show's host of 17 years.

On March 11, 2022, the owners of Ernest Tubb Record Shop announced that it would be going out of business in the spring, ending the program.

In the summer of 2022, WSM occupied the former time slot with occasional specials from JesseLee Jones's other music venues in Texas and reruns of classic Grand Ole Opry segments. Jones and longtime Tubb associate David McCormick had been involved in a dispute over the record shop at the time that was eventually resolved.

In July 2022, it was announced that an investment group led by Nashville-based real estate investor and developer Brad Bars, Tubb's grandson Ernest Dale Tubb III, and Ilya Toshinskiy, a Russian-born and locally based musician, purchased the Ernest Tubb Record Shop. The Midnite Jamboree returned to the air with new episodes on September 17, 2022, with an episode hosted by Grand Ole Opry legend Jeannie Seely. The episode was taped at The Troubadour (formerly the Texas Troubadour Theater) as a special honoring her 55th anniversary as a member of the Grand Ole Opry. On September 21, The Troubadour's official Facebook page announced that Rhonda Vincent would be hosting a new episode on Saturday, September 24

The Ernest Tubb Record Shop again closed in 2024 to accommodate a long-term renovation project rehabilitating the upper floors of the building at 417 Broadway. The Midnite Jamboree has since changed formats to move away from the long-form live performances to a hosted disc jockey program while the renovations proceed.

In January 2026, two months after holding a grand reopening ceremony, the record shop again shut down following Tusk Brothers' departures, and WSM, though it continued to list the program on its schedule, replaced it over-the-air with reruns of the Opry. The shop quietly reopened in May, but the Jamboree did not return and was finally removed from the WSM schedule.

== See also ==
- List of longest-running radio programmes
