= Walking the Floor Over You (box set) =

Box set by Ernest Tubb
- Released: 1996
- Recorded: October 1946 – December 1947
- Genre: Country, Honky tonk
- Label: Bear Family
- Producer: Paul Cohen, Dave Kapp, Eli Oberstein, Joe Perry; Richard Weize (reissue producer)

Ernest Tubb chronology
Yellow Rose of Texas (1993)	Walking the Floor Over You (1996)

Walking the Floor Over You is a box set of Ernest Tubb's early recordings, released in 1996. It is an eight-CD box set and was released in 1996. It contains 208 songs, many of them are previously unissued on LP or CD. The set includes extensive liner notes, session notes and photographs.

The collection covers Tubb's recordings from 1936 until early 1947. It ranges from Tubb accompanied only by his guitar to the developing of the roots of honkey tonk music.

== Reception ==
Professional ratings
Review scores
Source	Rating
Allmusic	4.5/5 stars

In his Allmusic review, Bruce Eder describes Disc Two as "...where honky tonk comes into the world fully formed, with a comparatively loud, jaunty backup and Tubb's vocals acquiring the smooth, deep, emotive quality that characterized his peak performance. This disc is Ernest Tubb lean and mean, creating a popular music genre as he goes along."

== Personnel ==
- Ernest Tubb – vocals, guitar
- Jerry Byrd – steel guitar
- Bill Drake – guitar
- Jack Drake – bass
- Wayne Fleming – steel guitar
- Ray "Kemo" Head – steel guitar
- Herbert M. Paige – bass, guitar
- Charlie Quirk – guitar
- Johnny Sapp – fiddle
- Melvin Leon Short – guitar
- Merwyn J. Buffington – guitar
- Hal Smith – fiddle
- Jay Smith – guitar, steel guitar
- Eddie Tudor – guitar
- Zeke Turner – guitar
- Wesley Tuttle – bass

Production notes:

- Paul Cohen – producer
- Dave Kapp – producer
- Eli Oberstein – producer
- Joe Perry – producer
- Richard Weize – liner notes, reissue producer, research
- Steve Lasker – research, disc transfers, metal transfers
- Alan Stoker – research, disc transfers, metal transfers
- Ronnie Pugh Liner Notes, Discography, Biographical Information
- Adam Skeaping – mastering
- Kevin Coffey – photography, illustrations
- R.A. Andreas – photography, illustrations
- Jerry Strobel – photography, illustrations
- Elaine Tubb – photography, illustrations
- Sylke Holtrop – artwork, illustrations
- Gerd Weiler – artwork, illustrations
- Richard Ihnaton Wiez – discography
- Larry Zwisohn – liner notes, discography
