= One Sweet Hello =

Studio album by Ernest Tubb
- Released: September 1971
- Recorded: December 1970 – May 1971
- Studio: Bradley's Barn, Mount Juliet, Tennessee
- Genre: Country, Honky tonk
- Label: Decca
- Producer: Owen Bradley

Ernest Tubb chronology
Good Year for the Wine (1970)	One Sweet Hello (1971)	Say Something Nice to Sarah (1972)

One Sweet Hello is an album by American country singer Ernest Tubb, released in 1971 (see 1971 in music).

Professional ratings
Review scores
Source	Rating
AllMusic	3.5/5 stars

== Track listing ==
1. "One Sweet Hello" (Merle Haggard)
2. "When Ole Goin' Gets a Goin'" (Eddie Miller)
3. "Commercial Affection" (Mel Tillis)
4. "Key's in the Mailbox" (Harlan Howard)
5. "Help Me Make It Through the Night" (Kris Kristofferson)
6. "She Goes Walking Through My Mind" (Bill Eldridge, Gary Stewart, Walter Haynes)
7. "Don't Back a Man up in a Corner" (Howard)
8. "As Long as There's a Sunday" (Justin Tubb)
9. "Sometimes You Just Can't Win" (Smokey Stover)
10. "Touching Home" (Dallas Frazier, Arthur Leo Owens)
11. "Shenandoah Waltz" (Clyde Moody, Chubby Wise)

== Personnel ==
- Ernest Tubb – vocals, guitar
- Jack Mollette – guitar
- Ray Edenton – guitar
- Buddy Charleton – pedal steel guitar
- Joe Pruneda – bass
- Harold Bradley – bass
- Sonny Lonas – drums
- Jerry Smith – piano
- Hargus "Pig" Robbins – piano
- Leon Boulanger – fiddle
