= Just Call Me Lonesome (Ernest Tubb album) =

Studio album by Ernest Tubb
- Released: June 1963
- Recorded: April–June 1962
- Studio: Columbia (Nashville, Tennessee)
- Genre: Country, honky tonk
- Label: Decca
- Producer: Owen Bradley

Ernest Tubb chronology
On Tour (1962)	Just Call Me Lonesome (1963)	The Family Bible (1963)

Just Call Me Lonesome is an album by American country singer Ernest Tubb, released in 1963 (see 1963 in music).

Professional ratings
Review scores
Source	Rating
AllMusic	4.5/5 stars

== Track listing ==
All songs by Rex Griffin unless otherwise noted.

1. "I Told You So" (Rex Griffin, Jimmie Davis)
2. "I Loved You Once" (Griffin, Davis)
3. "Just an Old Faded Photograph"
4. "Last Letter"
5. "If You Call That Gone Goodbye"
6. "How Can I Be Sure" (Griffin, Ernest Tubb)
7. "I'll Never Tell You I Love You"
8. "Beyond the Last Mile"
9. "Just Partners"
10. "I Think I'll Give Up (It's All Over)"
11. "I'm as Free as the Breeze" (Griffin, Tubb)
12. "Just Call Me Lonesome"

== Personnel ==
- Ernest Tubb – vocals, guitar
- Johnny Johnson – guitar
- Leon Rhodes – guitar
- Grady Martin – guitar
- Buddy Charleton – pedal steel guitar
- Tommy Jackson – fiddle
- Jack Drake – bass
- Harold Bradley – bass
- Bob Steele – drums
- Jan Kurtis – drums
- Floyd Cramer – piano
