= Country Hits Old and New =

Studio album by Ernest Tubb
- Released: October 1966
- Recorded: February–April 1966
- Studio: RCA Studio B (Nashville, Tennessee)
- Genre: Country, Honky tonk
- Label: Decca
- Producer: Owen Bradley

Ernest Tubb chronology
By Request (1966)	Country Hits Old and New (1966)	Another Story (1967)

Country Hits Old and New is an album by American country singer Ernest Tubb, released in 1966 (see 1966 in music).

Professional ratings
Review scores
Source	Rating
AllMusic	3/5 stars

== Track listing ==
1. "Memphis Tennessee" (Chuck Berry)
2. "Before I Met You" (Charles L. Seitz, Joe Lewis, Elmar Rader)
3. "Tennessee Waltz" (Pee Wee King, Redd Stewart)
4. "Fireball Mail" (Floyd Jenkins)
5. "Under Your Spell Again" (Buck Owens, Dusty Rhodes)
6. "I'm Gonna Tie One on Tonight" (Lee Nichols)
7. "Remember Me (When the Candle Lights are Gleaming)" (Scott Wiseman)
8. "I Hung My Head and Cried" (Jimmie Davis, Cliff Bruner)
9. "Holdin' Hands" (George Henkel, Tex Fletcher, Viola Gordon)
10. "No Matter What Happens My Darling" (Johnny Lange, Lou Porter)
11. "Waitin' in Your Welfare Line" (Buck Owens, Don Rich, Nat Stuckey)
12. "May the Bird of Paradise Fly Up Your Nose" (Neal Merritt)

== Personnel ==
- Ernest Tubb – vocals, guitar
- Leon Rhodes – guitar
- Jerry Shook – guitar, bass
- Cal Smith – guitar
- Buddy Charleton – pedal steel guitar
- Jack Drake – bass
- Jack Greene – drums
- Willie Ackerman – drums
- Moon Mullican – piano
- Jerry Smith – piano

== Chart positions ==
Chart (1966)	Position
Billboard Country Albums	35
