= Hittin' the Road (Ernest Tubb album) =

Studio album by Ernest Tubb
- Released: November 1965
- Recorded: April–June 1965
- Studio: RCA Studio B (Nashville, Tennessee)
- Genre: Country, Honky tonk
- Label: Decca
- Producer: Owen Bradley

Ernest Tubb chronology
My Pick of the Hits (1965)	Hittin' the Road (1965)	Stand by Me (1966)

Hittin' the Road is an album by American country singer Ernest Tubb, released in 1965 (see 1965 in music).

Professional ratings
Review scores
Source	Rating
AllMusic	3/5 stars

== Track listing ==
1. "Give Me a Little Old Fashioned Love" (Ernest Tubb)
2. "I'm a Sad Lonely Man" (Glenn Raye, Ralph Davis)
3. "Cocoanut Grove" (Harry Owens)
4. "All My Friends Are Gonna Be Strangers" (Liz Anderson)
5. "Throw Your Love My Way" (Tubb, Loys Southerland)
6. "Afraid to Care" (Jack Greene, Ken Campbell)
7. "Honeymoon With the Blues" (Eddie Noack, Walt Breeland)
8. "I'm With a Crowd But So Alone" (Tubb, Carl Story)
9. "Precious Little Baby" (Lee Roberts)
10. "Big Beaver" (Bob Wills)
11. "What Am I Bid" (Leon Rhodes, Clay Allen)
12. "That's When It's Coming Home to You" (Tubb, Lois Snapp)

== Personnel ==
- Ernest Tubb – vocals, guitar
- Cal Smith – guitar
- Leon Rhodes – guitar
- Jerry Shook – guitar, bass
- Buddy Charleton – pedal steel guitar
- Jack Drake – bass
- Jack Greene – drums
- Jerry Smith – piano
