= Midnight Jamboree =

Studio album by Ernest Tubb
- Released: 1960
- Genre: Country, honky tonk
- Label: Decca

Ernest Tubb chronology
Ernest Tubb and His Texas Troubadours (1960)	Midnight Jamboree (1960)	All Time Hits (1960)

Midnight Jamboree is an album by American country singer Ernest Tubb, released in 1960 (see 1960 in music). It also includes performances by Kitty Wells, Webb Pierce, Patsy Cline, and The Wilburn Brothers. It is out of print, although it was later released on CD.

Professional ratings
Review scores
Source	Rating
AllMusic	2.5/5 stars

== Track listing ==
1. "Walking the Floor Over You" (Ernest Tubb)
2. "Same Thing as Me" (Tubb)
3. "I Only Meant to Borrow Not to Steal" (Pat Twitty, Teddy Wilburn)
4. "Boy With a Future" (Harlan Howard)
5. "I Hate to See You Go" (Tubb, Homer Hargrove)
6. "Hands You're Holding Now" (Marty Robbins)
7. "Rose City Chimes" (Bobby Garrett)
8. "I'm Sorry Now" (Cliff Johnson)
9. "Pass Me By (If You're Only Passing Through)" (H. B. Hall)
10. "Sweet Lips"
11. "I Want You to Know I Love You" (Cindy Walker)
12. "Shoes"
13. "It Is No Secret"
