= Stand by Me (Ernest Tubb album) =

Studio album by Ernest Tubb
- Released: November 1965
- Genre: Country, honky tonk, gospel
- Label: Vocalion

Ernest Tubb chronology
Hittin' the Road (1965)	Stand by Me (1965)	By Request (1966)

Stand by Me is a gospel album by American country singer Ernest Tubb, released in 1966 (see 1966 in music).

== Track listing ==
1. "When Jesus Calls" (Willie Phelps)
2. "The Old Rugged Cross" (George Bennard)
3. "When I Take My Vacation in Heaven" (Herbert Buffum, R.E. Winsett)
4. "Farther Along" (Traditional)
5. "May the Good Lord Bless and Keep You" (Meredith Willson)
6. "Stand by Me" (Charles Albert Tindley)
7. "I Met a Friend" (Charles Fay Smith)
8. "When It's Prayer Meeting Time in the Hollow" (Al Rice, Fleming Allan)
9. "The Wonderful City" (Elsie McWilliams, Jimmie Rodgers)
10. "What a Friend We Have in Jesus" (Charles Crozat Converse, Joseph M. Scriven)
