= Careless Darlin' =

Single by Ernest Tubb
- Released: 1944
- Genre: Country
- Label: Decca
- Songwriters: Ernest Tubb, Lou Wayne, Bob Shelton

"Careless Darlin" is a country music song written by Ernest Tubb, Lou Wayne, and Bob Shelton, and performed by Tubb. It was released in 1944 on the Decca label (catalog no. 6110A) with "Are You Waiting Just For Me" as the "B" side. It peaked in 1945 at No. 3 on the Billboard country and western chart and remained on the chart for eight weeks.

The song's lyrics tell of how carlessly his darling broke her vow. He kept his promise and his vow, but his careless darlin' was untrue, and she carlessly threw his love away.

The song was later covered by Tex Ritter, Little Jimmy Dickens, Jack Guthrie, and Eddie Dean. Tubb's version was later included on multiple compilation albums, including "The Ernest Tubb Story" (1959), "Walking the Floor Over You" (1996), "The Definitive Ernest Tubbs Collection" (2001), and "The Texas Troubadour" (2003).
