= Let's Turn Back the Years (album) =

Studio album by Ernest Tubb
- Released: November 1969
- Recorded: March–April 1969
- Studio: Bradley's Barn, Mount Juliet, Tennessee
- Genre: Country, honky tonk
- Label: Decca
- Producer: Owen Bradley

Ernest Tubb chronology
Country Hit Time (1968)	Let's Turn Back the Years (1969)	If We Put Our Heads Together (1969)

Professional ratings
Review scores
Source	Rating
AllMusic	3/5 stars

Let's Turn Back the Years is an album by American country singer Ernest Tubb, released in 1969.

== Track listing ==
1. "Let's Turn Back the Years" (Hank Williams)
2. "I Need Attention Bad" (Ernest Tubb, Baba Stewart)
3. "Yesterday's Tears" (Tubb)
4. "I'm Free at Last" (Lewis G. Candys)
5. "Give My Love to Rose" (Johnny Cash)
6. "Send Me the Pillow That You Dream On" (Hank Locklin)
7. "Blue Eyed Elaine" (Tubb)
8. "Our Baby's Book" (Tubb)
9. "I'll Go On Alone" (Marty Robbins)
10. "Today" (Hank Thompson)
11. "You Won't Ever Forget Me" (Tubb, Lois Snapp)

== Personnel ==
- Ernest Tubb – vocals, guitar
- Billy Parker – guitar
- Steve Chapman – guitar
- Buddy Charleton – pedal steel guitar
- Noel Stanley – bass
- Harold Bradley – bass
- James Wilkerson – bass
- Errol Jernigan – drums
- Hargus "Pig" Robbins – piano
- Larry Butler – piano
