= The Importance of Being Ernest =

1959 studio album by Ernest Tubb

Studio album by Ernest Tubb
- Released: January 1959
- Recorded: May–October, 1958
- Studio: Bradley Studios, Nashville, Tennessee
- Genre: Country, honky tonk
- Label: Decca
- Producer: Owen Bradley

Ernest Tubb chronology
Daddy of 'Em All (1957)	The Importance of Being Ernest (1959)	The Ernest Tubb Story (1959)

The Importance of Being Ernest is an album by American country singer Ernest Tubb, released in 1959 (see 1959 in music).

Tubb wrote in his fan club's newsletter "I don't know who dreamed up the title but I hope that it will meet with your approval. Also, I don't like the cover picture and haven't the slightest idea where they got it. I don't believe you will like it either, but I trust that you will like what is inside the cover well enough to make up for this picture and the title. Be sure to write and let me know..."

== Reception ==
Professional ratings
Review scores
Source	Rating
AllMusic	4.0/5 stars

Writing for AllMusic, critic Bruce Eder wrote that the album was "Tubb's first stereo release, and he took well to the new configuration. His voice had softened and mellowed somewhat by this time and, if anything, had a more attractive quality for this material."

== Track listing ==
1. "I'm a Long Gone Daddy" (Hank Williams)
2. "All Those Yesterdays" (Justin Tubb)
3. "San Antonio Rose" (Bob Wills)
4. "That My Darlin' Is Me" (Justin Tubb)
5. "Educated Mama" (Hal Willis, Ginger Willis)
6. "Next Voice You Hear" (Cindy Walker)
7. "I Wonder Why I Worry Over You" (Cindy Walker)
8. "Your Cheatin' Heart" (Hank Williams)
9. "It Makes No Difference Now" (Jimmie Davis, Floyd Tillman)
10. "I'm Waiting for Ships That Never Come In" (Abe Olsen, Jack Yellen)
11. "Don't Trade Your Old Fashioned Sweetheart" (Eddie Noack)
12. "It's the Age That Makes the Difference" (Vernon Claude, George Sherry)

== Personnel ==
- Ernest Tubb – vocals, guitar
- Billy Byrd – guitar
- Grady Martin – guitar
- Howard Johnson – guitar
- Buddy Emmons – pedal steel guitar
- Jack Drake – bass
- Farris Coursey – drums
- Tommy Jackson – fiddle
- Floyd Cramer – piano
