= Good Year for the Wine =

Album by Ernest Tubb

Studio album by Ernest Tubb
- Released: July 1970
- Recorded: March 1969, April 1970
- Studio: Bradley's Barn, Mount Juliet, Tennessee
- Genre: Country, Honky tonk
- Label: Decca
- Producer: Owen Bradley

Ernest Tubb chronology
Saturday Satan Sunday Saint (1969)	Good Year for the Wine (1970)	One Sweet Hello (1971)

Good Year for the Wine is an album by American country singer Ernest Tubb, released in 1970 (see 1970 in music).

== Reception ==
Professional ratings
Review scores
Source	Rating
AllMusic	4/5 stars

In his Allmusic review, Eugene Chadbourne wrote of the album "The gospel of the Tubbites decrees that this wasn't his absolutely number-one best band—not quite—but the well-oiled machine that had become the Texas Troubadors was running perfectly well at this point... This is a vintage Tubb bottle to be sure, despite the presence of a song entitled "It's America (Love It or Leave It)" by one Jimmie Helms. The first side of the album is among the most perfect sides of country music ever recorded."

== Track listing ==
1. "A Good Year for the Wine" (Fred Burch, Tandy Rice) – 2:35
2. "Dear Judge" (Billy Hughes) – 2:43
3. "One Minute Past Eternity" (Stan Kesler, Bill Taylor) – 2:00
4. "When the Grass Grows Over Me" (Don Chapel) – 3:00
5. "Wine Me Up" (B.J. Deaton, Faron Young, Eddie Crandell) – 2:21
6. "I'm So Afraid of Losing You Again" (Dallas Frazier, Arthur Leo Owens) – 2:58
7. "Be Glad" (Kent Westberry, Justin Tubb) – 2:54
8. "It's America (Love It or Leave It)" (Jimmie Helms) – 1:45
9. "Somebody Better Than Me" (Ernest Tubb, Billy Hughes) – 2:49
10. "She's a Little Bit Country" (Harlan Howard) – 2:14
11. "Even the Bad Times Are Good" (Carl Belew, Clyde Pitts) – 2:30

== Personnel ==
- Ernest Tubb – vocals, guitar
- Billy Parker – guitar
- Steve Chapman – guitar
- Buddy Charleton – pedal steel guitar
- Noel Stanley – bass
- Harold Bradley – bass
- James Wilkerson – bass
- Errol Jernigan – drums
- Jerry Smith – piano
- The Jordanaires – background vocals
