= Another Story (Ernest Tubb album) =

Studio album by Ernest Tubb
- Released: April 1967
- Recorded: August 1964–January 1967
- Studio: RCA Studio B (Nashville, Tennessee)
- Genre: Country, Honky tonk
- Label: Decca
- Producer: Owen Bradley

Ernest Tubb chronology
Country Hits Old and New (1966)	Another Story (1967)	Singin' Again (1967)

Another Story is an album by American country singer Ernest Tubb, released in 1967 (see 1967 in music). It is out of print.

Professional ratings
Review scores
Source	Rating
AllMusic	3/5 stars

== Track listing ==
1. "In the Jailhouse Now" (Jimmie Rodgers)
2. "Another Story" (Arlie Duff)
3. "Lots of Luck" (Roger Miller)
4. "Apartment No. 9" (Johnny Paycheck, Bobby Austin)
5. "Loose Talk" (Freddie Hart, Ann Lucas)
6. "Yesterday's Winner Is a Loser Today" (Ernest Tubb, Jesse Rogers, Jimmie Skinner)
7. "Taking It Easy Here" (Ernie Lee)
8. "You Beat All I Ever Saw" (Johnny Cash)
9. "Waltz Across Texas" (Talmadge Tubb)
10. "I Never Had the One I Wanted" (Claude Gray, Jimmy Louis, Sheb Wooley)
11. "There's No Room in My Heart" (Fred Rose, Zeb Turner)
12. "Bring Your Heart Home" (Tom T. Hall)

== Personnel ==
- Ernest Tubb – vocals, guitar
- Leon Rhodes – guitar
- Jerry Shook – guitar, bass
- Harold Bradley – bass
- Cal Smith – guitar
- Steve Chapman – guitar
- Buddy Charleton – pedal steel guitar
- Jack Drake – bass
- Len Miller – drums
- Hargus "Pig" Robbins – piano
- Bill Pursell – piano

== Chart positions ==
Chart (1967)	Position
Billboard Country Albums	6
