= Blue Christmas (Ernest Tubb album) =

Studio album by Ernest Tubb
- Released: 1964
- Genre: Country, honky tonk, Christmas
- Label: Decca

Ernest Tubb chronology
Thanks a Lot (1964)	Blue Christmas (1964)	Mr. & Mrs. Used to Be (1965)

Professional ratings
Review scores
Source	Rating
AllMusic	3/5 stars

Blue Christmas is an album by American country singer Ernest Tubb, released in 1964 (see 1964 in music).

== Track listing ==
1. "Rudolph the Red-Nosed Reindeer" (Johnny Marks)
2. "Blue Snowflakes" (Bill Hayes)
3. "We Need God for Christmas" (Alma F. Donaldson, Ernest Tubb)
4. "Christmas Is Just Another Day" (Harlan Howard)
5. "Christmas Island" (Lyle Moraine)
6. "White Christmas" (Irving Berlin)
7. "Blue Christmas" (Billy Hayes, Jay W. Johnson)
8. "Merry Texas Christmas You All!" (Leon Harris, Bob Miller)
9. "Lonely Christmas Eve" (Buddy Thomton)
10. "I'll Be Walking the Floor This Christmas" (Tubb)
11. "C-H-R-I-S-T-M-A-S" (Eddy Arnold, Jenny Carson)
12. "I'm Trimming My Christmas Tree With Teardrops" (Tubb, Frank Team)
