= Saturday Satan Sunday Saint =

Studio album by Ernest Tubb
- Released: June 1969
- Recorded: December 1968, March 1969
- Studio: Columbia (Nashville, Tennessee)
- Genre: Country, Honky tonk
- Label: Decca
- Producer: Owen Bradley

Ernest Tubb chronology
If We Put Our Heads Together (1969)	Saturday Satan Sunday Saint (1969)	Good Year for the Wine (1970)

Saturday Satan Sunday Saint is an album by American country singer Ernest Tubb, released in 1969 (see 1969 in music).

Professional ratings
Review scores
Source	Rating
AllMusic	3/5 stars

== Track listing ==
1. "She's Looking Better by the Minute" (Jimmie Helms, Grant Townsley)
2. "If I Ever Stop Hurtin'" (Billy Hughes)
3. "Games People Play" (Joe South)
4. "Making Believe" (Jimmy Work)
5. "The Carroll County Accident" (Bob Ferguson)
6. "Just a Drink Away" (Bobby Lewis, Billy Parker)
7. "Saturday Satan Sunday Saint" (Wayne P. Walker)
8. "Today I Started Loving You Again" (Merle Haggard, Bonnie Owens)
9. "Folsom Prison Blues" (Johnny Cash)
10. "Tommy's Doll" (Glenn D. Tubb, Jack Moran)
11. "One More Memory" (Bobby George, Vern Stovall)

== Personnel ==
- Ernest Tubb – vocals, guitar
- Billy Parker – guitar
- Steve Chapman – guitar
- Buddy Charleton – pedal steel guitar
- Noel Stanley – bass
- Harold Bradley – bass
- James Wilkerson – bass
- Errol Jernigan – drums
- Jerry Smith – piano
- The Jordanaires – background vocals

== Chart positions ==
Chart (1969)	Position
Billboard Country Albums	34
