= Our Hearts Are Holding Hands =

Single by Ernest Tubb and Loretta Lynn

from the album Mr. and Mrs. Used to Be
- B-side: "We're Not Kids Anymore"
- Released: May 1965
- Recorded: 1964–1965
- Studio: Columbia, Nashville, Tennessee
- Genre: Country; Honky-tonk
- Length: 2:33
- Label: Decca
- Songwriter: Bill Anderson
- Producer: Owen Bradley

Ernest Tubb singles chronology
"Honky Tonks and You" (1965)	"Our Hearts Are Holding Hands" (1965)	"Waltz Across Texas" (1965)

Loretta Lynn singles chronology
"Blue Kentucky Girl" (1965)	"Our Hearts Are Holding Hands" (1965)	"The Home You're Tearin' Down" (1965)

"Our Hearts Are Holding Hands" is a song written by Bill Anderson that was recorded as a duet by American country artists Ernest Tubb and Loretta Lynn. The song was released as a single in 1965 and became a top 40 single on the Billboard country chart that same year. The song was released on the duo's first duet studio release.

== Background and release ==
"Our Hearts Are Holding Hands" was recorded at the Columbia Recording Studios in Nashville, Tennessee between 1964 and 1965. The sessions were produced by the studio's co-founder, Owen Bradley. Bradley was both artists' producer on the Decca record label in the 1960s also produced their first duet album together.

"Our Hearts Are Holding Hands" was released as a single in May 1965 via Decca Records. It spent a total of 11 weeks on the Billboard Hot Country Singles chart before reaching number 24 in August 1965. "Our Hearts Are Holding Hands" was later released on the duo's first studio album together: Mr. and Mrs. Used to Be. The record was released in August 1965, which was around the same time the single reached its peak position.

== Track listings ==
7" vinyl single

- "We're Not Kids Anymore" – 2:36
- "Our Hearts Are Holding Hands" – 2:33

== Chart performance ==
Chart (1965)	Peak position
US Hot Country Songs (Billboard)	24
