= Baby It's So Hard to Be Good =

Studio album by Ernest Tubb
- Released: 1972
- Genre: Country, Honky tonk
- Label: Decca

Ernest Tubb chronology
Say Something Nice to Sarah (1972)	Baby It's So Hard to Be Good (1972)	I've Got All the Heartaches I Can Handle (1973)

Professional ratings
Review scores
Source	Rating
AllMusic	2/5 stars

Baby It's So Hard to Be Good is an album by American country singer Ernest Tubb, released in 1972.

== Track listing ==
1. "Baby It's So Hard to Be Good" (Harlan Howard)
2. "It's Not Love (But It's Not Bad)" (Hank Cochran, Glenn Martin)
3. "Road Is Closed" (Cochran)
4. "Hillbilly Waltz" (G. Russell, Russ Russell)
5. "Bubbles in My Beer" (Tommy Duncan, Cindy Walker, Bob Wills)
6. "In This Corner" (Marty Robbins)
7. "Truck Driving Man" (Terry Fell)
8. "Big Blue Diamonds" (Earl "Kit" Carson)
9. "I've Got a New Heartache" (Ray Price, Wayne Walker)
10. "That Certain One" (Don Reid)
11. "I Don't Believe I'll Fall in Love Today" (Howard)
