= Crisp, Texas =

- Unincorporated community
- Location within Texas Crisp (the United States)
- Coordinates: 32°23′53″N 96°34′52″W
- Country: United States
- State: Texas
- County: Ellis
- Settled: 1892
- Elevation: 472 ft (144 m)
- Time zone: UTC-6 (CST)
- FIPS code: 48139
- GNIS feature ID: 1378180

Crisp is an unincorporated community in Ellis County, Texas, United States. It was the birthplace of country music star Ernest Tubb. It is located 21 miles (34 km) east of Waxahachie.

It was named for a Speaker of the U.S. House of Representatives, Charles F. Crisp. Crisp started to use the name when the post office opened in 1892; inhabitants had started living there a few years prior to that. The town reached its peak in population in the 1920s. It stayed that way until the 1960s, and then, the population plummeted to just under 100. The post office was discontinued in 1954.

A nearby brickyard produced for a time bricks stamped with the name of Crisp. As with those produced in the nearby towns of Ferris and Palmer, these bricks can still occasionally be found, especially in hands of brick collectors.
