= Say Something Nice to Sarah =

Studio album by Ernest Tubb
- Released: 1972
- Genre: Country, Honky tonk
- Label: Decca

Ernest Tubb chronology
One Sweet Hello (1971)	Say Something Nice to Sarah (1972)	Baby It's So Hard to Be Good (1972)

Say Something Nice to Sarah is an album by American country singer Ernest Tubb, released in 1972 (see 1972 in music).

Professional ratings
Review scores
Source	Rating
AllMusic	3/5 stars

== Track listing ==
1. "Honky Tonks and You" (Billy Hughes)
2. "It's Four in the Morning" (Jerry Chesnut)
3. "Ninety-Nine Years" (Glen Johnson)
4. "Heartaches by the Number" (Harlan Howard)
5. "I Care No More" (Jesse Ashlock)
6. "Pearlie Mai's Place" (Jim Anglin)
7. "Good Hearted Woman" (Waylon Jennings, Willie Nelson)
8. "Say Something Nice to Sarah" (John R. Cash, Winafred Rushing Kelley)
9. "I've Been Walkin'" (Gladys Flatt, E. Graves)
10. "Teach My Daddy How to Pray" (Jim Baker, Jim Owen)
11. "Look Twice Before You Go" (Jimmie Skinner)

== Personnel ==
- Ray Edenton - guitar
- Jack Mollette - guitar
- Joe Pruneda - bass
- Harold Bradley - bass guitar
- Billy Pfender - drums
- Leon Boulanger - fiddle
- Hargus "Pig" Robbins - piano
- Buddy Charleston - steel guitar
- Sonny Lomas - drums (track 11)

== Chart positions ==
Chart (1972)	Position
Billboard Country Albums	33
