= Let's Say Goodbye Like We Said Hello =

Box set by Ernest Tubb
- Released: 1991
- Recorded: March 1947 – October 1953
- Genres: Country, Honky tonk
- Label: Bear Family
- Producers: Paul Cohen, Dave Kapp; Richard Weize (reissue producer)

Ernest Tubb chronology
Let's Say Goodbye Like We Said Hello (1991)	Yellow Rose of Texas (1993)

Let's Say Goodbye Like We Said Hello is a compilation of Ernest Tubb recordings from 1947 to 1953, released in 1991. It is a 5-CD box set and contains 113 songs. The set includes extensive liner notes, session notes and photographs.

Among the songs are performances by Tubb with Red Foley, The Andrews Sisters, and Minnie Pearl.

== Reception ==
Professional ratings
Review scores
Source	Rating
Allmusic	4.5/5 stars

In his Allmusic review, Bruce Eder describes the album as "These 119 songs over five CDs represent Ernest Tubb at the very peak of his career musically and commercially, from 1947 until 1953. Disc One is filled with winners; Tubb's voice on these and the rest of the songs in this collection is at its richest and most expressive, not exactly soaring (it never did that) but never straining into the top of his range..."

== Track listing ==
Disc 1
1. You Hit The Nail Right On The Head
2. Two Wrongs Don't Make A Right
3. That Wild And Wicked Look In Your Eye
4. A Lonely Heart Knows
5. Don't Your Face Look Red
6. Answer To 'Rainbow At Midnight'
7. Watching My Past Go By
8. A Woman Has Wrecked Many A Good Man
9. Headin' Down The Wrong Highway
10. Let's Say Goodbye Like We Said Hello
11. Takin' It Easy Here
12. Seaman's Blues
13. How Can I Forget You
14. Yesterday's Winner Is A Loser Today
15. I'm With A Crowd But So Alone
16. Waiting For A Train
17. Forever Is Ending Today
18. Have You Ever Been Lonely
19. Till The End Of The World
20. Daddy, When Is Mommy Coming Home

Disc 2
1. Don't Rob Another Man's Castle
2. I'm Biting My Fingernails And Thinking Of You
3. My Filipino Rose
4. My Tennessee Baby
5. Slipping Around
6. Warm Red Wine
7. Driftwood On The River
8. Tennessee Border #2
9. Letters Have No Arms
10. I'll Take A Back Seat For You
11. Throw Your Love My Way
12. Don't Be Ashamed Of Your Age
13. Stand By Me
14. The Old Rugged Cross
15. What A Friend We Have In Jesus
16. The Wonderful City
17. When I Take My Vacation In Heaven
18. Farther Along
19. I Love You Because
20. Give Me A Little Old-Fashioned Love
21. Unfaithful One
22. Hillbilly Fever #2
23. Texas Vs. Kentucky

Disc 3
1. G-I-R-L Spells Trouble
2. You Don't Have To Be A Baby To Cry
3. Mother, The Queen Of My Heart
4. Goodnight Irene
5. (Remember Me) I'm The One Who Loves You
6. I Need Attention Bad
7. I'm Lonely And Blue
8. Why Did You Give Me Your Love?
9. I'm Free From The Chain Gang Now
10. Why Should I Be Lonely?
11. Hobo's Meditation
12. Good Morning Irene
13. The Lovebug Itch
14. Don't Stay Too Long
15. I'm Steppin' Out Of The Picture
16. May The Good Lord Bless And Keep You
17. When It's Prayer Meetin' Time In The Hollow
18. A Drunkard's Child
19. Any Old Time
20. If You Want Some Lovin'
21. So Long (It's Been Good To Know Yuh)
22. The Chicken Song

Disc 4
1. The Strange Little Girl
2. Kentucky Waltz
3. Hey La La
4. Rose Of The Mountains
5. Precious Little Baby
6. I'm With A Crowd But So Alone
7. So Many Times
8. My Mother Must Have Been A Girl Like You
9. Somebody's Stolen My Honey
10. A Heartsick Soldier On A Heartbreak Ridge
11. I'm In Love With Molly
12. Too Old To Cut The Mustard
13. Missing In Action
14. I Will Miss You When You Go
15. Fortunes In Memories
16. Dear Judge
17. Don't Brush Them On Me
18. I Love Everything You Do
19. Somebody Loves You
20. Don't Trifle On Your Sweetheart
21. Hank, It Will Never Be The Same Without You
22. Beyond The Sunset
23. When Jimmie Rodgers Said Good-Bye
24. Jimmie Rodgers' Last Thoughts
25. My Wasted Past
26. Counterfeit Kisses

Disc 5
1. The Honeymoon Is Over
2. No Help Wanted #2
3. You're A Real Good Friend
4. A Dear John Letter
5. Double Datin'
6. It's The Mileage That's Slowin' Us Down
7. Divorce Granted
8. Honky-Tonk Heart
9. I'm Not Looking For An Angel
10. I Met A Friend
11. When Jesus Calls
12. Too Old To Tango
13. Dr. Ketchum
14. Love Lifted Me
15. White Christmas
16. Blue Christmas
17. Christmas Island
18. C-H-R-I-S-T-M-A-S
19. We Need God For Christmas
20. Merry Christmas, You All!
21. Blue Snowflakes
22. I'm Trimming My Christmas Tree With Teardrops

== Personnel ==
- Ernest Tubb – vocals, guitar
- Red Foley – vocals
- Minnie Pearl – vocals
- LaVerne Andrews – vocals
- Maxene Andrews – vocals
- Patty Andrews – vocals
- Jerry Byrd – steel guitar
- Jack Drake – bass
- Owen Bradley – piano, organ
- Farris Coursey – drums
- Buddy Harman – drums
- Dickie Harris – steel guitar
- Don Helms – steel guitar
- Billy Robinson – steel guitar
- Bill Drake – guitar
- Billy Byrd – guitar
- Hank Garland – guitar
- Walter Garland – guitar
- Grady Martin – guitar
- Jack Shook – guitar
- Jimmie Short – guitar
- Leon Short – guitar
- Johnny "Tub" Johnson – guitar
- Hal Smith – fiddle
- Thomas Lee Jackson Jr. – fiddle
- Mack Mcgarr – mandolin
- Alcyone Beasley – choir, chorus
- Dottie Dillard – choir, chorus
- Evelyn Wilson – choir, chorus
- Anita Kerr Singers – choir, chorus
- The Sunshine Trio – choir, chorus

Production notes:

- Paul Cohen – producer
- Dave Kapp – producer
- Richard Weize – reissue producer
- Rebecca Everett – mastering
- R.A. Andreas – photography, illustrations
- Robert K. Oermann – photography, illustrations
- Don Roy – photography, illustrations
- Ekkehard Schumann – photography, illustrations
- Jerry Strobel – photography, illustrations
- Elaine Tubb – vocals, photography, illustrations
- Ronnie Pugh – liner notes, discography
