= That's All She Wrote (Jerry Fuller song) =

Country Song by Jerry Fuller

Single by Ray Price

from the album Rainbows and Tears
- B-side: "I Don't Feel Nothing"
- Released: 1976
- Genre: Country
- Length: 3:09
- Label: ABC Dot
- Songwriter: Jerry Fuller
- Producer: Jim Foglesong

"That's All She Wrote" is a country song written by Jerry Fuller. It was recorded in 1964 by Ernest Tubb on his album Thanks a Lot. In 1976 it was a No.34 single for Ray Price. The song has been covered by various other artists including Johnny Mathis on Feelings (1975), and by T. G. Sheppard in 1978.
