= Country Hit Time =

Studio album by Ernest Tubb
- Released: September 1968
- Recorded: February–April 1968
- Studios: Bradley's Barn, Mount Juliet, Tennessee
- Genres: Country, Honky tonk
- Label: Decca
- Producer: Owen Bradley

Ernest Tubb chronology
Ernest Tubb Sings Hank Williams (1968)	Country Hit Time (1968)	Let's Turn Back the Years (1969)

Professional ratings
Review scores
Source	Rating
AllMusic	2/5 stars

Country Hit Time is an album by American country singer Ernest Tubb, released in 1968 (see 1968 in music).

== Track listing ==
1. "Dime at a Time" (Jerry Chesnut, Dottie Bruce)
2. "If My Heart Had Windows" (Dallas Frazier)
3. "Bottle Let Me Down" (Merle Haggard)
4. "Life Turned Her That Way" (Harlan Howard)
5. "Crying Time" (Buck Owens)
6. "That's the Chance I'll Have to Take" (Waylon Jennings)
7. "Don't Squeeze My Sharmon" (Carl Belew, Van Givens)
8. "Sing Me Back Home" (Haggard)
9. "Destination Atlanta GA" (Bill Hayes, Bill Howard)
10. "Image of Me" (Wayne Kemp)
11. "She Went a Little Bit Farther" (Merle Travis, Mack Vickery)

== Personnel ==
- Ernest Tubb – vocals, guitar
- Cal Smith – guitar
- Steve Chapman – guitar
- Buddy Charleton – pedal steel guitar
- Buck Evans – bass
- Jack Drake – bass
- Billy Pfender – drums
- Bob Wilson – piano
- Jerry Smith – piano
