= All She Wrote =

All She Wrote may refer to:

- "All She Wrote" (Ross Copperman song), 2007
- "All She Wrote" (FireHouse song), 1991
- "All She Wrote" (Six60 song), 2021
- Alternative title of the Chaka Demus & Pliers album Tease Me, 1993

== See also ==
- That's All She Wrote (disambiguation)
