= The Family Bible =

Studio album by Ernest Tubb
- Released: June 1963
- Recorded: January–March 1962
- Studio: Columbia (Nashville, Tennessee)
- Genre: Country, honky tonk, gospel
- Label: Decca
- Producer: Owen Bradley

Ernest Tubb chronology
Just Call Me Lonesome (1963)	The Family Bible (1963)	Thanks a Lot (1964)

The Family Bible is a gospel album by American country singer Ernest Tubb, released in 1963 (see 1963 in music).

== Track listing ==
1. "I Saw the Light" (Hank Williams)
2. "Great Speckled Bird" (Roy Carter, Guy Smith)
3. "Precious Memories" (J. B. F. Wright)
4. "When It's Prayer Meeting Time in the Hollow" (Al Rice, Fleming Allan)
5. "Family Bible" (Willie Nelson)
6. "He'll Understand and Say Well Done" (Jesse R. Baxter, Lucie E. Campbell, Roger Wilson)
7. "Wings of a Dove" (Bob Ferguson)
8. "Follow Me" (Sandra Adlon, Virginia Balmer, Leon Rhodes)
9. "What a Friend We Have in Jesus" (Joseph M. Scriven, Charles Converse, Sid Feller)
10. "Lonesome Valley" (A. P. Carter)
11. "Stand By Me" (Charles A. Tindley)
12. "If We Never Meet Again" (Albert E. Brumley)

== Personnel ==
- Ernest Tubb – vocals, guitar
- Cal Smith – guitar
- Leon Rhodes – guitar
- Grady Martin – guitar
- Buddy Charleton – pedal steel guitar
- Jack Drake – bass
- Jack Greene – drums
- Hargus "Pig" Robbins – piano
- Floyd Cramer – piano
- The Jordanaires – vocals
