= Mr. and Mrs. Used to Be =

Single by Loretta Lynn and Ernest Tubb

from the album Mr. & Mrs. Used to Be
- B-side: "Love Was Right Here All the Time"
- Released: July 1964
- Recorded: March 10, 1964
- Studio: Columbia, Nashville, Tennessee
- Genre: Country
- Label: Decca
- Songwriter(s): Billy Joe Deaton
- Producer(s): Owen Bradley

Loretta Lynn and Ernest Tubb singles chronology
"Mr. and Mrs. Used to Be" (1964)	"Our Hearts Are Holding Hands" (1965)

"Mr. and Mrs. Used to Be" is a song written by Billy Joe Deaton that was originally performed by American country music artists Loretta Lynn and Ernest Tubb. It was released as a single in July 1964 via Decca Records.

== Background and reception ==
"Mr. and Mrs. Used to Be" was recorded at the Columbia Recording Studios in Nashville, Tennessee on March 10, 1964. The session was produced by the studio's co-founder, renowned country music producer Owen Bradley. Three additional tracks were recorded during this session.

"Mr. and Mrs. Used to Be" reached number eleven on the Billboard Hot Country Singles survey in 1964. It was included on their studio album, Mr. & Mrs. Used to Be (1965).

== Charts ==
=== Weekly charts ===
Chart (1964)	Peak position
US Hot Country Singles (Billboard)	11

== Cover Versions ==
- 1988 - Leon Redbone recorded the song as a duet with Lori Lynn Smith for his album No Regrets.
