= Thanks a Lot (Ernest Tubb song) =

Single by Ernest Tubb

from the album Thanks a Lot
- B-side: "The Way You're Living"
- Released: 1963
- Genre: Country
- Length: 2:30
- Label: Decca
- Songwriters: Eddie Miller, Don Sessions

"Thanks a Lot" is a country music song written by Eddie Miller and Don Sessions and popularized by singer Ernest Tubb. It was released in 1963 on the Decca label (catalog no. 31526) with "The Way You're Living" as the "B" side. It was Tubb's biggest hit of the 1960s, and his last song to break the top 10. It peaked in September 1963 at No. 3 on the Billboard country and western best seller chart and remained on the chart for 23 weeks. At the end of the year, it was ranked No. 49 on the Billboard Top Country Singles of 1963. To avoid diluting his hit, Tubb did not release a subsequent single for seven months after its release. The following year, Tubb included the song as the title track on his 1964 album Thanks a Lot.

The song's lyrics tell of a man with a broken heart after he lost his honey's love. She told their friends she's not sorry for what she did and that he deserved what he got. Now all he's got is a broken heart. He has cried a lot and tells her, "Thanks, thanks a lot."

Loretta Lynn later performed a duet of the song with Tubb on the 1979 tribute album "The Legend and the Legacy". After a 1981 concert by Tubb, Frederick Burger wrote in the Chicago Tribune that "the crowd stood and cheered" as he opened the show with "Thanks a Lot", "one of the tearjerking love songs that has kept him before the public all these years."

The song has also appeared on multiple compilation albums, including "Ernest Tubb's Greatest Hits" (1968), "The Ernest Tubb Collection" (1989), "The Very Best of Ernest Tubb" (1998), and "The Definitive Collection" (2006).
