= By Request (Ernest Tubb album) =

Studio album by Ernest Tubb
- Released: April 1966
- Recorded: April–December 1965
- Studio: RCA Studio B (Nashville, Tennessee)
- Genre: Country, Honky tonk
- Label: Decca
- Producer: Owen Bradley

Ernest Tubb chronology
Stand by Me (1966)	By Request (1966)	Country Hits Old and New (1966)

Professional ratings
Review scores
Source	Rating
AllMusic	4.5/5 stars

By Request is an album by American country singer Ernest Tubb, released in 1966 (see 1966 in music).

== Track listing ==
1. "I'll Be There (If You Ever Want Me)" (Ray Price, Rusty Gabbard)
2. "With Tears in My Eyes" (Paul Howard)
3. "Release Me" (Eddie Miller, W. S. Stevenson)
4. "Last Goodbye" (Ernest Tubb, Sammy Farsmark)
5. "Forgive Me" (Wiley Walker, Gene Sullivan)
6. "Mom and Dad's Waltz" (Lefty Frizzell)
7. "Too Many Rivers" (Harlan Howard)
8. "My Shoes Keep Walking Back to You" (Bob Wills, Lee Ross)
9. "Lost Highway" (Leon Payne)
10. "You'll Still Be in My Heart" (Buddy Starcher, Ted West)
11. "Born to Lose" (Frankie Brown)
12. "Hello Trouble (Come on In)" (Orville Couch, Eddie McDuff)

== Personnel ==
- Ernest Tubb – vocals, guitar
- Leon Rhodes – guitar
- Jerry Shook – guitar, bass
- Cal Smith – guitar
- Buddy Charleton – pedal steel guitar
- Jack Drake – bass
- Jack Greene – drums
- Jerry Smith – piano

== Chart positions ==
Chart (1966)	Position
Billboard Country Albums	28
