= Locust Grove, Shenandoah County, Virginia =

Locust Grove, Virginia
- CDP
- Interactive map of Locust Grove, Virginia
- Coordinates: 38°42′32″N 78°38′52″W
- Country: United States
- State: Virginia
- County: Shenandoah
- Time zone: UTC−5 (Eastern (EST))
  - Summer (DST): UTC−4 (EDT)
- FIPS code: 51-04928

Locust Grove is a census-designated place in Shenandoah County, in the U.S. state of Virginia.
