= Leon Rhodes =

American country music guitarist (1932–2017)

- Born: March 10, 1932; Dallas, Texas, U.S.
- Died: December 9, 2017 (aged 85) Nashville, Tennessee, U.S.
- Genres: Country
- Occupation: Musician
- Instrument: Guitar
- Years active: 1948–2014
- Formerly of: The Texas Troubadours; The Opry Band; Hee Haw band

Leon Rhodes (March 10, 1932 – December 9, 2017) was an American country music guitarist. He primarily played behind Ernest Tubb as part of the Texas Troubadours and later was a house band member for the television programs Grand Ole Opry and Hee Haw. Rhodes also played as a session musician for various country singers such as Willie Nelson, Waylon Jennings, Loretta Lynn, George Strait, and John Denver, among others.

Rhodes was regarded as one of the foremost country guitarists of his era for his quickness and accuracy. During his time with the Troubadours, Rhodes developed recognition as Tubb would often introduce him by name prior to his guitar solos.

== Life and career ==
=== 1932–1959: Early life and beginnings ===
Leon Rhodes was born on March 10, 1932, in Dallas, Texas. He was born into a musically inclined family as his father, James Edward Rhodes, played the guitar and harmonica while his mother, May Rhodes (née Meharg), was a pianist. Rhodes began to teach himself to play guitar at the age of ten. Rhodes and his family were Pentecostals, and he played at dances for his church.

When Rhodes was 16 years old, he was hired for his first job in the music industry as a member of "The Big D Jamboree" radio program on Dallas station KRLD. He received his first recording opportunities in the 1950s, when he worked as a session musician for fellow Texans Lefty Frizzell and Ray Price. Rhodes also played at the Silver Spur Club and the Longhorn Ballroom for owner Jack Ruby, the man later known for killing Lee Harvey Oswald in the wake of the assassination of John F. Kennedy.

=== 1959–1967: Ernest Tubb and the Texas Troubadours ===
In 1959, Rhodes played a set at the Longhorn Ballroom prior to an evening performance at the venue by Ernest Tubb and the Texas Troubadours. One of the Troubadours, steel guitarist Buddy Emmons, asked Rhodes to play in Tubb's style and invited him to work with the band in Nashville. Rhodes initially turned down the offer but eventually agreed to partake in a two-week tour with the band. By 1960, he was hired as the lead guitarist for the group. He toured with the Troubadours for 200 to 300 days a year and recorded with them. Rhodes was credited on 12 Tubb albums, including Thanks a Lot (1964) and My Pick of the Hits (1965). Rhodes also backed Tubb on Mr. and Mrs. Used to Be, a 1965 collaborative album with Loretta Lynn. In 1966, Rhodes and several of his Troubadour bandmates worked with Willie Nelson on his album Country Favorites – Willie Nelson Style. Another Story, the final Troubadours project involving Rhodes, was released in 1967 and was the band's most successful studio album as it peaked at sixth on Billboard magazine's Top Country Albums chart. Rhodes left the Troubadours in December 1966.

=== 1967–2014: Sideman career and session work ===
A week after departing the Texas Troubadours, Rhodes joined the house band for the Nashville-based television program Grand Ole Opry in 1967. At the time, Jimmy "Spider" Wilson was the only other guitarist on the staff, and other contemporaries during his arrival included pianist Jerry Whitehurst, bassist Roy Huskey, and fiddler Ed Hyde. Rhodes was already familiar with most of the artists on the show from his time touring with Tubb.

In 1971, Rhodes joined the house band for the Nashville-based television show Hee Haw, working concurrently with his Opry stint. On March 16, 1974, during the opening of the new Grand Ole Opry House, Rhodes played for a crowd that included U.S. president Richard Nixon and First Lady Pat Nixon. The same year, he played bass guitar for Waylon Jennings on The Ramblin' Man, which peaked at third on the country charts. Between 1975 and 1976, Rhodes appeared on two albums for Buddy Emmons, his original Troubadours scout.

In 1981, Rhodes played bass for John Denver's album Some Days Are Diamonds, B. J. Thomas's Some Love Songs Never Die, and Don McLean's Believers. In 1983, Rhodes worked with George Strait on Right or Wrong, a country chart-topper that received a platinum certification from the Recording Industry Association of America.

In 1991, Rhodes departed from the Hee Haw staff after spending two decades on the show. In 2003, Rhodes and several other longtime staff members were fired by Opry manager Pete Fisher in an attempt to reinvigorate the show's popularity with an appeal to younger audiences. In 2014, Rhodes retired from his music career and was subsequently honored by the Country Music Hall of Fame and Museum in its "Nashville Cats" series.

== Personal life ==
Rhodes met his wife, Judith Arndt Rhodes, while touring with the Troubadours – the two were married in January 1965. Rhodes had eight children. At the time of his death, he had 25 grandchildren and 17 great-grandchildren. Rhodes was raised in a Pentecostal family and remained a Christian throughout his life.

Rhodes died on the morning of December 9, 2017, at his home in the Nashville neighborhood of Donelson. His death was mourned online by country musicians Charlie Daniels and Elizabeth Cook, among others.

== Legacy ==
Rhodes has been considered one of the greatest country music guitarists of all time due to his stint backing Ernest Tubb with the Texas Troubadours and his decades-long career as a sideman and session musician in Nashville. Vince Gill said that "Leon Rhodes can play circles around most guitar players." Eddie Stubbs said of Rhodes and the Troubadours that "they were what every hillbilly band at the time wanted to be, but wasn't."

Rhodes was given the Super Picker Award by The Recording Academy in 1976 and was honored in a joint resolution in the Tennessee General Assembly authored by state representative Ben West Jr. in 2010.

== Discography ==
=== Ernest Tubb and the Texas Troubadours ===
- All Time Hits (1960)
- On Tour (1962)
- Ernest Tubb's Fabulous Texas Troubadours (1963)
- Just Call Me Lonesome (1963)
- The Family Bible (1963)
- Thanks a Lot (1964)
- Blue Christmas (1964)
- My Pick of the Hits (1965)
- Hittin' the Road (1965)
- By Request (1966)
- Country Hits Old and New (1966)
- Another Story (1967)
