= Try Me One More Time (song) =

Single by Ernest Tubb
- Released: 1946
- Genre: Country
- Label: Decca
- Songwriter: Ernest Tubb

"Try Me One More Time" is a country music song written and performed by Ernest Tubb. It was released in 1946 on the Decca label (catalog no. 46047) with "Soldier's Last Letter" as the flip-side. It peaked at No. 2 on the Billboard country and western chart and remained on the chart for 17 weeks.

The lyrics are a plea to a lover to give him another chance. He admits he has been untrue, and he knows she is now with another. He promises he will make it up to her somehow and promises never again to be unkind.

The song was also covered by multiple artists, including Arlo Guthrie, Willie Nix, Wesley Tuttle, and Justin Tubb.

The song also appeared on a number of compilation albums, includuing "Ernest Tubb Favorites" (1956), "The Complete Live 1965 Show" (1998), "The Texas Troubadour" (2003), "The Definitive Collection" (2006), and "The Complete Hits, 1941-1962" (2016).
