= Feelings (Johnny Mathis album) =

Studio album by Johnny Mathis
- Released: October 20, 1975
- Recorded: March 25, 1975; June 16, 1975; August 2, 1975; August 9, 1975; August 29, 1975
- Studio: A&M (Hollywood); Sound Labs (Los Angeles)
- Genre: Traditional pop; vocal pop
- Length: 35:26
- Label: Columbia
- Producer: Jack Gold

Johnny Mathis chronology
When Will I See You Again (1975)	Feelings (1975)	I Only Have Eyes for You (1976)

Professional ratings
Review scores
Source	Rating
Allmusic	3/5 stars
Billboard	positive
The Encyclopedia of Popular Music	3/5 stars

Feelings is an album by American pop singer Johnny Mathis that was released on October 20, 1975, by Columbia Records and strayed slightly from the singer's usual practice of covering hits by other artists by including two new songs, both written by Jerry Fuller: "Hurry Mother Nature" and "That's All She Wrote", which Ray Price took to number 34 on the Country chart the following spring.

The album made its first appearance on Billboard magazine's Top LP's & Tapes chart in the issue dated November 8, 1975, and remained there for 21 weeks, peaking at number 97. On February 1, 1976, the British Phonographic Industry awarded the album with Silver certification for sales of 60,000 units. It received Gold certification from the Recording Industry Association of America on December 30, 1980.

The first single from the album, "Stardust", entered Billboard's list of the 50 most popular Easy Listening songs in the US in the issue of the magazine dated November 29, 1975, and peaked at number four over the course of 12 weeks. "One Day in Your Life" was released as the follow-up and entered that same chart in the March 13, 1976, issue, eventually getting as high as number 36 during its five weeks there.

== Reception ==
Billboard liked what they heard. "Covering other people's hits can be dangerous, but not for Mathis, who is in the right mood, tempo and vocal range this time around."

AllMusic's Ed Hogan wrote a brief but positive retrospective review. "Produced by Jack Gold with great arrangements by Gene Page, Feelings is one of Johnny Mathis's best '70s era albums."

== Track listing ==
=== Side one ===
1. "One Day in Your Life" (Renée Armand, Samuel F. Brown III) – 4:14
2. "Stardust" (Hoagy Carmichael, Mitchell Parish) – 3:27
3. "What I Did for Love" from A Chorus Line (Marvin Hamlisch, Edward Kleban) – 2:44
4. "Midnight Blue" (Melissa Manchester, Carole Bayer Sager) – 3:34
5. "The Greatest Gift" from The Return of the Pink Panther (Hal David, Henry Mancini) – 2:49

=== Side two ===
1. "99 Miles from L.A." (Hal David, Albert Hammond) – 3:35
2. "Hurry Mother Nature" (Jerry Fuller) – 3:24
3. "Feelings" (Morris Albert, Loulou Gasté) – 3:28
4. "That's All She Wrote" (Jerry Fuller) – 3:38
5. "Solitaire" (Neil Sedaka, Phil Cody) – 4:33

=== 2017 CD bonus tracks ===
This album's CD release as part of the 2017 box set The Voice of Romance: The Columbia Original Album Collection included two bonus tracks that were previously unavailable:

- "Crazy Little Love Makin' Ways" (Rose McCoy, Robert Mersey) – 2:56
- "Let's Go On from Here" (Kenneth Crouch) – 2:54

== Recording dates ==
From the liner notes for The Voice of Romance: The Columbia Original Album Collection:

- March 25, 1975 – "Crazy Little Love Makin' Ways", "The Greatest Gift", "Let's Go On from Here"
- June 16, 1975 – "99 Miles from L.A.", "One Day in Your Life", "What I Did for Love"
- August 2, 1975 – "Midnight Blue", "That's All She Wrote"
- August 9, 1975 – "Hurry Mother Nature"
- August 29, 1975 – "Feelings", "Solitaire", "Stardust"

== Song information ==
The histories of some of the selections that Mathis made for this album are quite varied. Michael Jackson recorded "One Day in Your Life" before this album was released in 1975, but his recording was not available as a single until 1981. "Stardust" reached the charts 15 times through various recordings between 1930 and 1943. Jack Jones had a number 25 Easy Listening hit with "What I Did for Love", which originated in the 1975 Broadway musical A Chorus Line. Melissa Manchester's "Midnight Blue" spent two weeks at number one on the Easy Listening chart in addition to reaching number six on the Billboard Hot 100. And "The Greatest Gift" was performed by an unnamed chorus for the soundtrack of the 1975 film The Return of the Pink Panther.

Albert Hammond's "99 Miles From L.A." is another number one Easy Listening hit that Mathis covers here, although the song only managed a number 91 showing on the pop chart. "Feelings" by Morris Albert fared much better on the Hot 100, making it to number six, in addition to peaking at number two Easy Listening and number four UK and receiving Gold certification from the Recording Industry Association of America. And "Solitaire" had its best chart performance in the US as a number one Easy Listening hit for The Carpenters that also got as high as number 17 pop, but their number 32 performance with the song on the UK singles chart in 1975 fell far short of the number four position that Andy Williams attained with his version on that same chart two years earlier.

== Personnel ==
From the liner notes of the original album:

- Johnny Mathis – vocals
- Jack Gold – producer
- Gene Page – arranger, conductor
- Dick Bogert – engineer ("Hurry Mother Nature", "Midnight Blue", "That's All She Wrote")
- Mickey Crofford – engineer ("The Greatest Gift")
- Ray Gerhardt – engineer ("99 Miles from L.A.", "One Day in Your Life", "What I Did for Love")
- Armin Steiner – engineer ("Feelings", "Solitaire", "Stardust")
- Richard Noble – photography
- Anne Garner – design

== Bibliography ==
- Whitburn, Joel (1986), Joel Whitburn's Pop Memories, 1890-1954, Record Research Inc., ISBN 0898200830
- Whitburn, Joel (2002), Joel Whitburn's Top Country Singles, 1944-2001, Record Research Inc., ISBN 0898201519
- Whitburn, Joel (2004), Joel Whitburn Presents Top R&B/Hip-Hop Singles, 1942-2004, Record Research Inc., ISBN 0-89820-160-8
- Whitburn, Joel (2007), Joel Whitburn Presents Billboard Top Adult Songs, 1961-2006, Record Research Inc., ISBN 978-0898201697
- Whitburn, Joel (2009), Joel Whitburn's Top Pop Singles, 1955-2008, Record Research Inc., ISBN 978-0-89820-180-2
- Whitburn, Joel (2010), Joel Whitburn Presents Top Pop Albums, Seventh Edition, Record Research Inc., ISBN 978-0-89820-183-3
