= Someday You'll Call My Name =

Single by Hank Williams
- A-side: "At the First Fall of Snow"
- B-side: "Someday You'll Call My Name"
- Released: 1955
- Recorded: August 1948–May 1949, Shreveport
- Genre: Country, gospel
- Length: 2:12
- Label: MGM
- Songwriters: Jean Branch, Eddie Hill

"Someday You'll Call My Name" is a song composed written by Jean Branch and Eddie Hill. It was a hit for country singer Jimmy Wakely but is mostly associated with Hank Williams, who performed it on KWKH in Shreveport, Louisiana as part of the Johnny Fair Syrup radio show along with Wakely's other hit, "I Wish I Had a Nickel." MGM obtained the right to these recordings and released "Someday You'll Call My Name" as the B-side to "At the First Fall of Snow" in 1955 as a posthumous single. Country music historian Colin Escott states that the Johnny Fair transcriptions "rank alongside Hank's most affecting work" and singles out the Wakely covers for particular praise: "The songs were trite and affectless in Wakely's hands, but Hank filled them with vengeance and unrequited longing."
