= Thanks a Lot (album) =

Studio album by Ernest Tubb
- Released: June 1964
- Recorded: July 1963–January 1964
- Studio: Columbia (Nashville, Tennessee)
- Genre: Country, honky tonk
- Label: Decca
- Producer: Owen Bradley

Ernest Tubb chronology
The Family Bible (1963)	Thanks a Lot (1964)	Blue Christmas (1964)

Thanks a Lot is an album by American country singer Ernest Tubb, released in 1964 (see 1964 in music).

Professional ratings
Review scores
Source	Rating
AllMusic	3/5 stars

== Track listing ==
1. "Thanks a Lot" (Eddie Miller, Don Sessions)
2. "Way That You're Living" (Jimmy Swan)
3. "Green Light" (Hank Thompson)
4. "Your Side of the Story" (Justin Tubb)
5. "There She Goes" (Eddie Miller, W. S. Stevenson, Durwood Haddock)
6. "That's All She Wrote" (Jerry Fuller)
7. "Steppin' Out" (Billy Starr)
8. "Stop Me If You've Heard This One Before" (J. Tubb)
9. "I Almost Lost My Mind" (Ivory Joe Hunter)
10. "Big Fool of the Year" (J. Tubb)
11. "Take a Letter Miss Gray" (J. Tubb)
12. "Lonesome 7-7203" (J. Tubb)

== Personnel ==
- Ernest Tubb – vocals, guitar
- Cal Smith – guitar
- Leon Rhodes – guitar
- Grady Martin – guitar
- Buddy Charleton – pedal steel guitar
- Harold Bradley – bass
- Jack Drake – bass
- Jack Greene – drums
- Harold Weakley – drums
- Hargus "Pig" Robbins – piano
- Floyd Cramer – piano
- The Jordanaires – vocals

== Chart positions ==
Chart (1964)	Position
Billboard Country Albums	7
