= Buddy Charleton =

American pedal steel guitarist

- Buddy Charleton performing Cool it on The Ernest Tubb Show.

Background information
- Born: Elmer Lee Charleton, Jr; March 6, 1938; New Market, Virginia, United States
- Died: January 25, 2011 (aged 72) Locust Grove, Virginia, United States
- Genres: country, country jazz
- Occupations: musician, music teacher
- Instrument: pedal steel guitar
- Years active: 1962–1973
- Labels: Decca, Bear Family Records

Elmer Lee "Buddy" Charleton (March 6, 1938 – January 25, 2011), was an American country musician and teacher. Known primarily for his work as a pedal steel guitarist in Ernest Tubb's Texas Troubadours band, Charleton played on numerous songs such as Waltz across Texas and instrumentals Cool it, Honey Fingers, Almost to Tulsa and Rhodes-Bud Boogie. When Buddy's touring career came to a close, he became involved with Billy Cooper's Music in Orange, VA working as a pedal steel instructor for many years. Buddy's teaching work greatly influenced the next generation of pedal steel guitarists.
