= The Legend and the Legacy =

Compilation album by Ernest Tubb
- Released: 1979
- Recorded: 1977–1978
- Studio: Pete's Place, Nashville, Tennessee
- Genre: Country, honky tonk
- Length: 30:52 (original)
- Label: Cachet Records
- Producer: Pete Drake

The Legend and the Legacy is a compilation album by American country singer Ernest Tubb, released in 1979. The initial release was issued on LP as The Legend and the Legacy Volume 1. It was released on First Generation Records, but due to legal issues, was withdrawn and released on Cachet Records.

== History ==
Producer and pedal steel guitar artist Pete Drake brought Tubb and his current line-up of the Texas Troubadours into the recording studio to record basic tracks in 1977. Unknown to Tubb, Drake later secretly brought in other famous country music singers and musicians to overdub vocals and instruments to the already recorded tracks. Special guests included such artists as Chet Atkins, Johnny Cash, Merle Haggard, Loretta Lynn, Willie Nelson, Johnny Paycheck, Ferlin Husky, Waylon Jennings, George Jones, Marty Robbins, Conway Twitty, Charlie Rich and many others.

Drake intended two issues of the material recorded—hence the Volume 1—but due to poor distribution and sales, the album quickly went out of print. Subsequent reissues on CD included additional tracks.

It was reissued again on the 20th anniversary of its release in 1999 by First Generation Records in a limited run. The Pete Drake Music Group recently made the project available as a download or physical CD via Drake's First Generation Records online store at Bandcamp.

== Reception ==
Professional ratings
Review scores
Source	Rating
Allmusic	5/5 stars

In his Allmusic review, Eugene Chadbourne said, "The highest possible rating for this project reflects its brilliance as a grand statement about country & western music, especially the incredible loyalty its artists have toward historic figures in the genre."

== Track listing ==
=== Side one ===
1. "Waltz Across Texas" with Willie Nelson (Talmadge Tubb) – 2:36
2. "Half a Mind" with George Jones (Roger Miller) – 2:35
3. "Thanks a Lot" with Loretta Lynn (Eddie Miller, Don Sessions) – 2:35
4. "Jealous Loving Heart" with Johnny Cash (Talmadge Tubb, Ernest Tubb) – 1:58
5. "Journey's End" with Marty Robbins and the Wilburn Bros. (Ernest Tubb, Pappy Stewart) – 2:41
6. "Set up Two Glasses, Joe" with Ferlin Husky and Simon Crum (Cindy Walker) – 2:12

=== Side two ===
1. "Walking the Floor Over You" with Merle Haggard and Charlie Daniels (Ernest Tubb) – 2:02
2. "You're the Only Good Thing (That's Happened to Me)" with Charlie Rich (Jack Toombs) – 2:32
3. "The Women Make a Fool Out of Me" with Conway Twitty (Jimmie Rodgers) – 2:42
4. "Let's Say Goodbye Like We Said Hello" with Johnny Paycheck (Ernest Tubb, Jimmie Skinner) – 3:06
5. "Blue Eyed Elaine" with Justin Tubb (Ernest Tubb) – 2:54
6. "Our Baby's Book" with Cal Smith (Ernest Tubb) – 3:00

== 1999 Reissue track listing ==
1. "Waltz Across Texas" (T. Tubb, E. Tubb) – 2:38
2. "When the World Has Turned You Down" (E. Tubb) – 3:12
3. "Let's Say Goodbye Like We Said Hello" (E. Tubb, Jimmie Skinner) – 3:09
4. "Answer the Phone" (Cindy Walker) – 2:31
5. "Journey's End" (Tubb, Pappy Stewart) – 2:45
6. "Walking the Floor Over You" (E. Tubb) – 2:05
7. "Half a Mind" (Roger Miller) – 2:39
8. "Jealous Loving Heart" (T. Tubb, E. Tubb) – 2:03
9. "Rainbow at Midnight" (Lost John Miller) – 3:17
10. "Set up Two Glasses, Joe" (Walker) – 2:17
11. "You Nearly Lose Your Mind" (E. Tubb) – 2:47
12. "You're the Only Good Thing (That's Happened to Me)" (Jack Toombs, Chuck Gregory) – 2:39
13. "Filipino Baby" (Billy Cox, Clarke Van Ness) – 3:10
14. "The Women Make a Fool Out of Me" (Rodgers) – 2:45
15. "Seaman's Blues" (T. Tubb, E. Tubb) – 3:05
16. "Thanks a Lot" (Eddie Miller, Don Sessions) – 2:42
17. "It's Been So Long, Darling" (E. Tubb) – 3:12
18. "Blue Eyed Elaine" (E. Tubb) – 2:58
19. "Our Baby's Book" (E. Tubb) – 3:06
20. "Soldier's Last Letter" (Redd Stewart, E. Tubb) – 3:28

== Chart positions ==
Year	Chart	Position
1979	Billboard Country Albums	10

== Personnel ==
- Ernest Tubb – vocals, guitar
- Johnny Cash – vocals ("Jealous Loving Heart")
- Merle Haggard – vocals, guitar ("Walking the Floor Over You")
- Loretta Lynn – vocals ("Thanks a Lot", "Answer the Phone")
- Willie Nelson – vocals ("Waltz Across Texas", "You Nearly Lose Your Mind")
- Gary Paxton – vocals
- Johnny Paycheck – vocals ("Let's Say Goodbye Like We Said Hello")
- Ferlin Husky – vocals ("Set up Two Glasses, Joe")
- Waylon Jennings – vocals ("You Nearly Lose Your Mind")
- George Jones – vocals ("Half a Mind")
- Mary Ann Kennedy – vocals
- Simon Crum – vocals ("Set up Two Glasses, Joe")
- Linda Hargrove – vocals
- Tim Boone – vocals
- Marty Robbins – vocals ("Journey's End")
- Pamela Rose – vocals
- Cal Smith – vocals ("Our Baby's Book")
- Carmol Taylor – vocals
- Justin Tubb – vocals ("Blue Eyed Elaine")
- Conway Twitty – vocals ("The Women Make a Fool Out of Me")
- The Wilburn Brothers – vocals ("Journey's End")
- Norro Wilson – vocals
- Charlie Rich – vocals ("You're the Only Good Thing")
- Charlie Daniels – vocals, guitar
- Johnny Cox – pedal steel guitar
- Jimmy Crawford – pedal steel guitar
- Pete Drake – pedal steel guitar
- Buddy Emmons – pedal steel guitar
- Speedy West – pedal steel guitar
- Lynn Owsley – pedal steel guitar
- Chet Atkins – guitar
- Phil Baugh – guitar
- Ronald Blackwell – guitar
- Harold Bradley – guitar
- Billy Byrd – guitar
- Jimmy Capps – guitar
- Ray Edenton – guitar
- Wayne Hammond – guitar
- Tommy Hill – guitar
- Jerry Kennedy – guitar
- Grady Martin – guitar
- Rusty Adams – guitar
- Tommy Allsup – guitar
- Pete Mitchell – guitar
- Robert Rector – guitar
- Billy Sanford – guitar
- Dale Sellers – guitar
- Jerry Shook – guitar
- Jack Solomon – guitar
- Reggie Young – guitar
- Pete Wade – guitar
- Billy Grammer – guitar
- Shorty Lavender – fiddle
- Owen Bradley – piano
- David Briggs – piano
- Jerry Carrigan – drums
- Hayword Bishop – drums
- Charlie McCoy – harmonica
- Bob Moore – bass
- Joe Pruneda Jr. – bass
- Billy Linneman – bass
- Larry Emmons – bass
- Henry Strzelecki – bass
- George Richey – piano
- Hargus "Pig" Robbins – piano
- Jeffrey M. Tweel – piano
