= Mr. and Mrs. Used to Be (album) =

Studio album by Ernest Tubb and Loretta Lynn
- Released: August 2, 1965
- Recorded: March 10, 1964–January 19, 1965
- Studios: Columbia, Nashville, Tennessee
- Genre: Country
- Length: 30:56
- Label: Decca
- Producer: Owen Bradley

Ernest Tubb and Loretta Lynn chronology
Mr. and Mrs. Used to Be (1965)	Singin' Again (1967)

Loretta Lynn chronology
Blue Kentucky Girl (1965)	Mr. and Mrs. Used to Be (1965)	Hymns (1965)

Singles from Mr. and Mrs. Used to Be
- 1. "Mr. and Mrs. Used to Be" Released: June 22, 1964; 2. "Our Hearts Are Holding Hands" Released: May 10, 1965

Mr. and Mrs. Used to Be is the first collaborative studio album by American country music singers Ernest Tubb and Loretta Lynn. It was released on August 2, 1965, by Decca Records.

== Critical reception ==
Professional ratings
Review scores
Source	Rating
AllMusic	2/5 stars

Billboard published a review in the issue dated August 14, 1965, which said, "This album pairing two of the greatest names in country music, Ernest Tubb and Loretta Lynn, should be a great sales explosion. "Mr. and Mrs. Used to Be", a real tearjerker, is combined with the classic "A Dear John Letter" and the country hit "Just Between the Two of Us". All standouts."

== Commercial performance ==
The album debuted at No. 20 on the US Billboard Hot Country Albums chart dated October 9, 1965. It would later peak at No. 13 on the chart dated October 30. The album would spend a total of 10 weeks on the chart.

The album's first single, "Mr. and Mrs. Used to Be", was released in June 1964 and peaking at No. 11 on the US Billboard Hot Country Singles chart, the biggest hit the duo would achieve. The second single, "Our Hearts Are Holding Hands", was released in May 1965 and peaked at No. 24.

== Recording ==
Recording for the album took place over four sessions at the Columbia Recording Studio in Nashville, Tennessee, beginning on March 10, 1964. Three additional sessions followed on January 12, 18, and 19, 1965.

== Track listing ==
Side one
No.	Title	Writer(s)	Recording date	Length
1.	"Mr. and Mrs. Used to Be"	Billy Joe Deaton	March 10, 1964	2:41
2.	"I'll Just Call You Darlin'"	Johnny Colmus	March 10, 1964	2:25
3.	"I Reached for the Wine"	Joyce Ann Allsup	January 18, 1965	2:39
4.	"My Past Brought Me to You (Your Past Brought You to Me)"	Bill Brock	January 18, 1965	2:45
5.	"Are You Mine"	Don Grashey; Jim Armmadeo; Myrna Petrunka	January 12, 1965	2:41
6.	"Our Hearts Are Holding Hands"	Bill Anderson	January 19, 1965	2:36

Side two
No.	Title	Writer(s)	Recording date	Length
1.	"Keep Those Cards and Letter Coming In"	Harlan Howard	January 19, 1965	1:55
2.	"Just Between the Two of Us"	Liz Anderson	January 12, 1965	2:51
3.	"We're Not Kids Anymore"	Loretta Lynn	January 19, 1965	2:40
4.	"Love Was Right Here All the Time"	Billy Henson; Charles Snoddy	March 10, 1964	2:30
5.	"Two in the Cold"	Ellen Reeves	March 10, 1964	2:36
6.	"A Dear John Letter"	Billy Barton; Lewis Talley; Fuzzy Owen	January 18, 1965	2:37

== Personnel ==
Adapted from the Decca recording session records.

- Owen Bradley – producer
- Buddy Charleton – steel guitar
- Jack Drake – bass
- Jack Greene – drums
- Loretta Lynn – lead vocals
- Bill Pursell – piano
- Leon Rhodes – guitar
- Jerry Shook – guitar
- Cal Smith – guitar
- Jerry Smith – piano
- Ernest Tubb – lead vocals, liner notes

== Charts ==
Album

Chart (1965)	Peak position
US Hot Country Albums (Billboard)	13

Singles

Title	Year	Peak position	
Title	Year	US Country	CAN Country
"Mr. and Mrs. Used to Be"	1964	11	4
"Our Hearts Are Holding Hands"	1965	24	—
