= Ernest Tubb =

American country singer (1914–1984)

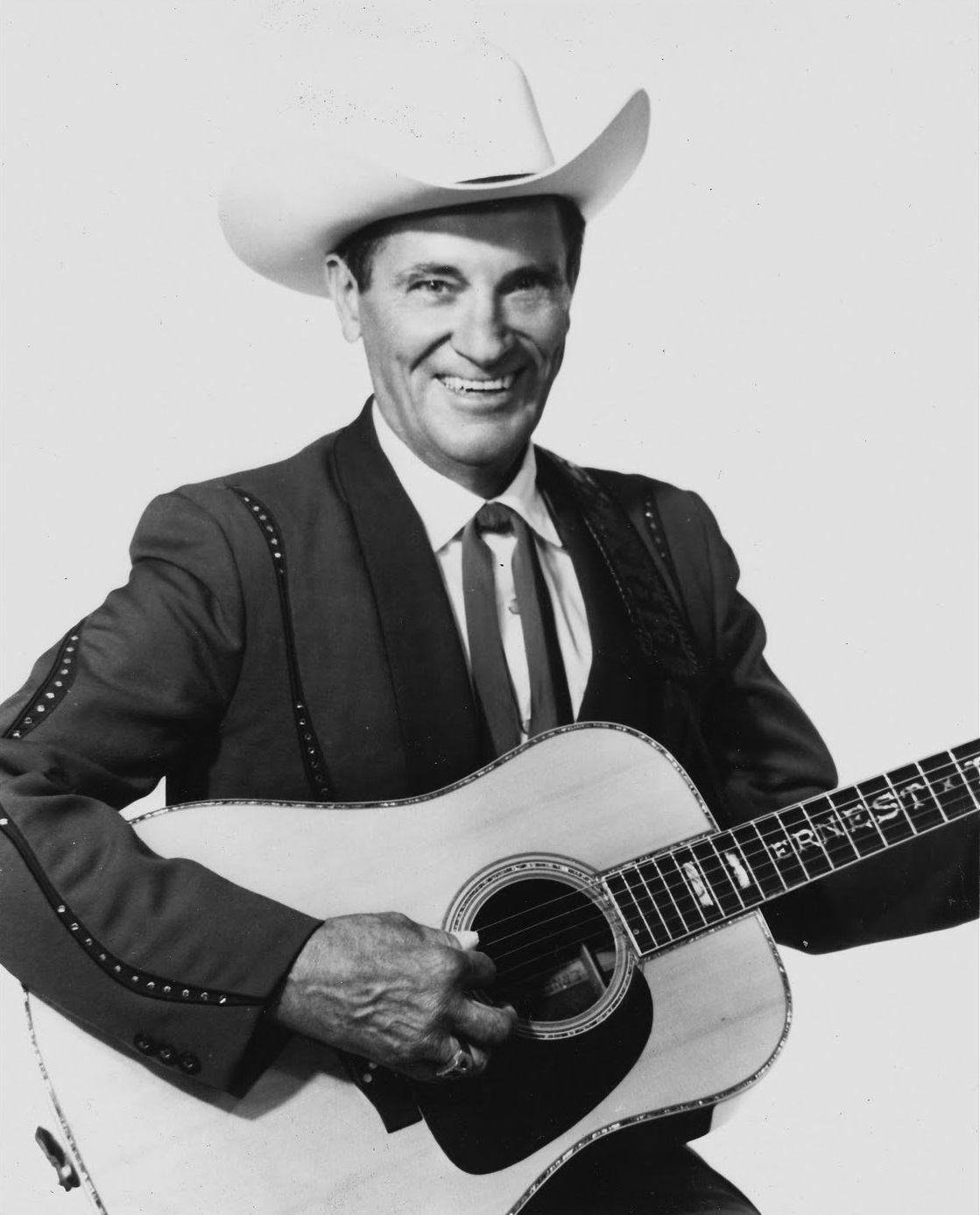
- Tubb, c. 1964

Background information
- Also known as: The Texas Troubadour
- Born: Ernest Dale Tubb; February 9, 1914; Crisp, Texas, U.S.
- Died: September 6, 1984 (aged 70) Nashville, Tennessee, U.S.
- Genres: Country; honky-tonk
- Occupations: Singer-songwriter, bandleader
- Instruments: Vocals, guitar
- Works: Ernest Tubb discography
- Years active: 1936–1982
- Labels: Bluebird, Decca, First Generation

Ernest Dale Tubb (February 9, 1914 – September 6, 1984), was an American singer, songwriter, and musician. Tubb is a pioneer of country music, and his 1941 song, "Walking the Floor Over You", marked the rise of the honky-tonk style of music.

In 1948, he was the first singer to record a hit version of Billy Hayes and Jay W. Johnson's "Blue Christmas", a song more commonly associated with Elvis Presley and his late-1950s version. Another well-known hit was his 1965 "Waltz Across Texas" (written by his nephew Quanah Talmadge Tubb, known professionally as Billy Talmadge), which became one of his most requested songs and is often used in dance halls throughout Texas during waltz lessons. Tubb recorded duets with the then up-and-coming Loretta Lynn in the early 1960s, including their hit "Sweet Thang". Tubb is a member of the Country Music Hall of Fame.

== Biography ==
=== Early years ===
The youngest of five children, Tubb was born on a cotton farm near Crisp, in Ellis County, Texas, United States. His father was a sharecropper and Tubb spent his youth working on farms throughout the state. Tubb's earliest immigrant ancestor was Edward Tubb, who arrived in Virginia from Northamptonshire, England in 1701.

He was inspired by Jimmie Rodgers and spent his spare time learning to sing, yodel, and play the guitar. At age 19, he took a job as a singer on San Antonio radio station KONO-AM. The pay was low and Tubb also dug ditches for the Works Progress Administration. He went on to be a clerk at a drug store.

In 1939, he moved to San Angelo, Texas and was hired to do a 15-minute afternoon live show on radio station KGKL-AM. He drove a beer delivery truck to support himself during this time, and during World War II he wrote and recorded a song titled "Swell San Angelo".

=== Recording career ===
In 1936, Tubb contacted Jimmie Rodgers' widow (Rodgers died in 1933) to ask for an autographed photo. A friendship developed and she was instrumental in getting Tubb a recording contract with RCA. His first two records were unsuccessful. A tonsillectomy in 1939 affected his singing style, so he turned to songwriting. In 1940, he switched to Decca Records to try singing again, and his sixth Decca release with the single "Walking the Floor Over You" brought Tubb to stardom. It sold over one million copies, and was awarded a gold disc in 1965 by the Recording Industry Association of America.

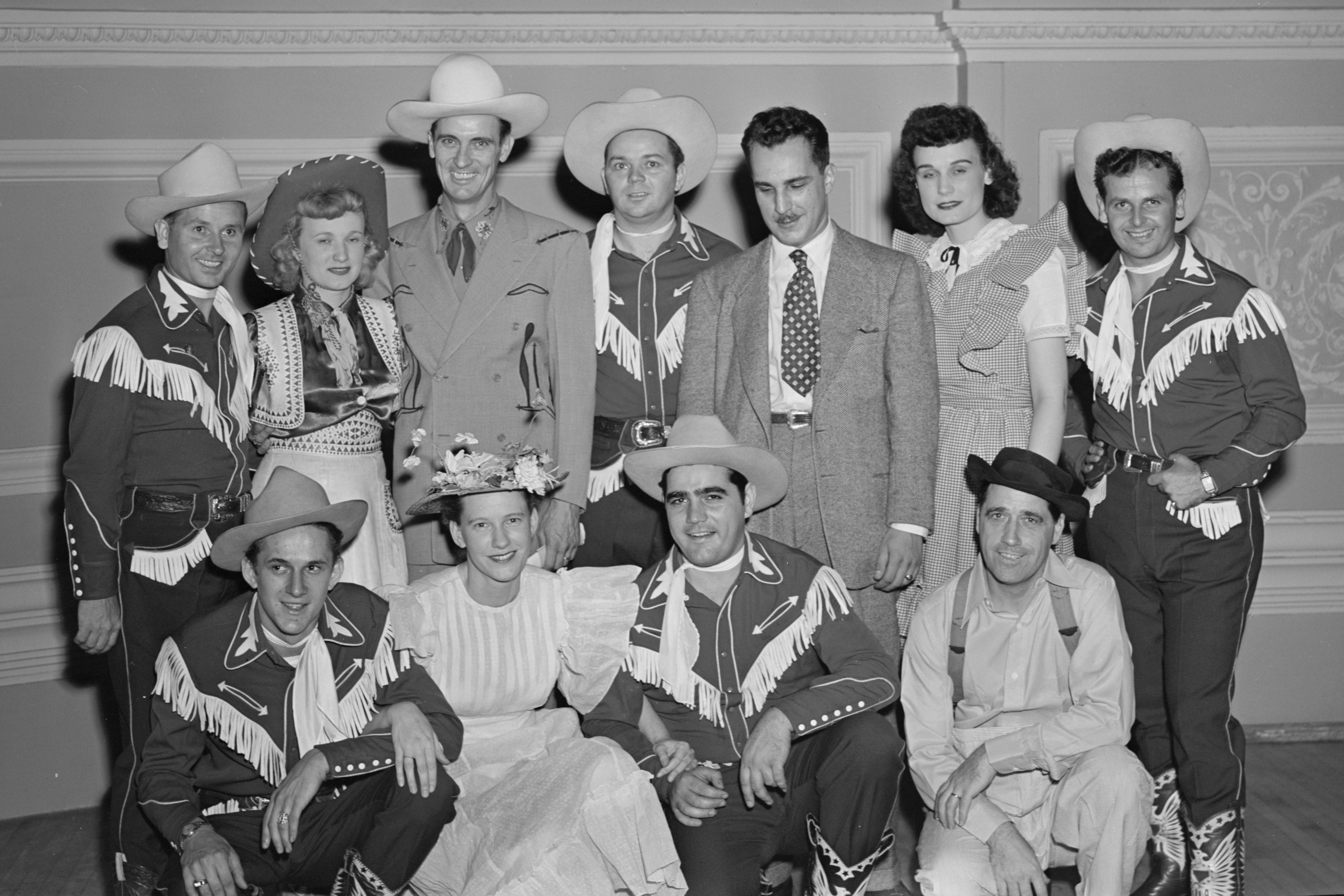
Tubb (third from left, back row) at Carnegie Hall in 1947

Tubb joined the Grand Ole Opry in February 1943 and put together his band, the Texas Troubadors. Tubb's first band members were from Gadsden, Alabama. They were Vernon "Toby" Reese, Chester Studdard, and Ray "Kemo" Head. He remained a regular on the radio show for four decades, and hosted his own Midnite Jamboree radio show each Saturday night after the Opry. Tubb headlined the first Grand Ole Opry show presented in Carnegie Hall in New York City in September 1947.

Tubb always surrounded himself with several of Nashville's best musicians. Jimmy Short, his first guitarist in the Troubadors, is credited with the Tubb sound of single-string guitar picking. From about 1943 to 1948, Short was featured in clean, clear riffs throughout Tubb's songs. Other well-known musicians to either travel with Tubb as band members or record on his records were steel guitarist Jerry Byrd and Tommy "Butterball" Paige, who replaced Short as Tubb's lead guitarist in 1947. Billy Byrd joined the Troubadors in 1949 and brought jazzy riffs to the instrumental interludes, especially the four-note riff at the end of his guitar solos that would become synonymous with Tubb's songs. A jazz musician, Byrd— no relation to Jerry— remained with Tubb until 1959.

Another Tubb musician was actually his producer, Owen Bradley. Bradley played piano on many of Tubb's recordings from the 1950s, but Tubb wanted him to sound like Moon Mullican, the honky-tonk piano great of that era. The classically-trained Bradley tried, but could not quite match the sound, so Tubb said Bradley was "half as good" as Moon. When Tubb called out Bradley's name at the start of one of the piano interludes, the singer always referred to him as "Half-Moon".

In 1949, Tubb helped the famed boogie-woogie Andrews Sisters crossover to the country charts when they teamed on Decca Records to record a cover of Eddy Arnold's "Don't Rob Another Man's Castle" and the Western swing-flavored "I'm Bitin' My Fingernails and Thinking of You". Tubb was impressed by the enormous success of Patty, Maxene, and LaVerne Andrews, and he remembered that their 1947 recording of "The Blue Tail Fly (Jimmy Crack Corn)" with folk legend Burl Ives produced a top-10 Billboard hit, and he was then eager to repeat that success. He brought the upbeat "Fingernails" tune to the session, hoping that the trio would like it, and they did. Not realizing how tall the Texas Troubadour was, the recording technicians at Decca had the sisters stand on a wooden box on one side of the one microphone they shared with Tubb so the audio would balance. The rhythm trio also was not used to Tubb's vocal style, as Maxene once remembered, "He sang different than anybody I've ever heard. He sang the melody of the song, but the timing was different. It wasn't like we were used to...you sing eight bars, and then you sing eight bars, and then you sing eight bars. Not with him. He just sang eight bars, ten bars, eleven bars, and then stopped, whatever it was. So, we'd just start to follow him, and then got paid on 750,000 records sold that never came above the Mason-Dixon Line!"

Tubb was not known to possess the most adept voice: he always sang flat and actually mocked his own singing. He told an interviewer that 95% of the men in bars would hear his music on the juke box and say to their girlfriends, "I can sing better than him," and Tubb added they would be right. In fact he noticeably missed some notes on some recordings. When Tubb was recording "You Don't Have to Be a Baby to Cry" in 1949 and tried to hit a low note, Red Foley, his duet partner at the time was sitting in the booth when somebody said, "I bet you wish you could hit that low note." Foley replied, "I bet Ernest wishes he could hit that note." The two, who released seven albums together, maintained a friendly on-air "feud" over the years, and Tubb appeared on Foley's Ozark Jubilee on ABC-TV.

In 1957, he walked into the lobby of the National Life Building in Nashville in the early morning hours and fired a .357 magnum, intending to shoot music producer Jim Denny. Instead, Tubb mistakenly shot at WSM news director, Bill Williams, as he was walking in to work. Luckily, Tubb barely missed (twice) before realizing he had shot at the wrong man. He was arrested and charged with public drunkenness.

In the 1960s, Tubb was well known for having one of the best bands in country music history. The band included lightning-fingered Leon Rhodes (1932–2017), who later appeared on TV's Hee Haw as the guitarist in the show's band. Buddy Emmons, another pedal-steel guitar virtuoso, began with Tubb in fall of 1957 and lasted through the early 1960s. Emmons went on to create a steel-guitar manufacturing company that bears his name. Buddy Charleton, one of the most accomplished pedal-steel guitarists known, joined Ernest in spring 1962 and continued to fall of 1973. Buddy Charleton and Leon Rhodes formed a nucleus for the Texas Troubadours that would be unsurpassed. Drummer Jack Greene joined the Texas Troubadours in 1962 and eventually graduated to becoming Tubb's opening act and a standout country singer himself.

Beginning in the fall of 1965, he hosted a half-hour TV program, The Ernest Tubb Show, which aired in first-run syndication for three years. That same year, he was inducted into the Country Music Hall of Fame, and in 1970, Tubb was inducted into the Nashville Songwriters Hall of Fame.

=== Later years ===
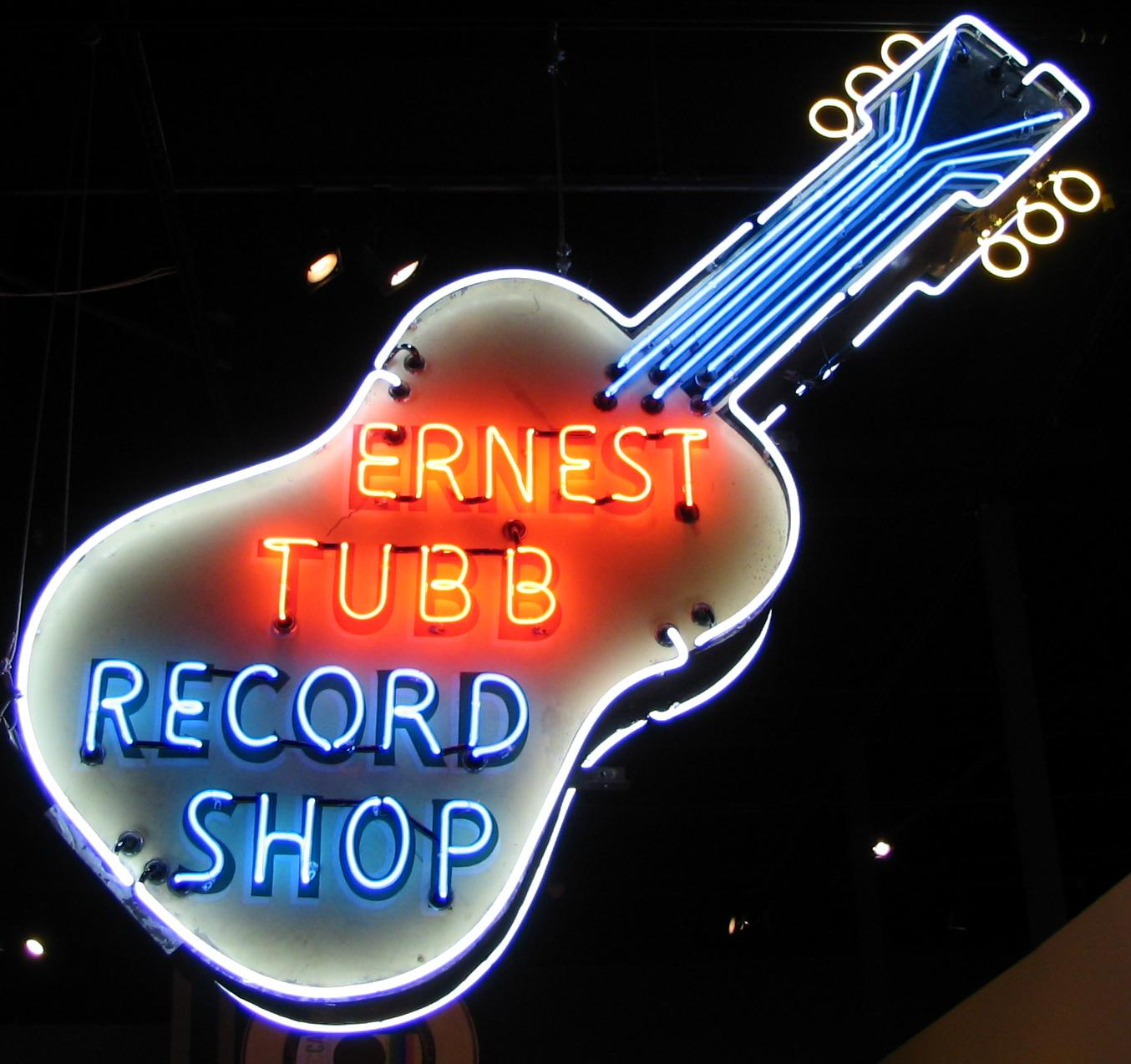
The original Ernest Tubb Record Shop sign from the Nashville, Tennessee, store on Broadway from the Tennessee State Museum

Tubb inspired some of the most devoted fans of any country artist — and his fans followed him throughout his career, long after the chart hits dried up. He remained, as did most of his peers, a fixture at the Grand Ole Opry, where he continued to appear. He continued to host his Midnite Jamboree radio program a few blocks away from the Opry at his record shop.

A notable release in 1979, The Legend and the Legacy, paired Tubb with a who's who of country singers on the Cachet Records label, to which Tubb was connected financially. This long out-of-print duets album was re-released in 1999 as a CD on the First Generations label, on the 20th anniversary of its release, and it quickly went out of print again.

In 1980, he appeared as himself in Loretta Lynn's autobiographical film, Coal Miner's Daughter with Roy Acuff and Minnie Pearl. His singing voice remained intact until late in life, when he fell ill with emphysema. Even so, he continued to make over 200 personal appearances a year, carrying an oxygen tank on his bus. After each performance, he would shake hands and sign autographs with every fan who wanted to stay. Health problems finally halted his performances in 1982; he made his final appearance on the Grand Ole Opry on August 15 of that year.

=== Death ===
Tubb died on September 6, 1984, at the Baptist Hospital in Nashville from emphysema. He is buried in Nashville's Hermitage Memorial Gardens.

== Legacy ==
Tubb was inducted into the Texas Country Music Hall of Fame in 1999, and he ranked No. 21 in CMT's 40 Greatest Men of Country Music in 2003.

One of his sons, Justin, was a popular country singer and songwriter in the mid-1950s through the early 1960s; Justin's sons, Carey and Zachary Tubb, also became musicians. Tubb's nephew, Billy Lee Tubb, was his lead guitarist briefly (fall 1959 – April 1960). He also had solo careers under several pseudonyms (Ronny Wade, X. Lincoln) and played with John Anderson, writing several songs with him. Tubb's great nephew, Lucky Tubb, has toured with Hank Williams III.

Cal Smith, who played guitar for the Texas Troubadours during the 1960s, went on to a successful country music career of his own in the 1970s, recording hits such as "Country Bumpkin".

Jack Greene, who played drums for the Texas Troubadours, went on to become a successful country music star following his departure from Tubb's band, recording the hits "There Goes My Everything" and "Statue of a Fool".

Ernest Tubb's nephew, Glenn Douglas Tubb, wrote his first hit song for his uncle in 1952. He went on to write more than 50 hit songs for more than two dozen country and rock music superstars, including Bob Dylan, Johnny Cash, BJ Thomas, George Jones, Kentucky Headhunters, Charley Pride, Ann Murray, and Kitty Wells. Glenn Tubb won a Grammy Award for "Skip a Rope", which was made a hit by Henson Cargill. Glenn Douglas Tubb died in 2021.

Beatles drummer Ringo Starr has also been open about Tubb's inspiration on him as well.

The Midnite Jamboree Tubb founded in 1947 continues to air, recorded each weekend from a stage at his record shop and airing after each episode of the Grand Ole Opry.

The song "Set 'Em Up Joe", recorded and made famous by Vern Gosdin, was a tribute to Tubb's music, particularly the song "Walking the Floor Over You". The Ernest Tubb Record Store, founded in 1947, is still in operation in Nashville and is now owned by Robert's Western World. On March 11, 2022, the store owners announced on their Facebook page that the business and its real estate had been sold, and the store would close at an unspecified time.
