= You Ain't Woman Enough =

Studio album by Loretta Lynn
- Released: September 12, 1966
- Recorded: November 15, 1965–April 11, 1966
- Studio: Columbia, Nashville, Tennessee; RCA Victor, Nashville, Tennessee
- Genre: Country
- Length: 26:53
- Label: Decca
- Producer: Owen Bradley

Loretta Lynn chronology
I Like 'Em Country (1966)	You Ain't Woman Enough (1966)	Country Christmas (1966)

Singles from You Ain't Woman Enough
- 1. "You Ain't Woman Enough" Released: May 9, 1966

You Ain't Woman Enough is the seventh solo studio album by American country music singer-songwriter Loretta Lynn. It was released on September 12, 1966, by Decca Records. It was Lynn's first No. 1 album on the US Billboard Hot Country Albums chart, as well as her first album to chart on the Billboard Top LPs chart.

The album includes five Lynn compositions, one of which was co-written with other songwriters. The album also features cover versions of previous hits by other artists, including Nancy Sinatra's "These Boots Are Made for Walkin'" and Dolly Parton's "Put It Off Until Tomorrow".

== Critical reception ==
Professional ratings
Review scores
Source	Rating
AllMusic	4/5 stars

Cashbox published a review in the issue dated September 24, 1966, which said, "With the title tune of this set having recently hit the Number 1 spot on the Country charts, Loretta Lynn should sell heaps of LP’s in a growing country market. The lark offers fans, in addition to the click, top reading of such strong tunes as "These Boots Are Made For Walkin’", "God Gave Me a Heart to Forgive", and "Put It Off Until Tomorrow". Watch this package score sales aplenty in no time at all."

AllMusic gave the album a positive review, calling Lynn's recording of the Wilburn Brothers' hit "It's Another World" an "excellent version" of their song.

== Commercial performance ==
The album debuted at No. 29 on the US Billboard Hot Country Albums chart dated October 8, 1966. It peaked at No. 1 on the chart dated November 12 and became Lynn's first album to top the chart. The album was also Lynn's first album to appear on the US Billboard Top LP's chart, where it peaked at No. 140 on the chart dated March 25, 1967.

The album's only single, "You Ain't Woman Enough", was released in May 1966 and became Lynn's biggest hit up to that point, peaking at No. 2 on the US Billboard Hot Country Singles chart.

"A Man I Hardly Know" charted in 1967 at No. 72 when it was released as the B-side of "If You're Not Gone Too Long" from Lynn's 1967 album, Singin' with Feelin'.

== Recording ==
Recording of the album took place over three sessions at two studios. The first two sessions on January 13 and March 22, 1966, were held at the Columbia Recording Studios in Nashville, Tennessee. The final session for the album was on April 11, 1966, at the RCA Victor Studio in Nashville. "You Ain't Woman Enough" was recorded on November 15, 1965, during a session for 1966's I Like 'Em Country, at Columbia Recording Studio.

== Track listing ==
Side one
No.	Title	Writer(s)	Recording date	Length
1.	"You Ain't Woman Enough"	Loretta Lynn	November 15, 1965	2:11
2.	"Put It Off Until Tomorrow"	Bill Owens; Dolly Parton	March 22, 1966	2:28
3.	"These Boots Are Made for Walkin'"	Lee Hazlewood	April 11, 1966	2:18
4.	"God Gave Me a Heart to Forgive"	Iva Cummings; Bob Cummings; Barbara Cummings; Lynn	January 13, 1966	2:54
5.	"Keep Your Change"	Lynn	January 13, 1966	1:52
6.	"Someone Before Me"	Bobby Hicks	April 11, 1966	2:12

Side two
No.	Title	Writer(s)	Recording date	Length
1.	"The Darkest Day"	Lynn	April 11, 1966	2:08
2.	"Tippy Toeing"	Bobby Harden	March 22, 1966	1:52
3.	"Talking to the Wall"	Warner MacPherson; Bill Montague	March 22, 1966	2:29
4.	"A Man I Hardly Know"	Lynn	January 13, 1966	2:05
5.	"Is It Wrong (For Loving You)"	MacPherson	March 22, 1966	2:24
6.	"It's Another World"	Richard D. Statler	April 11, 1966	2:00

== Personnel ==
Adapted from the Decca recording session records.

- Willie Ackerman – drums
- Harold Bradley – electric bass guitar
- Owen Bradley – producer
- David Briggs – piano
- Fred Carter – electric guitar
- Floyd Cramer – piano
- Ray Edenton – acoustic guitar
- Lloyd Green – steel guitar
- Buddy Harman – drums
- Kelso Herston – guitar
- Junior Huskey – bass
- The Jordanaires – background vocals
- Loretta Lynn – lead vocals
- Grady Martin – electric guitar
- Hal Rugg – steel guitar
- Pete Wade – guitar
- Joe Zinkan – bass

== Charts ==
Album

Chart (1966–1967)	Peak position
US Hot Country Albums (Billboard)	1
US Top LP's (Billboard)	140

Singles

Title	Year	Peak position
Title	Year	US Country
"You Ain't Woman Enough"	1966	2

Charted B-sides

Title	Year	Peak position	A-side
Title	Year	US Country	A-side
"A Man I Hardly Know"	1967	72	"If You're Not Gone Too Long"
