= Sunday Morning with Nat Stuckey and Connie Smith =

Studio album by Nat Stuckey and Connie Smith
- Released: January 1970; June 11, 2002
- Recorded: December 9 – 11, 1969
- Studio: RCA Victor Studios
- Genre: Country gospel; sacred
- Label: RCA Victor
- Producer: Bob Ferguson; Felton Jarvis

Connie Smith chronology
Back in Baby's Arms (1969)	Sunday Morning with Nat Stuckey and Connie Smith (1970)	The Best of Connie Smith Volume II (1970)

Nat Stuckey chronology
New Country Roads (1969)	Sunday Morning with Nat Stuckey and Connie Smith (1970)	Old Man Willis (1970)

Singles from Sunday Morning with Nat Stuckey and Connie Smith
- 1. "If God Is Dead (Who's That Living in My Soul)" Released: February 1970

God Will cover
- In 2002, the album was re-issued on a new label and renamed.

Sunday Morning with Nat Stuckey and Connie Smith is the second collaborative studio album by American country artists Nat Stuckey and Connie Smith, released in January 1970 by RCA Victor. The album was a collection of country gospel songs performed as duets by both artists and the pair's first album of religious music. Included was the song "If God Is Dead (Who's That Living in My Soul)". Released as a single, the song charted in the top 60 of the American country chart in 1970. The album received a positive review from Billboard magazine following its release. In 2002, the album was re-released under the title God Will and included a twelfth track.

== Background ==
Nat Stuckey and Connie Smith were signed to the RCA Victor label as solo artists during the 1960s. After first breaking through with the 1966 top five single "Sweet Thang", Nat Stuckey had several more top ten singles with RCA including "Plastic Saddle". In 1964, Connie Smith's career was launched with her debut single called "Once a Day". Spending eight weeks at the top of the American country chart, the song set forth a series of top ten singles during the decade on RCA. The duo first collaborated together in 1969 with the country studio album Young Love. Included on the disc was a cover of the gospel song, "Whispering Hope". The song inspired the creating of a gospel album between the pair. It was also an opportunity for Smith to record more gospel material, after becoming a Christian in 1968 and pushing for more gospel material on recording sessions. "I wanted to do a gospel record at that point, so this was a way to record one," recalled Smith in 2012.

== Recording and content ==
Stuckey and Smith recorded the tracks for Sunday Morning over the course of three days: December 9, December 10 and December 11, 1969. The sessions took place at the RCA Victor Studios, located in Nashville, Tennessee. The recordings were produced by Bob Ferguson and Felton Jarvis. It was the second album project pairing for Ferguson and Jarvis. Both producers had originally paired the performers together in 1969 for their first album. A total of eleven tracks (all recorded as duets) comprised the project. Some of the album's tracks were cover versions of previously recorded country gospel and sacred songs. Among these covers was Johnny Cash's "Daddy Sang Bass". The song was requested by Bob Ferguson to include on the project. Also included was a cover of Cash's "He Turned Water into Wine" and the gospel track "Crumbs from the Table". Other recordings were composed by popular Nashville songwriters such as John D. Loudermilk, Cindy Walker and Marijohn Wilkin.

== Release and reception ==
Sunday Morning with Nat Stuckey and Connie Smith was released in January 1970 on the RCA Victor label. It was the eighth studio album of Stuckey's career and the fifteenth studio album of Smith's. The project was originally issued by the label as a vinyl LP, containing six songs on "side one" and five songs on "side two". According to biographer Barry Mazor, the cover photo was taken "at two completely different times and places by two different photographers" because Smith was involved in a car accident which setback album photos. In February 1970, Billboard magazine gave the album a positive response. "The coupling of Nat Stuckey and Connie Smith in an album of sacred material cannot fail to prove a powerful lure to country buyers," reviewers commented.

Decades later, the album was re-issued to digital and streaming markets through Sony Music Entertainment.

Following its original release, there were requests to radio for the album's track "If God Is Dead (Who's That Living in My Soul)". This demand led to RCA Victor releasing the song as a single in February 1970. The song later charted on the American Billboard Hot Country Songs chart, peaking at number 59 in 1970. In 2002, the album was re-released via a compact disc and cassette through the label Music Row Talent Records. However, the album was re-titled with a different cover photo under the name God Will. A total of 12 tracks was included on the disc. The additional twelfth track was the duo's cover of "Whispering Hope", which was pulled from their 1969 Young Love album.

== Sunday Morning track listings ==
=== Vinyl version ===
Side one
No.	Title	Writer(s)	Length
1.	"Sunday Morning"	Dick Heard; Van Trevor	NA
2.	"His Love Takes Care of Me"	Jimmy Peppers	NA
3.	"Crumbs from the Table"	Barbara Miller	NA
4.	"Daddy Sang Bass"	Carl Perkins	NA
5.	"Now Lord What Can I Do for You"	Ira Louvin; Anne Young	NA
6.	"Well It's All Right"	Cindy Walker	NA

Side two
No.	Title	Writer(s)	Length
1.	"If God Is Dead (Who's That Living in My Soul)"	Lawrence Reynolds	NA
2.	"He Turned the Water Into Wine"	Johnny Cash	NA
3.	"Way Up on the Mountain"	Louvin; Young	NA
4.	"God Will"	John D. Loudermilk; Marijohn Wilkin	NA
5.	"Did You Let Your Light Shine"	Miller	NA

=== Digital version ===
Sunday Morning with Nat Stuckey and Connie Smith (download and streaming)
No.	Title	Writer(s)	Length
1.	"Sunday Morning"	Heard; Trevor	2:18
2.	"His Love Takes Care of Me"	Peppers	2:31
3.	"Crumbs from the Table"	Miller	3:28
4.	"Daddy Sang Bass"	Perkins	2:25
5.	"Now Lord What Can I Do for You"	Louvin; Young	3:10
6.	"Well It's All Right"	Walker	3:04
7.	"If God Is Dead (Then Who's This Living in My Soul)"	Reynolds	2:54
8.	"He Turned the Water Into Wine"	Cash	3:11
9.	"Way Up on the Mountain"	Louvin; Young	2:35
10.	"God Will"	Loudermilk; Wilkin	2:27
11.	"Did You Let Your Light Shine"	Miller	2:30

== God Will track listings ==
=== Compact disc and digital versions ===
God Will (CD, download and streaming)
No.	Title	Writer(s)	Length
1.	"God Will"	Loudermilk; Wilkin	2:27
2.	"Now Lord What Can I Do for You"	Louvin; Young	3:10
3.	"Well It's All Right"	Walker	3:13
4.	"Crumbs from the Table"	Miller	3:26
5.	"Did You Let Your Light Shine"	Miller	2:38
6.	"Sunday Morning"	Heard; Trevor	2:17
7.	"Daddy Sang Bass"	Perkins	2:25
8.	"Way Up on the Mountain"	Louvin; Young	2:33
9.	"His Love Takes Care of Me"	Peppers	2:30
10.	"He Turned the Water Into Wine"	Cash	3:11
11.	"If God Is Dead (Then Who's This Living in My Soul)"	Reynolds	2:54
12.	"Whispering Hope"	Alice Hawthorne; Alton Howard	3:42

=== Cassette version ===
Side one
No.	Title	Writer(s)	Length
1.	"God Will"	Loudermilk; Wilkin	NA
2.	"Now Lord What Can I Do for You"	Louvin; Young	NA
3.	"Well It's All Right"	Walker	NA
4.	"Crumbs from the Table"	Miller	NA
5.	"Did You Let Your Light Shine"	Miller	NA
6.	"Sunday Morning"	Heard; Trevor	NA

Side two
No.	Title	Writer(s)	Length
1.	"Daddy Sang Bass"	Perkins	NA
2.	"Way Up on the Mountain"	Louvin; Young	NA
3.	"His Love Takes Care of Me"	Peppers	NA
4.	"He Turned the Water Into Wine"	Cash	NA
5.	"If God Is Dead (Then Who's This Living in My Soul)"	Reynolds	NA
6.	"Whispering Hope"	Hawthorne; Howard	NA

== Personnel ==
All credits are taken from the original studio sessions, which are adapted from the biography booklet by Barry Mazor titled Just for What I Am.

Musical personnel

- Joseph Babcock – Background vocals
- Bobby L. Dyson – Bass
- Dolores Edgin – Background vocals
- Kossie Gardner – Organ
- Johnny Gimble – Fiddle
- Buddy Harman – Drums
- Weldon Myrick – Steel guitar, leader
- June Page – Background vocals
- Hargus "Pig" Robbins – Piano
- Billy Sanford – Electric guitar
- Connie Smith – Lead vocals
- Nat Stuckey – Lead vocals
- Pete Wade – Electric guitar
- Hurshel Wiginton – Background vocals
- Chip Young – Rhythm guitar

Technical personnel

- Bob Ferguson – Producer
- Jake Hess – Liner notes
- Felton Jarvis – Producer
- Al Pachucki – Recording engineer
- Roy Shockley – Recording technician

== Release history ==
Region	Title	Date	Format	Label	Ref.
North America	Sunday Morning with Nat Stuckey and Connie Smith	January 1970	Vinyl	RCA Victor Records	
North America	God Will	June 11, 2002	Compact disc; cassette	Music Row Talent Records	
North America	Sunday Morning with Nat Stuckey and Connie Smith	2010s	Music download; streaming	Sony Music Entertainment	
North America	God Will	2010s	Music download; streaming	Sony Music Entertainment	
