= Butcher Hollow, Kentucky =

Unincorporated community in Kentucky, United States

- Unincorporated community
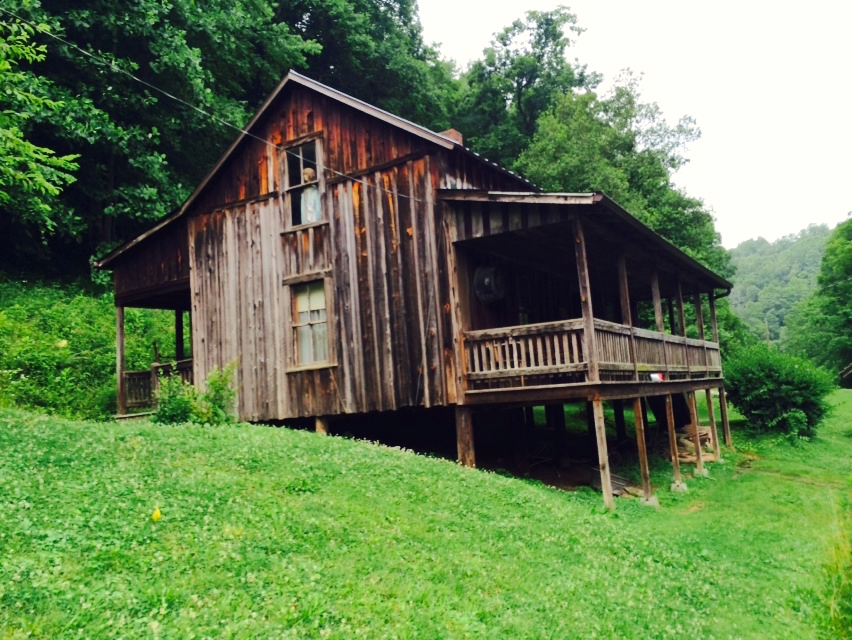
- Childhood home of Loretta Lynn and Crystal Gayle

- Location within Kentucky Location within the United States
- Coordinates: 37°46′44″N 82°42′58″W
- Country: United States
- State: Kentucky
- County: Johnson
- Elevation: 709 ft (216 m)
- Time zone: UTC-5 (Eastern (EST))
  - Summer (DST): UTC-4 (EDT)
- ZIP Code: 41265
- Area code: 606
- GNIS feature ID: 488497

Butcher Hollow (also known and most commonly pronounced as Butcher Holler) is a coal-mining community located in Johnson County, Kentucky, United States.

== History ==
The town is the birthplace of country singer Loretta Lynn, one of her sisters, Peggy Sue (singer), and her brother, Jay Lee Webb. Lynn paid tribute to Butcher Hollow in the song "Coal Miner's Daughter", which begins with the lyrics

Well, I was born'd a coal miner's daughter. In a cabin on a hill in Butcher Holler.

Later in the song, she also mentions Van Lear, the larger community in which Butcher Hollow is located:

My daddy worked all night in the Van Lear coal mines. All day long in the fields a-hoein' corn

Butcher Hollow took the name of a nearby valley which was named for the local Butcher family. Butcher Hollow is a part of the community of Van Lear, which was constructed by the Consolidation Coal Company in the early part of the 20th century. Van Lear was named for Van Lear Black, one of the company's directors. Although most of Butcher Hollow lies outside of the old Van Lear city limits, the mailing address of those who have lived there has been Van Lear since the establishment of the Van Lear post office in 1909. Butcher Hollow is not an independent town or village in its own right. Currently, Van Lear is an unincorporated community. There are no deep mines operating in Van Lear proper, although some mines operate nearby. Most of the residents work in locations outside Van Lear, including the nearby cities of Paintsville, Prestonsburg, and Pikeville. Since the end of local mining, only a handful of businesses continue to operate in the Van Lear area, including a bookstore, Mine Number 5 Store, The East Kentucky Museum of Mysteries, and Icky's 1950s Snack Shop (located inside the Coal Miners' Museum).

Although Butcher Hollow is often listed as a separate town, it is geographically considered a street or a neighborhood by natives of Eastern Kentucky. Thus, Butcher Hollow's address would be Butcher Hollow, Van Lear, Johnson County, Kentucky.

== See also ==
- Coal Miners' Museum
- Mine No. 5 Store
- Van Lear, Kentucky
