= The Time Jumpers =

Musical group

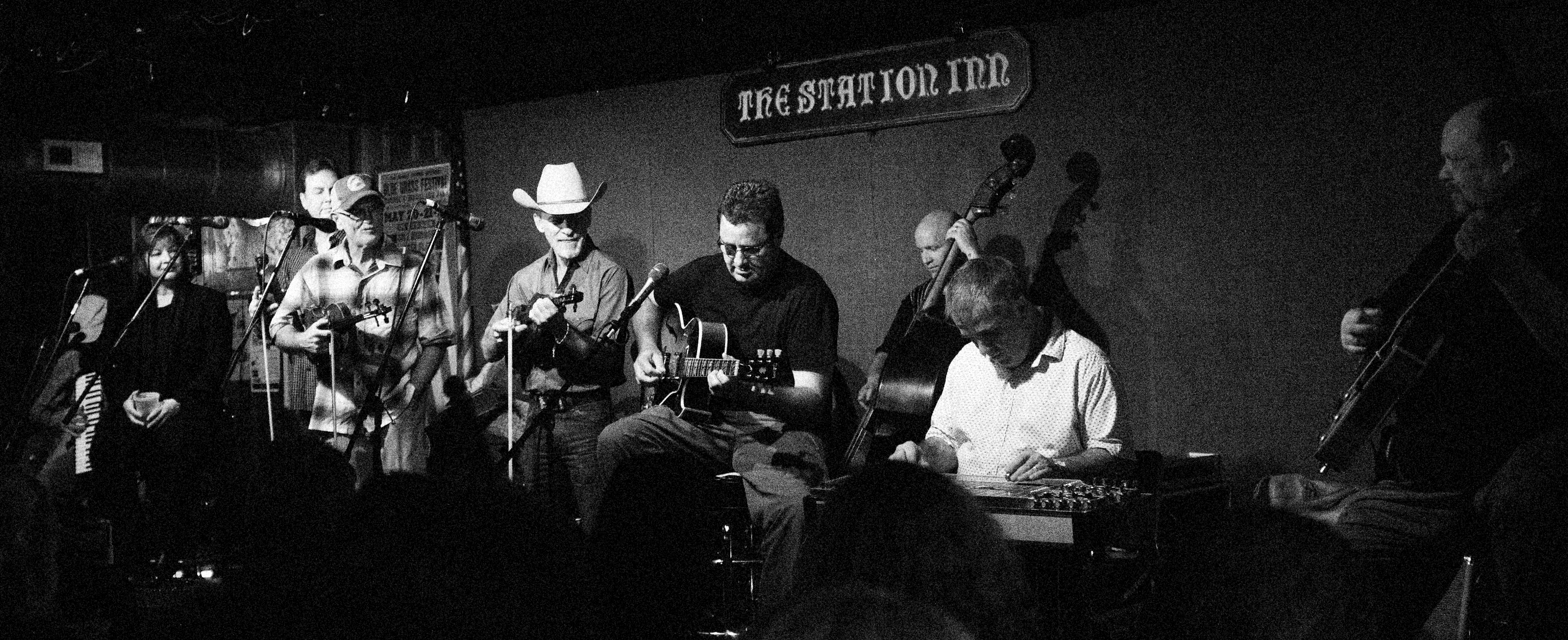
The Time Jumpers performing at the Station Inn in 2011

The Time Jumpers is a Western swing band formed in 1998 by a group of Nashville studio musicians who enjoyed jamming together. Country star Vince Gill was a member of the group between 2010 and 2020. The 11–member group started playing occasional local gigs until they agreed to take a regular slot playing at the Station Inn, a venerable Nashville bluegrass venue. They later moved to a larger venue, Nashville's "3rd & Lindsley", and were called by Tennessean writer Juli Thanki, "One of the hottest shows in town". Some of their guest artists on the weekly live show have included Joe Walsh, Robert Plant, Norah Jones, Bonnie Raitt, Reba McEntire, Jimmy Buffett, Kings of Leon, and Toby Keith. Amy Grant said, "You can't hear that caliber of musicians every Monday night for a cover charge in any town in America except here". The group rarely travels, but in 2010 they performed at New York's Lincoln Center. In 2007, they recorded a live album entitled Jumpin' Time and in 2012 recorded The Time Jumpers. At the 2017 Grammy Awards the group won "Best American Roots Song" for Vince Gill's composition "Kid Sister".

We're the Time Jumpers

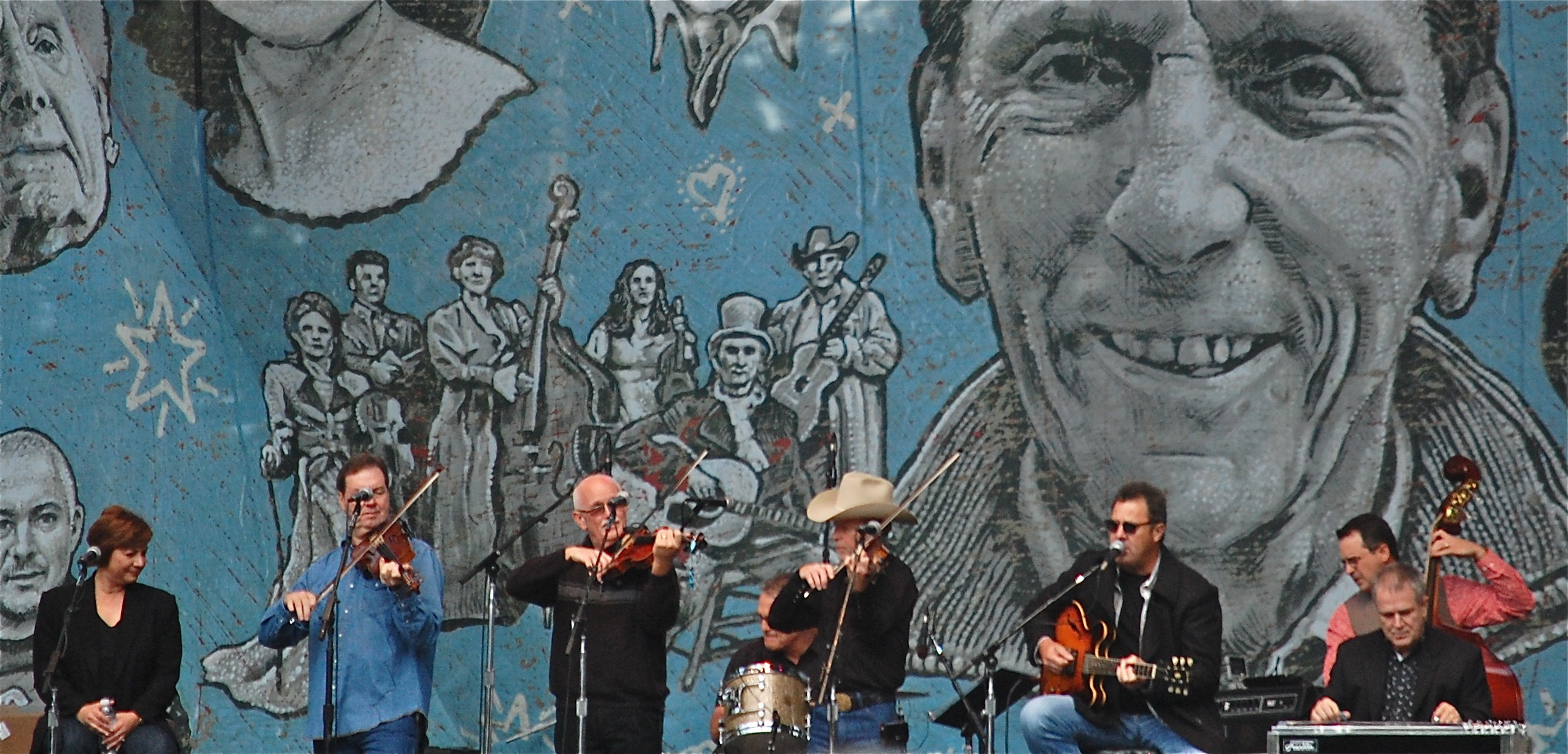
The Time Jumpers performing in Golden Gate Park in 2012

== Band members ==
The group's lineup has changed frequently. Some of the musicians involved have included:

- Brad Albin – bass
- Michael Blaustone – drums
- Robert Bowlin – fiddle
- Johnny Cox – steel guitar
- Dennis Crouch – bass
- Larry Franklin – fiddle
- Paul Franklin – steel guitar
- Vince Gill – vocals, guitar (2010-2020)
- Doug (Ranger Doug) Green – vocals, guitar
- Adie Grey – vocals
- Aubrey Haynie – fiddle
- Hoot Hester – vocals
- John Hughey – steel guitar
- Kenny LeMasters – steel guitar, guitar
- Kenny Malone – drums
- Carolyn Martin – vocals
- Danny Parks – guitar
- Andy Reiss – guitar
- Dawn Sears – vocals
- Kenny Sears – fiddle
- Joe Spivey – vocals, fiddle
- Jeff Taylor – vocals, accordion
- Billy Thomas – drums
- Rick Vanaugh – drums
- Wendy Moten - vocals
- Eddy Dunlap - Pedal Steel
- Justin Branum - fiddle
- Chris Walters - piano

== Discography ==
=== Albums ===
Title	Details	Peak chart positions		Sales
Title	Details	US Country	US Heat	Sales
Jumpin' Time	Release date: 2007; Label: Crosswind	—	—	
The Time Jumpers	Release date: September 11, 2012; Label: Rounder Records	38	10	US: 28,000
Kid Sister	Release date: September 9, 2016; Label: Rounder Records	25	6	US: 2,100
"—" denotes releases that did not chart

=== Music videos ===
Year	Title	Director
2012	"On the Outskirts of Town"	Marcel
2016	"I Miss You"	Adam Jones

== Collaborations ==
- Performed with Reba McEntire on the song "If You're Not Gone Too Long" from Coal Miner's Daughter: A Tribute To Loretta Lynn (2010).
- Performed with LeAnn Rimes on the song "Blue" from Lady & Gentlemen (2011).
- Performed with Vince Gill on the song "Buttermilk John" from Guitar Slinger (2011).
- Performed with Miranda Lambert on the song "All That's Left" from Platinum (2014).
- Performed with Asleep at the Wheel on the song "Faded Love" from Still the King: Celebrating the Music of Bob Wills and His Texas Playboys (2015).
- Performed with Willie Nelson on the album For the Good Times: A Tribute to Ray Price (2016).

== Awards and nominations ==
=== Grammy Awards ===
Year	Nominee / work	Award	Result
2013	"On The Outskirts of Town"	Best Country Duo/Group Performance	Nominated
2013	The Time Jumpers	Best Country Album	Nominated
2017	"Kid Sister"	Best American Roots Song	Won
2017	Kid Sister	Best Americana Album	Nominated
