= Robert Bowlin =

- Born: September 22, 1955 (age 70)
- Origin: Pocahontas, Arkansas, United States
- Genres: Bluegrass; Country
- Occupation: Musician
- Instruments: Guitar; Fiddle; Mandolin
- Years active: 197x-present
- Label: FGM Records
- Website: http://www.robertbowlin.com

Robert Bowlin (born September 22, 1956 in Pocahontas, Arkansas) is an American bluegrass and country musician.

== Biography ==
Bowlin started playing ukulele when he was one, and by the time he was five years old he had picked up the guitar.

In 1978, Bowlin won second place in the National Guitar Flat Pick Championship at the Walnut Valley Festival, in Winfield, Kansas. The next year, in 1979, he won first place in the festival's Finger Style Guitar Championship.

In the 1980s, Bowlin was a sideman to artists like Maura O'Connell and Kathy Mattea, the latter whom he appeared with on the popular television program, "Austin City Limits".

In 1993, Bowlin was chosen to fill the fiddle spot in Bill Monroe's Bluegrass Boys. This job would last until 1996. The band played the Grand Ole Opry, and a few months later, Monroe died.

Following Monroe's passing, Bowlin turned to recording sessions with Tom T. Hall, the Osborne Brothers, Boxcar Willie, and Hank Thompson, among others. In addition, Bowlin has toured with artists such as Ray Price, Bobby Bare, Faron Young, and Ricky Van Shelton.

At one point, he was a member of the swing band The Time Jumpers, a band that often plays The Station Inn and for a decade featured Vince Gill.

In 2007, FGM Records, the recording arm of Flatpicking Guitar Magazine, released his debut CD, "Six String Soliloquy", which features sixteen instrumentals played on acoustic guitar with a flatpick.

From 2004 through present, Bowlin left the road with the major country and bluegrass stars and chose to perform with singer-songwriter Wil Maring . In this duo formation, he is able to feature his own original songs and guitar instrumentals.

In 2008, Bowlin won first place in the Fiddle, Flatpicking Guitar and Mandolin categories at the Uncle Dave Macon Days Festival in Murfreesboro, Tennessee.

He is an accomplished instructor, teaching a semester in the bluegrass program at East Tennessee State University, and he has held workshops at music camps and stores across the United States.
