= Don't Come Home a Drinkin' (With Lovin' on Your Mind) =

Studio album by Loretta Lynn
- Released: February 6, 1967
- Recorded: November 15, 1965 – November 17, 1966
- Studio: Bradley's Barn (Mount Juliet, Tennessee); Columbia (Nashville, Tennessee)
- Genre: Country
- Length: 28:24
- Label: Decca
- Producer: Owen Bradley

Loretta Lynn chronology
Country Christmas (1966)	Don't Come Home a Drinkin' (With Lovin' on Your Mind) (1967)	Singin' Again (1967)

Singles from Don't Come Home a Drinkin' (With Lovin' on Your Mind)
- 1. "Don't Come Home a Drinkin' (With Lovin' on Your Mind)" Released: October 17, 1966

Don't Come Home a Drinkin' (With Lovin' on Your Mind) is the ninth solo studio album by American country music singer-songwriter Loretta Lynn. It was released on February 6, 1967, by Decca Records.

== Critical reception ==
Professional ratings
Review scores
Source	Rating
AllMusic	5/5 stars

In the issue dated February 18, 1967, Billboard published a review of the album that said, "Top country stylist assembled a winning program of good country tunes, old and new, and delivers them in her own distinct style. Her touching performance of "There Goes My Everything" is contrasted by the rhythm arrangement of "The Devil Gets His Dues" and "I Got Caught". Bound to be a sales giant."

Cashbox also published a review in the February 18 issue which said, "Loretta Lynn has taken the title of her current smash single "Don’t Come Home a Drinkin' (With Lovin’ on Your Mind)" for her new LP and come up with a package that all of her fans should be eager to hear. Besides the title song, Loretta offers such well known country tunes as "There Goes My Everything", "The Shoe Goes on the Other Foot Tonight", and "I'm Living in Two Worlds". Should be a big one for Loretta here."

AllMusic gave the album a positive review, rating it five stars and calling her choice of cover versions as something that "suits her perfectly", including her cover version of Ernest Tubb's "The Shoe Goes on the Other Foot Tonight".

== Commercial performance ==
The album peaked at No. 1 on the US Billboard Hot Country Albums chart. The album also peaked at No. 80 on the US Billboard Top LP's chart. The album was the first by a female country singer to be certified Gold by the RIAA.

The album's only single, "Don't Come Home a Drinkin' (With Lovin' on Your Mind)" was released in October 1966 and peaked at No. 1 on the US Billboard Hot Country Singles chart, becoming Lynn's first No. 1 single.

== Recording ==
Recording for the album took place at Bradley's Barn in Mount Juliet, Tennessee, over four sessions, beginning on July 16, 1966. Three more sessions would follow on October 3, October 5, and November 17. "Saint to a Sinner" was recorded during the November 15, 1965 session for 1966's I Like 'Em Country, at Columbia Recording Studios in Nashville.

== Track listing ==
Side one
No.	Title	Writer(s)	Recording date	Length
1.	"Don't Come Home a Drinkin' (With Lovin' on Your Mind)"	Loretta Lynn; Peggy Sue Wells	October 5, 1966	2:06
2.	"I Really Don't Want to Know"	Howard Barnes; Don Robertson	November 17, 1966	2:56
3.	"Tomorrow Never Comes"	Johnny Bond; Ernest Tubb	October 3, 1966	2:42
4.	"There Goes My Everything"	Dallas Frazier	November 17, 1966	2:46
5.	"The Shoe Goes on the Other Foot Tonight"	Buddy Mize	October 3, 1966	2:30
6.	"Saint to a Sinner"	Betty Sue Perry	November 15, 1965	2:27

Side two
No.	Title	Writer(s)	Recording date	Length
1.	"The Devil Gets His Dues"	Darrell Statler	July 16, 1966	2:14
2.	"I Can't Keep Away from You"	Statler	October 5, 1966	2:00
3.	"I'm Living in Two Worlds"	Jan Crutchfield	October 3, 1966	2:42
4.	"Get Whatcha Got and Go"	Lynn; Ron Williams; Leona Williams	November 17, 1966	2:00
5.	"Making Plans"	Voni Morrison; Johnny Russell	October 3, 1966	2:00
6.	"I Got Caught"	Lynn	November 17, 1966	2:01

== Personnel ==
Adapted from the album liner notes and Decca recording session records.

- Harold Bradley – electric bass guitar
- Owen Bradley – producer
- David Briggs – piano
- Hal Buksbaum – cover photo
- Fred Carter Jr. – guitar
- Floyd Cramer – piano
- Ray Edenton – acoustic guitar
- Buddy Harman – drums
- Junior Huskey – bass
- The Jordanaires – background vocals
- Loretta Lynn – lead vocals
- Grady Martin – guitar, lead electric guitar
- Johnny Russell – guitar
- Hal Rugg – steel guitar
- Joe Zinkan – bass

== Charts ==
Album

Chart (1967)	Peak position
US Hot Country Albums (Billboard)	1
US Top LP's (Billboard)	80

Singles

Title	Year	Peak position
Title	Year	US Country
"Don't Come Home a Drinkin' (With Lovin' on Your Mind)"	1966	1

== Certifications ==
Region	Certification	Certified units/sales
United States (RIAA)	Gold	500,000^{^}
^{^} Shipments figures based on certification alone.
