= Jay Lee Webb =

American singer-songwriter

Jay Webb
- Born: Willie Lee Webb; February 12, 1937; Butcher Hollow, Kentucky, U.S.
- Died: July 31, 1996 (aged 59) Nashville, Tennessee, U.S.
- Genre: Country
- Occupation: Singer-songwriter
- Instrument: Vocals
- Years active: 1958–1971
- Label: Sun Records
- Spouse(s): Louise Davis (m. 1961; div. 1963) Lou Anne Robinson (m. 1971)

Willie "Jay" Lee Webb (February 12, 1937 – July 31, 1996) was an American country music singer. He is known for his 1967 song, "I Come Home A-Drinkin' (To a Worn-Out Wife Like You)", which was written as an "answer song" to his older sister Loretta Lynn's No. 1 1967 hit "Don't Come Home A Drinkin'".

== Childhood ==
Willie "Jay" Lee Webb was born in a cabin on February 12, 1937, in Butcher Hollow, Kentucky. He was the third son and fourth child born to Clara Marie "Clary" (née Ramey; May 5, 1912 – November 24, 1981) and Melvin Theodore "Ted" Webb (June 6, 1906 – February 22, 1959), a coal miner and subsistence farmer. Webb had seven siblings: Melvin "Junior" Webb (1929–1993), Loretta Lynn (April 14, 1932 – October 4, 2022), Herman Webb (1934–2018), Donald Ray Webb (1941–2017), Peggy Sue (née Webb; born March 25, 1943), Betty Ruth Hopkins (née Webb; born 1946), and Crystal Gayle (born Brenda Gail Webb; January 9, 1951).

=== Early adulthood ===
His mother called him "Jay Lee" from an early age, which he would later use in his career. He learned to play his father's guitar when he left school at 15. He often played and sang along with his father, Ted. Ted Webb died early of black lung disease as a result of years working in the coal mines of Van Lear, Kentucky. A year before his father's death in 1959, Webb left Kentucky and moved to Custer, Washington. He lived with his sister Loretta and her family. He sang in local honky-tonks with his guitar and played in a local performing circuit. Webb, like his sister, wrote his own songs, and he co-wrote some of her later hits.

== Career ==
=== Early career with Sun Records (1958–1960) ===
Webb was a keen guitar player and decided to write some short gospel songs with his sister Loretta. Having a tenor voice, Webb discovered gospel songs were well suited to him. In February 1959, sister Loretta formed her own band. Lynn called her band "The Trailblazers", and Webb played guitar. They performed all over Washington, and Lynn was beginning to build a small fan following.

After Lynn won a contest in Tacoma, Washington, the prize was an invitation to Los Angeles. Webb, however, was not having as much luck. He continued to perform locally in the Pacific Northwest. On June 16, 1960, Webb was noticed by Sun Records producer and engineer Jack Clement, who was on a business trip. Clement invited him to a recording session to record two songs that Webb had penned himself; "Will You Come Home (Any Time Soon)?" and "I'm Waitin' For You". They were recorded on July 20, 1960, in Memphis, Tennessee, and released shortly after on August 5.

The songs failed to garner any attention. Nevertheless, Jay Lee took the contract offer with Sun Records for $120 per week on August 10, 1960. "I'm Waitin' For You" charted at No. 92 on the Billboard Hot Country Singles charts and stalled there. Jay Lee continued to record for the Sun label but was not having much success. He moved to South Memphis in October 1960.

In mid November 1960, Decca offered Webb a recording contract and a chance to record "Just A Little". He declined both the song and the contract. Subsequently, Brenda Lee recorded the song, and the single was released a month later. In the meantime, Webb learned to play the fiddle in two months and began playing and singing with another band in order to make ends meet.

=== Career decline, and home life in Nashville (1961–1965) ===
Webb's contract with Sun Records expired on January 15, 1961. He continued to play his guitar, and co-wrote a few of Lynn's songs but was never credited for it. He also secured a contract with Wilburn Brothers Publishing Company and played on their TV show for $30 per week.

He performed other country music singers' songs like Patsy Montana's smash hit song "I Want to Be a Cowboy's Sweetheart" and Kitty Wells' smash hit "It Wasn't God Who Made Honky Tonk Angels". His sister urged him to move to Nashville, and she secured him a contract with Vocalion Records in Memphis which he signed on April 19, 1961, for $50 per week. Jay Lee recorded one record, however, the label didn't want to record any more material with him. Thus, Webb breached the contract. He was then sued by the record label for $100. Webb went to court and won the case for $200.

Webb continued to perform on the Wilburn Brothers' show as an unnoticed country singer; he was credited as a bubblegum pop singer which he disliked. He noticed that he had a honky-tonk style voice, and went into writing honky-tonk style songs. The contract expired on July 16, 1961. He left Memphis and went to Wabash to his mother and the family and worked as a nightclub entertainer.

In August 1962, he moved to Nashville and played the guitar on many of his sister's records. He is mostly heard in the song "Before I'm Over You". Decca employed him as a guitarist on records, and he played the violin in some of Patsy Cline's records.

As 1963 came, he helped to produce his sister Loretta's first album "Loretta Lynn Sings" and played the guitar for several of her records. Decca fired him on March 3, 1963, and he went back to singing in nightclubs. Webb's brother Herman moved in with him in Nashville in July 1963, and he went to singing in nightclubs like Webb. Webb secured a 2-month contract with Decca to record four songs (and release two singles with B-sides) on August 16, 1963. His sister became more and more notable by the day.

Webb recorded two songs on August 24, 1963: "Lord, Are You Ever Returnin' (Home To Me)", "Your Photo (Is Hauntin' Me)". They were released on November 2, 1963, and "Your Photo (Is Hauntin' Me)" made No. 89 on the Billboard Hot Country Singles, but once again the songs were not a major success. He recorded two more gospel songs on November 15, 1963: "As Long As You Love Me" and "I'll Live (Without You)" and it was released on November 30, 1963. "As Long As You Love Me" made No. 90 on the Billboard Hot Country Singles.

When his Decca contract expired on December 16, 1963, he returned to singing in nightclubs and earning a living off of his guitar & violin. He went to work in a diner for $70 a week, he performed with his guitar and his own compositions. He stayed there until March 1966.

=== Career recuperation and success (1966–1971) ===
In February 1966, Webb wrote "Lay Some Happiness On Me" and sang it to his sister Loretta Lynn. She told him he had a hit on his hands, and that he needed to get a record deal. He wrote more songs, they varied from honky-tonk to unmistakable gospel. He continued to sing in nightclubs, and searching for a record deal to record his songs. Loretta approached Owen Bradley asking him to sign her brother who had a hit song, and Bradley offered him a contract, which Webb accepted and signed on May 18, 1966.

He cut his first single, "Lay Some Happiness On Me" on 27 May and it was released on 3 April 1966. It made No. 61 on the Billboard Hot Country Singles (his best so far). He wrote a few more honky-tonk-style songs, including "Your Squaw Is On The Warpath" which became a famous song for sister Loretta Lynn.

On October 12, 1966, he recorded two songs: "Ribbon of Darkness" (which sister Crystal Gayle later sang) and "Gotta Swim The Mississippi". It became a smash hit for him; "Gotta Swim The Mississippi" charted at No. 32 on the Billboard Hot Country Singles. He became a more in-demand act, and began performing minimum 10 concerts every 2 weeks. Brenda Lee approached him with a song, "Too Little Time", that she had recorded but was not a success (it made No. 123). He accepted it, and recorded it on December 28, 1966, along with "It's A Sin".

He recorded "I Come Home A-Drinkin' (To a Worn-Out Wife Like You)" on March 16, 1967, for his album, I Come Home A Drinkin'. The revised lyrics to Lynn's song were written by Teddy Wilburn. The album was released on June 20, 1967, and it made No. 19 on the Billboard Hot Country Albums. "I Come Home A-Drinkin' (To a Worn-Out Wife Like You)" was released as a single on June 23, 1967, peaking at number 37 on the Billboard Hot Country Singles chart. In total, 8 songs from the album were released on singles (4 singles A & B-Sides). Throughout 1967, he wrote and performed songs but didn't record any of them.

On January 29, 1968, he recorded four songs (three of which were his own compositions): "Bottle, Turn Her Off", "The Happiness Of Havin' You", "Tootsie's Wall" and "Bottle, Here I Come". They both had B-sides, and were released in two singles on February 16, 1968. In early March 1968, he secured a contract with the Wilburn Brothers to perform on their show for $60 per week.

As 1969, he recorded two more songs, a re-record "You Never Were Mine" and "Margie's At The Lincoln Park Inn", two of which he did not write. On August 28, 1969, he released his second album entitled "She's Looking Better by The Minute" which charted at number 13 on the Billboard Hot Country Albums.

In 1970, he was on the road in concerts, performing in nightclubs and making semi-regular appearances on the Wilburn Brothers show. He was still writing songs, but didn't record them. His sister Peggy Sue recorded his composition, "All American Husband", which charted at No. 37.

During 1971, he remained close to his sisters who all lived in the Nashville area. He recorded one more song, "A Whole Lot Of Nothing". On May 28, 1971, Owen Bradley asked him to record another song, "You Are The One" as a duet with wife Lou Anne. Webb and his wife recorded the song, and it was released a B-side single on July 2. On November 28, he recorded "My Favorite Memory" which was released on December 21. He finished his recording contract on December 30, 1971, and didn't return to the recording business.

== Personal life ==
=== First marriage (1961–1963) ===
He met his first wife, Louise Davis, at a banquet in Columbus, Ohio, on April 28, 1961. She moved to Memphis, Tennessee, with him in May, and he moved to his mother's home in Indiana in August of that year. She became pregnant in early June, and they were married on June 20, 1961, at St. Patrick Catholic Church in Memphis. On February 10, 1962, their daughter, Yvonne Clara Webb, was born at Memphis Medical Center in Memphis. She contracted tonsillitis in August 1962, and died on September 2, 1962. She is buried at Elmwood Cemetery in Memphis. In late September 1962, after the death of their daughter, his wife returned to Columbus and he filed for divorce on the grounds of desertion on September 29, 1962. The divorce was finalized on January 11, 1963.

=== Second and final marriage (1971–1996) ===
While performing in Camden, Tennessee, between April 6–8 of 1971, he met his fan Lou Anne Robinson. They began courting, and she moved to Nashville with him. She became pregnant in early May, and they sang a duet on the song "You Are The One" to be his second to last song. She gave birth to a son on January 7, 1972, at Saint Thomas Midtown Hospital in Nashville. After a move in March 1972, Lou Anne became pregnant again with their second child. They moved again to a bigger house outside of Nashville in Hendersonville in July 1972. On November 27, 1972, at Hendersonville Medical Center, their daughter was born. Both children grew up in Hendersonville; their dad became a drugstore owner, and their mother became a secretary.

== Death ==
Webb died on July 31, 1996, at age 59 after battling pancreatic cancer for two years and four months. He had been admitted to Saint Thomas Midtown Hospital in Nashville, where he died with his wife and children by his side. He was buried at Hermitage Memorial Gardens Cemetery (Old Hickory, Tennessee) just outside Nashville on August 15, 1996. His funeral was attended by his wife, children, grandchildren and siblings; his sisters Loretta Lynn and Crystal Gayle gave eulogies at his funeral.
