= Citizens National Bank (Eastern Kentucky) =

Coordinates: 37°48′38″N 82°48′4″W

- Type: Private
- Industry: Retail and commercial banking
- Genre: Banking
- Founded: February 16, 1910
- Headquarters: 620 Broadway Avenue; Paintsville, Kentucky, United States 41240
- Number of locations: 17
- Key people: Dennis Dorton; President, Chief Executive Officer
- Products: commercial and retail banking, mortgage financing and servicing, consumer finance and asset management
- Net income: $2.1 million USD (2010)
- Total assets: $599.5 million USD (2010)
- Total equity: $67.3 million USD (2010)
- Owner: Citizens National Corporation
- Number of employees: 187 (2010)
- Website: cnbonline.com

Citizens National Bank is a bank headquartered in Paintsville, Kentucky, and is the second-largest independently owned bank in Kentucky, with total assets of $599.5 million (as of June 30, 2010). Citizens National Bank is a national bank, regulated by the Office of the Comptroller of the Currency, Department of the Treasury.

It should not be confused with the smaller Citizens National Bank headquartered in Somerset, Kentucky.

== History ==
The original Citizens National Bank location opened on Main Street in Paintsville on February 16, 1910, and was known as Paintsville Bank and Trust Company. In 1917, a new two-story building was constructed to replace the much smaller frame building that was located just down the street. Then on January 3, 1927, the bank became a national bank and was renamed the Second National Bank of Paintsville.

After a few more years, the bank became the principal bank of Paintsville and Johnson County. So on June 30, 1959, to celebrate being the oldest continuously operating and most popular bank in the county, they decided to change the bank's name to Citizens National Bank. One year later on February 15, a new location was opened on the corner of Broadway and Tenth Street. This location was called The Motor Bank Branch because it was the first branch location to have a drive-thru. Then on March 29, 1971, the bank built the Family Banking Center adjacent to the Motor Bank.

Beginning in the late 1970s and early 1980s, Citizens National Bank began to expand rapidly. So to meet the needs of their customers, they opened the Mayo Plaza Branch on November 15, 1978, and the Village Plaza Branch on August 7, 1982. In the latter part of 1982, Citizens National Corporation was created to serve as the holding company of the bank. Then on December 11, 1985, the corporation sold two million dollars in Industrial Revenue Bonds to erect a new main office building next to the Family Banking Center. On January 17, 1988, the new four-story main office building opened and shortly afterwards the no longer needed Motor Bank was torn down.

In the past decade, Citizens National Bank has merged with three other banks: The Bank Josephine, Heritage Bank of Ashland, and Kentucky National Bank. Currently, there are 17 locations in Boyd, Carter, Fayette, Floyd, Greenup, Johnson, Magoffin and Pike Counties in Kentucky.

== Donations ==
- In 2007, the bank donated their former headquarters located at 75 Main Street to the city of Paintsville. The city then converted it into the new city hall.
- In 1984, it donated the old Consolidation Coal Company office at Van Lear to the Van Lear Historical Society. The historical society then transformed it into the Coal Miner's Museum.
- On August 18, 2010, Midway College School of Pharmacy received a $50,000 donation for the construction of the new campus in Paintsville.
