= Singin' Again =

Studio album by Ernest Tubb and Loretta Lynn
- Released: May 29, 1967
- Recorded: December 21, 1966–January 4, 1967
- Studio: Bradley's Barn, Mt. Juliet, Tennessee
- Genre: Country
- Length: 28:45
- Label: Decca
- Producer: Owen Bradley

Ernest Tubb and Loretta Lynn chronology
Mr. and Mrs. Used to Be (1965)	Singin' Again (1967)	If We Put Our Heads Together (1969)

Ernest Tubb chronology
Another Story (1967)	Singin' Again (1967)	Ernest Tubb Sings Hank Williams (1968)

Loretta Lynn chronology
Don't Come Home a Drinkin' (With Lovin' on Your Mind) (1967)	Singin' Again (1967)	Singin' with Feelin' (1967)

Singles from Singin' Again
- 1. "Sweet Thang" Released: January 23, 1967

Singin' Again is the second collaborative studio album by American country music singers Ernest Tubb and Loretta Lynn. It was released on May 29, 1967, by Decca Records.

== Critical reception ==
Professional ratings
Review scores
Source	Rating
AllMusic	2/5 stars

In the issue dated June 17, 1967, Billboard published a review of the album which called the album "A welcome, winning album return for a winning duet, as Loretta Lynn and Ernest Tubb again join forces in a first rate collection, beginning with their hit "Sweet Thang". "Bartender" is a fine collaboration. "We'll Never Change" and "Yearning" are among the 10 other standouts."

Cashbox published a review in the June 10, 1967 issue that said, "Once again Ernest Tubb and Loretta Lynn have combined their great talents, and the result is a powerhouse package that’s sure to make a speed climb up the charts. Included in the set are "Sweet Thang", "Let’s Stop Right Where We Are", "I’m Bitin' My Fingernails and Thinkin' of You", "Yearning", and eight others. Stock as much as you can get of this one."

== Commercial performance ==
The album peaked at No. 2 on the US Billboard Hot Country Albums chart.

The album's only single, "Sweet Thang", was released in January 1967 and peaked at No. 45 on the US Billboard Hot Country Singles chart.

== Recording ==
Recording sessions for the album took place at Columbia Recording Studio in Nashville, Tennessee, on December 21 and 27, 1966. One additional recording session was held on January 4, 1967.

== Track listing ==
Side one
No.	Title	Writer(s)	Recording date	Length
1.	"Sweet Thang"	Nat Stuckey	December 21, 1966	2:32
2.	"We'll Never Change"	John Earl Clift	January 4, 1967	2:06
3.	"Let's Stop Right Where We Are"	Loretta Lynn	December 21, 1966	2:36
4.	"Love Is No Excuse"	Justin Tubb	December 27, 1966	2:50
5.	"I'm Not Leavin' You (It's All in Your Mind)"	Lucille Cosensza; Johnny Tillotson	January 4, 1967	2:56
6.	"Beautiful Unhappy Home"	Johnny Russell; Teddy Wilburn	December 21, 1966	2:15

Side two
No.	Title	Writer(s)	Recording date	Length
1.	"One to Ten"	Mildred Burk	December 27, 1966	2:09
2.	"Bartender"	Lynn; Maggie Vaughn	January 4, 1967	1:56
3.	"I'm Bitin' My Fingernails and Thinking of You"	Ernest Benedict; Lenny Sanders; Ernest Tubb; Red West	December 27, 1966	2:17
4.	"Yearning"	Eddie Eddings; George Jones	December 21, 1966	2:57
5.	"Beautiful Friendship"	Jack Rhodes; Faye Keys; Larry Grounds	January 4, 1967	2:01
6.	"Thin Grey Line"	Betty Sue Perry	December 27, 1966	2:10

== Personnel ==
Adapted from the album liner notes and Decca recording session records.

- Owen Bradley – producer
- Steve Chapman – guitar
- Buddy Charleton – steel guitar
- Jack Drake – bass
- Jack Greene – drums
- Kelso Herston – bass
- Loretta Lynn – lead vocals
- Hargus Robbins – piano
- Cal Smith – guitar
- Ernest Tubb – lead vocals
- Pete Wade – guitar
- Teddy Wilburn – liner notes

== Charts ==
Album

Chart (1967)	Peak position
US Hot Country Albums (Billboard)	2

Singles

Title	Year	Peak position
Title	Year	US Country
"Sweet Thang"	1967	45
