= Back in Baby's Arms =

Studio album by Connie Smith
- Released: October 1969
- Recorded: July 1968 – July 1969
- Studio: RCA Victor Studios
- Genre: Country
- Label: RCA Victor
- Producer: Bob Ferguson

Connie Smith chronology
Young Love (1969)	Back in Baby's Arms (1969)	Sunday Morning with Nat Stuckey and Connie Smith (1970)

Back in Baby's Arms is the thirteenth solo studio album by American country singer Connie Smith, released in October 1969 by RCA Victor. The album contained a mixture of both new recordings and cover versions of previously recorded material. Back in Baby's Arms reached the top 20 of the American country albums chart in 1969 and received a four-star rating from AllMusic.

== Background ==
Connie Smith reached peak success in the mid and late 1960s with the launch of her debut single called "Once a Day". Released in 1964, the song topped the American country chart for eight weeks and brought a series of follow-up singles into the top ten through 1969. In 1968, Smith became a Christian, which affected her both personally and professionally. Yet, Smith continued to record for her label (RCA Victor) with the same output as in previous years. However, Smith made the commitment to incorporate more gospel music into her country studio albums. This trend would be seen on her next studio sessions for the recording of Back in Baby's Arms which included country music material, along with one gospel song.

== Recording and content ==
Smith went into RCA Victor Studios in July 1969 to record the tracks for Back in Baby's Arms. The sessions were produced by her longtime RCA producer Bob Ferguson. One track, "What Would I Do Without You", was pulled from Smith's July 1968 session. The album contained a total of 11 tracks. Many of the album's recordings were covers of both country and pop songs of the era. The title track was a cover of the song originally recorded by Patsy Cline. Smith's was done in an up-tempo "shuffle", according to biographer Barry Mazor. "The Wedding Cake" was originally a charting single for pop artist Connie Francis in 1969. Smith also covered "Long Black Limousine", which had previously been recorded by both Bobby Bare and Elvis Presley. Smith's version was more "deliberate" and "dramatic", according to Mazor. Also included was a cover of Brenda Lee's "Fool #1".

Smith also cut Brenda Lee's "Too Many Rivers", which reached the American pop top 20 in 1965. Per Smith's vow to record more gospel material, a cover of "How Great Thou Art" is also included on the album. In an interview with Mazor, Smith recalled being drawn to the track after hearing it performed by Sonny James. According to Smith, disc jockey Pat Campbell wanted to release her version as a single in Europe, but RCA declined to do so. "Why RCA didn't release my recording, I just don't know," she reflected. Several new tracks were also part of the album project. Among these new tracks was "I Can't Get Used to Being Lonely", which was composed by Melba Montgomery and was among Smith's favorites from the album, according to Mazor. "Now" (written by Cy Coben) was also a new track.

== Release and reception ==
Professional ratings
Review scores
Source	Rating
Allmusic	4.5/5 stars

Back in Baby's Arms was released by the RCA Victor label in October 1969. It became the fourteenth studio album released in Smith's career and her thirteenth solo album (she had previously recorded a duet project with Nat Stuckey). The label issued the disc as a vinyl LP, containing six songs on "side one" and five songs on "side two". Decades later, it was re-released through Sony Music Entertainment to digital and streaming sites including Apple Music. Also in the years that followed, AllMusic's Dan Cooper would rate the album 4.5 out of 5 stars. Cooper only mentioned Smith's cover of "How Great Thou Art" in his review, praising the recording: "If any Thomas ever doubted Smith's religious convictions (which are as much a part of her story as her voice is) one listen to this LP's 'How Great Thou Art' should take care of that mistrust." In its original release, Back in Baby's Arms spent 15 weeks on the American Billboard Country LP's chart, peaking at the number 12 position in December 1969. It was her fifth album to chart in the top 20 rather than the top ten.

== Track listings ==
=== Vinyl version ===
Side one
No.	Title	Writer(s)	Length
1.	"Back in Baby's Arms"	Bob Montgomery	2:10
2.	"Long Black Limousine"	Bobby George; Vern Stovall	3:30
3.	"I Can't Get Used to Being Lonely"	Melba Montgomery	2:43
4.	"Fool #1"	Kathryn R. Fulton	2:26
5.	"Gone Too Far"	Jack Ripley	2:35
6.	"The Wedding Cake"	Margaret Lewis; Mira Smith	2:29

Side two
No.	Title	Writer(s)	Length
1.	"Too Many Rivers"	Harlan Howard	2:59
2.	"How Great Thou Art"	Stuart K. Hine	4:10
3.	"The Call"	Cy Coben	2:45
4.	"Now"	Paul Parnes; Herb Strizik	3:38
5.	"What Would I Do Without You"	Coben	2:14

=== Digital version ===
Back in Baby's Arms (download and streaming)
No.	Title	Writer(s)	Length
1.	"Back in Baby's Arms"	B. Montgomery	2:05
2.	"Long Black Limousine"	George; Stovall	3:30
3.	"I Can't Get Used to Being Lonely"	M. Montgomery	2:51
4.	"Fool #1"	Fulton	2:27
5.	"Gone Too Far"	Ripley	2:38
6.	"The Wedding Cake"	Lewis; Smith	2:30
7.	"Too Many Rivers"	Howard	3:02
8.	"How Great Thou Art"	Hine	4:12
9.	"The Call"	Coben	2:30
10.	"Now"	Parnes; Strizik	3:41
11.	"What Would I Do Without You"	Coben	2:20

== Personnel ==
All credits are adapted from the liner notes of Back in Baby's Arms and the biography booklet by Barry Mazor titled Just for What I Am.

Musical personnel

- Chet Atkins – Guitar
- David Briggs – Piano
- Jerry Carrigan – Drums
- Fred Carter, Jr. – Electric guitar
- Dolores Edgin – Background vocals
- Thomas Glaser – Background vocals
- Roy Huskey – Bass
- Grady Martin – Electric guitar, leader
- Weldon Myrick – Steel guitar
- June Page – Background vocals
- Hargus "Pig" Robbins – Piano
- Billy Sanford – Electric guitar
- Connie Smith – Lead vocals
- Ray Stevens – Organ
- Bill Walker – Vibes, leader
- Hurshel Wiginton – Background vocals
- Chip Young – Rhythm guitar

Technical personnel

- Bob Ferguson – Producer
- Milton Henderson – Technician
- Leslie Ladd – Technician
- Jim W. Scott – Liner notes
- Roy Shockley – Technician
- Bill Vandevort – Engineer

== Chart performance ==
Chart (1969)	Peak position
US Top Country Albums (Billboard)	12

== Release history ==
Region	Date	Format	Label	Ref.
North America	October 1969	Vinyl	RCA Victor Records	
United Kingdom	1972	Vinyl	RCA Victor Records	
North America	2010s	Music download; streaming	Sony Music Entertainment	
