= A Far Cry from You =

Single by Connie Smith
- B-side: "Don't Touch"
- Released: June 1985
- Recorded: April 1985; Nashville, Tennessee, U.S.
- Genre: Country
- Label: Epic
- Songwriter: Steve Earle

Connie Smith singles chronology
"Rough at the Edges" (1983)	"A Far Cry from You" (1985)	"Hold Me Back" (1986)

"A Far Cry from You" is a song written by Steve Earle that was released as a single by American country artist Connie Smith. The song was released as a single on Epic Records and did not appear on an official album. "A Far Cry from You" became Smith's first official single to be issued following her decision to enter semi-retirement in the late 1970s. Secondly, the song became her final single to reach a position on the Billboard country chart.

== Background and content ==
"A Far Cry from You" was written by Steve Earle, originally a songwriter whose career would shift into commercial success as a recording artist. Connie Smith had been in a period of semi-retirement from the music industry since 1979. Country artist Ricky Skaggs convinced Smith to return to music again, prompting the recording of Earle's song after signing with Epic Records. Additionally, her youngest daughter was beginning kindergarten, allowing Smith more time to devote to other activities. "A Far Cry from You" was recorded in April 1985 in Nashville, Tennessee, United States. The song was cut under Smith's first session as a member of the Epic Records roster. The second track recorded at this session was "Don't Touch", which would serve as the single's official B-side.

Since its initial launch, "A Far Cry from You" has received positive critical response. No Depression praised the song, commenting in 1998, "The record barely dented the charts, but it's noteworthy for being the closest Smith's music has ever come to bluegrass, and for being penned by a then-up-and-coming Nashville songwriter named Steve Earle."

== Chart performance and release ==
"A Far Cry from You" was released in June 1985 as a 7" vinyl single on Epic Records. The single reached a minor chart position that year, peaking at number 71 on the Billboard Hot Country Singles and Tracks chart. It has since been Smith's final single to reach a Billboard chart position to date. Additionally, the song did not appear on an official album.

The song represented a temporary resurgence in Smith's recording career, after a six-year hiatus. Robert K. Oermann and A. Mary Bufwakck of Finding Her Voice: The History of Women in Country Music explained Smith's choice of leaving and re-entering the music business, "I have never regretted that decision. I was sick and tired of it all. There just wasn't enough of me to go around. I nursed all three of my girls on the road. I couldn't keep doing what I was doing in church and with my family and the career. I couldn't afford someone to clean my house and do all that stuff. So the only thing I could give up was the singing. And I never really thought I'd go back to it." Following the release of a second single in 1986, Smith went into semi-retirement again. She officially returned to recording and performing in 1998 with the release of her self-titled studio album.

== Track listings ==
7" vinyl single

- "A Far Cry from You"
- "Don't Touch"

== Charts ==
=== Weekly charts ===
Chart (1985)	Peak position
US Hot Country Singles and Tracks (Billboard)	71
