= Singin' with Feelin' =

Studio album by Loretta Lynn
- Released: October 9, 1967
- Recorded: July 16, 1966–April 20, 1967
- Studio: Bradley's Barn, Mount Juliet, Tennessee
- Genre: Country
- Length: 29:03
- Label: Decca
- Producer: Owen Bradley

Loretta Lynn chronology
Singin' Again (1967)	Singin' with Feelin' (1967)	Who Says God Is Dead! (1968)

Singles from Singin' with Feelin'
- 1. "If You're Not Gone Too Long" Released: April 17, 1967

Singin' with Feelin' is the tenth solo studio album by American country music singer-songwriter Loretta Lynn. It was released on October 9, 1967, by Decca Records.

== Critical reception ==
Professional ratings
Review scores
Source	Rating
AllMusic	4/5 stars

Billboard published a review in the issue dated October 28, 1967, which said, "Three extremely well-performed tunes are on this album—but one is so far above the rest that it glows. It's solid, traditional in aspect, soulful in delivery—"I'll Sure Come a Long Way Down". Her other two outstanding songs are pop in nature, "Dark Moon" and "Secret Love", though "Dark Moon" is a country-originated effort."

The review published in the October 21, 1967 issue of Cashbox said, "Hordes and hordes of country fans have massed to secure for Loretta Lynn the position of No. 1 female vocalist, a role which she has enjoyed for several years now, and which she shows little signs of relinquishing. One of the reasons for her immense popularity has been the sincerity and feeling which flavor her vocal efforts, and this LP contains a generous sampling of that feeling, with standout tracks in "Dark Moon", "A Place to Hide And Cry", and her recent smash single, "If You’re Not Gone Too Long"."

== Commercial performance ==
The album peaked at No. 3 on the US Billboard Hot Country Albums chart.

The album's only single, "If You're Not Gone Too Long", was released in April 1967 and peaked at No. 7 on the US Billboard Hot Country Singles chart.

== Recording ==
Recording sessions for the album took place at Bradley's Barn studio in Mount Juliet, Tennessee, beginning on January 18, 1967. Two additional sessions followed on April 19 and 20, 1967. Two songs on the album were recorded during the sessions for 1967's Don't Come Home a Drinkin' (With Lovin' on Your Mind). "A Place to Hide and Cry" was recorded on July 16, 1966, and "If Loneliness Don't Kill Me" was recorded on October 5.

== Track listing ==
Side one
No.	Title	Writer(s)	Recording date	Length
1.	"Bargain Basement Dress"	Loretta Lynn	April 19, 1967	1:45
2.	"Dark Moon"	Ned Miller	April 19, 1967	2:44
3.	"If Loneliness Don't Kill Me"	Bill Henson	October 5, 1966	2:25
4.	"It's Such a Pretty World Today"	Dale Noe	April 19, 1967	2:10
5.	"Wanted Woman"	Teddy Wilburn	October 5, 1966	2:57
6.	"Slowly Killing Me"	Lynn	April 20, 1967	2:24

Side two
No.	Title	Writer(s)	Recording date	Length
1.	"Secret Love"	Sammy Fain; Paul Francis Webster	April 20, 1967	2:47
2.	"I'll Sure Come a Long Way Down"	Lynn; Maggie Vaughn	January 18, 1967	2:24
3.	"Walk Through This World with Me"	Kay Savage; Sandra Seamons	April 19, 1967	2:24
4.	"If You're Not Gone Too Long"	Wanda Ballman	January 18, 1967	2:36
5.	"What Now?"	Jackie L. Hobbs; Frank B. Jones	January 18, 1967	2:15
6.	"A Place to Hide and Cry"	Doyle Wilburn	July 16, 1966	2:12

== Personnel ==
Adapted from the Decca recording session records.

- Harold Bradley – electric bass guitar
- Owen Bradley – producer
- Floyd Cramer – piano
- Ray Edenton – acoustic guitar
- Buddy Harman – drums
- Junior Huskey – bass
- The Jordanaires – background vocals
- Loretta Lynn – lead vocals
- Grady Martin – lead electric guitar
- Hal Rugg – steel guitar
- Joe Zinkan – bass

== Charts ==
Album

Chart (1967)	Peak position
US Hot Country Albums (Billboard)	3

Singles

Title	Year	Peak position
Title	Year	US Country
"If You're Not Gone Too Long"	1967	7
