= You Ain't Woman Enough (To Take My Man) =

Single by Loretta Lynn

from the album You Ain't Woman Enough
- B-side: "God Gave Me a Heart to Forgive"
- Released: May 1966
- Recorded: 15 November 1965
- Studio: Columbia, Nashville, Tennessee
- Genre: Honky tonk country
- Length: 2:11
- Label: Decca
- Songwriter(s): Loretta Lynn
- Producer(s): Owen Bradley

Loretta Lynn singles chronology
"Dear Uncle Sam" (1966)	"You Ain't Woman Enough (To Take My Man)" (1966)	"Don't Come Home A' Drinkin (With Lovin' on Your Mind)" (1966)

"You Ain't Woman Enough (To Take My Man)" is a song written and originally recorded by American country artist Loretta Lynn. It was released as a single in May 1966 via Decca Records. The song has since been regarded as one of Lynn's signature songs.

== Background and reception ==
"You Ain't Woman Enough (To Take My Man)" was recorded at the Columbia Recording Studio in Nashville, Tennessee on November 15, 1965. The session was produced by the studio's co-founder, renowned country music producer Owen Bradley. Three additional tracks were recorded during this session, including the single's B-side, "God Gave Me a Heart to Forgive" and Lynn's hit single "Dear Uncle Sam".

"You Ain't Woman Enough (To Take My Man)" was based on a real life woman Lynn had met backstage before a concert. In 2016, Lynn recounted that the woman confided in Lynn about how another woman attempted to steal her husband from her. In response to her words, Lynn replied, "Honey, she ain't woman enough to take your man!" Following the conversation, Lynn went into her dressing room and wrote the song.

"You Ain't Woman Enough (To Take My Man)" reached number two on the Billboard Hot Country Singles survey in 1966. The song became her eighth top ten single on the country chart and her biggest hit up to that point. It was included on her 1966 studio album, You Ain't Woman Enough.

== Later versions ==
The song was performed by the Grateful Dead several times in 1973. Sung by female vocalist of the band, Donna Jean Godchaux, it was never played over its original play length and was kept from becoming one of their extended jams. Martina McBride covered the song for her album Timeless. The song has proved popular with southern soul artists with June Edwards (1968), Gloria Edwards (1978) and Tina Turner (1979) recording three well known versions. A comedic version of the song was recorded for the 2005 film Be Cool by Dwayne Johnson, with the full music video viewable on the DVD extras and YouTube. Hayley Williams, lead singer of rock band Paramore, has regularly performed the song while on tour; in 2010, Paramore recorded the song for the tribute album Coal Miner's Daughter: A Tribute to Loretta Lynn. Also in 2010, Lisa McHugh recorded the song for her album Old Fashioned Girl.

Lynn re-recorded the song as a duet with Tanya Tucker for her final studio album Still Woman Enough, released in 2021.

Country music singer Faith Hill covered the song from the television special George Strait: ACM Artist of the Decade All Star Concert.

== Track listings ==
7" vinyl single

- "You Ain't Woman Enough (To Take My Man)" – 2:11
- "God Gave Me a Heart to Forgive" – 2:54

== Charts ==
=== Weekly charts ===
Chart (1966)	Peak position
US Hot Country Singles (Billboard)	2
