= Country Christmas (Loretta Lynn album) =

Studio album by Loretta Lynn
- Released: October 17, 1966
- Recorded: July 7–15, 1966
- Studio: Bradley's Barn, Mount Juliet, Tennessee
- Genre: Country
- Length: 26:39
- Label: Decca
- Producer: Owen Bradley

Loretta Lynn chronology
You Ain't Woman Enough (1966)	Country Christmas (1966)	Don't Come Home a Drinkin' (With Lovin' on Your Mind) (1967)

Singles from Country Christmas
- 1. "To Heck with Ole Santa Claus" Released: November 1966

Country Christmas is the eighth solo studio album and first Christmas album by American country music singer-songwriter Loretta Lynn. It was released on October 17, 1966 by Decca Records. Lynn would not release another Christmas album until 2016's White Christmas Blue, 50 years later.

The album includes four original compositions by Lynn, along with popular holiday songs, including "Santa Claus Is Coming to Town", "White Christmas", and "Frosty the Snowman".

In 2005, MCA Records reissued the album on CD as a part of their 20th Century Masters series, under the title The Christmas Collection: The Best of Loretta Lynn, with modified cover art.

== Critical reception ==
Professional ratings
Review scores
Source	Rating
AllMusic	3/5 stars

In the issue dated October 29, 1966, Billboard published a review of the album, which said, "The album's beautiful songs include "Country Christmas", "Away in a Manger" — all great programming material for country music stations, and this will create high sales. The "Manger" tune deserves a single. Possibly her best effort to date."

== Commercial performance ==
The album did not appear on any music charts.

The only single, "To Heck with Ole Santa Claus", was released in November 1966 and did not chart.

== Recording ==
Recording sessions for the album took place on July 7, 13, and 15, 1966, at Bradley's Barn in Mount Juliet, Tennessee.

== Track listing ==
Side one
No.	Title	Writer(s)	Recording date	Length
1.	"Country Christmas"	Loretta Lynn	July 7, 1966	2:06
2.	"Away in a Manger"	Traditional	July 15, 1966	2:20
3.	"Santa Claus Is Coming to Town"	J. Fred Coots; Haven Gillespie	July 7, 1966	2:08
4.	"Silver Bells"	Ray Evans; Jay Livingston	July 7, 1966	2:00
5.	"Blue Christmas"	Billy Hayes; Jay W. Johnson	July 15, 1966	2:27
6.	"It Won't Seem Like Christmas"	Lynn	July 7, 1966	2:09

Side two
No.	Title	Writer(s)	Recording date	Length
1.	"To Heck with Ole Santa Claus"	Lynn	July 13, 1966	2:01
2.	"White Christmas"	Irving Berlin	July 13, 1966	2:02
3.	"Frosty the Snowman"	Steve Nelson; Walter E. Rollins	July 13, 1966	2:58
4.	"Christmas Without Daddy"	Jackie Webb	July 13, 1966	2:07
5.	"I Won't Decorate Your Christmas Tree"	Bob Cummings; Barbara Cummings; Lynn	July 15, 1966	2:05
6.	"Gift of the Blues"	Hank Cochran	July 15, 1966	2:19

== Personnel ==
Adapted from the Decca recording session records.

- Harold Bradley – electric bass guitar
- Owen Bradley – producer
- Fred Carter Jr. – guitar, electric guitar
- Jon Corneal – drums
- Floyd Cramer – piano
- Buddy Harman – drums
- Junior Huskey – bass
- The Jordanaires – background vocals
- Loretta Lynn – lead vocals
- Grady Martin – guitar, lead electric guitar
- Hal Rugg – steel guitar
