= Hymns (Loretta Lynn album) =

Studio album by Loretta Lynn
- Released: November 15, 1965
- Recorded: June 3–8, 1965
- Studio: RCA Victor, Nashville, Tennessee
- Genre: Gospel; country
- Length: 31:55
- Label: Decca
- Producer: Owen Bradley

Loretta Lynn chronology
Mr. and Mrs. Used to Be (1965)	Hymns (1965)	I Like 'Em Country (1966)

Singles from Hymns
- 1. "Everybody Wants to Go to Heaven" Released: November 29, 1965

Hymns is the fifth solo studio album and first Gospel album by American country music singer-songwriter Loretta Lynn. It was released on November 15, 1965, by Decca Records.

The album consists of 12 gospel and inspirational songs that were either popular over the years or were written by Lynn for this album. Well known Christian songs such as "How Great Thou Art" and "In the Sweet By and By" appear on the album.

== Critical reception ==
Professional ratings
Review scores
Source	Rating
Allmusic	4/5 stars

In the issue dated November 27, 1965, Billboard published a review of the album, saying that "Loretta Lynn proves once again that whatever she does, she does to perfection and that's exactly what this glorious program of heartfelt performances contains. "Where No One Stands Alone" and "Peace in the Valley" are two exceptional examples of the feel and tenderness she has for this all too important music. Destined for a high spot on the LP chart.

== Commercial performance ==
The album debuted at No. 16 on the US Billboard Hot Country Albums chart dated January 22, 1966. It peaked at No. 10 on the chart dated February 12. The album spent a total of 17 weeks on the chart.

The album's only single, "Everybody Want to Go to Heaven", was released in November 1965 and did not chart.

== Recording ==
Recording of the album took place on June 3, 7 and 8, 1965, at RCA Victor Studio in Nashville, Tennessee.

== Track listing ==
Side one
No.	Title	Writer(s)	Recording date	Length
1.	"Everybody Wants to Go to Heaven"	Loretta Lynn	June 8, 1965	2:20
2.	"Where No One Stands Alone"	Mosie Lister	June 3, 1965	2:45
3.	"When They Ring Those Golden Bells"	Traditional	June 7, 1965	3:07
4.	"(There'll Be) Peace in the Valley (For Me)"	Thomas A. Dorsey	June 3, 1965	2:53
5.	"If I Could Hear My Mother Pray Again"	John Whitfield "Whit" Vaughan	June 8, 1965	2:16
6.	"The Third Man"	Don Helms; Teddy Wilburn	June 8, 1965	3:17

Side two
No.	Title	Writer(s)	Recording date	Length
1.	"How Great Thou Art"	Stuart K. Hine	June 3, 1965	2:55
2.	"Old Camp Meetin' Time"	Traditional	June 7, 1965	2:04
3.	"When I Hear My Children Pray" (feat. Ernest Ray Lynn)	Les Waldrop	June 7, 1965	2:34
4.	"In the Sweet By and By"	Joseph Philbrick Webster; Sanford Fillmore Bennett	June 8, 1965	2:22
5.	"Where I Learned to Pray"	Lynn	June 8, 1965	2:44
6.	"I'd Rather Have Jesus"	Traditional	June 3, 1965	2:38

== Personnel ==
Adapted from the album liner notes and Decca recording session records.

- Mae Boren Axton – liner notes
- Harold Bradley – guitar
- Owen Bradley – producer
- Floyd Cramer – piano
- Buddy Harman – drums
- Don Helms – steel guitar
- Junior Huskey – bass
- Loretta Lynn – lead vocals
- Grady Martin – guitar
- Wayne Moss – guitar

== Charts ==
Chart (1966)	Peak position
US Hot Country Albums (Billboard)	10
