= Don't Come Home A-Drinkin' (With Lovin' on Your Mind) =

Single by Loretta Lynn

from the album Don't Come Home A-Drinkin' (With Lovin' on Your Mind)
- B-side: "Saint to a Sinner"
- Released: November 1966
- Recorded: 5 October 1966
- Studio: Bradley's Barn, Mount Juliet, Tennessee
- Genre: Country
- Length: 2:09
- Label: Decca 32900
- Songwriters: Loretta Lynn, Peggy Sue Wright
- Producer: Owen Bradley

Loretta Lynn singles chronology
"You Ain't Woman Enough (To Take My Man)" (1966)	"Don't Come Home A-Drinkin' (With Lovin' on Your Mind)" (1966)	"Sweet Thang" (1967)

"Don't Come Home A-Drinkin' (With Lovin' on Your Mind)" is a country music song, made famous by singer Loretta Lynn in early 1967. The song was Lynn's first number-one country hit. It is one of her best known songs and was included in all of her live shows. It was only the seventh solo female vocalist record to hit that position up to that time (the others being by Goldie Hill, Connie Smith, and two each by Kitty Wells and Patsy Cline) as well as the first written by the woman herself (the song being co-written by Lynn and her sister Peggy Sue). The background vocalists on the recording are the Jordanaires.

== About the song ==
One of Loretta Lynn's best-known compositions, "Don't Come Home A-Drinkin" is about an angry wife who is fed up with her husband coming home late every night very drunk and wanting to have sex. The song was initially written by her younger sister Peggy Sue who later contacted Loretta and both had finished the song, the lyrics are inspired by both women’s husbands; Peggy Sue and Loretta’s husband’s were known to have been heavy drinkers. The song was the first of many controversial songs sung by Lynn, which also included 1972's "Rated X" and 1975's "The Pill". The song was considered very controversial for the time, but was ultimately quite popular. An album of the same name was released following the song's success, which also rose to the top of the charts.

Released in late 1966, "Don't Come Home A-Drinkin'" didn't reach the top spot until February 11, 1967, overtaking Jack Greene's No. 1 hit from late 1966, "There Goes My Everything". The song was the first of 16 No. 1 Country hits Lynn would have over the course of her career. The song set the standard for Lynn's biggest success to come in the early 1970s. Thanks in part to the success of this hit, Lynn became the first female Country entertainer to win the CMA Awards' "Female Vocalist of the Year" award in late 1967.

In 1970 "Don't Come Home A-Drinkin" was certified by the RIAA as a gold album making Loretta Lynn the first woman in country music to receive such an honor.

In 2003, "Don't Come Home A-Drinkin'" placed at No. 47 on CMT's 100 Greatest Songs in Country Music.

In 2024, Rolling Stone ranked the song at #38 on its 200 Greatest Country Songs of All Time ranking.

== Chart performance ==
Chart (1966–1967)	Peak position
U.S. Billboard Hot Country Singles	1

Chart (1974)	Peak position
Australia (Kent Music Report)	54

== Cover versions ==
- One year later, following Lynn's success with the song, Lynn's brother, Jay Lee Webb recorded an answer song to "Don't Come Home A-Drinkin'" titled, "I Come Home A-Drinkin' (To a Worn Out Wife Like You)". Her brother's version of the song charted the country charts that year.
- Tammy Wynette recorded a version for her late 60s album, Your Good Girl's Gonna Go Bad.
- Gretchen Wilson recorded a version as part of the album Coal Miner's Daughter: A Tribute to Loretta Lynn.
- Jason Ringenberg recorded a version with BR549 as part of the album All Over Creation.

== Legacy ==
The song is featured in 2026's Grand Theft Auto VI on their Back Country Radio station in game.
