= Hoot Hester =

American musician (1951–2016)

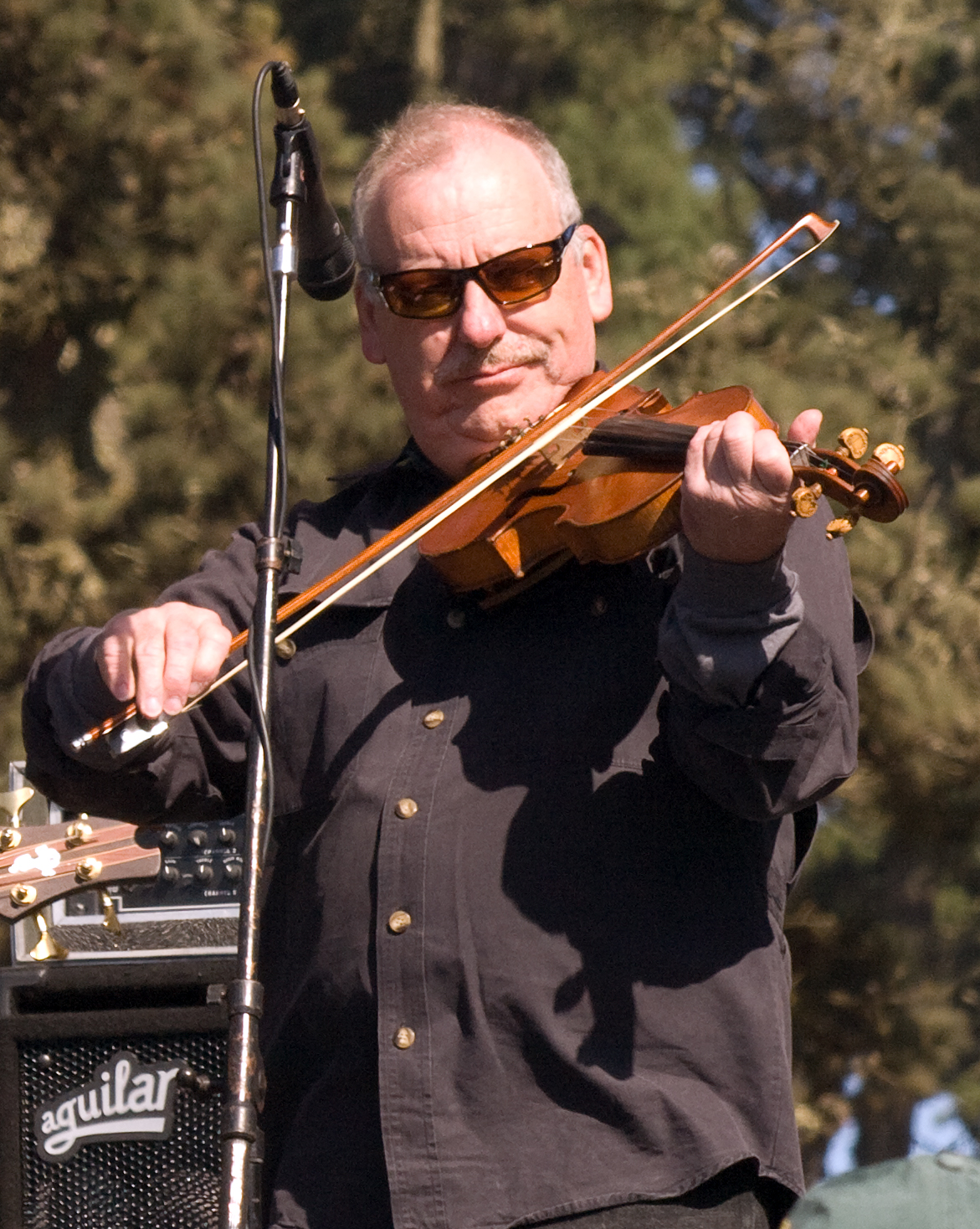
Hoot Hester

Hubert Dwane "Hoot" Hester (August 13, 1951 – August 30, 2016) was an American fiddle player, multi-instrumentalist, and country music and bluegrass artist. He was born on a small farm near Louisville, Kentucky, on August 13, 1951. Hester played with a number of well-known bands, and later became a session musician and a longtime member of the Grand Ole Opry's staff band. Hester was also a featured performer at the NAMM Show during the time it was held in Nashville c. 1993 and 2004.

== Career ==
Hester had played backup for a number of country music recording artists, among them Alabama, Hank Williams Jr., Mel Tillis, Conway Twitty, Randy Travis, Bill Monroe, Vern Gosdin, and Ricky Van Shelton. He had also recorded with Manhattan Transfer and Ray Charles. Hester was the former fiddler and founder of a Nashville-based Western swing band, named the Time Jumpers. He appears on the band's debut album, On the Air. For many years Hester was a fiddle player for the Grand Ole Opry's staff band.

== Beginnings ==
Hester attended Louisville's Southern High School. He began his fiddling career with the Bluegrass Alliance in Louisville. In 1973 he moved to Nashville, having received several job offers after winning fifth place in a fiddle contest at which Chet Atkins and other prominent people in the music industry were judges. For the next year he played with The Whites.

== From the 1980s onward ==
During the 1980s Hester began doing session recording for various artists and producers, and has continued this work until his death. He also began appearing on television shows, one of which played for eleven years. In 1997 Dennis Crouch and Hester put together a western swing band called The Time Jumpers. Hoot eventually left The Time Jumpers to produce and write with Rachael Hester, his youngest daughter, who leads a band named "Rachael Hester and The Tennessee Walkers". Hoot played with the Grand Ole Opry staff band from 2000 until his death. He has also worked with Earl Scruggs until Scruggs' death in March 2012.

== Death ==
Hester died on August 30, 2016, after battling cancer. He was 65.

== See also ==
- The Time Jumpers
