= The Home You're Tearin' Down =

Single by Loretta Lynn

from the album I Like 'Em Country
- B-side: "Farther to Go"
- Released: August 1965
- Recorded: 4 March 1964
- Studio: Columbia (Nashville, Tennessee)
- Genre: Honky tonk country
- Length: 2:44
- Label: Decca
- Songwriter(s): Betty Sue Perry
- Producer(s): Owen Bradley

Loretta Lynn singles chronology
"Our Hearts Are Holding Hands" (1965)	"The Home You're Tearin' Down" (1965)	"When I Hear My Children Pray" (1965)

"The Home You're Tearin' Down" is a song written by Betty Sue Perry that was originally recorded by American country artist Loretta Lynn. It was released as a single in August 1965 via Decca Records.

== Background and reception ==
"The Home You're Tearin' Down" was recorded at the Columbia Recording Studio in Nashville, Tennessee on March 4, 1965. The recording session was produced by the studio's co-founder, renowned country music producer Owen Bradley. Three additional tracks were recorded during this session, including the single's B-side, "Farther to Go".

"The Home You're Tearin' Down" reached number ten on the Billboard Hot Country Singles survey in 1965. The song became her fourth top ten single under the Decca recording label. "The Home You're Tearin' Down" was also the fourth song Lynn recorded that was composed by Betty Sue Perry. It was included on her studio album, I Like 'Em Country (1966).

== Track listings ==
7" vinyl single

- "The Home You're Tearin' Down" – 2:44
- "Farther to Go" – 2:24

== Charts ==
=== Weekly charts ===
Chart (1965)	Peak position
US Hot Country Singles (Billboard)	10
