= Coal Miner's Daughter: A Tribute to Loretta Lynn =

Compilation album by Various Artists
- Released: November 9, 2010
- Genre: Country
- Length: 35:18
- Label: Columbia
- Producers: Mark Bright; Buddy Cannon; John Carter Cash; Blake Chancey; Steve Earle; Byron Gallimore; Chad Howat; Eric Liljestrand; Patsy Lynn; Buddy Miller; Tom Overby; Robert J. Ritchie; Keith Stegall; Jack White; Gretchen Wilson

Singles from Coal Miner's Daughter: A Tribute to Loretta Lynn
- 1. "Coal Miner's Daughter" Released: October 4, 2010

Coal Miner's Daughter: A Tribute to Loretta Lynn is a tribute album compiled by various music artists that is dedicated to country music icon Loretta Lynn. It was released in the United States on November 9, 2010 through Columbia Records. The release celebrates Lynn's 50th anniversary in the music industry.

The album features cover songs from Lynn's back catalogue by various artists, including a duet on "Louisiana Woman, Mississippi Man" by Alan Jackson and Martina McBride, and Gretchen Wilson's cover of "Don't Come Home A' Drinkin' (With Lovin' on Your Mind)." Non-country artists on the release include the rock band Paramore who covered "You Ain't Woman Enough (To Take My Man)," and Kid Rock who covered "I Know How."

== Reception ==
=== Critical ===
Professional ratings
Review scores
Source	Rating
Allmusic	3/5 stars
American Songwriter	4/5 stars
The Boston Globe	()
Country Weekly	4/5 stars
Entertainment Weekly	B+
Los Angeles Times	3.5/5 stars
Paste Magazine	(7.0)
Rolling Stone	3.5/5 stars
Roughstock	4/5 stars

The album debuted at number 14 on the Billboard Top Country albums chart and #46 on the Billboard Top 200 Albums chart selling 24,000 copies in the first week.

Upon its release, Coal Miner's Daughter: A Tribute to Loretta Lynn received generally positive reviews from most music critics. At Metacritic, which assigns a normalized rating out of 100 to reviews from mainstream critics, the album received an average score of 74, based on 8 reviews, which indicates "generally favorable reviews".

Rick Moore with American Songwriter gave the release a 4 star rating, saying "Though not every performance sets the house on fire, everybody’s heart is in the right place", and called Reba McEntire and The Time Jumpers's rendition of "If You’re not Gone Too Long", "the musical high point of the album". James Reed with The Boston Globe gave it a mixed review, saying "too many of the musicians pay their respects without adding anything interesting to the songs" but was also in high praise of Reba McEntire and The Time Jumpers's rendition of "If You’re Not Gone Too Long".

Jody Rosen with Rolling Stone gave it a 3½ rating, saying it had "a steely spine" and largely criticized Kid Rock's rendition of "I Know How", saying "He doesn't know how (to sing this song), but his heart's in the right place". Jessica Phillips with Country Weekly gave it a 4 star rating, noting Lee Ann Womack’s, Gretchen Wilson's and Carrie Underwood's cover on the record. Dan MacIntosh with Roughstock also gave the release a 4 star rating, praising Carrie Underwood's performance, calling it "one of the best, straight country performances we’ve heard all year long". Sony Music released "Coal Miner's Daughter" as recorded with Sheryl Crow and Miranda Lambert as a single and video. When the single charted on the Billboard singles chart it made Lynn the first female country recording artist to chart singles in six decades. The video was a top ten hit as voted by the fans on the GAC Top Twenty Video Countdown Show. Lynn, Crow and Lambert we're also nominated for a Country Music association, Academy of Country Music and CMT Video awards for this release. On the GAC Top 50 Videos of 2011 the video ranked #32. On the 2010 CMA Awards Loretta Lynn was honored for her 50-year career and the three women performed "Coal Miner's Daughter" on the awards telecast.

== Track listing ==
No.	Title	Writer(s)	Artist(s)	Length
1.	"Don't Come Home A' Drinkin' (With Lovin' on Your Mind)"	Loretta Lynn	Gretchen Wilson	2:12
2.	"I'm a Honky Tonk Girl"	Lynn	Lee Ann Womack	2:50
3.	"Rated 'X'"	Lynn	The White Stripes	2:50
4.	"You're Lookin' at Country"	Lynn	Carrie Underwood	2:56
5.	"Louisiana Woman, Mississippi Man"	Becki Bluefield, Jim Owen	Alan Jackson and Martina McBride	3:01
6.	"You Ain't Woman Enough (To Take My Man)"	Lynn	Paramore	2:15
7.	"Love Is the Foundation"	William Cody Hall	Faith Hill	2:38
8.	"After the Fire Is Gone"	L.E. White	Steve Earle and Allison Moorer	2:52
9.	"If You're Not Gone Too Long"	Wanda Ballman	Reba McEntire featuring The Time Jumpers	3:22
10.	"I Know How"	Lynn	Kid Rock	4:03
11.	"Somebody Somewhere (Don't Know What He's Missin' Tonight)"	Lola Jean Dillon	Lucinda Williams	3:08
12.	"Coal Miner's Daughter"	Lynn	Loretta Lynn, Sheryl Crow and Miranda Lambert	3:11

== Chart performance ==
Chart (2010)	Peak position
US Billboard 200	46
US Billboard Top Country Albums	14
