= For the Good Times: A Tribute to Ray Price =

Studio album by Willie Nelson
- Released: September 16, 2016
- Studio: Ocean Way, Hollywood
- Genre: Country
- Length: 40:25
- Label: Legacy Recordings
- Producer: Fred Foster

Willie Nelson chronology
Summertime: Willie Nelson Sings Gershwin (2016)	For the Good Times: A Tribute to Ray Price (2016)	God's Problem Child (2017)

Professional ratings
Review scores
Source	Rating
AllMusic	4/5 stars
PopMatters	7/10
Rolling Stone Germany	3.5/5 stars

For the Good Times: A Tribute to Ray Price is the 65th solo studio album by country music singer-songwriter Willie Nelson, released on September 19, 2016. The album features cover versions of songs recorded by Ray Price, who had died in 2013. Nelson, a former member of Price's Cherokee Cowboys and friend, recorded the twelve-track album at Ocean Way Studios, where Price had recorded his final album, Beauty Is. Engineered by Fred Foster and Bergen White, the album features Vince Gill on six tracks. The content spans Honky Tonk and Countrypolitan.

== Commercial performance ==
The album debuted at No. 5 on the Billboard's Top Country Albums chart, and No. 84 on Billboard 200, selling 7,000 copies in its first week. The second week it sold 2,600 copies.

== Track listing ==
No.	Title	Writer(s)	Length
1.	"Heartaches by the Number" (featuring The Time Jumpers)	Harlan Howard	3:05
2.	"I'll Be There (If You Ever Want Me)" (featuring the Time Jumpers)	Rusty Gabbard, Ray Price	2:10
3.	"Faded Love"	Bob Wills, Johnny Lee Wills	5:24
4.	"It Always Will Be"	Willie Nelson	3:34
5.	"City Lights" (featuring the Time Jumpers)	Bill Anderson	2:57
6.	"Don’t You Ever Get Tired of Hurting Me" (featuring the Time Jumpers)	Hank Cochran	2:34
7.	"Make the World Go Away"	Hank Cochran	3:03
8.	"I'm Still Not Over You"	Willie Nelson	4:31
9.	"Night Life"	Walt Breeland, Paul Buslirk, Willie Nelson	3:19
10.	"Crazy Arms" (featuring the Time Jumpers)	Ralph Mooney, Charles Seals	2:44
11.	"Invitation to the Blues" (featuring the Time Jumpers)	Roger Miller	2:47
12.	"For the Good Times"	Kris Kristofferson	4:17

== Personnel ==
- Brad Albin – upright bass
- Eddie Bayers – drums
- James Button – oboe
- Ellen Dockery – background vocals
- Larry Franklin – fiddle
- Paul Franklin – pedal steel guitar
- Steve Gibson – electric guitar
- Vince Gill – acoustic guitar, electric guitar, background vocals
- Carl Gorodetzky – string arrangements
- John Hobbs – piano
- Jim Horn – flute, saxophone
- Jon Mark Ivey – background vocals
- Jack Jezzro – bass guitar
- Jordan Lehning – background vocals
- Shane McConnell – background vocals
- Charlie McCoy – vibraphone
- The Nashville String Machine – strings
- Willie Nelson – lead vocals, acoustic guitar
- Larry Paxton – bass guitar
- Mickey Raphael – harmonica
- Andy Reiss – electric guitar
- Kenny Sears – fiddle
- Lisa Silver – background vocals
- Kira Small – background vocals
- Joe Spivey – fiddle
- Jeff Taylor – accordion, piano
- Billy Thomas – drums
- Bergen White – conductor, background vocals
- John Willis – acoustic guitar

== Charts ==
Chart (2016)	Peak position
Australian Albums (ARIA)	128
Belgian Albums (Ultratop Flanders)	182
US Billboard 200	84
US Top Country Albums (Billboard)	5
