= Young Love (Connie Smith and Nat Stuckey album) =

Studio album by Connie Smith and Nat Stuckey
- Released: July 1969
- Recorded: April 2 – 30, 1969
- Studio: RCA Studios
- Genre: Country
- Label: RCA Victor
- Producer: Bob Ferguson; Felton Jarvis

Connie Smith chronology
Connie's Country (1969)	Young Love (1969)	Back in Baby's Arms (1969)

Nat Stuckey chronology
Keep 'Em Country (1969)	Young Love (1969)	New Country Roads (1969)

Singles from Young Love
- 1. "Young Love" Released: June 1969

Young Love is a collaborative studio album by American country artists Connie Smith and Nat Stuckey, released in July 1969 by RCA Victor. The project was a collection of duets between Smith and Stuckey. The duets were mostly cover versions of songs previously recorded by other country artists. Many of these songs had originally been released as duets themselves. Included on the project was the pair's cover of "Young Love", which became a top 20 single on the American country songs chart. In 1969, Billboard gave the album a favorable response.

== Background ==
In 1964, Connie Smith's debut single titled "Once a Day" topped the American country songs chart for eight weeks. It set forth a series of uninterrupted top ten country singles during the decade. In 1966, Nat Stuckey's single titled "Sweet Thang" reached the top five of the American country chart and had several more hit singles with "Plastic Saddle" and "Sweet Thang and Cisco". The decision to pair both country artists' voices was by their producers at RCA Victor. Smith's producer (Bob Ferguson) and Stuckey's producer (Felton Jarvis) believed "that their voices would blend well", according to biographer Barry Mazor. Smith herself described the duet pairing as "a four-way deal" because all four people were choosing material.

== Recording and content ==
The recording process for Young Love took place over four different studio sessions between April 2 and April 30, 1969. Three songs were recorded per session and all were cut as duets between Smith and Stuckey. The sessions were co-produced by Bob Ferguson and Felton Jarvis at the RCA Victor Studio located in Nashville, Tennessee. The album contained a total of 12 tracks. Included was one song composed by Stuckey himself called "Two Together". Most of the album contained cover versions of songs first recorded by other country artists. Many of these covers were originally duets as well. One of these duet covers was "Yours Love", which had been released as a single by Dolly Parton and Porter Wagoner. Another duet cover was "Rings of Gold", which had been a top ten country single for Don Gibson and Dottie West. "I Got You" had also been a recent top ten single, but instead recorded by Anita Carter and Waylon Jennings.

Many of the album's remaining tracks were covers first recorded by solo artists. Among these was "I'll Share My World with You", which was a number two single for George Jones in 1969. Also featured as a cover of the number one country and pop single by Sonny James called "Young Love". Actor Tab Hunter would release his own version as a pop single as well. "Something Pretty" had been a top 20 country song for Wynn Stewart in 1968. "Let It Be Me" had first been a pop hit for The Everly Brothers but was revitalized as a duet between Glen Campbell and Bobbie Gentry in 1969. Also included on the album was a cover of the gospel song "Whispering Hope".

== Release and reception ==
Professional ratings
Review scores
Source	Rating
Allmusic	3/5 stars

Young Love was originally released by the RCA Victor label in July 1969. It became Connie Smith's thirteenth studio album and Stuckey's sixth in their careers respectively. The original disc was issued as a vinyl LP, containing six songs on either side of the record. Decades later, Sony Music Entertainment re-released the album to digital and streaming sites including Apple Music. In their August 1969 issue, Billboard magazine gave Young Love a positive review. "Here are some great duets–an honored song format in the country field," the publication wrote. "Album is a must for dealers." AllMusic would later give the album a three out of five star rating. In its original release, Young Love spent ten weeks on the American Billboard Top Country Albums chart, peaking at the number 29 position in August 1969. The only single included on the disc was the duo's cover of "Young Love", which RCA Victor first released in June 1969. The song spent 11 weeks on the Billboard Hot Country Songs chart, peaking at number 20 by August.

== Track listings ==
=== Vinyl version ===
Side one
No.	Title	Writer(s)	Length
1.	"Even the Bad Times Are Good"	Carl Belew; Clyde Pitts	2:20
2.	"Young Love"	Ric Cartey; Carole Joyner	2:15
3.	"Two Together"	Nat Stuckey	2:26
4.	"Whispering Hope"	Alice Hawthorne; Alton Howard	3:40
5.	"I'll Share My World with You"	Ben Wilson	2:26
6.	"I Got You"	Gordon Galbraith; Ricci Mareno	2:08

Side two
No.	Title	Writer(s)	Length
1.	"Together Alone"	Bruce Cockburn	2:44
2.	"Something Pretty"	Wayne Stokes; Charles P. Williams	2:30
3.	"Yours Love"	Harlan Howard	2:58
4.	"Stand Beside Me"	Tompall Glaser	3:00
5.	"Rings of Gold"	Gene Thomas	2:33
6.	"Let It Be Me"	Gilbert Bécaud; Mann Curtis; Pierre Delanoë	3:17

=== Digital version ===
Young Love (download and streaming)
No.	Title	Writer(s)	Length
1.	"Even the Bad Times Are Good"	Belew; Pitts	2:23
2.	"Young Love"	Cartey; Joyner	2:19
3.	"Two Together"	Stuckey	2:27
4.	"Whispering Hope"	Hawthorne; Howard	3:43
5.	"I'll Share My World with You"	Wilson	2:31
6.	"I Got You"	Galbraith; Mareno	2:11
7.	"Together Alone"	Cockburn	2:48
8.	"Something Pretty"	Stokes; Williams	2:31
9.	"Yours Love"	Howard	3:00
10.	"Stand Beside Me"	Glaser	3:01
11.	"Rings of Gold"	Thomas	2:40
12.	"Let It Be Me"	Bécaud; Curtis; Delanoë	3:20

== Personnel ==
All credits are adapted from the liner notes of Young Love and the biography booklet by Barry Mazor titled Just for What I Am.

Musical personnel

- Chet Atkins – guitar
- Joseph Babcock – background vocals
- David Briggs – piano
- Jerry Carrigan – drums
- Fred Carter Jr. – electric guitar
- Ray Edenton – rhythm guitar
- Dolores Edgin – background vocals
- Bobby Dyson – bass
- Roy Huskey – bass
- James Isbell – drums
- Charlie McCoy – guitar, vives
- Weldon Myrick – steel guitar, leader
- June Page – background vocals
- Connie Smith – lead vocals
- Nat Stuckey – lead vocals
- Pete Wade – dobro
- Lamar Watkins – electric guitar
- Hurshel Wiginton – background vocals
- Chip Young – rhythm guitar
- Bill Walker – vibes

Technical personnel

- Bob Ferguson – Producer
- Felton Jarvis – Producer
- Al Pachucki – Engineer

== Chart performance ==
Chart (1969)	Peak position
US Top Country Albums (Billboard)	29

== Release history ==
Region	Date	Format	Label	Ref.
North America	July 1969	Vinyl	RCA Victor Records	
North America	2010s	Music download; streaming	Sony Music Entertainment	
