= Dear Uncle Sam =

Single by Loretta Lynn

from the album I Like 'Em Country
- B-side: "Hurtin' for Certain"
- Released: January 1966
- Recorded: 15 November 1965
- Studio: Columbia (Nashville, Tennessee)
- Genre: Honky tonk country
- Length: 2:14
- Label: Decca
- Songwriter: Loretta Lynn
- Producer: Owen Bradley

Loretta Lynn singles chronology
"When I Hear My Children Pray" (1965)	"Dear Uncle Sam" (1966)	"You Ain't Woman Enough (To Take My Man)" (1966)

"Dear Uncle Sam" is a song written and originally recorded by the American country artist Loretta Lynn. It was released as a single in January 1966 by Decca Records.

== Background and reception ==
"Dear Uncle Sam" was recorded at the Columbia Recording Studio in Nashville, Tennessee on 15 November 1965. The session was produced by the studio's co-founder, renowned country music producer Owen Bradley. Three additional tracks were recorded during this session, including the single's B-side, "Hurtin' for Certain".

"Dear Uncle Sam" is told from the perspective of a wife whose spouse is entering the Vietnam War and was one of the first country music songs to discuss war. It was Lynn's second self-composed song to enter the country music charts, the first being "I'm a Honky Tonk Girl" in 1960.

"Dear Uncle Sam" reached number four on the Billboard Hot Country Singles survey in 1966. It was her seventh top ten single on the country chart. It was included on her 1966 studio album, I Like 'Em Country.

== Track listings ==
7" vinyl single

- "Dear Uncle Sam" – 2:14
- "Hurtin' for Certain'" – 2:00

== Charts ==
=== Weekly charts ===
Chart (1966)	Peak position
US Hot Country Singles (Billboard)	4
