= The Best of Connie Smith =

The Best of Connie Smith may refer to:

- The Best of Connie Smith (1967 album)
- The Best of Connie Smith (1989 album)

== See also ==
- Connie Smith albums discography
