= I Like 'Em Country =

Studio album by Loretta Lynn
- Released: March 28, 1966
- Recorded: February 26, 1964–January 13, 1966
- Studio: Columbia (Nashville, Tennessee)
- Genre: Country
- Length: 28:21
- Label: Decca
- Producer: Owen Bradley

Loretta Lynn chronology
| Hymns (1965) | I Like 'Em Country (1966) | You Ain't Woman Enough (1966) |

Singles from I Like 'Em Country
- 1. "The Home You're Tearin' Down" Released: July 26, 1965; 2. "Dear Uncle Sam" Released: December 27, 1965

I Like 'Em Country is the sixth solo studio album by American country music singer-songwriter Loretta Lynn. It was released on March 28, 1966, by Decca Records.

The album features only one song written by Lynn, "Dear Uncle Sam". It also includes covers of other artists' hits, including Hank Williams' "Your Cheatin' Heart" and Johnny Cash's "Cry, Cry, Cry".

== Critical reception ==
Professional ratings
Review scores
| Source | Rating |
|---|---|
| Allmusic | 3/5 stars |

A review published in the April 9, 1966 issue of Billboard said, ""Dear Uncle Sam" was a big hit for Loretta Lynn, and this album, which contains the tune, should leap onto the Hot Country Albums Chart. The stereo is great and Loretta comes through in fine style on country standards like "Jealous Heart", "It's Been So Long, Darling", and "Your Cheatin' Heart".

== Commercial performance ==
The album debuted at No. 27 on the US Billboard Hot Country Albums chart dated April 23, 1966. It peaked at No. 2 on the chart dated June 4. The album spent 29 weeks on the chart, 14 of which were in the top 10.

The first single, "The Home You're Tearin' Down" was released in July 1965 and peaked at No. 10 on the US Billboard Hot Country Singles chart. The second single, "Dear Uncle Sam", was released in December 1965 and peaked at No. 4.

== Recording ==
Recording for the album began on November 15, 1965 at the Columbia Recording Studios in Nashville, Tennessee. Two additional recording sessions followed on January 6 and 13, 1966. Three songs on the album were from sessions for previous albums. "Go On and Go" was recorded during the February 26, 1964 session for 1964's Before I'm Over You; "The Home You're Tearin' Down" was recorded during the March 4, 1965 session for 1965's Blue Kentucky Girl; and "Today Has Been a Day" was recorded during the October 15, 1964 session for 1965's Songs from My Heart.....

== Track listing ==
Side one
| No. | Title | Writer(s) | Recording date | Length |
|---|---|---|---|---|
| 1. | "Two Mules Pull This Wagon" | Johnny Russell | January 13, 1966 | 1:58 |
| 2. | "It's Been So Long Darlin'" | Ernest Tubb | January 6, 1966 | 2:26 |
| 3. | "Sometimes You Just Can't Win" | Smokey Stover | January 13, 1966 | 2:30 |
| 4. | "If Teardrops Were Pennies" | Carl Butler | January 6, 1966 | 2:18 |
| 5. | "Your Cheatin' Heart" | Hank Williams | January 6, 1966 | 2:55 |
| 6. | "Go On and Go" | Betty Sue Perry | February 26, 1964 | 2:20 |

Side two
| No. | Title | Writer(s) | Recording date | Length |
|---|---|---|---|---|
| 1. | "Cry, Cry, Cry" | Johnny Cash | January 6, 1966 | 2:12 |
| 2. | "The Home You're Tearin' Down" | Betty Sue Perry | March 4, 1965 | 2:26 |
| 3. | "Hurtin' for Certain" | Richard D. Steadtler | November 15, 1965 | 2:00 |
| 4. | "Today Has Been a Day" | Jackie Webb | October 15, 1964 | 2:12 |
| 5. | "Jealous Heart" | Jenny Lou Carson | January 6, 1966 | 2:50 |
| 6. | "Dear Uncle Sam" | Loretta Lynn | November 15, 1965 | 2:14 |

== Personnel ==
Adapted from the Decca recording session records.

- Willie Ackerman – drums
- Harold Bradley – electric bass guitar
- Owen Bradley – producer
- David Briggs – piano
- Floyd Cramer – piano
- Ray Edenton – acoustic guitar
- Buddy Harman – drums
- Don Helms – steel guitar
- Kelso Herston – guitar
- Junior Huskey – bass
- The Jordanaires – background vocals
- Jerry Kennedy – guitar
- Loretta Lynn – lead vocals
- Grady Martin – electric guitar, guitar
- Bob Moore – bass
- Wayne Moss – guitar
- Hal Rugg – steel guitar
- Pete Wade – guitar
- Joe Zinkan – bass

== Charts ==
Album

| Chart (1966) | Peak position |
|---|---|
| US Hot Country Albums (Billboard) | 2 |

Singles

| Title | Year | Peak position |
| Title | Year | US Country |
|---|---|---|
| "The Home You're Tearin' Down" | 1965 | 10 |
| "Dear Uncle Sam" | 1965 | 4 |
