= If You're Not Gone Too Long =

- German release picture sleeve

Single by Loretta Lynn

from the album Singin' with Feelin'
- B-side: "A Man I Hardly Know"
- Released: May 1967
- Recorded: 18 January 1967
- Studio: Bradley's Barn, Mount Juliet, Tennessee
- Genre: Honky tonk country
- Length: 2:36
- Label: Decca
- Songwriter(s): Wanda Ballman
- Producer(s): Owen Bradley

Loretta Lynn singles chronology
"Sweet Thang" (1967)	"If You're Not Gone Too Long" (1967)	"What Kind of a Girl (Do You Think I Am)" (1967)

"If You're Not Gone Too Long" is a song written by Wanda Ballman. It was originally recorded by American country artist Loretta Lynn. It was released as a single in May 1967 via Decca Records.

== Background and reception ==
"If You're Not Gone Too Long" was recorded at Bradley's Barn studio in Mount Juliet, Tennessee on January 18, 1967. The session was produced by the studio's owner, renowned country music producer Owen Bradley. Three additional tracks were recorded during this session.

The song was covered by American country artist Reba McEntire for a tribute to Lynn in 2010 entitled Coal Miner's Daughter: A Tribute to Loretta Lynn.

"If You're Not Gone Too Long" reached number seven on the Billboard Hot Country Singles survey in 1967. The song became her tenth top ten single under the Decca recording label. It was included on her studio album, Singin' with Feelin' (1967).

== Track listings ==
7" vinyl single

- "The Home You're Tearing Down" – 2:44
- "Farther to Go" – 2:24

== Charts ==
=== Weekly charts ===
Chart (1967)	Peak position
US Hot Country Singles (Billboard)	7
