= Coal Miners' Museum (Van Lear) =

Museum in Van Lear, Kentucky, US

- Location within Kentucky Location within the United States
- Established: 1984
- Location: 78 Millers Creek Road, Van Lear, Kentucky
- Coordinates: 37.77116°N 82.758358°W
- Type: Heritage centre
- Director: Tina S. Webb
- Website: Official website

The Coal Miners' Museum is a museum in Van Lear, Kentucky, dedicated to the area's coal mining history. The museum is administered by the Van Lear Historical Society.

== History ==
The museum was originally built in 1913 to serve as the Consolidation Coal Company's (Consol) office for Van Lear. Along with Consol's office, the building also contained several businesses and has even housed Van Lear's city hall. After the building was abandoned, Citizens National Bank eventually purchased it and in 1984 it was given to the Van Lear Historical Society. The historical society then established the Coal Miners' Museum.

== Exhibits ==
- Coal mining tools.
- Veteran's Wall of Fame.
- A documentary of Van Lear during the 1930s.
- Model of Van Lear.
- Displays showing the community during the boom years.
- Icky's 1950s soda fountain.
- Replica of the old post office.
- Replica of the old doctor's office.
