= Mine No. 5 Store =

- U.S. National Register of Historic Places
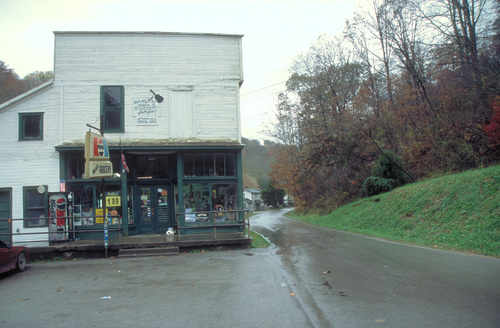

- Location within Kentucky Location within the United States
- Location: Van Lear, Kentucky, United States
- Coordinates: 37°46′22″N 82°43′41″W
- Area: .18 acres (0.073 ha)
- Built: 1918
- NRHP reference No.: 88003172
- Added to NRHP: January 26, 1989

The Mine No. 5 Store (Now known as Webb's Store) is a historic department store located in Van Lear, Kentucky, United States. The two-story, wood-frame building was constructed in 1918 by Consolidated Coal Company. On January 26, 1989, the structure was added to the National Register of Historic Places.

Currently, the building is owned by Herman Webb, the brother of country music star, Loretta Lynn. Tourists can also receive a tour of the childhood home of Loretta Lynn and Crystal Gayle by stopping at the store. Admission is five dollars per person.
