= Van Lear, Kentucky =

Unincorporated community in Kentucky, United States

- Unincorporated community
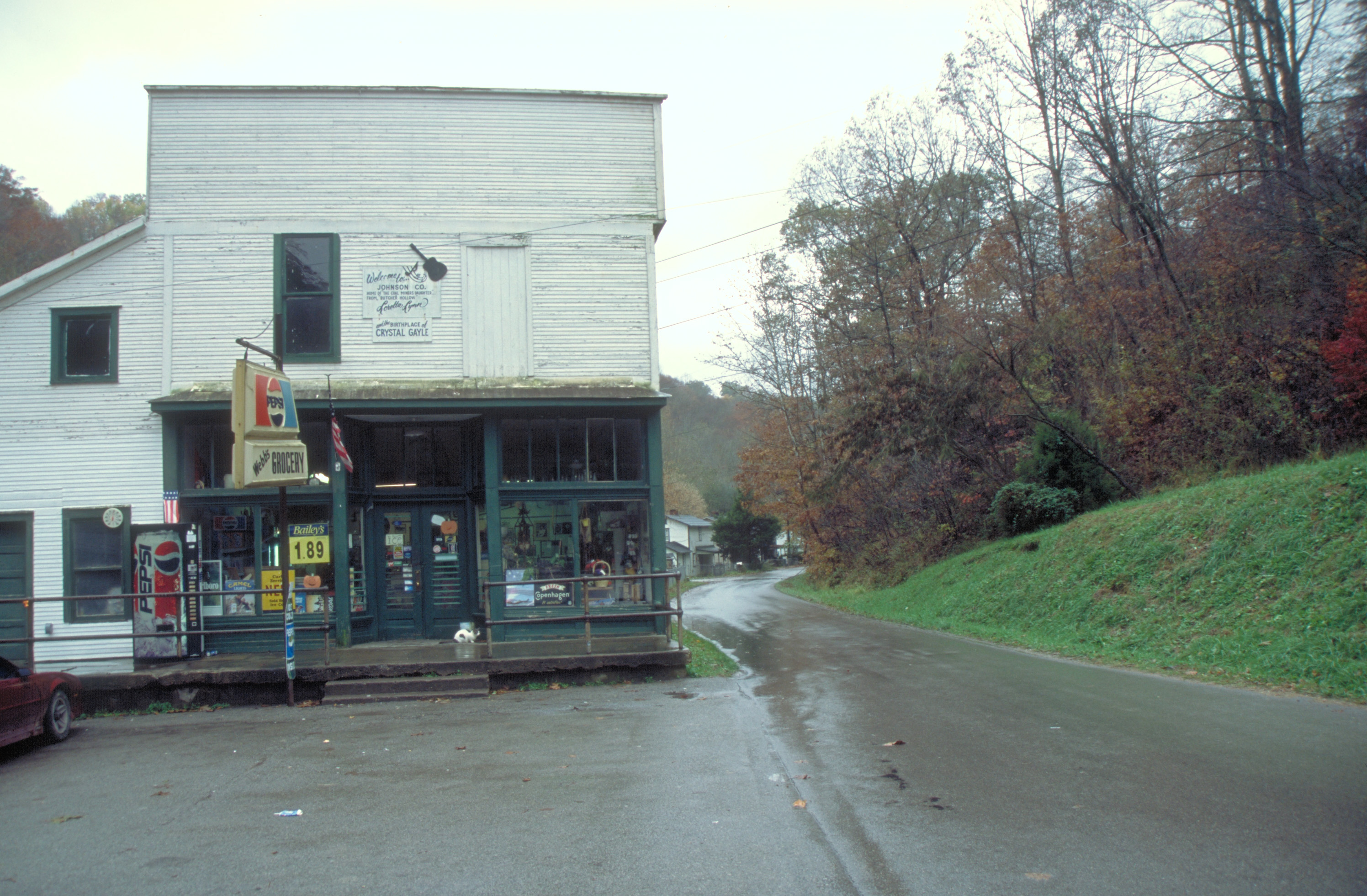
- An old-fashioned country store stands by the roadside in Van Lear.

- Location within Kentucky Location within the United States
- Coordinates: 37°46′16″N 82°45′29″W
- Country: United States
- State: Kentucky
- County: Johnson

Area
  - Total: 4.10 sq mi (10.63 km^{2})
  - Land: 4.07 sq mi (10.53 km^{2})
  - Water: 0.039 sq mi (0.10 km^{2})
- Elevation: 643 ft (196 m)

Population (2020)
  - Total: 893
  - Density: 219.6/sq mi (84.79/km^{2})
- Time zone: UTC-5 (Eastern (EST))
  - Summer (DST): UTC-4 (EDT)
- ZIP codes: 41265
- FIPS code: 21-79194
- GNIS feature ID: 505958
- Website: www.vanlearkentucky.com

Van Lear is an unincorporated community and coal town in Johnson County, Kentucky, United States.

== History ==
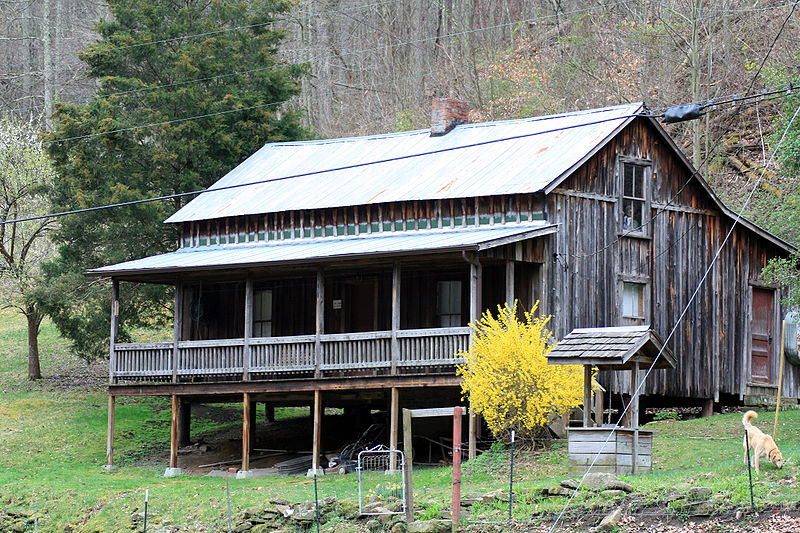
Childhood home of Loretta Lynn

Incorporated in 1912, the town was named for a director of Consolidation Coal Company (Consol), Van Lear Black. It owes its existence to the viable efforts of John Caldwell Calhoun Mayo. Mayo bought coal rights to land along Miller's Creek in Johnson County, which he later sold to Northern Coal and Coke, which in turn was later acquired by Consol.

Consol built five miles of railroad into the Johnson County property with money loaned by Van Lear Black's Fidelity Trust. Eventually five coal mines were opened and operated in Van Lear from 1910 through 1946. The vast coal deposits were mined from five underground mines around the clock. The miners included immigrant Irish, Italians and Slavs, as well as Appalachians and locals. The mines were integrated; both blacks and whites worked underground. During the boom years the population surpassed 4000.

In 1945 Consol merged with the Pittsburgh Coal Company, then divested itself of its Miller's Creek properties. The people who lived in company-owned housing were given first chance to purchase those homes and many did. However, most of the major buildings were torn down.

== Van Lear today ==
Currently, Van Lear is an unincorporated community. There are no deep mines operating in Van Lear proper, although some mines operate nearby. Most of the residents work in locations outside Van Lear, including the nearby cities of Paintsville, Prestonsburg, and Pikeville. Since the end of local mining, only a handful of businesses continue to operate in the Van Lear area, including a bookstore, Icky's 1950s Snack Shop (located inside the Coal Miners' Museum), Mine number 5 store/Webb's store, (owned by Loretta (Webb) Lynn's family) and Blood Moon Security Solutions, a private security company.

Residents work in mining, education, health care, government, and retail/service jobs. The present population of Van Lear proper is roughly 1600. The total population of the Van Lear postal district (including Butcher Hollow) is over 3000.

The Van Lear mines are referred to by country music singer Loretta Lynn in her songs "Coal Miner's Daughter" and in the title song of her Van Lear Rose album, by Tyler Childers in the song "Coal" from his "Bottles and Bibles" album, and by Dwight Yoakam in "Miner's Prayer" from his Guitars, Cadillacs, Etc., Etc. album. Lynn was born in Butcher Hollow and Yoakam in nearby Pikeville.

== Geography ==
Van Lear is located at 37°46′16″N 82°45′29″W (37.7712067, -82.7579371). It has an elevation of 643 feet (196 meters).

== Demographics ==
Historical population
Census	Pop.	Note	%±
1920	2,056		—
1930	2,338		13.7%
1940	1,723		−26.3%
1950	1,096		−36.4%
1960	921		−16.0%
1970	1,033		12.2%
1980	2,035		97.0%
1990	1,050		−48.4%
2000	2,106		100.6%
2010	1,857		−11.8%
2020	893		−51.9%
Van Lear, incorporated and CDP years.

According to the census of 2000, there were 2,106 people, 807 households, and 625 families in the ZIP Code Tabulation Area for Van Lear's ZIP code (41265).

The racial makeup of the community was 99.7% White, 0.0% African American, and 0.3% Asian.

In the community, there were 807 households, out of which 33.5% had children under the age of 18, 63.7% were married couples living together, 10.2% had a female householder with no husband present, and 22.6% were non-families. 19.6% of all households were made up of individuals, and the average family size was 2.99.

The median income for a household in the ZCTA was $26,600, and the median income for a family was $29,556. Males had a median income of $30,000 versus $18,375 for females. The per capita income for the ZCTA was $15,269. About 14.2% of families were below the poverty line.

== Education ==
Most students in Van Lear attend:

- Porter Elementary school at Hager Hill (kindergarten-sixth grade)
- Johnson County Middle School in Paintsville (seventh-eighth grade)
- Johnson Central High School in Paintsville (ninth-twelfth grade)

== Notable residents ==
- Loretta Lynn, country music singer.
- Crystal Gayle, country music singer and younger sister of Loretta Lynn.
- Peggy Sue (singer), country music singer and younger sister of Loretta Lynn.

== See also ==
- Coal Miners' Museum
- Mine No. 5 Store
