= Nat Stuckey =

American singer-songwriter

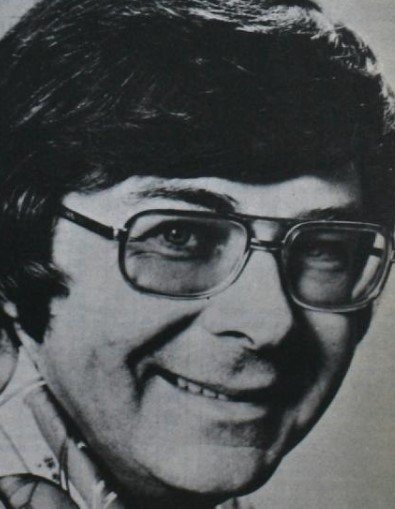
- Stuckey in 1977

Background information
- Born: Nathan Wright Stuckey; December 17, 1933; Cass County, Texas, United States
- Died: August 24, 1988 (aged 54) Nashville, Tennessee, United States
- Genres: Country
- Occupation: Singer-songwriter
- Instrument: Guitar
- Years active: 1965–1988
- Labels: Paula, RCA, MCA

Nathan Wright Stuckey (December 17, 1933 – August 24, 1988) was an American country singer. He recorded for various labels between 1966 and 1978, charting in the top 10 of Hot Country Songs with "Sweet Thang", "Plastic Saddle", "Sweet Thang and Cisco" and "Take Time to Love Her"

== Biography ==
Reared in Atlanta in Cass County, Texas, United States, Stuckey attended Arlington State College, now the University of Texas at Arlington, from which he earned a radio and television degree. Stuckey established himself as a radio announcer, first at KALT in Atlanta, Texas, and then at KWKH in Shreveport, Louisiana, where he worked alongside Frank Page and Louise Alley, a pioneer woman broadcaster and owner of an advertising agency. Along with Jim Reeves, Stuckey became a member of the former KWKH Country music show known as the Louisiana Hayride.

In 1965, Stuckey co-wrote Buck Owens' number-one single "Waitin' in Your Welfare Line". He then wrote and recorded "Sweet Thang" on Paula Records.

Another of Stuckey's compositions, "Pop a Top", was recorded by Jim Ed Brown on RCA Records in 1967 and by Alan Jackson in 1999. A year later, Stuckey signed with RCA himself. Among his hits for RCA were "Plastic Saddle" and "Sweet Thing and Cisco".

Stuckey teamed with Connie Smith on the duet of "Young Love", followed by another single and two albums. The duo was in the final nominations for a Grammy for their version of "Whispering Hope".

After seven years with RCA, Stuckey signed with MCA Records. With Conway Twitty and David Barnes producing, his single "Sun Comin' Up" made the top 20, but none of his other MCA releases did. He last charted in 1978 with the number 26 single "The Days of Sand and Shovels".

Stuckey also went on to direct in producing sessions, along with announcing and singing jingles on hundreds of regional and national commercials. He wrote two jingles for Coca-Cola in the 1970s, recorded twenty-two spots of McDonald's, and was the singing voice on the last Spuds MacKenzie commercial for Budweiser. He continued recording jingles into the 1980s.

Another project was the ownership of Music Row Talent, Inc., a booking agency in Nashville, Tennessee, which was in business for twelve years. Through his Texas Promise Land Development Company, Stuckey began acquiring land in both Tennessee and Texas.

Shortly before Stuckey's death, Randy Travis released "Diggin' Up Bones", which Stuckey co-wrote.

On August 24, 1988, Stuckey died of lung cancer in a Nashville, Tennessee hospital.

== Discography ==
=== Albums ===
Year	Album	US Country	Label
1966	Nat Stuckey Really Sings	6	Paula
1967	All My Tomorrows	28	Paula
1968	Stuckey Style	—	Paula
1968	Nat Stuckey Sings	37	RCA Victor
1969	Keep 'Em Country	27	RCA Victor
1969	Young Love (w/ Connie Smith)	29	RCA Victor
1969	New Country Roads	27	RCA Victor
1970	Sunday Morning with Nat Stuckey & Connie Smith (w/ Connie Smith)	—	RCA Victor
1970	Old Man Willis	—	RCA Victor
1970	Country Fever	38	RCA Victor
1971	She Wakes Me with a Kiss Every Morning	20	RCA Victor
1971	Only a Woman Like You	—	RCA Victor
1972	Forgive Me for Calling You Darling	37	RCA Victor
1972	Is It Any Wonder That I Love You	40	RCA Victor
1973	Take Time to Love Her / I Used It All On You	37	RCA Victor
1974	The Best of Nat Stuckey	33	RCA Victor
1976	Independence	37	MCA

=== Singles ===
Year	Single	Chart Positions		Album
Year	Single	US Country	CAN Country	Album
1965	"Hurting Again"	—	—	single only
1966	"Don't You Believe Her"	—	—	Nat Stuckey Really Sings
1966	"Sweet Thang"	4	—	Nat Stuckey Really Sings
1967	"Oh! Woman"	17	—	Nat Stuckey Really Sings
1967	"All My Tomorrows"	27	—	All My Tomorrows
1967	"You're Puttin' Me On"	67	—	All My Tomorrows
1967	"Adorable Women"	41	—	All My Tomorrows
1968	"My Can Do Can't Keep Up with My Want To"	17	—	Stuckey Style
1968	"Leave This One Alone"	63	—	single only
1968	"Plastic Saddle"	9	8	Nat Stuckey Sings
1969	"Joe and Mabel's 12th Street Bar and Grill"	13	—	Nat Stuckey Sings
1969	"Cut Across Shorty"	15	—	New Country Roads
1969	"Young Love" (w/ Connie Smith)	20	—	Young Love
1969	"Sweet Thang and Cisco"	8	4	Country Fever
1970	"Sittin' in Atlanta Station"	33	16	single only
1970	"If God Is Dead (Who's That Living in My Soul)" (w/ Connie Smith)	59	—	Sunday Morning
1970	"Old Man Willis"	31	31	Old Man Willis
1970	"Whiskey, Whiskey"	31	—	Country Fever
1971	"She Wakes Me with a Kiss Every Morning (And She Loves Me to Sleep Every Night)"	11	5	She Wakes Me with a Kiss Every Morning
1971	"Only a Woman Like You"	24	—	Only a Woman Like You
1971	"I'm Gonna Act Right"	17	34	Forgive Me for Calling You Darling
1972	"Forgive Me for Calling You Darling"	16	6	Forgive Me for Calling You Darling
1972	"Is It Any Wonder That I Love You"	26	—	Is It Any Wonder That I Love You
1972	"Don't Pay the Ransom"	18	28	Is It Any Wonder That I Love You
1973	"Take Time to Love Her"	10	14	Take Time to Love Her / I Used It All On You
1973	"I Used It All On You"	22	14	Take Time to Love Her / I Used It All On You
1973	"Got Leaving On Her Mind"	14	36	singles only
1974	"You Never Say You Love Me Anymore"	31	95	singles only
1974	"It Hurts to Know the Feeling's Gone"	42	—	singles only
1974	"You Don't Have to Go Home"	36	—	singles only
1975	"Boom Boom Barroom Man"	85	—	singles only
1976	"Sun Comin' Up"	13	33	Independence
1976	"The Way He's Treated You"	46	—	Independence
1976	"That's All She Ever Said Except Goodbye"	42	—	Independence
1977	"The Shady Side of Charlotte"	48	—	singles only
1977	"Fallin' Down"	—	—	singles only
1977	"Buddy, I Lied"	63	—	singles only
1977	"I'm Coming Home to Face the Music"	62	—	singles only
1978	"That Lucky Old Sun (Just Rolls Around Heaven All Day)"	66	—	singles only
1978	"The Days of Sand and Shovels"	26	29	singles only
