= Peggy Sue (singer) =

- Born: Peggy Sue Webb; March 25, 1943 (age 83)
- Origin: Butcher Hollow, Kentucky, U.S.
- Genres: Country
- Occupation: Singer-songwriter
- Instrument: Vocals
- Years active: 1966–present
- Labels: Decca; CR; Doorknob; Meteor; Big R

Peggy Sue Wright (née Webb; born March 25, 1943) is a country music singer and songwriter, who had brief success as a country singer in the late 1960s. She is the middle sister of two popular country performers, Loretta Lynn and Crystal Gayle. Her older brother Willie "Jay" Lee Webb was a country music singer/songwriter in the 1960s.

== Biography ==
Peggy Sue Wright was born Peggy Sue Webb in a cabin in Butcher Hollow, Kentucky, on March 25, 1943. She is the second daughter and the sixth child born to Clara Marie "Clary" (née Ramey; May 5, 1912 – November 24, 1981) and Melvin Theodore "Ted" Webb (June 6, 1906 – February 22, 1959). Webb was a coal miner and subsistence farmer.

The family was poor; living hand-to-mouth and relying on her father's meager income. Wright had five older siblings: Melvin "Junior" Webb (1929–1993), Loretta Lynn (April 14, 1932 – October 4, 2022), Herman Webb (1934–2018), Willie "Jay" Lee Webb (February 12, 1937 – July 31, 1996), and Donald Ray Webb (1941–2017). Her two younger sisters are Betty Ruth Hopkins (née Webb; born 1946), and Crystal Gayle (born Brenda Gail Webb; January 9, 1951).

The family moved to Wabash, Indiana, in 1955 due to her father's illness from working in the coal mines; he would die in 1959 of black lung disease. She began performing with Loretta and her brothers at venues around Wabash. Wright then became a featured act in Loretta's early shows in the 1960s. She also helped write a few of Loretta's compositions, including "Don't Come Home A' Drinkin' (With Lovin' on Your Mind)." In 1969, she signed with Decca Records and released her debut single, "I'm Dynamite," which went into the country top 30. That same year, she released an album of the same name. The second single from that album titled, "I'm Gettin' Tired of Babyin' You" also reached the top 30.

After Peggy Sue had a hit with her most successful single, "All-American Husband", she left Decca Records after releasing two albums. Next, Wright recorded two albums in the 1970s for two small labels.

Peggy Sue was married twice. Her first marriage was to Douglas Wells (m. 1964-div. 1968); the second was to Sonny Wright (m. 1970-). From her first marriage, Peggy had one daughter: Doyletta Gayle; born May 30, 1967. Doyletta Gayle was named after Doyle Wilburn and Wright's sisters: Loretta Lynn and Crystal Gayle. Doyletta became a victim of spousal abuse when she was killed by her spouse on February 22, 1991.

After 1970, she did not appear on the Billboard country charts until 1977. Beginning then, she had a small string of minor hits on her second husband Sonny Wright's label, Doorknob.

In 1986, she began performing as a background singer and designing stage costumes for her younger sister, Crystal Gayle. She continues to perform with Gayle today. Occasionally, they would both join with older sister Loretta Lynn for a concert at her Hurricane Mills, Tennessee, ranch.

== Discography ==
=== Albums ===
Year	Title	US Country	Label
1969	Dynamite!	33	Decca
1970	All-American Husband	—	Decca
1974	One Side (w/ Sonny Wright)	—	CR
1977	I Just Came in Here	—	Doorknob
1981	Gently Hold Me (w/ Sonny Wright)	—	Big R

=== Singles ===
Year	Single	US Country	CB Country	Album
1969	"I'm Dynamite"	28	10	Dynamite!
1969	"I'm Gettin' Tired of Babyin' You"^{A}	30	13	Dynamite!
1970	"After the Preacher's Gone"	65	—	All American Husband
1970	"All American Husband"	37	34	All American Husband
1970	"Apron Strings"	58	59	All American Husband
1971	"I Say, 'Yes, Sir'"	68	50	Singles only
1971	"L-O-V-E, Love"	—	—	Singles only
1974	"Two Ring Circus" (w/ Sonny Wright)	—	—	One Side
1977	"Every Beat of My Heart"	34	45	I Just Came in Here
1977	"I Just Came in Here (To Let a Little Hurt Out)"	51	64	I Just Came in Here
1977	"Good Evening Henry"	81	—	I Just Came in Here
1977	"If This Is What Love's All About" (w/ Sonny Wright)	100	—	I Just Came in Here
1978	"To Be Loved"	85	88	Single only
1978	"Let Me Down Easy"	87	91	I Just Came in Here
1978	"All Night Long"	80	—	Singles only
1978	"How I Love You in the Morning"	37	47	Singles only
1979	"I Want to See Me in Your Eyes"	30	37	Gently Hold Me
1979	"The Love Song and the Dream Belong to Me"	51	57	Single only
1979	"Gently Hold Me" (w/ Sonny Wright)	86	92	Gently Hold Me
1980	"For as Long as You Want Me"	80	—	Singles only
1980	"Why Don't You Go to Dallas"	93	—	Singles only

- ^{A}"I'm Gettin' Tired of Babyin' You" also peaked at number 27 on the RPM Country Tracks chart in Canada.
