= Sweet Thang =

Single by Nat Stuckey

from the album Nat Stuckey Really Sings
- B-side: "Paralyze My Mind"
- Released: August 1966
- Recorded: July 4, 1966
- Studio: Brians Studio
- Genre: Country; traditional country
- Length: 2:00
- Label: Paula
- Songwriter(s): Nat Stuckey
- Producer(s): Frank Page; Nat Stuckey

Nat Stuckey singles chronology
| "Don't You Believe Her" (1966) | "Sweet Thang" (1966) | "Oh! Woman" (1967) |

"Sweet Thang" is a song written and originally recorded by American country artist Nat Stuckey. It was Stuckey's first major hit as a music artist, peaking in the top ten of the national country music charts. In later years, it would notably be recorded by Ernest Tubb and Loretta Lynn.

== Nat Stuckey version ==
The song was first recorded by Nat Stuckey shortly after signing a recording contract with the independent label Paula Records. The label was based out of Shreveport, Louisiana. Stuckey had also composed the song. "Sweet Thang" was recorded at Brians Studio, located in Tyler, Texas. It took place on July 4, 1966 and co-produced by Stuckey and Frank Page. Additional tracks that later appeared on his debut album were also recorded in the same session.

"Sweet Thang" was released as a single in August 1966 via Paula Records. The song peaked at number four on the Billboard Hot Country Singles chart in 1966. The song became Stuckey's biggest hit as a music artist. "Sweet Thang" appeared on his debut studio album, also released on Paula Records entitled Nat Stuckey Really Sings. He would continue having major hits into the 1970s with songs such as "Plastic Saddle."

=== Track listing ===
7" vinyl single

- "Sweet Thang" – 2:37
- "Paralyze My Mind" – 2:29

=== Chart performance ===
| Chart (1966) | Peak position |
|---|---|
| US Hot Country Songs (Billboard) | 4 |

== Ernest Tubb and Loretta Lynn version ==
"Sweet Thang"

Single by Ernest Tubb and Loretta Lynn

from the album Singin' Again
- B-side: "Beautiful, Unhappy Home"
- Released: January 1967
- Recorded: December 21, 1966
- Studio: Columbia Recording Studio
- Genre: Country; Honky-tonk
- Length: 2:32
- Label: Decca
- Songwriter(s): Nat Stuckey
- Producer(s): Owen Bradley

Ernest Tubb singles chronology
| "Another Story, Another Time, Another Place" (1966) | "Sweet Thang" (1967) | "In the Jailhouse Now" (1967) |

Loretta Lynn singles chronology
| "To Heck with Ole Santa Claus" (1966) | "Sweet Thang" (1967) | "If You're Not Gone Too Long" (1967) |

"Sweet Thang" was notably recorded as a duet in 1967 by American country artists Ernest Tubb and Loretta Lynn. The song was recorded at the Columbia Recording Studio on December 21, 1966. The studio was located in Nashville, Tennessee. The sessions was produced by Owen Bradley. Bradley was both artists' producer on the Decca record label in the 1960s also produced their previous duet album release.

"Sweet Thang" was released as a single in January 1967 via Decca Records. It spent a total of nine weeks on the Billboard Hot Country Singles chart before reaching number 45 in April 1967. "Sweet Thang" was then released on the duo's second studio release entitled Singin' Again. The single was Lynn's first charting song that missed the top 40 on the country songs chart. This would not occur again until 1983.

=== Track listings ===
7" vinyl single

- "Sweet Thang" – 2:32
- "Beautiful Unhappy Home" – 2:15

=== Chart performance ===
| Chart (1967) | Peak position |
|---|---|
| US Hot Country Songs (Billboard) | 45 |
