= Station Inn =

Concert venue in Nashville, Tennessee

The Station Inn
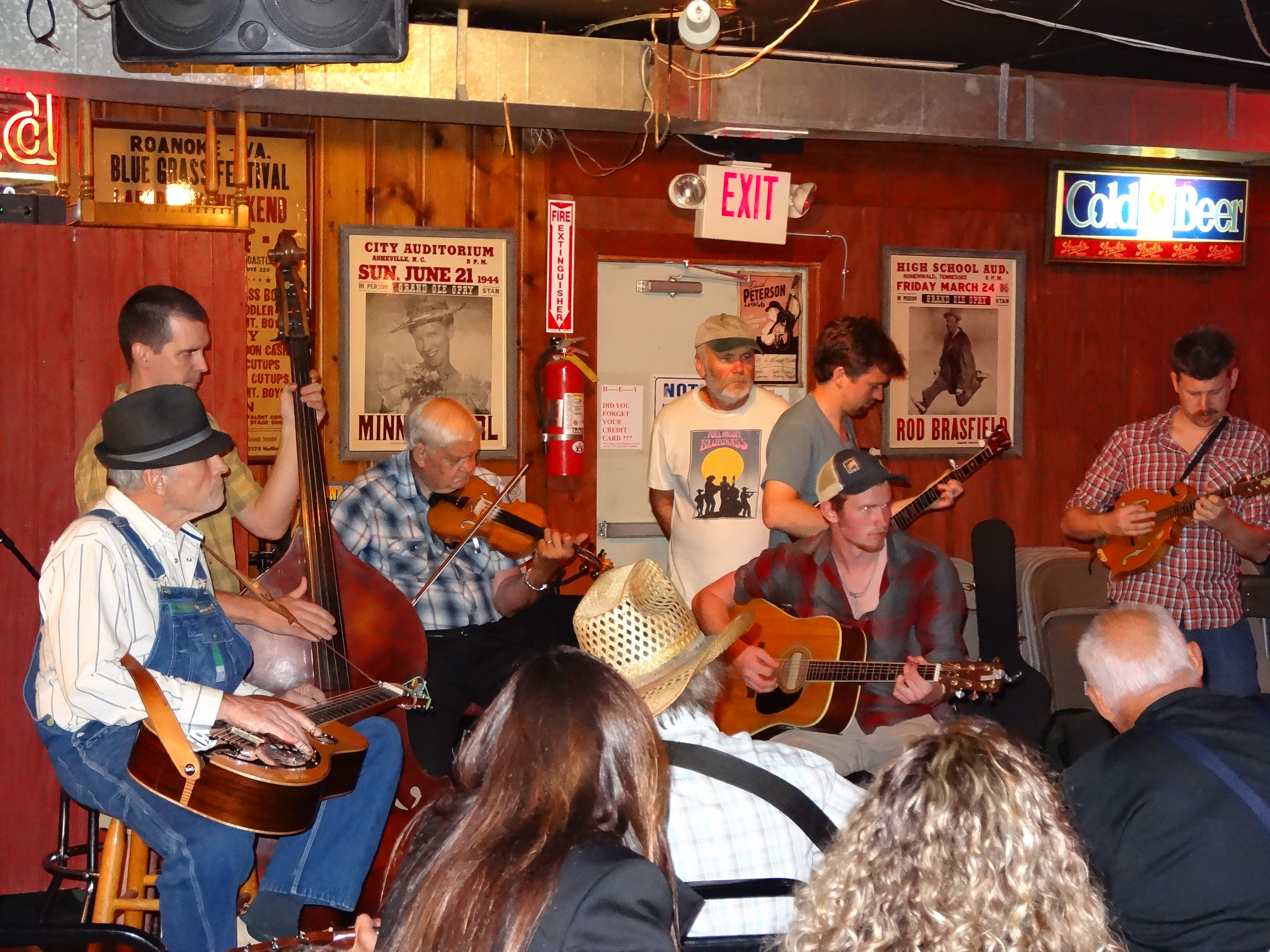
- A group performing at the Station Inn in 2012
- Interactive map of The Station Inn
- Location: 402 12th Avenue, South; Nashville, Tennessee
- Coordinates: 36.152915°N 86.784353°W
- Owner: J.T. Gray
- Type: Music venue
- Events: Bluegrass, country music

Construction
- Opened: 1974

Website
- www.stationinn.com

The Station Inn is a concert venue in Nashville, Tennessee that hosts bluegrass music acts. Frommers wrote that it is "widely regarded as one of the best bluegrass venues around". The small nightclub has a reputation for being a simple building, located near Music Row in proximity to Nashville's major country music recording studios and related businesses, where local and national bluegrass artists and fans convene.

Notable artists such as Bill Monroe, Ricky Skaggs, Alison Krauss, Peter Rowan, Sam Bush, Gillian Welch, Ralph Stanley, Dolly Parton, Randy Travis, Reba McEntire and Off the Wagon have performed at The Station Inn. Mel Gibson and U2 have visited the club as well.

In 2020, the owner of the Station Inn, J.T. Gray, was inducted into the Bluegrass Music Hall of Fame.
