= 1963 in country music =

This is a list of notable events in country music that took place in 1963.

== Events ==
- March — The month marks a dark time for country music, as it lost no less than five people in a seemingly endless string of tragedies.
  - On March 5, three of the genre's top stars – Patsy Cline, Hawkshaw Hawkins and Cowboy Copas – are killed in a small plane crash near Camden, Tennessee, while on their way to Nashville from Kansas City, Kansas. The pilot, Cline's manager and Copas' son-in-law, Randy Hughes, is also killed.
  - En route to Cline's funeral, Jack Anglin – one half of the duo Johnnie & Jack – is killed in a car accident.
  - On March 29, Texas Ruby, of the duo Curly Fox and Texas Ruby, is killed in a trailer fire while Fox was performing on the Grand Ole Opry.
- July — The first issue of the Music City News is published. Its publisher is country music star Faron Young.
- August – Bradley Kincaid, a pioneer of the genre who had been popular on records and radio from the late 1920s until his retirement in 1950, made new recordings of 168 of his favourite songs – more than half of his known repertoire – at a five-day session for Bluebonnet Records in Fort Worth, Texas. 86 of these songs would be issued on seven LP's between 1963 and 1987, the remainder were issued on six Cassette Tapes in 1988.
- September 19 — The Jimmy Dean Show begins a three-year primetime run on ABC. The show — Dean's second go-around on television, following his 1950s series on CBS — is widely hailed by critics for its class treatment of top country stars of the day, many of whom were getting their first true national exposure.

=== No dates ===
- The Wilburn Brothers' TV show debuts in syndication, and features Loretta Lynn as regular vocalist. The show will air first-run episodes, primarily in rural and southern U.S. markets, through 1974 and, riding the heels of Porter Wagoner's weekly TV show, will spark a wave of successful (and a few not-so-successful) syndicated TV shows featuring top-name country stars of the day through the late 1970s and early 1980s.

== Top hits of the year ==
=== Number-one hits ===
==== United States ====
(as certified by Billboard)

Date	Single Name	Artist	Wks. No.1	Notes
January 5	Ruby Ann	Marty Robbins	1
January 19	The Ballad of Jed Clampett	Lester Flatt and Earl Scruggs	3	^{[2]}: Returns to Number One on February 2.; Used as the theme song of the CBS television program, The Beverly Hillbillies.
April 13	Still	Bill Anderson	7	^{[1], [2]}: Returns to Number One on May 11, and then on July 6.
May 4	Lonesome 7-7203	Hawkshaw Hawkins	4	^{[2], [B]}: Returns to Number One on June 1, and then on June 22.; After this song first appeared on the Billboard charts on March 2, it remained absent for 2 weeks, following his death March 5. The song reappeared March 23 and spent 25 weeks on the chart before reaching Number One.
June 15	Act Naturally	Buck Owens	4	^{[2], [A]}: Returns to Number One on June 29, and then on July 13.
July 27	Ring of Fire	Johnny Cash	7	Cash's first Billboard Number One since "Don't Take Your Guns to Town" in 1959.
September 14	Abilene	George Hamilton IV	4	^{[A]}
October 12	Talk Back Trembling Lips	Ernest Ashworth	1	^{[B]}
October 19	Love's Gonna Live Here	Buck Owens	16

Notes

- 1 No. 1 song of the year, as determined by Billboard.
- 2 Song dropped from No. 1 and later returned to top spot.
- A First Billboard No. 1 hit for that artist.
- B Only Billboard No. 1 hit for that artist to date.

=== Other major hits ===
US	Single	Artist
12	Bayou Talk	Jimmy C. Newman
20	Better Times a Comin'	Ray Godfrey
12	Building a Bridge	Claude King
13	Busted	Johnny Cash with Carter Family
9	Call Me Mr. Brown	Skeets McDonald
11	Can't Hang Up the Phone	Stonewall Jackson
14	Cigarettes and Coffee Blues	Marty Robbins
13	Cold and Lonely (Is the Forecast for Tonight)	Kitty Wells
3	Cowboy Boots	Dave Dudley
18	Crazy Arms	Marion Worth
6	Detroit City	Bobby Bare
5	Does He Mean That Much to You	Eddy Arnold
13	Don't Call Me From a Honky Tonk	Johnny & Jonie Mosby
9	Down by the River	Faron Young
18	Down to the River	Rose Maddox
2	Eight by Ten	Bill Anderson
2	End of the World	Skeeter Davis
7	Faded Love	Patsy Cline
14	Fool Me Once	Connie Hall
2	From a Jack to a King	Ned Miller
17	Going Through the Motions (Of Living)	Sonny James
12	Goodbye Kisses	Cowboy Copas
3	Guilty	Jim Reeves
11	Happy to Be Unhappy	Gary Buck
12	Head Over Heels in Love with You	Don Gibson
5	Hello Trouble	Orville Couch
13	Hey Lucille!	Claude King
14	I Can't Stay Mad at You	Skeeter Davis
7	I Take the Chance	Ernest Ashworth
18	I Wanna Go Home	Billy Grammer
9	I'm Saving My Love	Skeeter Davis
7	I've Enjoyed as Much of This as I Can Stand	Porter Wagoner
11	I've Got the World by the Tail	Claude King
17	In the Back Room Tonight	Carl Smith
3	Is This Me	Jim Reeves
18	Knock Again, True Love	Claude Gray
8	Leavin' on Your Mind	Patsy Cline
17	Let's Invite Them Over	George Jones and Melba Montgomery
11	Little Ole You	Jim Reeves
18	Lonely Teardops	Rose Maddox
14	Loving Arms	Carl Butler and Pearl
2	Make the World Go Away	Ray Price
9	The Man Who Robbed the Bank at Santa Fe	Hank Snow
12	Mary Ann Regrets	Burl Ives
2	The Matador	Johnny Cash
13	A Million Years or So	Eddy Arnold
9	The Minute You're Gone	Sonny James
2	Mountain of Love	David Houston
8	Mr. Heartache, Move On	Coleman O'Neal
20	My Baby's Not Here (In Town Tonight)	Porter Wagoner
16	My Father's Voice	Judy Lynn
14	Nightmare	Faron Young
2	Ninety Miles an Hour (Down a Dead End Street)	Hank Snow
13	Not So Long Ago	Marty Robbins
7	Not What I Had in Mind	George Jones
8	Old Showboat	Stonewall Jackson
13	The Only Girl I Can't Forget	Del Reeves
13	The Other Woman	Loretta Lynn
8	Pearl Pearl Pearl	Flatt & Scruggs
14	Please Talk to My Heart	Johnny "Country" Mathis
15	Robert E. Lee	Ott Stephens
4	Roll Muddy River	The Wilburn Brothers
7	Sands of Gold	Webb Pierce
15	Sawmill	Webb Pierce
3	Second Hand Rose	Roy Drusky
14	Shake Me I Rattle (Squeeze Me I Cry)	Marion Worth
12	Sheepskin Valley	Claude King
17	Shoes of a Fool	Bill Goodwin
3	Sing a Little Song of Heartache	Rose Maddox
2	Six Days on the Road	Dave Dudley
18	Somebody Told Somebody	Rose Maddox
17	A Stranger Was Here	Darrell McCall
5	Sweet Dreams	Patsy Cline
19	Sweethearts in Heaven	Buck Owens and Rose Maddox
5	T for Texas	Grandpa Jones
6	Take a Letter, Miss Gray	Justin Tubb
10	Tell Her So	The Wilburn Brothers
3	Thanks a Lot	Ernest Tubb
9	Those Wonderful Years	Webb Pierce
10	The Tip of My Fingers	Roy Clark
18	Unkind Words	Kathy Dee
7	Walk Me to the Door	Ray Price
17	The Way It Feels to Die	Vernon Stewart
3	We Must Have Been Out of Our Minds	George Jones and Melba Montgomery
15	We're the Talk of the Town	Buck Owens and Rose Maddox
13	We've Got Something in Common	Faron Young
20	What's in Our Heart	George Jones and Melba Montgomery
15	Wild Wild Wind	Stonewall Jackson
4	The Yellow Bandana	Faron Young
11	Yesterday's Memories	Eddy Arnold
5	You Comb Her Hair	George Jones
11	You Took Her Off My Hands (Now Please Take Her Off My Mind)	Ray Price
10	You're for Me	Buck Owens
12	Your Best Friend and Me	Mac Wiseman

== Top new album releases ==
Album	Artist	Record Label
Blood, Sweat and Tears	Johnny Cash	Columbia
"Detroit City" and Other Hits by Bobby Bare	Bobby Bare	RCA
The Patsy Cline Story	Patsy Cline	Decca
Ring of Fire: The Best of Johnny Cash	Johnny Cash	Columbia
Still	Bill Anderson	Decca

=== Other top albums ===
Album	Artist	Record Label
Buck Owens Sings Tommy Collins	Buck Owens	Capitol
Cattle Call	Eddy Arnold	RCA
Country Music Hootenanny	Various Artists	Capitol
End of the World	Skeeter Davis	RCA
Great Gospel Songs	Tennessee Ernie Ford	Capitol
The Guitar Genius	Chet Atkins	RCA
Love Me Forever	Wanda Jackson	Capitol
Our Man in Nashville	Chet Atkins	RCA
On the Bandstand	Buck Owens	Capitol
Songs I Love to Sing	Eddy Arnold	Capitol
Songs That Made Him Famous	Johnny Bond	Starday
Teen Scene	Chet Atkins	RCA
This Song Is Just for You	Hank Locklin	RCA
Tips of My Fingers	Roy Clark	Capitol
Travelin'	Chet Atkins	RCA
The Ways of Life	Hank Locklin	RCA
Yodeling Hits	Grandpa Jones	Monument

== Births ==
- January 24 — Keech Rainwater, member of Lonestar.
- February 9 — Travis Tritt, country-rock influenced star starting in the early 1990s.
- February 17 – Larry the Cable Guy (born Daniel Lawrence Whitney), comedian and actor, member of Blue Collar Comedy with Jeff Foxworthy, Bill Engvall and Ron White
- July 31 — Chad Brock, rose to fame in the late 1990s.
- August 22 — Mila Mason, enjoyed fame in the late 1990s.
- September 6 — Mark Chesnutt, neotraditional country singer of the 1990s.
- September 30 — Eddie Montgomery, one half of Montgomery Gentry, older brother of John Michael Montgomery.
- November 1 — Big Kenny (born William Kenneth Alphin), one half of Big & Rich and key member of the MuzikMafia.
- December 3 — Ty England, contemporary-styled singer of the mid-1990s, and guitarist member of the Garth Brooks' band.
- December 16 — Jeff Carson, contemporary-styled singer of the mid-1990s (d. 2022).

== Deaths ==
- March 5 — Patsy Cline, 30, premier female country vocalist who became even more legendary after her death (plane crash).
- March 5 — Cowboy Copas, 49, country singer from the 1940s through 1960s, best known for his 1960 hit, "Alabam" (plane crash).
- March 5 — Hawkshaw Hawkins, 41, country singer since the 1940s, best known for his posthumous No. 1 hit, "Lonesome 7-7203" (plane crash).
- March 8 — Jack Anglin, 47, country entertainer since the 1930s, late of the duo Johnnie and Jack (with Johnnie Wright) (car accident).
- March 29 — Texas Ruby, 52, half of the comedy-old-time country duo Curly Fox and Texas Ruby (mobile home fire).
- August 27 – Jim Denny, 52, music executive.

== Country Music Hall of Fame Inductees ==
There were no inductees in 1963.

== Major awards ==
=== Grammy Awards ===
- Best Country and Western Recording — "Detroit City", Bobby Bare

== See also ==
- Billboard Top Country Singles of 1963
- Country Music Association
- Inductees of the Country Music Hall of Fame
