= List of Hot Country Singles number ones of 1963 =

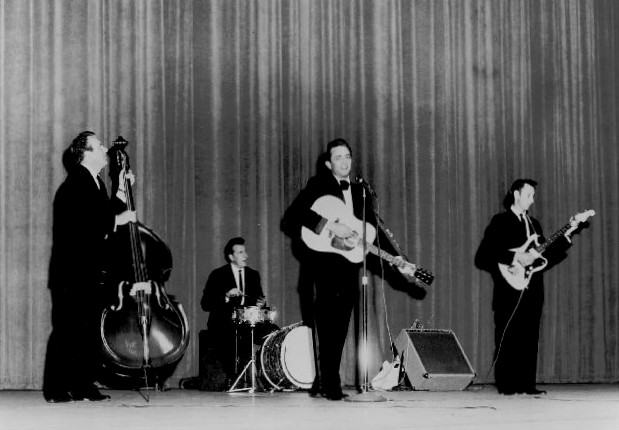
Johnny Cash, pictured performing with his band The Tennessee Three, had a long-running number one with "Ring of Fire".

Hot Country Songs is a chart that ranks the top-performing country music songs in the United States, published by Billboard magazine. In 1963, 10 different singles topped the chart, at the time published under the title Hot Country Singles, although there were 21 distinct runs at the top, as the majority of the singles had multiple spells at number one. Chart placings were based on playlists submitted by country music radio stations and sales reports submitted by stores.

In the issue of Billboard dated January 5, Marty Robbins climbed to number one with "Ruby Ann", replacing "Don't Let Me Cross Over" by Carl Butler and Pearl, which had been in the top spot in the last issue of 1962. Robbins only held the number one position for a single week before the husband-and-wife duo returned to the top of the chart. "Don't Let Me Cross Over" had three separate runs at number one during the early part of the year, the last of which lasted for eight weeks, but it would be the only chart-topper of the duo's career. Separating the song's three runs in the top spot during the spring of 1963 were two spells at number one for "The Ballad of Jed Clampett" by Lester Flatt and Earl Scruggs, the first song in the bluegrass genre to top the chart. The song, the theme from television sitcom "The Beverly Hillbillies", was the only number one for the duo. In May, "Lonesome 7-7203" by Hawkshaw Hawkins topped the chart, his first and only single to reach number one. This was a posthumous success for the singer, who had died in a plane crash two months earlier. Later in the year, both George Hamilton IV and Ernest Ashworth achieved their first Hot Country number ones.

Another act to top the chart for the first time in 1963 was Buck Owens, who achieved a number of chart feats during the year. He spent more weeks at number one in 1963 than any other act, occupying the top spot for a cumulative total of sixteen weeks with "Act Naturally" and "Love's Gonna Live Here". The latter song was number one for the final eleven weeks of the year, the longest unbroken run at the top of the chart during 1963. The song remained at number one for a further five weeks in 1964 for a final total of sixteen consecutive weeks in the top spot. This set a new record for the longest unbroken run at number one on the Hot Country chart which would last for nearly 50 years, when Florida Georgia Line spent a seventeenth consecutive week atop the chart with "Cruise" in 2013. Owens was also the only act to take more than one single to number one in 1963; he went on to become one of the most successful recording artists of the mid-1960s, achieving 15 country number ones in a five-year period.

== Chart history ==
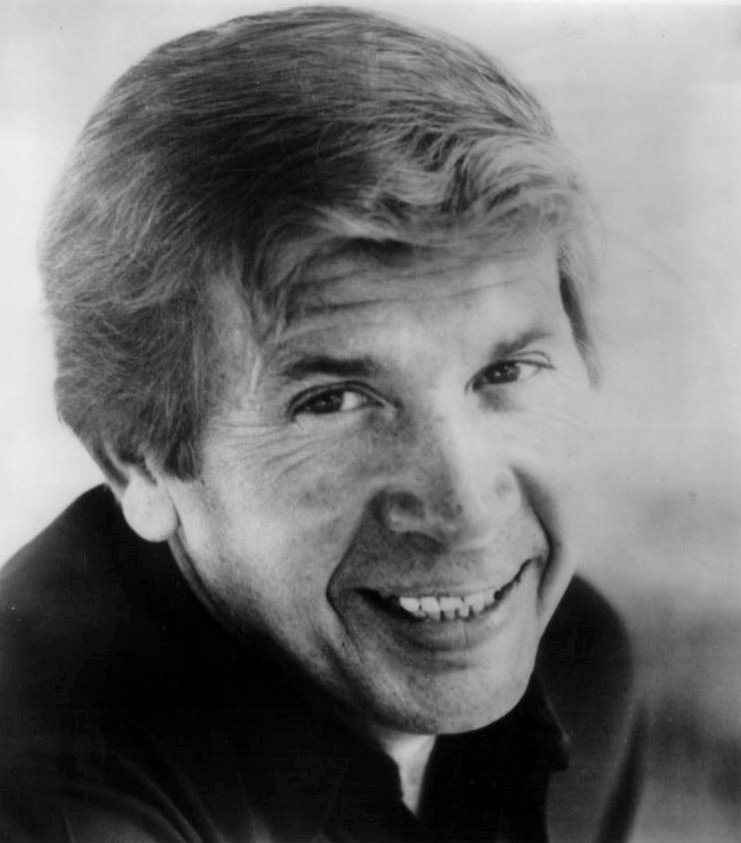
Buck Owens began a record-breaking run at number one in October with "Love's Gonna Live Here".

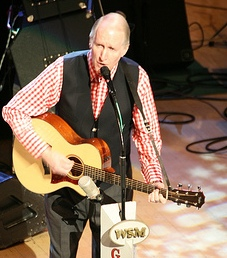
George Hamilton IV (pictured in later life) topped the chart for the first time with "Abilene".

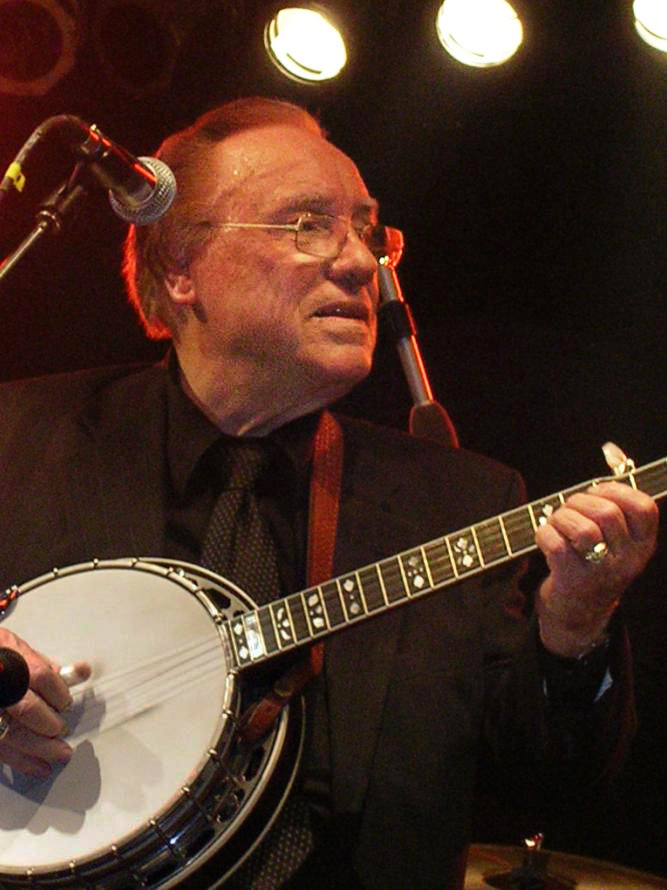
Earl Scruggs (pictured in later life) collaborated with Lester Flatt on the chart-topper "The Ballad of Jed Clampett".

Hot Country Singles number ones of 1963
Issue date	Title	Artist(s)	Ref.
January 5	"Ruby Ann"	Marty Robbins	
January 12	"Don't Let Me Cross Over"	Carl Butler and Pearl	
January 19	"The Ballad of Jed Clampett"	Lester Flatt and Earl Scruggs	
January 26	"Don't Let Me Cross Over"	Carl Butler and Pearl	
February 2	"The Ballad of Jed Clampett"	Lester Flatt and Earl Scruggs	
February 9	"The Ballad of Jed Clampett"	Lester Flatt and Earl Scruggs	
February 16	"Don't Let Me Cross Over"	Carl Butler and Pearl	
February 23	"Don't Let Me Cross Over"	Carl Butler and Pearl	
March 2	"Don't Let Me Cross Over"	Carl Butler and Pearl	
March 9	"Don't Let Me Cross Over"	Carl Butler and Pearl	
March 16	"Don't Let Me Cross Over"	Carl Butler and Pearl	
March 23	"Don't Let Me Cross Over"	Carl Butler and Pearl	
March 30	"Don't Let Me Cross Over"	Carl Butler and Pearl	
April 6	"Don't Let Me Cross Over"	Carl Butler and Pearl	
April 13	"Still"	Bill Anderson	
April 20	"Still"	Bill Anderson	
April 27	"Still"	Bill Anderson	
May 4	"Lonesome 7-7203"	Hawkshaw Hawkins	
May 11	"Still"	Bill Anderson	
May 18	"Still"	Bill Anderson	
May 25	"Still"	Bill Anderson	
June 1	"Lonesome 7-7203"	Hawkshaw Hawkins	
June 8	"Lonesome 7-7203"	Hawkshaw Hawkins	
June 15	"Act Naturally"	Buck Owens	
June 22	"Lonesome 7-7203"	Hawkshaw Hawkins	
June 29	"Act Naturally"	Buck Owens	
July 6	"Still"	Bill Anderson	
July 13	"Act Naturally"	Buck Owens	
July 20	"Act Naturally"	Buck Owens	
July 27	"Ring of Fire"	Johnny Cash	
August 3	"Ring of Fire"	Johnny Cash	
August 10	"Ring of Fire"	Johnny Cash	
August 17	"Ring of Fire"	Johnny Cash	
August 24	"Ring of Fire"	Johnny Cash	
August 31	"Ring of Fire"	Johnny Cash	
September 7	"Ring of Fire"	Johnny Cash	
September 14	"Abilene"	George Hamilton IV	
September 21	"Love's Gonna Live Here"	Buck Owens	
September 28	"Abilene"	George Hamilton IV	
October 5	"Abilene"	George Hamilton IV	
October 12	"Talk Back Trembling Lips"	Ernest Ashworth	
October 19	"Love's Gonna Live Here"	Buck Owens	
October 26	"Love's Gonna Live Here"	Buck Owens	
November 2	"Love's Gonna Live Here"	Buck Owens	
November 9	"Love's Gonna Live Here"	Buck Owens	
November 16	"Love's Gonna Live Here"	Buck Owens	
November 23	"Love's Gonna Live Here"	Buck Owens	
November 30	"Love's Gonna Live Here"	Buck Owens	
December 7	"Love's Gonna Live Here"	Buck Owens	
December 14	"Love's Gonna Live Here"	Buck Owens	
December 21	"Love's Gonna Live Here"	Buck Owens	
December 28	"Love's Gonna Live Here"	Buck Owens	

== See also ==
- Billboard Top Country Singles of 1963
- 1963 in music
- 1963 in country music
- List of artists who reached number one on the U.S. country chart
