= Billboard Top Country Singles of 1963 =

This is a list of Billboard magazine's ranking of the year's top country singles of 1963.

The year's No. 1 country single was "Still" by Bill Anderson. "Act Naturally" by Buck Owens ranked second, and "Ring of Fire" by Johnny Cash ranked third.

Patsy Cline died in March 1963 and had three singles that made the year-end list: "Sweet Dreams (of You)" (No. 23), "Leavin' on Your Mind" (No. 30), and "Faded Love" (No. 31).

Rank	Peak (Note: This column recites the record's peak position on Billboard's weekly charts.)	Title	Artist(s)	Label
1	1	"Still"	Bill Anderson	Decca
2	1	"Act Naturally"	Buck Owens	Capitol
3	1	"Ring of Fire"	Johnny Cash	Columbia
4	3	"We Must Have Been Out of Our Minds"	George Jones and Melba Montgomery	United Artists
5	1	"Lonesome 7-7203"	Hawkshaw Hawkins	King
6	1	"Talk Back Trembling Lips"	Ernest Ashworth	Hickory
7	1	"Abilene"	George Hamilton IV	RCA Victor
8	1	"Don't Let Me Cross Over"	Carl Butler	Columbia
9	2	"Six Days on the Road"	Dave Dudley	Golden Wing
10	5	"You Comb Her Hair"	George Jones	United Artists
11	2	"The End of the World"	Skeeter Davis	RCA Victor
12	3	"Is This Me?"	Jim Reeves	RCA Victor
13	3	"Second-Hand Rose"	Roy Drusky	Decca
14	1	"Ballad of Jed Clampett"	Lester Flatt and Earl Scruggs	Columbia
15	3	"Guilty"	Jim Reeves	RCA Victor
16	2	"Make the World Go Away"	Ray Price	Columbia
17	2	"From a Jack to a King"	Ned Miller	Fabor
18	4	"The Yellow Bandana"	Faron Young	Mercury
19	6	"Detroit City"	Bobby Bare	RCA Victor
20	7	"Not What I Had in Mind"	George Jones	United Artists
21	2	"8 X 10"	Bill Anderson	Decca
22	7	"Walk Me to the Door"	Ray Price	Columbia
23	5	"Sweet Dreams (of You)"	Patsy Cline	Decca
24	5	"T for Texas"	Grandpa Jones	Monument
25	7	"I Take the Chance"	Ernest Ashworth	Hickory
26	1	"Ruby Ann"	Marty Robbins	Columbia
27	6	"Take a Letter, Miss Gray"	Justin Tubb	Groove
28	5	"Hello Trouble"	Orville Couch	Vee Jay
29	4	"Roll Muddy River"	The Wilburn Brothers	Decca
30	8	"Leavin' on Your Mind"	Patsy Cline	Decca
31	7	"Faded Love"	Patsy Cline	Decca
32	7	"Sands of Love"	Webb Pierce	Decca
33	11	"You Took Her Off My Hands (Now Please Take Her Off My Mind)"	Ray Price	Columbia
34	7	"I've Enjoyed as Much of This as I Can Stand"	Porter Wagoner	RCA Victor
35	9	"I'm Saving My Love"	Skeeter Davis	RCA Victor
36	11	"Little Ole You"	Jim Reeves	RCA Victor
37	10	"Tips of My Fingers"	Roy Clark	Capitol
38	5	"Does He Mean That Much to You"	Eddy Arnold	Columbia
39	3	"Sing a Little Song of Heartache"	Rose Maddox	Capitol
40	9	"The Minute You're Gone"	Sonny James	Capitol
41	8	"Mr. Heartache, Move On"	Coleman O'Neal	Chancellor
42	8	"Pearl Pearl Pearl"	Lester Flatt and Earl Scruggs	Columbia
43	11	"Happy to Be Unhappy"	Gary Buck	Petal
44	9	"The Man Who Robbed the Bank at Santa Fe"	Hank Snow	RCA Victor
45	8	"Old Showboat"	Stonewall Jackson	Columbia
46	2	"Mountain of Love"	David Houston	Epic
47	10	"You're for Me"	Buck Owens	Capitol
48	11	"Can't Hang Up the Phone"	Stonewall Jackson	Columbia
49	3	"Thanks a Lot"	Ernest Tubb	Decca
50	10	"Tell Her So"	The Wilburn Brothers	Decca

== See also ==
- List of Hot Country Singles number ones of 1963
- List of Billboard Hot 100 number ones of 1963
- 1963 in country music
