= Billy Hogan =

American singer-songwriter

- Born: October 10, 1933
- Origin: Elkmont, Alabama
- Died: June 6, 1994 (aged 60)
- Occupation: Musician
- Label: Vena
- Formerly of: Ernie Ashworth

Billy Hogan (October 10, 1933 – June 6, 1994) was a singer and songwriter. He was born in Elkmont, Alabama. He recorded several singles for the Vena label in the 1950s. He is remembered for writing Ernie Ashworth's 1962 hit "Each Moment (Spent with You)".
