= Lee Emerson =

Lee Emerson may refer to:

- Lee E. Emerson (1898–1976), governor of Vermont
- Lee Emerson (musician) (died 1978), American country music singer and songwriter
