= Travelin' =

Travelin' may refer to:

- Travelin' (John Lee Hooker album), 1960
- Travelin' (Chet Atkins album), 1963
- Travelin' (Tommy James and the Shondells album), 1970
