= Asleep in the Deep =

Asleesp in the Deep may refer to:

- Asleep in the Deep (Dad's Army), an episode of the British sitcom Dad's Army
- "Asleep in the Deep" (song), by Henry W. Petrie and Arthur J. Lamb
- "Asleep in the Deep", a song by progressive metal band Mastodon from the album Once More 'Round the Sun
- Asleep in the Deep, a 1925 American comedy short film directed by Arvid E. Gillstrom.
