= Wackiki Wabbit =

1943 film by Charles M. Jones

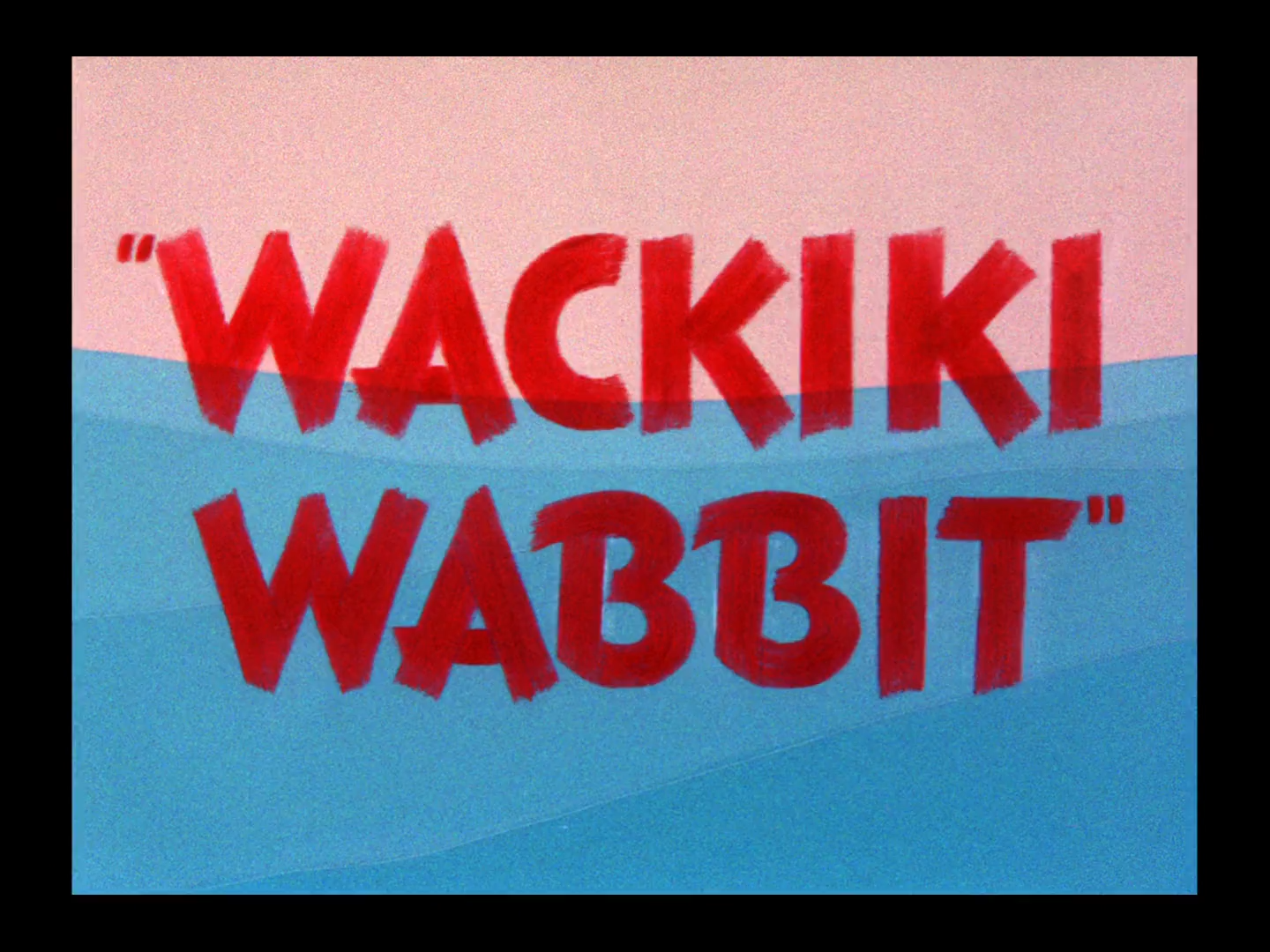
- Title card
- Directed by: Charles M. Jones
- Story by: Tedd Pierce
- Produced by: Leon Schlesinger
- Music by: Carl W. Stalling
- Animation by: Ken Harris
- Color process: Technicolor
- Production company: Leon Schlesinger Productions
- Distributed by: Warner Bros. Pictures
- Release date: July 3, 1943
- Running time: 6 min
- Country: United States
- Language: English

Wackiki Wabbit is a 1943 is a 1943 American animated comedy short film directed by Charles M. Jones. It is part of the Merrie Melodies series and the 22nd cartoon to feature Bugs Bunny. It was released on July 3, 1943.

== Plot ==
The cartoon opens with two castaways adrift on a small raft in the middle of the ocean, underscored with "Asleep in the Deep". Delirious from hunger, they start imagining each other, and even their own limbs, as food. They spot an island in the distance and rush ashore where they meet Bugs Bunny. To his friendly, "What's the good word, strangers?" they answer, "FOOD!" Subsequently, they set up a cooking pot and start chasing after Bugs, as he swings away on a vine.

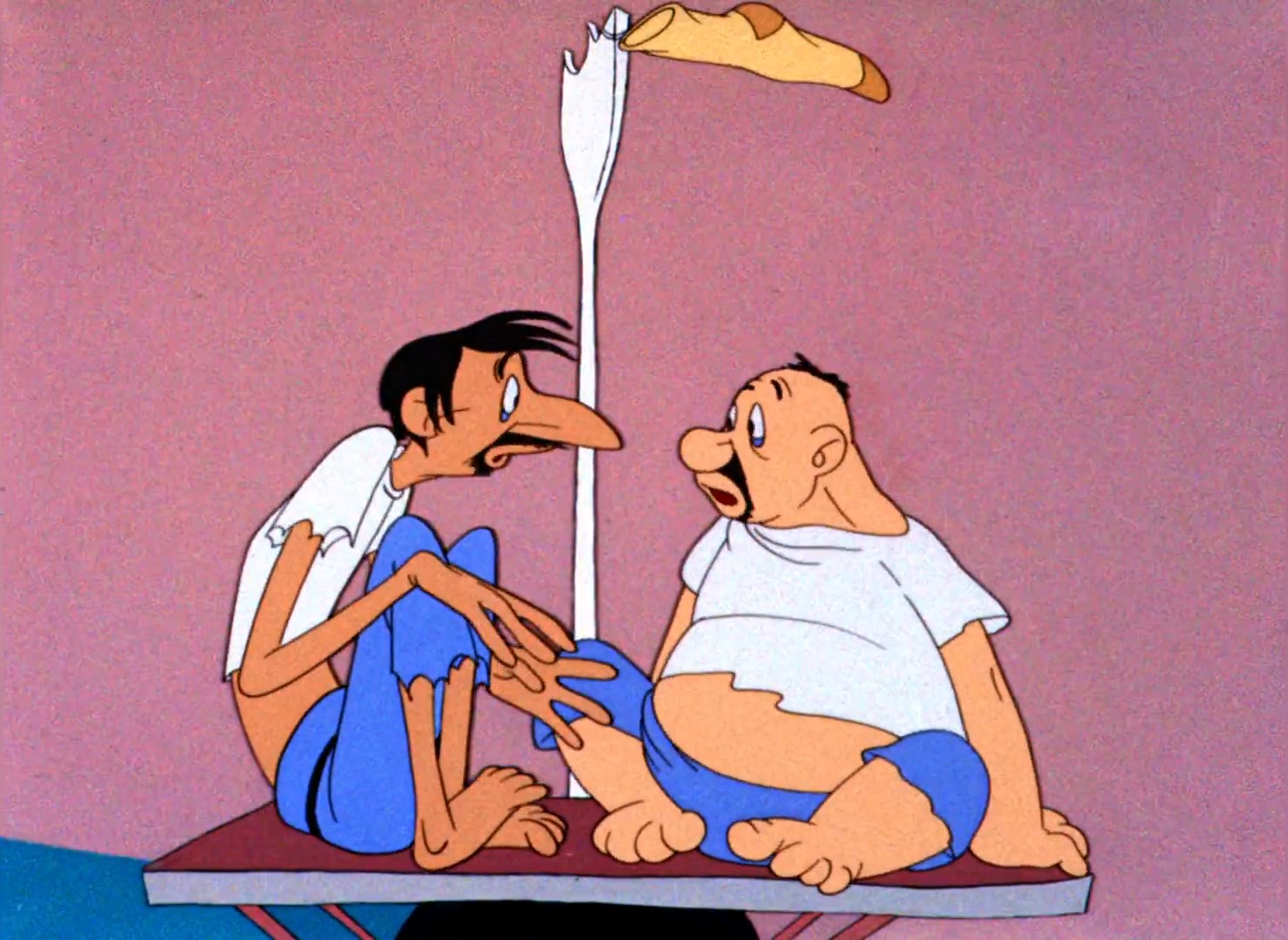
The castaways that Bugs Bunny fights off during the short.

Chasing Bugs through the jungle, the castaways spy him, semi-disguised as an island native, dancing. He welcomes them, "Ah! White men! Welcome to Humuhumunukunukuapua'a'a'a Island." He then speaks in Polynesian-accented nonsense, a long stretch of which is subtitled simply, "What's up, Doc?", and a very short segment of which is subtitled, "Now is the time for every good man to come to the aid of his party."

Bugs then begins a traditional-style dance, punctuated with drumming and chanting. The men join in until the tall, skinny man, seeing Bugs stop and walk away, gives his pal a slap (off-camera) to make him quit. A page in an information booklet is shown to be headed "Native Customs" and goes on to explain that 'The natives are skilled at diving for coins dropped into the water'. The men drop a coin into the cooking pot's boiling water; Bugs dashes in and steals the entire pot.

While Bugs takes a bath in the hot water, the men set up a dining table; the short, fat one bastes the rabbit. They begin singing, "We're gonna have roast rabbit". Bugs sings too, until he realizes he is the roast rabbit and climbs speedily up into a treehouse. He then tricks the castaways by lowering a skinned chicken into the cooking pot. He taunts them with the chicken, using it as a marionette and giving it a voice, in order to make the two think it is somehow alive. The strings eventually tangle and, as Bugs struggles with it, the chicken is actually manipulated to point up, tipping off the men. They yank Bugs from the treehouse; there is an intense, brief struggle and, in the end Bugs escapes with the meat of the chicken.

As the castaways wail in frustration, they hear a steam whistle from a ship. Once the men leap for joy at the prospect of being saved and trot toward the gangplank, Bugs kisses them goodbye and presents them with leis, then pulls his time-honored switcheroo trick and boards the ship himself. The boat pulls out, leaving the two men on the island, waving goodbye to Bugs. Realizing they have been tricked, the skinny man slaps the fat man (again, off-camera) for continuing to shout, "Goodbye!" The two at once imagine each other as a hot dog and a hamburger and chase each other into the distance.

== Home media ==
Wackiki Wabbit is currently in the public domain after United Artists (which absorbed Associated Artists Productions) failed to renew the copyright. The cartoon can be found restored, on Looney Tunes Golden Collection: Volume 3.

== See also ==
- Bugs Bunny filmography
- Looney Tunes and Merrie Melodies filmography (1940–1949)
- List of animated films in the public domain in the United States

Preceded by Jack-Wabbit and the Beanstalk	Bugs Bunny Cartoons; 1943	Succeeded by A Corny Concerto (not part of Bugs Bunny cartoons, but it is a one-shot)
