= The Sacred Aires Quartet =

- Origin: Huntsville, Alabama, United States
- Years active: 1950s-1960s
- Label: Vena

The Sacred Aires Quartet, founded by James Holland, was active in the late 1950s and 1960s. Based in Huntsville, Alabama, the group toured the southeast and performed on programs with the Statesmen Quartet and the Blackwood Brothers. Their first single, on the Vena label, was the last song written by Alton Delmore of the Delmore Brothers.
