= Disney Enchantment =

Nighttime fireworks show at Magic Kingdom

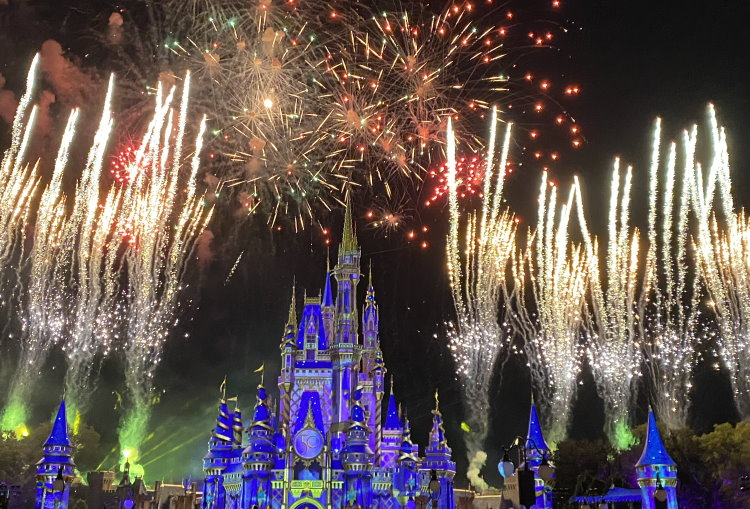

Magic Kingdom
- Status: Operating
- Soft opening date: September 30, 2021
- Opening date: October 1, 2021 (50th Anniversary); January 11, 2024 (Disney After Hours)
- Closing date: April 2, 2023 (50th Anniversary)
- Replaced: Happily Ever After (original)
- Replaced by: Happily Ever After (updated)

Ride statistics
- Attraction type: Multimedia and pyrotechnic show
- Designer: Disney Live Entertainment
- Music: "You Are the Magic" performed by Kayla Alvarez and Phillip Lawrence
- Duration: 15 minutes (original); 18 minutes (updated)
- Sponsor: PANDORA
- Narrator: Angela Bassett
- Show host: Mickey Mouse
- Wheelchair accessible

Disney Enchantment is a fireworks and projection mapping show that debuted at the Magic Kingdom on September 30, 2021, as part of Walt Disney World's 50th anniversary celebration. Similar to its predecessor, Happily Ever After, the show features fireworks, projection mapping, lasers, and searchlights set to Disney music that extend from Cinderella Castle down to Main Street, U.S.A. The music also includes a new original song "You Are the Magic" performed by Phillip Lawrence (who also co-wrote with Davy Nathan) and Kayla Alvarez.

The original version of the show received heavy criticism from guests and fans alike due to a significant lack of the history of Walt Disney World within the show. Given the criticism of the original version, an updated version of the show debuted on August 22, 2022, with a new opening sequence featuring Walt Disney, Roy O. Disney, Mickey Mouse, and classic park attractions.

On September 11, 2022, at the D23, Disney announced that the show's predecessor, Happily Ever After, would return in 2023. Disney later confirmed on January 10, 2023, that Disney Enchantment would play for the final time on April 2, 2023, two days after the end of Walt Disney World's 50th anniversary celebration with Happily Ever After taking back its place the night after. The show has since made limited appearances for Disney After Hours events at the Magic Kingdom from 2024, allowing guests to see it and Happily Ever After concurrently.

== Show summary ==
Introduction

The show begins with an opening fanfare that includes the movement of searchlights across Cinderella Castle and the park hub, ending with two large firework bursts. The narrator welcomes the audience to "a most enchanted kingdom" where "once upon a time, it all began with a dream."

An instrumental version of "When You Wish Upon a Star" plays as historical footage and images from the announcement of Walt Disney World's construction in Florida, including Walt Disney from EPCOT film appear across the castle. A large blueprint canvas is then spread out across the castle, cycling between stylized characters, designs, and music from select attractions:

- Pirates of the Caribbean – Yo Ho (A Pirate's Life for Me)
- It's a Small World – It's a Small World (After All)
- The Haunted Mansion – Grim Grinning Ghosts
- Walt Disney's Carousel of Progress – There's a Great Big Beautiful Tomorrow

After showcasing of the attractions, Roy O. Disney's opening day speech and dedication follows, the castle slowly transforming into its original color scheme to complement its history and Partners statue was illuminated in the segment. As Roy's dedication ends, a large swarm of Mickey-shaped balloons begins to float from beneath the castle, ascending into the sky. Mickey Mouse, holding onto the final set of balloons, appears and lets go of them, leaping down onto the castle balcony and greeting the guests, reminding them that "they are the magic".

As You Are the Magic starts to play, a wishing star on the tallest tower transitions the castle into a deep shade of blue. Swirling pixie dust begins to envelope the castle and turrets, illuminating the trimmings in gold. As wishing star fireworks surround the castle, it soon becomes full of color, while showing silhouette animations of various Disney characters. The silhouette of Cinderella's Fairy Godmother waves her wand, swirling the dust around the central plaza until the Castle becomes a shade of royal purple and gold.

As an instrumental version of The Second Star to the Right plays, the narrator then beckons the audience to "answer the call" of the "magic of dreams come true", telling them that they'll be surprised at what they'll find as long as they believe and let their dream guide them.

Almost There and Just Around the Riverbend

Stylised scenes of characters from Brave, Hercules, Coco, Aladdin, Tangled, and Onward appear, projected onto the castle in various ways.

We Know The Way

Scenes featuring characters from Raya and the Last Dragon and Zootopia are projected onto the castle, accompanied by a spectacular sparkle of fireworks, some resembling Maui's fishhook and the spiral motif seen on the Heart of Te Fiti. The song ends as Judy Hopps walks out of a train and into the foreground, before the projections disappear with a sparkle.

Epiphany

Joe Gardner, seen in "the zone" plays a tune on his piano before an orchestra accompaniment kicks in. As the score progresses, the projections slowly extend onto the buildings of Main Street, U.S.A. with colorful fireworks complementing it. Scenes featuring many characters from a plethora of Disney films appear and disappear intermittently, some designed in the style of former Disney artist Mary Blair, including: Alice in Wonderland, Ratatouille, Lilo & Stitch, Finding Nemo/Finding Dory, Luca, Monsters University, Cars, Wreck-It Ralph, Sleeping Beauty, Lady and the Tramp, The Lion King, Tarzan, Dumbo, Hercules, Big Hero 6, Treasure Planet, WALL-E, and Soul. Unique varieties of fireworks accompany these sections, including cube-shaped and smiley-face ones. The section ends with WALL-E and Eve soaring into the night sky, represented by two large white shells as they leave the projection radius.

Songs featured: "Be Our Guest", "Under the Sea", "You've Got a Friend in Me", "The Silly Song", "I've Got No Strings", "A Whole New World", and "You Can Fly".

Into the Unknown

As a rock variation of Into the Unknown plays, many scenes from Disney films showcasing characters in perilous situations are projected onto the castle, appearing inside various "portals". The song ends as Elsa appears, shooting blasts of ice off in different directions around the castle. Films featured include Zootopia, Aladdin, Brave, Inside Out, Coco, The Little Mermaid, Beauty and the Beast, Alice in Wonderland, Onward, and Frozen II.

Night on Bald Mountain

As the previous projection ends, shattering into fragments of ice, a lightning bolt strikes as a combined rock and instrumental version of Night on Bald Mountain from Fantasia plays, leading into a segment highlighting many Disney characters fighting their respective villains and their associates. Many scenes appear from the following films, such as: Frozen II, Beauty and the Beast, Inside Out, Coco, Tangled, Sleeping Beauty, Hercules, Onward, Mulan, Cinderella, Raya and the Last Dragon, and Moana.

I Am Moana

The chaos of the previous scene slowly fades away, leaving a period of silence for a moment before a poignant, gentle reprise of I Am Moana plays. The characters, rebounding from their battles, slowly realize "nothing…can silence the quiet voice still inside (them)." As Moana restores the heart of Te Fiti to the center of the castle, the entire span of the castle and buildings are restored, and the music crescendos into a triumphant melody as joyful scenes of Disney characters achieving their goals appear, with a triumphant finale of fireworks at the end, letting the audience know that "the call isn't out there at all, it's inside (them)." Includes scenes from: Onward, Coco, Tangled, Cinderella, Mulan, Hercules, and The Princess and the Frog.

Finale

The narrator returns to intone that the Magic Kingdom will continue to serve as "a beacon to those with a wish in their heart", reminding all who enter that "anything is possible" with the magic within themselves. A pixie begins to fly from the center of the castle and up to the tallest tower. It's revealed to be Tinker Bell, sprinkling her pixie dust over the castle and Main Street, transforming them into gold.

The reprise of You Are the Magic plays, crescendoing in a beautiful array of fireworks and lights. Mickey Mouse walks out onto the castle balcony once more, amazed at the display, before bidding the audience goodbye.

== Voice cast ==
- Angela Bassett – Narrator
- Philip Lawrence – Performer ("You Are the Magic" theme song)
- Kayla Alvarez – Performer ("You Are the Magic" theme song)
- Bret Iwan – Mickey Mouse (revamped version)
- Walt Disney – himself (archival recording; revamped version)
- Roy O. Disney – himself (archival recording; revamped version)
- James W. Rouse – himself (archival recording; revamped version)

== Critical reception ==
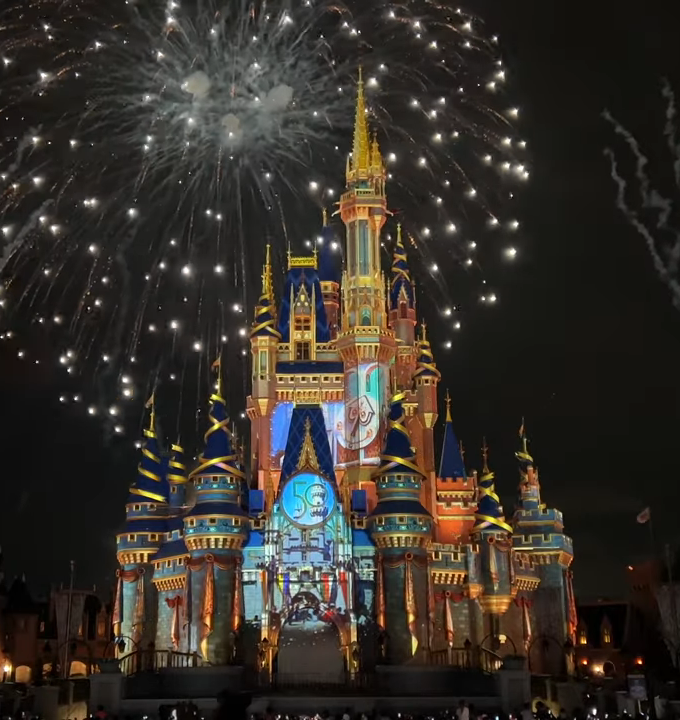
Sleeping Beauty Castle and It's a Small World projected on Cinderella Castle at the beginning of Disney Enchantment.

The original version of the show received mixed to negative reviews; some praised it for its technological advancements while others criticized it for not being focused on the attractions past and present of Walt Disney World, Disney movies, or the 50th anniversary of Walt Disney World, when it debuted. It was also noted for not having much of a "story element."

The general consensus was that the original version of the show was not an improvement over Happily Ever After, with some reviewers calling the original Disney Enchantment a "bootleg" version and opining that it "fails as a successor."

After Disney Enchantment was revamped to include nostalgic elements of Walt Disney World's history, the updated show received mostly positive reviews from visitors, as while the new additions to the show truly celebrate Walt Disney's vision and 50 years of the Walt Disney World Resort, some argue that the changes could have been implemented sooner.

== Limited return ==
On October 24, 2023, Disney Parks announced the return of Disney Enchantment in a limited role, running during separately ticketed after-hours events taking place in the Magic Kingdom beginning from 2024. The performance of Enchantment will be in addition to the scheduled performance of Happily Ever After at the conclusion of the park's regular operating hours. The show also returned for future after-hours events for 2025 and 2026 respectively (January 6 to May 19 for 2025 events and January 12 to July 27 for 2026 events).

== See also ==
- Together Forever – A Pixar Nighttime Spectacular
