= Irma Jackson =

1972 song by Merle Haggard

"Irma Jackson" is a song by Bakersfield, California-based country music artist Merle Haggard, released on his 1972 album Let Me Tell You About a Song. The song, which was about the then-controversial topic of an interracial romance, was actually written several years prior to 1972, but not released at first because Capitol Records thought it would hurt Haggard's image at the time. Fellow country singer Tony Booth recorded a cover version of "Irma Jackson" in 1970, which was released as his first single for MGM Records. Booth's version of the song charted at #67 on the Hot Country Songs chart.

== Musical structure ==
"Irma Jackson" is in the key of C major and features an AABAB musical structure, with the first two verses played back-to-back, then a chorus, then the third verse, and finally another chorus. The song's running time is 2 minutes and 56 seconds.

The song's guitar chords are C-G^{7}-C in the verses, and F-G^{7}-C in the choruses.

== Lyrics ==
In the song, the narrator expresses his love for his sweetheart Irma Jackson, but also acknowledges that she "can't be mine" because "there's no way the world will understand that love is colorblind". He also points out that no one cared when the two of them were childhood friends, but now that they are grown up, the world "draws a line" and won't let them be together because they are of different races. Eventually, Irma herself decides to leave the narrator, but he proclaims that he will always love her "'till I die".

== Reception ==
According to American Songwriter, "some conservatives who had flocked to 'Okie' were shocked by 'Irma Jackson', Haggard's pro-tolerance take on interracial romance", but Haggard was "unfazed" by this. Haggard said that he and Johnny Cash both believed strongly in freedom of speech. Haggard had earlier recorded a cover of "Go Home", a song by Tommy Collins with a similar theme.
