= Justin Tubb =

American singer-songwriter

Background information
- Born: Justin Wayne Tubb; August 20, 1935; San Antonio, Texas, U.S.
- Died: January 24, 1998 (aged 62) Goodlettsville, Tennessee, U.S.
- Genre: Country
- Occupation: Singer-songwriter
- Instrument: Guitar
- Years active: 1954–1981
- Labels: Decca, Groove, RCA

Justin Wayne Tubb (August 20, 1935 – January 24, 1998) was an American country music singer and songwriter. Born in San Antonio, Texas, United States, he was the oldest son of country singer Ernest Tubb, known for popular songs like "Walking the Floor Over You".

== Biography ==
By 1954, Tubb made it on the country chart with two duets with Goldie Hill—("Looking Back to See" and "Sure Fire Kisses"). A year later, at age 20, he was made a member of the Grand Ole Opry. Tubb had a few recordings of his own that enjoyed success, including "I Gotta Go Get My Baby" and "Take a Letter Miss Gray", but he was more successful as a songwriter. He penned many hit songs for other performers, including "Keeping Up With the Joneses", "Love Is No Excuse", "Imagine That" for Patsy Cline, and "Lonesome 7-7203", a hit for Hawkshaw Hawkins. Ultimately, six of his songs won awards. In the late 1950s, he roomed with a young, up-and-coming songwriter named Roger Miller.

During the 1960s, Tubb worked with his father on various business projects. Toward the end of his own life, he completed an album of duets with his father, using recordings Ernest had made before his death. The album, Just You and Me Daddy (1999), was released after Justin Tubb died in Nashville on January 24, 1998.

His wife was Carolyn McPherson Tubb.

== Singles ==
| Year | Single | US Country |
|---|---|---|
| 1954 | "Looking Back to See" (with Goldie Hill) | 4 |
| 1955 | "Sure Fire Kisses" (with Goldie Hill) | 11 |
| 1955 | "I Gotta Go Get My Baby" | 8 |
| 1963 | "Take a Letter, Miss Gray" | 6 |
| 1965 | "Hurry, Mr. Peters" (with Lorene Mann) | 23 |
| 1966 | "We've Gone Too Far, Again" (with Lorene Mann) | 44 |
| 1967 | "But Wait There's More" | 63 |

== Albums ==
- Country Boy in Love (1957)
- Star of the Grand Ole Opry (1962)
- The Modern Country Western Sound of Justin Tubb (1963)
- Where You're Concerned (1965)
- Justin Tubb & Lorene Mann (1966)
- That Country Style (1967)
- Things I Still Remember Very Well (1969)
- A New Country Heard From (1974)
- Justin Tubb (1981)
- Justin Tubb (1985)
- Just You and Me Daddy (1999)
