= WSLV =

- Ardmore, Tennessee; United States
- Broadcast area: Southern Giles County, Tennessee; Southern Lincoln County, Tennessee; Northern Limestone County, Alabama; Northern Madison County, Alabama
- Frequency: 1110 kHz
- Branding: Outlaw 96.5

Programming
- Format: Country

Ownership
- Owner: Michael Brandt; (Southern Broadcasting LLC)

History
- First air date: September 1968
- Former call signs: WSLV (1968–2006); DWSLV (2006–2007)

Technical information
- Licensing authority: FCC
- Facility ID: 3425
- Class: D
- Power: 2,500 watts day 1,000 watts critical hours
- Transmitter coordinates: 34°59′35.0″N 86°51′22.0″W
- Translators: 96.5 W243EP (Madison, Alabama); 105.1 W286DF (Athens, Alabama)

Links
- Public license information: Public file; LMS
- Webcast: Listen Live

WSLV (1110 AM) is a country music formatted broadcast radio station licensed to Ardmore, Tennessee, serving Southern Giles and Southern Lincoln counties in Tennessee and Northern Limestone and Northern Madison counties in Alabama. WSLV is owned and operated by Michael Brandt, through licensee Southern Broadcasting LLC.

== History ==
WSLV was previously owned by country musician and longtime Grand Ole Opry member Ernie Ashworth.

In April 2020, WSLV changed formats from variety to country, branded as “Outlaw 96.5”.
