= The Guitar Genius =

- Cover of the original 1963 LP

Studio album by Chet Atkins
- Released: 1963
- Studio: RCA 'Nashville Sound' Studios, Nashville, TN
- Genre: Country, pop, rock
- Length: 24:42
- Label: RCA Camden
- Producer: Chet Atkins

Chet Atkins chronology
Teen Scene (1963)	The Guitar Genius (1963)	Travelin' (1963)

Unissued LP
- Cover for the unreleased My Brother Sings, recorded in 1958

The Guitar Genius is the twenty-second studio album by American guitarist Chet Atkins, released in 1963. It was reissued on CD in 1999. It was also reissued on CD along with And His Guitar in 2004. Five vocal tracks by Atkins' brother Jim were from an unreleased 1958 album to be titled My Brother Sings. That album was later released by Sundazed Music with the original RCA Victor cover art and label in 2015.

== Background ==
In 1958, Atkins decided to record an album with his brother Jim, once a vocalist in the Les Paul Trio and for Fred Waring and His Pennsylvanians. The album was recorded July 24 and August 29, 1958 in Nashville and was to be called My Brother Sings. It was completed, printed and pressed before being pulled from distribution for unknown reasons. All copies of the album were to be destroyed. Four of the instrumentals that were recorded appeared on the Atkins' 1959 album Mister Guitar. Five of Jim Atkins' vocal tracks were released on The Guitar Genius on the budget label Camden in 1963. Rare copies of the original album were discovered in the hands of collectors. The backing band was credited as The Rhythm Rockers, which consisted of session musicians Bob Moore, Floyd Cramer and Buddy Harman. In 1963, five of the Jim Atkins vocal tracks were issued along with five instrumentals by Chet. In 2015, My Brother Sings was released by Sundazed Music after the location of the original tapes and remastering.

== Reception ==
Professional ratings
Review scores
Source	Rating
Allmusic	3.5/5 stars

Writing for Allmusic, music critic Bruce Eder wrote of the album "The Guitar Genius is one strange album—good, but strange—beginning with its title. Of course there's plenty of guitar here, but there's also a surprising number of pieces that rely on vocals... this album is somewhat of a very mixed stylistic bag..."

== Track listing ==
=== Side one ===
1. "Heartbreak Hotel" (Tommy Durden, Mae Boren Axton, Elvis Presley) – 2:28
2. "Swanee River" (Stephen Foster) – 1:41
3. "Blackjack" (John D. Loudermilk) – 2:27
4. "I'll Be With You in Apple Blossom Time" (Albert Von Tilzer, Neville Fleeson) – 2:11
5. "Daar's 'N Wind Wat Waat" (Nico Carstens) – 2:28

=== Side two ===
1. "It's Now or Never" (Wally Gold, Aaron Schroeder, Eduardo di Capua) – 2:05
2. "Out of Nowhere" ( Johnny Green, Edward Heyman) – 3:02
3. "Hidden Charm" (Willie Dixon, James Rich) – 2:32
4. "Even Tho'" (Willie Jones, Webb Pierce) – 3:18
5. "When Day Is Done" (Buddy DeSylva, Robert Katscher) – 2:30

== My Brother Sings track listing ==
=== Side one ===
1. "Swanee River" (Stephen Foster) – 1:41
2. "Country Style" (Johnny Burke, Jimmy Van Heusen)
3. "Out of Nowhere" ( Johnny Green, Edward Heyman) – 3:02
4. "Slinky" (Chet Atkins)
5. "In Apple Blossom Time" (Albert Von Tilzer, Neville Fleeson) – 2:11
6. "Zing Went The Strings Of My Heart" (James F. Hanley)

=== Side two ===
1. "I'm Forever Blowing Bubbles" (John Kellette, James Kendis, James Brockman, Nat Vincent)
2. "Asleep In The Deep" (Arthur J. Lamb, Henry W. Petrie)
3. "My Funny Valentine" (Richard Rodgers, Lorenz Hart)
4. "When Day Is Done" (Buddy DeSylva, Robert Katscher) – 2:30
5. "Even Tho'" (Willie Jones, Webb Pierce) – 3:18
6. "I Know That You Know" (Anne Caldwell, Vincent Youmans)

== Personnel ==
- Chet Atkins – guitar
- Jim Atkins – vocals on "Swannee River", "Blackjack", "Out of Nowhere", "When Day is Done", "Even Tho'"
- Bob Moore – bass
- Floyd Cramer – piano
- Jim Carney – drums

Production

- Chet Atkins – producer
- Bob Farris – engineer
- Kevin Gray – remastering
