= Pirates of the Caribbean (1966 soundtrack) =

Walt Disney's Pirates of the Caribbean: The Sound Track of the Fabulous Adventure

Soundtrack album by George Bruns
- Released: 1966
- Label: Disneyland Records

Pirates of the Caribbean chronology
Walt Disney's Pirates of the Caribbean (1966)	The Curse of the Black Pearl (2003)

Walt Disney's Pirates of the Caribbean: The Sound Track of the Fabulous Adventure, or simply Walt Disney's Pirates of the Caribbean (Disneyland Records ST-3937) was the first soundtrack album from the original Disneyland attraction. The first side features the story of the attraction narrated by Thurl Ravenscroft and the second side has several seafaring tunes sung by Ravenscroft.

== Track listing ==
1. "Pirates of the Caribbean Adventure" (narration)
2. "Yo Ho (A Pirate's Life for Me)"
3. "A Life on the Ocean Waves"
4. "Asleep In the Deep"
5. "A Capital Ship"
6. "Shenandoah"
7. "Tarpaulin Jacket"
