= Yo Ho (A Pirate's Life for Me) =

Song

from the album Walt Disney's Pirates Of The Caribbean
- Released: 1967
- Genre: Theme song
- Length: 1:03
- Label: Walt Disney
- Composer: George Bruns
- Lyricist: Xavier Atencio

"Yo Ho (A Pirate's Life for Me)" is the theme song for the Pirates of the Caribbean attractions at Disney theme parks. The music was written by George Bruns, with lyrics by Xavier Atencio. The version heard at Disneyland and Walt Disney World's Magic Kingdom was sung by the Mellomen, featuring Thurl Ravenscroft.

== Versions ==
- 1992: The song was parodied in a promotional spot for the Disney Afternoon series, TaleSpin, as sung by Don Karnage and the Air Pirates.
- 1996: The Pointer Sisters recorded a cover version for the album Disney's Music from the Park.
- 2002: The song is featured briefly in the Disney film Treasure Planet. The robot B.E.N. (Martin Short) sings a few bars while aboard the RLS Legacy.
- 2003: The song is featured in the Disney film Pirates of the Caribbean: The Curse of the Black Pearl. A few bars are sung by young Elizabeth Swann (Lucinda Dryzek) in the film's opening. An older Elizabeth (Keira Knightley) later teaches it to Captain Jack Sparrow (Johnny Depp) while they are marooned on an island. As according to her plan, Jack Sparrow falls drunk and she is able to destroy the rum. Later, when Captain Jack Sparrow once again becomes captain of the Black Pearl, he sings it, astonished that he remembered it.
- 2005: The teaser trailer Pirates of the Caribbean: Dead Man's Chest opened with archived audio of young Elizabeth singing the song.
- 2006: A version is sung by the Jonas Brothers in DisneyMania 4; the refrain "Drink up me hearties" is replaced with "Stand up me hearties".
- 2007: As with Dead Man's Chest, archive audio of young Elizabeth singing the song played at the opening of the teaser trailer for Pirates of the Caribbean: At World's End. The instrumentals and dialogue from the attraction are heard as well in the fade to black after the descent over the waterfall of World's End. A few bars of the song are sung again near the end of the film by Jack Sparrow, and after the credits by the son of Elizabeth.
- 2010: Disney's World of Color show briefly plays the song prior to the main Pirates of the Caribbean segment.
- 2011: The lyrics serve as part of Jack Sparrow's last line in Pirates of the Caribbean: On Stranger Tides, "It's a pirate's life for me. Savvy?"
- 2011: Brian Wilson covered it in a medley on his album In the Key of Disney, which was released on October 25, 2011.
- 2013: An oregon version of the song can be heard in the mobile game Where’s my Water as a bonus song in the Allie’s Story DLC
- 2017: The song was featured in the teaser trailer for the film Pirates of the Caribbean: Dead Men Tell No Tales.
- 2018: Celebrate! Tokyo Disneyland briefly features the song prior to the main Pirates of the Caribbean theme in Adventureland section.
- 2019: A version with alternate lyrics is featured in the video game Kingdom Hearts III in a level based on Pirates of the Caribbean: At World's End. It is used to catch players up on the story of the previous film Pirates of the Caribbean: Dead Man's Chest.
- 2021: A playable shanty version was added to the video game Sea of Thieves during their Season 3 launch on June 22, 2021, which brought the world and characters of Pirates of the Caribbean to the game.
- 2022: Disney Enchantment fireworks show briefly plays the song as part of the revamped version of the show that features the attraction segments.

== Pop culture ==
=== Sports ===
- 1994: In NHL 95, when the Mighty Ducks of Anaheim are at home, a stadium organ version of the song is played during the opening faceoff of each period. This is a reference to Disney owning the team at the time.
- 2007–????: NFL's Tampa Bay Buccaneers have a pirate ship in the north end zone of Raymond James Stadium. During football games, they play the song over the loudspeakers and jumbotron (courtesy of Disney), at which time patrons on the ship throw beads and other prizes into the crowd.

=== Other ===
- 1982: Orange County punk band The Vandals use the song's melody briefly in their song "Pirate's Life", which is about riding the attraction under the influence of LSD
- 1986: Singer/songwriter Jimmy Buffett uses the melody as the opening to his single "Take It Back" which was written for the US America's Cup yachting team.
- 1986: Quick Nibble, a disk copy program for the Amiga computer, plays a sample of the song on its title screen.
- 1994: An instrumental version appears on guitarist Buckethead's album Giant Robot.
- 2013: Smosh covered it in the Assassin's Creed 4 rock anthem video.
- 2022: In Return to Monkey Island, Guybrush sings a line from the song after finding out his work conditions as a swabbie.
- 2022: In Season 3 of For All Mankind, the NASA crew plays the song over a radio call to a rival crew after unfurling a solar sail.
