= Vena Records =

- Founded: 1950
- Country of origin: United States
- Location: Madison, Alabama

Vena Records was an American record label located in Madison, Alabama in the late 1950s. Three singles are thought to have been released by the label.

== Singles ==
=== Marlon "Madman" Mitchell and the Rocketeers ===
- "Bermuda Shorts" / "Ice Cold Baby" (1957)

Both songs were written by Billy Hogan.

=== Billy Hogan and The Twilighters ===
- "Shake It Over Sputnik" / "I Don't Want Anything But Your Love" (1958)

Both songs were written by Billy Hogan.

=== The Sacred-Aires Quartet ===
- "I Can't Be Satisfied" / "We're Sailing Along" (1960)

Performed by The Sacred Aires Quartet, side one was written by Alton Delmore, probably the last song he wrote. Side two was written by James Holland. The piano player on the session was David Vest.

== See also ==
- List of record labels
- Madison, Alabama
