= Each Moment (Spent with You) =

"Each Moment (Spent With You)"

Single by Ernest Ashworth
- B-side: "Night Time Is Cry Time"
- Released: April 1960
- Genre: Country
- Length: 2:33
- Label: Decca
- Songwriter(s): Billy Hogan

Ernest Ashworth singles chronology
"Each Moment (Spent With You)" (1960)	"You Can't Pick a Rose in December" (1960)

"Each Moment (Spent With You)" was a country song written by Billy Hogan. It was a top 5 hit in the US for Ernie Ashworth in 1960.

== Chart performance ==
Chart (1960)	Peak position
U.S. Billboard Hot Country Singles	4
