= Our Man in Nashville =

Studio album by Chet Atkins
- Released: December 1962
- Recorded: Nashville, TN
- Genre: Country, pop, jazz
- Label: RCA Victor LSP-2616 (Stereo)
- Producer: Anita Kerr

Chet Atkins chronology
Caribbean Guitar (1962)	Our Man in Nashville (1962)	Teen Scene (1963)

Our Man in Nashville is the twentieth studio album by American guitarist Chet Atkins, released in 1963. RCA did a series of "Our Man in ..." and Chet was indeed their man in Nashville. He was producing and developing the "Nashville sound".

The album is primarily notable for featuring Atkins's first recordings of instrumentals composed by Jerry Reed. During the next thirty-two years Reed provided Atkins with more than thirty original guitar compositions.

The album reached No. 135 on the Billboard's Top albums chart, during a five-week stay on it.

Our Man in Nashville is out of print.

== Reception ==
Professional ratings
Review scores
Source	Rating
Allmusic	3.5/5 stars
New Record Mirror	4/5 stars

Writing for Allmusic, critic Richard S. Ginell wrote of the album "Chester remains his usual unclassifiable self, dealing out the country picking, smooth easy listening guitar, jazz, and even some very mild rock & roll on this session, with some overdubbed strings discreetly decorating a few tracks... And, as on so many Atkins albums, there is at least one track that one can develop a guilty addiction to for no particular reason; here, it's the happy-go-lucky "Always on Saturday.""

== Track listing ==
=== Side one ===
1. "Scare Crow" (Jerry Reed) – 2:19
2. "Alexander's Ragtime Band" (Irving Berlin)
3. "Melissa" (Tupper Saussy) – 2:16
4. "Goodnight Irene" (Lead Belly, Alan Lomax) – 2:41
5. "Old Double Shuffle" (John D. Loudermilk) – 2:58
6. "Down Home" (Jerry Reed) – 2:03

=== Side two ===
1. "Always on Saturday" (Cy Coben) – 2:10
2. "Drown in My Own Tears" (Henry Glover) – 2:14
3. "Spanish Harlem" (Jerry Leiber, Phil Spector) – 2:53
4. "Streamlined Cannonball" (Roy Acuff) – 2:35
5. "House in New Orleans" (Traditional; arranged by Chet Atkins) – 2:13
6. "A Little Bitty Tear" (Hank Cochran) – 2:31

== Personnel ==
- Chet Atkins – guitar

== Charts ==
Chart (1963)	Peak position
US Billboard Top Albums	135
US Cashbox Top Albums (Monoraul)	70
