= Teen Scene =

- Cover of the original 1963 LP

Studio album by Chet Atkins
- Released: 1963
- Recorded: RCA 'Nashville Sound' Studios, Nashville, TN
- Genre: Country; pop; rock
- Length: 26:29
- Label: RCA Victor LSP-2719 (stereo), LPM-2719 (mono)
- Producer: Anita Kerr

Chet Atkins chronology
| Our Man in Nashville (1962) | Teen Scene (1963) | The Guitar Genius (1963) |

Pickwick reissue cover
- LP cover of 1975 Teen Scene reissue

Professional ratings
Review scores
| Source | Rating |
|---|---|
| AllMusic | 2/5 stars |

Teen Scene is the twenty-first studio album by American guitarist Chet Atkins, released in 1963. It was nominated for a Grammy Award in 1964 for Best Rock and Roll Recording but did not win. It reached No. 93 on the Billboard albums chart. The album was reissued in 1975 on the Pickwick budget label.

== Track listing ==
=== Side one ===
1. "I Got a Woman" (Ray Charles, Richard) – 2:20
2. "Rumpus" (Shurelon J. Jones) – 2:03
3. "I Love How You Love Me" (Barry Mann, Larry Kolber) – 2:00
4. "Alley Cat" (Frank Bjorn) – 2:19
5. "Walk Right In" (Gus Cannon, Hosea Woods) – 2:08
6. "(Back Home Again in) Indiana" (James Hanley, Ballard MacDonald) – 2:16

=== Side two ===
1. "Teen Scene" (Atkins, Jerry Reed) – 1:56
2. "Sweetie Baby" (Roye Lee, Chet Rose) – 2:19
3. "Little Evil" (Jerry Snook) – 1:57
4. "I Will" (Dick Glasser) – 2:30
5. "Bye Bye Birdie" (Lee Adams, Charles Strouse) – 2:27
6. "Susie Q" (Eleanor Broadwater, Dale Hawkins, Stan Lewis) – 2:14

== Personnel ==
- Chet Atkins – guitar
- Bill Porter – engineer

== Charts ==
| Chart (1963) | Peak position |
|---|---|
| US Billboard Top LP's | 93 |
| US Cash Box Top 100 Albums (Monaural) | 68 |
