= Henry W. Petrie =

American composer

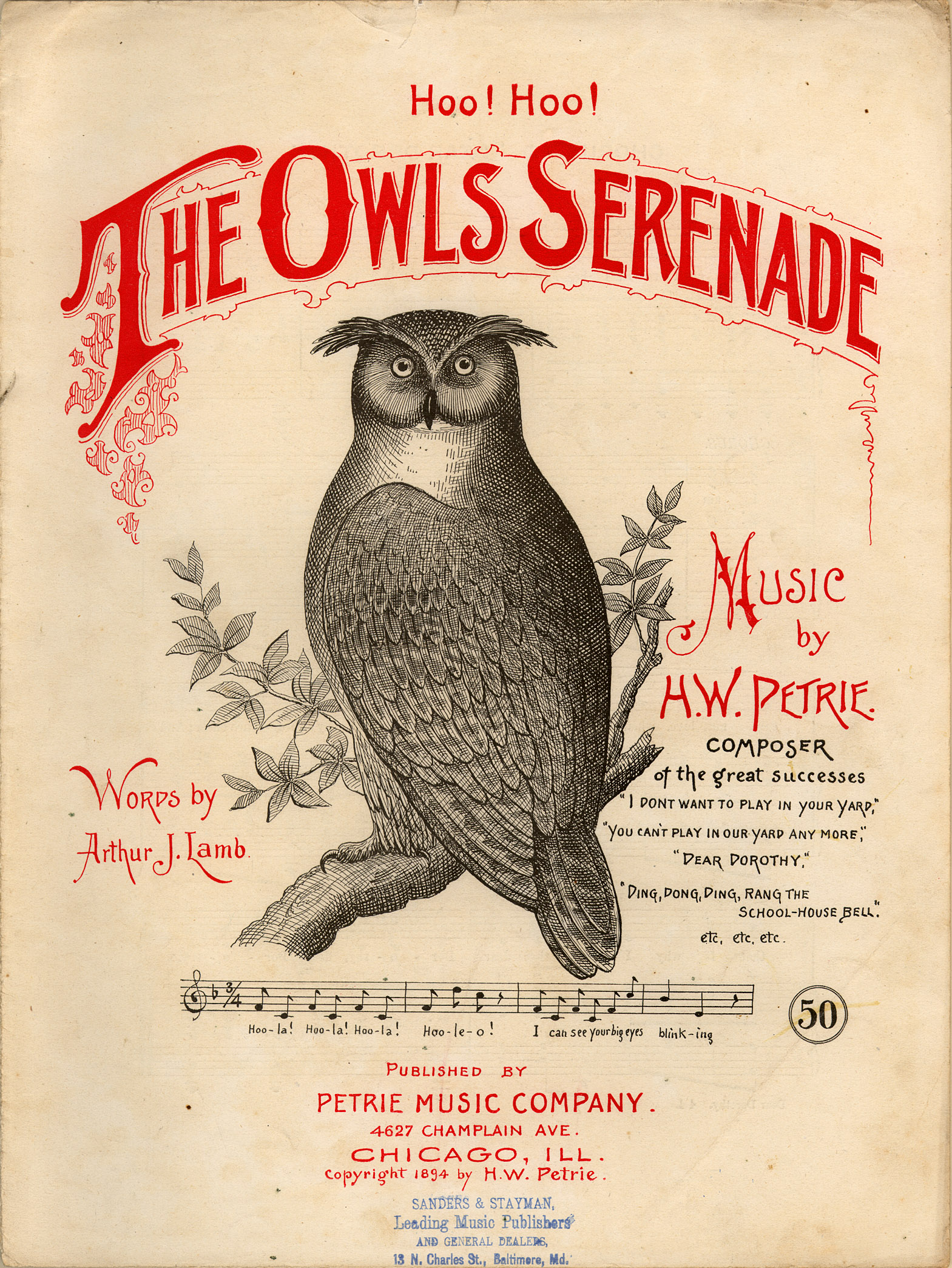
"The Owls Serenade" with music by H. W. Petrie, 1894 sheet music cover

Henry W. Petrie (March 4, 1857 - May 25, 1925) was an American composer and performer of popular music. Petrie was born in Bloomington, Illinois and died in Paw Paw, Michigan.

== Songs ==
- "I Don't Want To Play In Your Yard" with Philip Wingate (1894)
- "Jonah and the Whale" w. Wingate Black (1894).
- "The Owls Serenade" w. Arthur J. Lamb (1894)
- "Asleep in the Deep" w. Arthur J. Lamb (1897)
- "Davy Jones' Locker" (1901)
- "Where The Sunset Turns The Ocean's Blue To Gold" with Eva Fern Buckner (1902)
- "In a Peach-basket Hat Made for Two" w. James M. Reilly (1909).
- "When The Twilight Comes To Kiss The Rose "Good-Night"" with Robert F. Roden (1912)
- While The Stars In The Heavens Shine On" w. Harry D. Kerr (1914)
