= Asleep in the Deep (song) =

Song composed by Henry W. Petrie

Asleep In The Deep
- Song by Henry W. Petrie
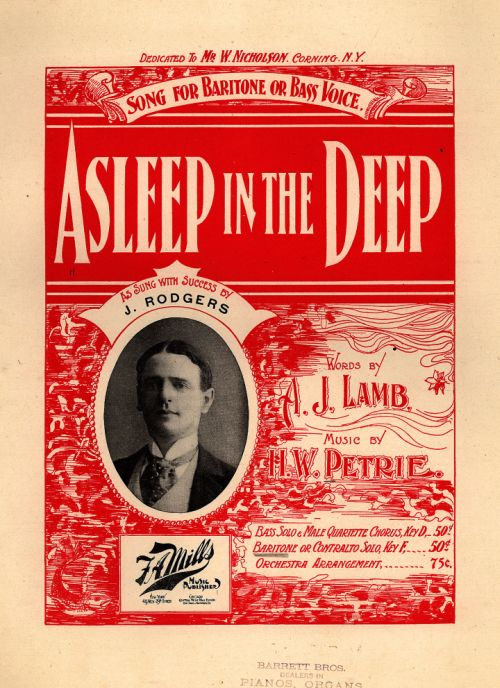
- Cover, sheet music, 1897
- Genre: Folk song, sea shanty
- Text: Arthur J. Lamb
- Language: English
- Published: 1897

Audio sample
- Recording of Asleep in the Deep, performed by J. W. Myers (1908): file; help

"Asleep in the Deep" is a song written by Arthur J. Lamb and composed by Henry W. Petrie in 1897. It is titled after a refrain at the end of the song. The phrase "asleep in the deep" refers to those who have drowned. The lyrics allude to those who have met such a fate while at sea.

Stormy the night and the waves roll high, bravely the ship doth ride; Hark!
While the lighthouse bell's solemn cry rings o'er the sullen tide.
There on the deck see two lovers stand, heart to heart beating and hand in hand,
Though death be near, she knows no fear, while at her side is the one ever dear.

Loudly the bell in the old tower rings
Bidding us list to the warning it brings.
Sailor take care! Sailor take care!
Danger is near thee, beware! Beware!
Beware! Beware!

Many brave hearts are asleep in the deep so beware! Beware!
What of the storm when the night is o'er? There is no trace or sign!
Save where the wreckage hath strewn the shore, peaceful the sun doth shine.
But when the wild raging storm did cease, under the billows two hearts found peace.
No more to part, no more of pain, the bell may now toll its warning in vain.

Loudly the bell in the old tower rings
Biding us list to the warning it brings.
Sailor take care! Sailor take care!
Danger is near thee, beware! Beware!
Beware! Beware!

Many brave hearts are asleep in the deep so beware! Beware!
Many brave hearts are asleep in the deep so beware! Beware!

== In popular culture ==
- A German version of the song was composed on verses of Martell under the title "Des Seemanns Los" (The Sailor's Fate).
- The song has been recorded by J. W. Myers (1902), Frank Stanley (1907), Gus Reed (Edison Records, 1908), Wilfred Glenn (1913), Al Jolson (1916), Charles Laird (1920), The Mills Brothers (1939), Coleman Hawkins (1940), Pete Daily's Chicagoans (1952), Firehouse Five Plus Two (1957), The Dukes of Dixieland (1958), Bill Cullen's Minstrel Spectacular (1959), Chet Atkins (My Brother Sings, 1959), Bing Crosby (101 Gang Songs, 1961), Thurl Ravenscroft (Walt Disney's Pirates of the Caribbean, 1966), and Turk Murphy's Jazz Band (1973).
- The song features in Buster Keaton's film The Navigator (1924).
- The 1928 song "Ever Since the Movies Learned to Talk" includes the lyric:

When the hero sings 'Asleep in the Deep',
He sounds just like Little Bo Peep!
Ever since the movies learned to talk.

- Norman Chaney, as Chubby, performs a lip-synched version of the song sung by Charley Chase in the 1931 Our Gang film Little Daddy.
- An excerpt of the lyrics is sung by Goofy in the 1937 American animated short film Clock Cleaners produced by Walt Disney. As Goofy is washing the bell of the clocktower, he repeatedly sings "Loudly the bell in the old tower rings". Another example is from the 1937 short film Mickey's Amateurs, in which through the introductory credits, Pete's voice sings the same excerpt before the scene opens on the ring of the gong, signifying rejection, though Pete persistently repeats the excerpt while the mechanical hands pull him off the stage.
- The song is the background at the beginning of the Warner Brothers' Merrie Melodies cartoon Wackiki Wabbit (1943) while the two shipwrecked sailors are adrift.
- The song is featured in the Little Golden Books title "The Little Boy with a Big Horn" by Jack Bechdolt (1950).
- The song is widely used as a running cameo in The Adventures of Rocky and Bullwinkle and Friends, usually with the excerpt "Many brave hearts are asleep in the deep, so beware, beware".
- The first few lines, referred to as "Stormy the Night" are sung in Act 2, Scene 16 of Aufstieg und Fall der Stadt Mahagonny by Bertolt Brecht and Kurt Weill.
