= Jim Denny (Opry manager) =

American music executive

James Rae Denney (later Denny; 28 February 1911 – 27 August 1963) was an American executive in the country music recording and broadcasting industry in the 1940s and '50s. He was head of the Artists Service Bureau for powerful Nashville-based radio station WSM beginning in 1946, served as general manager of the Grand Ole Opry, and launched Cedarwood Publishing Company with country star Webb Pierce in 1954. Upon his 1966 posthumous induction, Denny was the first non-musician to be named into the Country Music Hall of Fame.

== Early life and education ==
On 28 February 1911, Denny was born in Silver Point, Tennessee, and raised alongside two brothers. At the beginning of the 1920s, Denny moved to Nashville, Tennessee and worked as a courier for Western Union. For his post-secondary education, Denny went to Watkins Institute to study accounting.

== Career ==
Denny started his career at the National Life and Accident Insurance Company in 1929, working in various departments including mail and as an actuary. The insurance firm had launched WSM radio in 1925, and its signature program, the Grand Ole Opry, had become a national platform for country artists. While with National Life, Denny worked side jobs with the Opry including selling tickets and souvenirs between 1939 and 1946. In 1946, Denny began working at WSM as the head of its Artists Service Bureau. While holding the head position at the radio station, Denny became the general manager of the Opry in 1951.

In 1954, Denny partnered with Webb Pierce to create Cedarwood Publishing Company. Denny left his WSM Artists Service Bureau position in 1956 after WSM raised conflict of interest issues, and created the Jim Denny Artist Bureau while continuing working at Cedarwood. Denny hired multiple songwriters to write for Cedarwood, including Marijohn Wilkin and Carl Perkins. He also signed a publishing contract with Buddy Holly. Denny ended his music executive career in December 1962 after he was diagnosed with colon cancer.

== Awards and honors ==
In 1955, Denny was named the 1955 Billboard Country and Western Man of the Year. Denny became the first non-musician to be named into the Country Music Hall of Fame after his posthumous induction in 1966.

== Personal life ==
Denny was married and had three kids.

== Death ==
Denny died at Saint Thomas - West Hospital in Nashville from cancer on 27 August 1963.
