= Lee Emerson (musician) =

American singer-songwriter (1927–1978)

Lee Emerson Bellamy (May 15, 1927 – December 2, 1978) was an American music singer and songwriter. As Lee Emerson, he was manager for Marty Robbins, Bobby Helms, Jimmy C. Newman, and George Jones. He also was a songwriter for Robbins along with Joe Babcock and Jim Glaser.

== Death ==
He was shot and killed at the age of 51 by business associate and fellow songwriter Barry Sadler, who was sentenced to 30 days in a Nashville workhouse for the killing.

== Discography ==
- So Little Time / Thank You My Darlin' Jan 1956 Lee Emerson And Marty Robbins
- How Long Will It Be / I'll Know You're Gone 1956 Lee Emerson
- It's So Easy For You To Be Mean / I Thought I Heard You Calling My Name 1956
- I Cried Like A Baby Lee Emerson And Marty Robbins / Where D´Ja Go ? 1957
- Start All Over / Do You Think 1957 - "Start All Over" covered by Bob Gallion 1960
- Catch That Train / What A Night 1957

-It s so easy for you to be mean/Lee Emerson with Marty Robbins/Compilation with Demos/35 Songs/Bear Family Records 2011/BCD 16526 AH

Other songs

- I Thought I Heard You Calling My Name
- "Ruby Ann"
- "Goodbye Lonesome (Hello, Baby Doll)" (Lee Emerson) from Everybody Knows (Prairie Oyster album)
