= Travelin' (Chet Atkins album) =

Studio album by Chet Atkins
- Released: 1963
- Recorded: RCA "Nashville Sound" Studio, Nashville, Tennessee
- Genre: Country, pop
- Length: 28:35
- Label: RCA Victor LSP-2678
- Producer: Anita Kerr

Chet Atkins chronology
The Guitar Genius (1963)	Travelin' (1963)	Reminiscing (1964)

Travelin' is the twenty-third studio album recorded by American guitarist Chet Atkins, released in 1963. The liner notes, titled "Smash Hit Tunes from His History-making International Tour", portray Atkins' tour of South Africa with Jim Reeves and Floyd Cramer.

== Reception ==
Professional ratings
Review scores
Source	Rating
AllMusic	3/5 stars
New Record Mirror	4/5 stars

In a review for AllMusic, critic Steven Cook wrote of the album "While often seen as no more than hokey, easy listening ephemera, Atkins' many sides from the '60s deserve a reassessment. The stellar jazz dates Atkins later did at Columbia may better showcase his jazz leanings, but these RCA discs still have a wealth of quality picking and a good share of top-drawer material."

== Reissues ==
In 1995, Travelin' and Caribbean Guitar were reissued on CD by One Way Records.

== Track listing ==
=== Side one ===
1. "Wheels" (Torre, Stephens) – 2:31
2. "Calcutta" (Conway, John Garton, Libby Quinn) – 3:01
3. "La Dolce Vita" (Nino Rota, Eduardo Verde) – 2:16
4. "Exodus" (Ernest Gold) – 3:17
5. "Baubles, Bangles and Beads" (George Forrest, Robert Wright) – 2:37
6. "Naboomspruit Polka" (Taffy Kikillus) – 2:18

=== Side two ===
1. "Muskrat Ramble" (Ray Gilbert, Kid Ory) – 2:47
2. "Warm Patat" (Nico Carstens) – 2:03
3. "Volare" (Franco Migliacci, Domenico Modugno) – 2:42
4. "Mossie Se Moses" (Nico Carstens)– 2:26
5. "Sweetness" (Jethro Burns) – 2:24
6. "The World Is Waiting for the Sunrise" (Gene Lockhart, Ernest Seitz) – 3:11

== Personnel ==
- Chet Atkins – guitar
- Floyd Cramer – piano
- Boots Randolph – saxophone
