= Lonesome 7-7203 =

Single by Hawkshaw Hawkins
- B-side: "Everything Has Changed"
- Released: March 2, 1963
- Recorded: September 10, 1962
- Genre: Country
- Length: 2:45
- Label: King
- Songwriter(s): Justin Tubb
- Producer(s): Ray Pennington

Hawkshaw Hawkins singles chronology
"Soldier's Joy" (1959)	"Lonesome 7-7203" (1963)

"Lonesome 7-7203" is a 1963 single by Hawkshaw Hawkins, written by Justin Tubb. It was the final single release of his career, released in 1963 on the King label.

== History ==
"Lonesome 7-7203" was Hawkins's first chart entry since "Soldier's Joy" in 1959. It spent 25 weeks on the Billboard Hot Country Singles charts, peaking at No. 1 on the chart dated for May 4, 1963.

Three days after its release, Hawkins died in an airplane crash which also killed Patsy Cline and Cowboy Copas. Two weeks after Hawkins' death, the song reached No. 1 for a four-week run.

The song, a heartbreak ballad, is from a man who keeps receiving phone calls for his ex. He cannot bear the constant calls (not for him) that remind him of her so he has gotten a new phone number, which he will only reveal to her, that she can call to get back in touch with him (and presumably, resume the relationship). The song is the means that he uses to give out the new number.

In a 1997 episode of Country's Family Reunion, Hawkins' widow, Jean Shepard, explained that she had recorded the song for Capitol Records about a year before Hawkins recorded it for King; however, for unknown reasons, Capitol chose not to release it at that time. Shepard went on to say that Hawkins finally told her "If they're not going to release that Justin Tubb song, I'm gonna record it".

On the same program, Justin Tubb said "I gave it to Jean (Shepard). And I still think it's a Girl's song. Because, when a Husband and Wife break up, it's usually the guy that has to leave, and the wife stays home and keeps the house and the furniture".

== Cover versions ==
Following Hawkins' version, three others charted on the country singles charts with cover versions: Burl Ives, Tony Booth and Darrell Clanton, in 1967, 1972 and 1983, respectively.

In the Netherlands and Belgium, a Dutch language version titled "Draai dan 797204" was a massive hit for Will Tura in 1964. However, it turned out that the number was an active one and its Amsterdam-based owner received thousands of calls from fans.

== Chart performance ==
=== Hawkshaw Hawkins ===
Chart (1963)	Peak position
U.S. Billboard Hot Country Singles	1
U.S. Billboard Bubbling Under Hot 100	8

=== Burl Ives ===
Chart (1967)	Peak position
U.S. Billboard Hot Country Singles	72

=== Tony Booth ===
Chart (1972)	Peak position
U.S. Billboard Hot Country Singles	16
Canadian RPM Country Tracks	7

=== Darrell Clanton ===
Chart (1983–1984)	Peak position
U.S. Billboard Hot Country Singles	24
Canadian RPM Country Tracks	21
