= Talk Back Trembling Lips =

1963 song

Single by Ernest Ashworth

from the album Hits of Today and Tomorrow
- B-side: "That's How Much I Care"
- Released: June 1963
- Recorded: May 1963
- Genre: Country
- Length: 2:37
- Label: Hickory
- Songwriter: John D. Loudermilk
- Producer: Wesley Rose

Ernest Ashworth singles chronology
"I Take the Chance" (1962)	"Talk Back Trembling Lips" (1963)	"A Week in the Country" (1964)

"Talk Back Trembling Lips"

Single by Johnny Tillotson

from the album Talk Back Trembling Lips
- B-side: "Another You"
- Released: October 1963
- Recorded: September 26, 1963
- Genre: Country
- Length: 2:36
- Label: MGM
- Songwriter: John D. Loudermilk
- Producer: Tanridge Productions Inc.

Johnny Tillotson singles chronology
"You Can Never Stop Me Loving You" (1963)	"Talk Back Trembling Lips" (1963)	"Funny How Time Slips Away" (1963)

"Talk Back Trembling Lips" is a 1963 song first recorded by Ernest Ashworth. The song became the most successful of his career and was his only number-one song on the Billboard Hot Country Singles chart that October. The song spent 35 weeks on the country chart. The song also bubbled under the Billboard Hot 100, just missing the chart's main listing as it peaked at number 101. Johnny Tillotson recorded a successful cover version in 1963 that peaked in early 1964.

== Chart performance ==
=== Ernest Ashworth ===
Chart (1963)	Peak position
US Hot Country Songs (Billboard)	1
US Billboard Hot 100	101

=== Johnny Tillotson ===
Chart (1963)	Peak position
US Adult Contemporary (Billboard)	6
US Billboard Hot 100	7

== Cover versions ==
Bowing at number 91 on 9 November 1963, Johnny Tillotson took his version of the song to number seven on the Hot 100 on 4 January 1964. It was his last top-10 single.

Still in the early '60s, a more pop-oriented version appeared by Australian singer Debbie Stuart.

Australian country singer Kevin Shegog recorded a cover of the song in 1963.

George Jones recorded a cover of the song in 1966.

Years later, country singer Becky Hobbs introduced the song to younger audiences with her 1990 cover version, although it failed to chart on the Billboard Hot Country Singles and Tracks chart. Ernest Ashworth himself appears in the music video as a guest.
