= Abilene (song) =

Single by George Hamilton IV

from the album Abilene
- B-side: "Oh So Many Years"
- Released: May 1963
- Genre: Country
- Label: RCA
- Songwriters: Bob Gibson; John D. Loudermilk; Lester Brown
- Producer: Chet Atkins

George Hamilton IV singles chronology
"In This Very Same Room" (1963)	"Abilene" (1963)	"There's More Pretty Girls Than One" (1963)

"Abilene" is a song written by Bob Gibson, Lester Brown and John D. Loudermilk, and recorded by American country music artist George Hamilton IV. In the summer of 1963, the song reached number one for four weeks on the U.S. country music chart, and peaked at number 15 on the pop music charts. George Hamilton IV performed "Abilene" in the 1963 movie Hootenanny Hoot.

== Background and writing ==
Bob Gibson was inspired to write the song after watching the Randolph Scott film Abilene Town. The setting for the film is Abilene, Kansas, the trailhead town at the end of the Chisholm Trail. Gibson said the song had often been erroneously thought to be about Abilene, Texas, named for the Kansas cowtown that had been established 24 years earlier but a much larger city.

== Chart performance ==
Chart (1963)	Peak position
US Hot Country Songs (Billboard)	1
U.S. Billboard Hot 100	15
US Adult Contemporary (Billboard)	4
Canada (CHUM Chart)	9

== Later versions ==
"Abilene" was recorded by Sonny James fourteen years later in 1977. His version became a hit on the Country charts, reaching No. 24 in the U.S. and No. 16 (for two weeks) in Canada. In 1999, The Mudballs included the song on their C. Of Love album. Bobby Bare recorded a version of the song for his 1963 album, 500 Miles Away from Home.
