= The Ballad of Jed Clampett =

Single by Flatt and Scruggs

from the album Hard Travelin' featuring the Ballad of Jed Clampett
- B-side: "Coal Loadin' Johnny"
- Released: November 26, 1962
- Genre: Bluegrass
- Label: Columbia
- Songwriter: Paul Henning
- Producers: Don Law; Frank Jones

Flatt and Scruggs singles chronology
"The Legend of the Johnson Boys" (1962)	"The Ballad of Jed Clampett" (1962)	"Pearl Pearl Pearl" (1963)

"The Ballad of Jed Clampett" is the theme song for the television series The Beverly Hillbillies and the later movie of that name, providing the introductory story for the series. The song was composed by Paul Henning, and recorded first by bluegrass musicians Lester Flatt and Earl Scruggs, with Jerry Scoggins singing.

The single phono-album version, released for radio and retail sale, merges both the beginning and ending lyrics of the theme song of the television series. The beginning theme comprises the first two verses (starting with "Come and listen to a story about a man named Jed" and "Well the first thing you know, old Jed's a millionaire"), and the ending theme is the third verse ("Now it's time to say goodbye to Jed and all his kin..."). A banjo-dominated sequence occurs between verses and as the ending fade-out.

Although the first two seasons of The Beverly Hillbillies lapsed into the public domain, "The Ballad of Jed Clampett" did not and is typically edited from public-domain releases of these episodes.

== History ==
"The Ballad of Jed Clampett" was written by producer and writer Paul Henning. It was performed by Lester Flatt and Earl Scruggs. At Louise Scruggs' suggestion, the song was released as a single. It was later included on an album, Hard Travelin.

== Charts ==
Beginning on December 8, 1962, the song spent 20 weeks on the Billboard country singles charts, scoring a maximum of number one for three weeks and scored No. 44 on the Billboard Hot 100 during 1962. It was the first bluegrass record to top the Billboard country charts. The song remained one of the best-selling and well-known bluegrass songs into the 21st century.

== Adaptations ==
"Weird Al" Yankovic merged the first two stanzas of the Ballad with the instrumentals to the Dire Straits song "Money for Nothing" for his 1989 single "Money for Nothing/Beverly Hillbillies*", which was composed for his movie UHF.

During the late 1970s, the television series Saturday Night Live featured a spoof of the Beverly Hillbillies as a skit about a wealthy family from an oil-rich Mideastern country relocating to Southern California. The theme song for the skit was termed "The Bel-Arabs".

During Bill Clinton's presidential administration, Saturday Night Live staged a spoof of the song, substituting Clinton's name for Jed Clampett's and changing the destination from Beverly Hills to the White House.

Banjo virtuoso Béla Fleck often plays the ballad in concert. Fleck also accompanied Scruggs for a re-recording of the song for the 1993 movie adaptation of The Beverly Hillbillies.

On the tv series Roseanne Dan Connor and his friends do a lively "rap" version of the song. It is on "Five Of A Kind" season 2 episode 6 of the series.

== Chart performance ==
Chart (1962–1963)	Greatest score
U.S. Billboard Hot Country Singles	1
U.S. Billboard Hot 100	44

== Media ==
The Ballad of Jed Clampett
Listen to a part of this song.

== Works cited ==
- Rosenburg, Neil V. (2005). Bluegrass: A History (revised ed.). University of Illinois Press. ISBN 9780252072451.
