= Ruby Ann =

Single by Marty Robbins
- B-side: "Won't You Forgive"
- Released: October 26, 1962
- Genre: Country
- Length: 2:01
- Label: Columbia
- Songwriter(s): Lee Emerson, Rashima Bellamy, Roberta Bellamy

Marty Robbins singles chronology
"Devil Woman" (1962)	"Ruby Ann" (1962)	"Cigarettes and Coffee Blues" (1963)

"Ruby Ann" is a song written by Lee Emerson, Rashima Bellamy and Roberta Bellamy, and recorded by American country music artist Marty Robbins. It was released in October 1962. "Ruby Ann" was the number one country follow-up to "Devil Woman." "Ruby Ann" spent a single week at number one and crossed over to the pop chart peaking at number eighteen. On the Easy Listening chart "Ruby Ann" went to number four.

== Chart performance ==
Chart (1962–1963)	Peak position
UK Singles (OCC)	24
US Hot Country Songs (Billboard)	1
US Billboard Hot 100	18
U.S. Billboard Easy Listening	4
