= Ernest Ashworth =

American country singer (1928–2009)

Background information
- Also known as: Ernie Ashworth
- Born: Ernest Bert Ashworth; December 15, 1928; Huntsville, Alabama, U.S.
- Died: March 2, 2009 (aged 80) Hartsville, Tennessee, U.S.
- Genres: Country
- Occupations: Singer, broadcaster
- Years active: 1960–2009
- Labels: Hickory
- Website: www.ernieashworth.com

Ernest Bert Ashworth (December 15, 1928 – March 2, 2009) was an American country music singer, broadcaster, and longtime Grand Ole Opry star. Signed to the Hickory label, he recorded two studio albums in his career and charted several singles on Billboard Hot Country Songs, including the number one "Talk Back Trembling Lips" and seven other top ten hits.

== Biography ==
Born in Huntsville, Alabama, United States, he began his career singing on Huntsville radio station WBHP. In 1950, he moved to Nashville, Tennessee, where he worked for several radio stations and was signed by Wesley Rose as a songwriter for Acuff-Rose Music. Among the artists who recorded his songs between 1949 and 1955 were Jimmy Dickens, Carl Smith, Johnny Horton, and Paul Anka.

Success as a recording artist eluded him, however, and in 1957 he returned to Huntsville and began working at the US Army's Redstone Arsenal, doing guided missile work. Three years later, Rose arranged a recording contract for him with Decca Records. Billed as Ernest Ashworth, his first single, "Each Moment (Spent With You)", became a Top Five hit. Later that year, "You Can’t Pick A Rose In December" went into the Top Ten; and in 1961, "Forever Gone" reached the Top 20.

In 1962, Ashworth moved to Hickory Records, owned by Acuff-Rose, and he scored a Top Five hit with "Everybody But Me", and a Top Ten with "I Take the Chance".

But it was his third release for Hickory that became a smash hit and his signature song. "Talk Back Trembling Lips" hit number one, and stayed on the national country chart for 42 weeks, and peaked at No. 101 on the pop chart.

Voted "Most Promising Male Artist" by Cashbox, Billboard, and Record World magazines in 1963 and 1964, he was invited to join the cast of the Grand Ole Opry in 1964. More chart records followed including "The D.J. Cried", "At Ease Heart", and "I Love To Dance With Annie". Ashworth continued to be a regular performer at the Opry, but he never had a record to match the success of "Talk Back Trembling Lips".

He also owned a radio station in Flomaton, Alabama, and for a brief time in the late 1980s, he also owned radio station WEKT in Elkton, Kentucky. In early 1989, after selling WEKT, he purchased radio station WSLV in Ardmore, Tennessee. In 1992, Ashworth was inducted into the Alabama Music Hall of Fame. Always a popular performer overseas, he had a number one song on the UK Independent Chart, "Lonely Only Bar", in 1999 and was also named the "Number One Most Programmed Independent Artist in Europe" that year.

Ashworth remained active as a recording artist until his death in 2009, making appearances at the Grand Ole Opry and spending much of his time tending to the affairs of his radio stations in Ardmore, and also Gallatin, Tennessee.

Ernie Ashworth died on March 2, 2009, in Harstville, Tennessee, at age 80. He had undergone bypass surgery prior to his death.

== Discography ==
=== Albums ===
Year	Album	US Country	Label
1964	Hits of Today and Tomorrow	18	Hickory
1969	The Best of Ernie Ashworth	—	Hickory
1976	Ernest Ashworth Sings His Greatest Hits	—	Starday

=== Singles ===
Year	Single	Chart Positions
Year	Single	US Country
1960	"Each Moment (Spent With You)"	4
1960	"You Can't Pick a Rose in December"	8
1961	"Forever Gone"	15
1962	"Everybody But Me"	3
1962	"I Take the Chance"	7
1963	"Talk Back Trembling Lips"^{A}	1
1964	"A Week in the Country"	10
1964	"I Love to Dance with Annie"	4
1964	"Pushed in a Corner"	11
1965	"Because I Cared"	18
1965	"The DJ Cried"	8
1966	"I Wish"	28
1966	"At Ease Heart"	13
1966	"Sad Face"	31
1967	"Just an Empty Place"	63
1967	"My Love for You (Is Like a Mountain Range)"	48
1967	"Tender and True"	48
1968	"A New Heart"	39
1969	"Where Do You Go (When You Don't Go with Me)"	69
1969	"Love, I Finally Found It"	72
1970	"That Look of Good-Bye"	72

Notes

- ^{A}Peaked at No. 1 on Bubbling Under Hot 100.
- All singles from "I Wish" onward credited to Ernie Ashworth.
