= Hawkshaw Hawkins =

American country music singer (1921–1963)

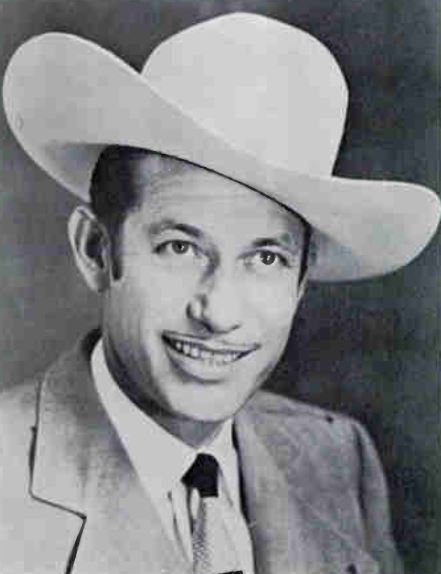

Background information
- Also known as: "The Hawk" "Eleven Yards of Personality"
- Born: Harold Franklin Hawkins; December 22, 1921; Huntington, West Virginia, U.S.
- Died: March 5, 1963 (aged 41) Camden, Tennessee, U.S.
- Genres: Country, honky-tonk
- Occupations: Singer, songwriter, musician
- Instrument: Guitar
- Years active: 1938–1963
- Labels: King Records; Columbia Records; RCA Camden

Harold Franklin "Hawkshaw" Hawkins (December 22, 1921 – March 5, 1963) was an American country music singer popular from the 1950s into the early 1960s. He was known for his rich, smooth vocals and music drawn from blues, boogie and honky tonk. At 6 feet 5 inches (1.96 m) tall, Hawkins had an imposing stage presence, and he dressed more conservatively than some other male country singers. Hawkins died in the 1963 plane crash that also killed country stars Patsy Cline and Cowboy Copas. He was a member of the Grand Ole Opry and was married to country star Jean Shepard.

== Biography ==
Harold Hawkins was born on December 22, 1921, in Huntington, West Virginia, United States. He gained his nickname as a boy after helping a neighbor track down two missing fishing rods: the neighbor called him "Hawkshaw" after the title character in the comic strip, Hawkshaw the Detective. He traded five trapped rabbits for his first guitar, and performed on WCMI-AM in Ashland, Kentucky. At 16, he won a talent competition and a job on WSAZ-AM in Huntington, where he formed Hawkshaw and Sherlock with Clarence Jack. They moved to WCHS-AM in Charleston, West Virginia, in the late 1930s. In 1940, at 19, he married Reva Mason Barbour, a 16-year-old from Huntington.

During 1941, Hawkins traveled the United States with a musical revue. He entered the U.S. Army in 1943 during World War II, and served as an engineer stationed near Paris, Texas, where he and friends performed at local clubs. As a staff sergeant, he was stationed in France and fought in the Battle of the Bulge, winning four battle stars during 15 months of combat. He was also stationed in Manila and performed there on the radio.

=== Postwar success ===
After he was discharged, Hawkins became a regular on WWVA Jamboree from 1945 to 1954 in Wheeling, West Virginia. In 1946, he signed a recording contract with King Records in Cincinnati. This nearly never happened, as Syd Nathan almost threw his poorly-made demonstration record away without listening to it. However, upon listening Nathan agreed to record four Hawkins sides in West Virginia. His first two recordings with King, "Pan American" and "Dog House Boogie", were top ten country hits. A minor hit, and the song that became his signature tune, was "The Sunny Side of the Mountain." "Slow Poke", recorded in 1951, was another notable King recording. He stayed with the label until 1953.

Because of his height of six feet, five inches and his outgoing personality, he was christened "Eleven Yards of Personality".

In 1951, Hawkins and his wife adopted four-year old Susan Marlene. They divorced in 1958 and Susan traveled back and forth between her parents in summers and for holidays.

Beginning in 1954, Hawkins was a regular performer on ABC Radio and TV's Ozark Jubilee in Springfield, Missouri, where he met his second wife, Jean Shepard. After a few years with Columbia and RCA Records, he joined the Grand Ole Opry and returned to King; and in 1962 he recorded his biggest hit, "Lonesome 7-7203". It first appeared on the Billboard country chart as a March 2, 1963, release, three days before Hawkins died. The song was absent from the charts for the two weeks following his death, but re-appeared on March 23 and spent 25 weeks on the chart, four of them at No. 1, an accomplishment that eluded him in life.

=== Aircraft accident ===
On March 3, 1963, Hawkins, Patsy Cline and Cowboy Copas performed at a benefit concert at the Soldiers and Sailors Memorial Hall in Kansas City, Kansas, for the family of disc jockey "Cactus" Jack Call, who had died in January after an automobile accident. Among the performers was Billy Walker, who received an urgent phone call and needed to return to Nashville immediately. Hawkins gave Walker his commercial airline ticket and instead flew back in a private plane in Walker's place.

On March 5, Hawkins, Cline and Copas left for Nashville in a Piper Comanche piloted by Randy Hughes, Cline's manager (and Copas's son-in-law). After stopping to refuel in Dyersburg, Tennessee, the craft took off at 6:07 p.m. CT. The plane flew into severe weather and crashed at 6:29 p.m. in a forest near Camden, Tennessee, 90 miles from Nashville. There were no survivors. Fans around the world mourned the loss; Hawkshaw was survived by his daughter Susan Marlene, his young son Donnie, and his wife Jean Shepard, who was pregnant at the time with their second son, Harold Franklin Hawkins Jr., who was born one month after his father's death.

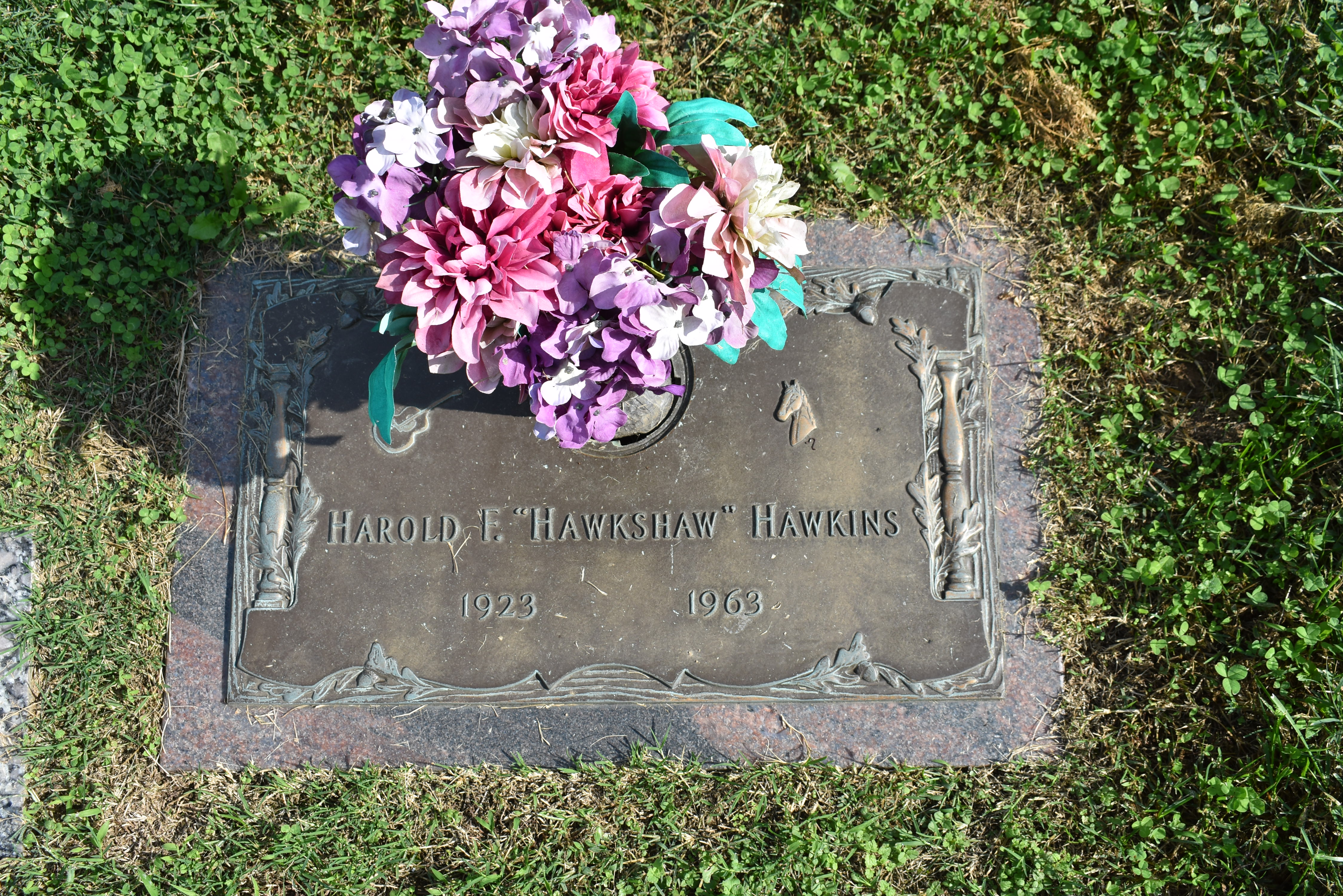
Gravestone of Hawkshaw Hawkins

Hawkins was buried at Forest Lawn Memorial Gardens in Goodlettsville, Tennessee, in Music Row with Copas and other country music stars. Hawkins' gravestone was inscribed with an inaccurate birth year of 1923. Hawkins was born in 1921.

== Legacy ==
The location of the airplane crash in the still-remote forest outside Camden is noted by a stone marker, dedicated on July 6, 1996.

Hawkins is remembered in "Love Never Dies" on Martin Simpson's 2003 album, Righteousness and Humidity. In the song, Simpson meets an old truck driver who used to play guitar: "I gave old Hawkshaw a Gibson one time, it was a J-200, man, such a sweet neck! And they say it stood up like a country grave marker, right there in the middle of that plane wreck."

== Discography ==
=== Albums ===
- 1958: Hawkshaw Hawkins Sings Grand Ole Opry Favorites, Vol. 1 (King)
- 1958: Hawkshaw Hawkins Sings Grand Ole Opry Favorites, Vol. 2 (King)
- 1959: Hawkshaw Hawkins (La Brea)
- 1959: Hawkshaw Hawkins Sings Grand Ole Opry Favorites, Vol. 3 (King)
- 1959: Country Western Cavalcade (Gladwynne)
- 1963: Taken from Our Vaults, Vol. 1 (King)
- 1963: Taken from Our Vaults, Vol. 2 (King)
- 1963: The All New Hawkshaw Hawkins (King)
- 1963: The Great Hawkshaw Hawkins (Harmony)
- 1964: Hawkshaw Hawkins Sings Hawkshaw Hawkins (RCA Camden)
- 1964: Taken from Our Vaults, Vol. 3 (King)
- 1965: Gone, but Not Forgotten (Starday)
- 1966: The Country Gentlemen (RCA Camden)

=== Singles ===
Year	Single	Peak chart positions	
Year	Single	US Country	US
1946	"After All (That We Have Meant to Each Other)"	—	—
1947	"Sunny Side of the Mountain"	—	—
1948	"Pan American"	9	—
1948	"Dog House Boogie"	6	—
1949	"I Wasted a Nickel"	15	—
1951	"I Love You a Thousand Ways"	8	—
1951	"Rattlesnakin' Daddy"	—	—
1951	"I'm Waiting Just for You"	8	—
1951	"Slow Poke"	7	26
1954	"Waitin' for My Baby"	—	—
1954	"Rebound"	—	—
1955	"Ko Ko Mo (I Love You So)" (w/ Rita Robbins)	—	—
1955	"Car Hoppin' Mama"	flip	—
1956	"It Would Be a Doggone Lie"	—	—
1956	"My Fate (Is In Your Hands)	—	—
1957	"(Is My Ring) On Your Finger"	—	—
1958	"Freedom"	—	—
1959	"Soldier's Joy"	15	87
1960	"Patanio"	—	—
1960	"Put a Nickel in the Jukebox"	—	—
1962	"Twenty Miles from the Shore"	—	—
1962	"Darkness On the Face of the Earth"	—	—
1962	"I Can't Seem to Say Goodbye"	flip	—
1963	"Lonesome 7-7203"	1	108
