= Melba Montgomery discography =

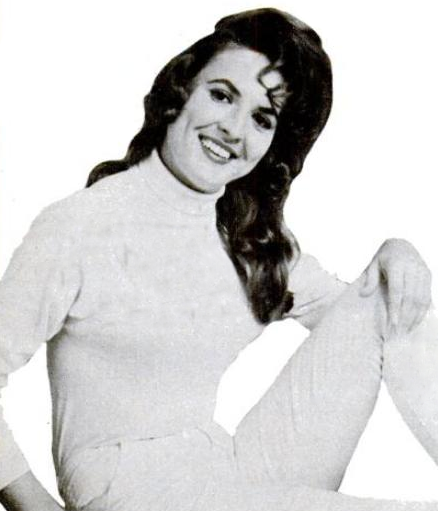
- A trade ad for the single "What I Can Tell the Folks Back Home", 1967.
- Studio albums: 29
- Compilation albums: 8
- Singles: 61
- Solo studio albums: 22
- Collaborative studio albums: 7
- Solo artist singles: 42
- Collaborative singles: 18
- Other charting songs: 1
- Other appearances: 5

The discography of American country artist, Melba Montgomery contains 29 studio albums, eight compilation albums, 61 singles, one other charting song and has appeared on five albums. Of her studio albums, 22 are solo releases while seven are collaborative releases. Of her singles, 42 are solo releases while 18 are collaborative. Montgomery collaborated with George Jones on 1963's "We Must Have Been Out of Our Minds", which reached number three on the Billboard Hot Country Songs chart. Together, they recorded several studio albums including Singing What's in Our Heart (1963), which reached number three on the Billboard Top Country Albums chart. The United Artists and Musicor labels issued several more singles by the pair. Among them were the top 25 songs "Multiply the Heartaches" (1965) and "Party Pickin'" (1967). She also collaborated with Gene Pitney during the sixties on the top 20 single "Baby Ain't That Fine" (1965). Both United Artists and Musicor issued several solo studio albums and singles by Montgomery during the sixties also. Among them was the charting single "Hall of Shame" (1963) and the 1967 LP, Don't Keep Me Lonely Too Long (1967).

In 1970, Montgomery teamed up with Charlie Louvin to record the top 20 country single "Something to Brag About". Their 1970 LP of the same name made the Billboard country albums chart as well. Montgomery's solo music did not become commercially successful until she began recording for Elektra Records in 1973. The single "Wrap Your Love Around Me" (1973) charted in the Billboard country top 40. In 1974, she reached her peak solo success with the single "No Charge". The track topped the country songs chart, crossed over onto the Billboard Hot 100 and topped the RPM country chart in Canada. Her 1974 solo LP of the same name reached number 14 on the Top Country Albums chart. Montgomery followed it with the charting LP Don't Let the Good Times Fool You in 1975. Its title track reached the top 20 of the country charts. Her second self-titled studio LP spawned a cover of "Angel of the Morning", which reached number 22 on the Billboard country chart. Montgomery has continued sporadically releasing singles and albums since the early eighties. Her most recent album is Things That Keep You Going (2010).

== Albums ==
=== Solo studio albums ===
List of studio albums, with selected chart positions and other relevant details
Title	Album details	Peak chart positions
Title	Album details	US Country
America's Number One Country and Western Girl Singer	Released: February 1964; Label: United Artists; Formats: LP	—
Down Home	Released: August 1964; Label: United Artists; Formats: LP	—
I Can't Get Used to Being Lonely	Released: July 1965; Label: United Artists; Formats: LP	—
Hallelujah Road	Released: July 1966; Label: Musicor; Formats: LP	—
Country Girl	Released: November 1966; Label: Musicor; Formats: LP	—
Melba Toast	Released: March 1967; Label: Musicor; Formats: LP	—
Don't Keep Me Lonely Too Long	Released: March 1967; Label: Musicor; Formats: LP	—
I'm Just Living	Released: December 1967; Label: Musicor; Formats: LP	—
The Big Beautiful Country World of Melba Montgomery	Released: October 1969; Label: Capitol; Formats: LP	—
Don't Keep Me Lonely Too Long	Released: May 1970; Label: Capitol; Formats: LP	—
Melba Montgomery	Released: October 1973; Label: Elektra; Formats: LP	—
No Charge	Released: April 1974; Label: Elektra; Formats: LP	14
Don't Let the Good Times Fool You	Released: April 1975; Label: Elektra; Formats: LP, cassette	47
The Greatest Gift of All	Released: November 1975; Label: Elektra; Formats: LP	—
Melba Montgomery	Released: March 1978; Label: United Artists; Formats: LP	—
I Still Care	Released: 1982; Label: Phonorama; Formats: LP	—
Audiograph Alive	Released: 1983; Label: Audiograph; Formats: LP	—
No Charge	Released: 1986; Label: Compass; Formats: LP	—
Do You Know Where Your Man Is	Released: 1992; Label: Playback; Formats: CD	—
This Time Around	Released: 1997; Label: CMC; Formats: CD	—
Studio 102 Essentials	Released: May 27, 2008; Label: Suite 102; Formats: CD, digital	—
Things That Keep You Going	Released: December 14, 2010; Label: RPM; Formats: CD, digital	—
"—" denotes a recording that did not chart or was not released in that territory.

=== Collaborative studio albums ===
List of studio albums, with selected chart positions and other relevant details
Title	Album details	Peak chart positions
Title	Album details	US Country
Singing What's in Our Heart (with George Jones)	Released: November 1963; Label: United Artists; Formats: LP	3
Bluegrass Hootenanny (with George Jones)	Released: March 1964; Label: United Artists; Formats: LP	12
Being Together (with Gene Pitney)	Released: December 1965; Label: Musicor; Formats: LP	—
Close Together (As You and Me) (with George Jones)	Released: November 1966; Label: Musicor; Formats: LP	28
Let's Get Together (with George Jones)	Released: July 1967; Label: Musicor; Formats: LP	37
Something to Brag About (with Charlie Louvin)	Released: January 1971; Label: Capitol; Formats: LP	45
Baby You've Got What It Takes (with Charlie Louvin)	Released: July 1971; Label: Capitol; Formats: LP	45
"—" denotes a recording that did not chart or was not released in that territory.

=== Compilation albums ===
List of compilation albums, showing all relevant details
Title	Album details
A King & Two Queens (with George Jones and Judy Lynn)	Released: 1964; Label: United Artists; Formats: LP
Queens of Country Music (with Dottie West)	Released: 1965; Label: Starday; Formats: LP
Famous Country Duets (with George Jones and Gene Pitney)	Released: January 1966; Label: Musicor; Formats: LP
Blue Moon of Kentucky (with George Jones)	Released: February 1966; Label: United Artists; Formats: LP
The Mood I'm In	Released: January 1967; Label: United Artists; Formats: LP
Aching Breaking Heart	Released: 1974; Label: Capitol; Formats: LP
Vintage Collections: George Jones and Melba Montgomery (with George Jones)	Released: January 23, 1996; Label: Capitol; Formats: CD, cassette
Melba Montgomery: Signature Series	Released: 2003; Label: CMG/EMI; Formats: CD

== Singles ==
=== As a solo artist ===
List of singles, with selected chart positions, showing other relevant details
Title	Year	Peak chart positions					Album
Title	Year	US	US Cou.	CAN	CAN Cou.	CAN AC	Album
"Shoe Old Ranger"	1962	—	—	—	—	—	—N/a
"I'm No Longer in Your Heart"	1962	—	—	—	—	—	—N/a
"Your Picture (Keeps Smiling Back at Me)"	1962	—	—	—	—	—	—N/a
"Hall of Shame"	1963	—	22	—	—	—	Down Home
"The Greatest One of All"	1963	—	26	—	—	—	Down Home
"The Face"	1964	—	—	—	—	—	Down Home
"Big Big Heartaches"	1964	—	—	—	—	—	America's Number One One; Country and Western Girl Singer
"I Can't Get Used to Being Lonely"	1965	—	—	—	—	—	I Can't Get Used to Being Lonely
"I Saw It"	1965	—	—	—	—	—	I Can't Get Used to Being Lonely
"I'll Wait Till Seven"	1965	—	—	—	—	—	I Can't Get Used to Being Lonely
"Constantly"	1965	—	—	—	—	—	I Can't Get Used to Being Lonely
"Don't Keep Me Lonely Too Long"	1966	—	—	—	—	—	Don't Keep Me Lonely Too Long (1967 album)
"Crossing Over Jordan"	1966	—	—	—	—	—	Hallelujah Road
"My Tiny Music Box"	1966	—	—	—	—	—	Don't Keep Me Lonely Too Long (1967 album)
"Won't Take Long"	1966	—	—	—	—	—	Melba Toast
"What Can I Tell the Folks Back Home"	1967	—	61	—	—	—	I'm Just Living
"Twilight Years"	1967	—	—	—	—	—	Melba Toast
"You Put Me Here"	1968	—	—	—	—	—	Melba Toast
"Hallelujah Road"	1968	—	—	—	—	—	Hallelujah Road
"What's to Become of What's Left of Me"	1969	—	—	—	—	—	—N/a
"As Far as My Forgetting's Got"	1969	—	—	—	—	—	The Big Beautiful Country; World of Melba Montgomery
"The Closer She Gets"	1970	—	—	—	—	—	Don't Keep Me Lonely Too Long (1970 album)
"Eloy Crossing"	1970	—	—	—	—	—	—N/a
"He's My Man"	1971	—	61	—	—	—	—N/a
"Hope I Never Love That Way Again"	1972	—	—	—	—	—	—N/a
"Wrap Your Love Around Me"	1973	—	38	—	47	—	Melba Montgomery (1973 album)
"He'll Come Home"	1974	—	58	—	47	—	Melba Montgomery (1973 album)
"No Charge"	1974	39	1	47	1	24	No Charge
"Your Pretty Roses Came Too Late"	1974	—	67	—	—	—	Don't Let the Good Times Fool You
"If You Want the Rainbow"	1974	—	59	—	—	—	Don't Let the Good Times Fool You
"Don't Let the Good Times Fool You"	1975	—	15	—	14	—	Don't Let the Good Times Fool You
"Searchin' (For Someone Like You)"	1975	—	45	—	—	—	Don't Let the Good Times Fool You
"He Loved You Right Out of My Mind"	1975	—	—	—	—	—	The Greatest Gift of All
"Love Was the Wind"	1975	—	67	—	—	—	—N/a
"Never Ending Love Affair"	1977	—	83	—	—	—	Melba Montgomery (1978 album)
"Before the Pain Comes"	1977	—	—	—	—	—	Melba Montgomery (1978 album)
"Angel of the Morning"	1977	—	22	—	48	—	Melba Montgomery (1978 album)
"Leavin' Me in Your Mind"	1978	—	—	—	—	—	Melba Montgomery (1978 album)
"The Star"	1980	—	92	—	—	—	—N/a
"Straight Talkin'"	1986	—	79	—	—	—	—N/a
"I'll Go Somewhere (And Cry Myself to Sleep)"	1989	—	—	—	—	—	—N/a
"The Key's in the Mailbox"	1990	—	—	—	—	—	—N/a
"Your Heart Turned Left (And I Was on the Right)"	1992	—	—	—	—	—	Do You Know Where Your Man Is
"—" denotes a recording that did not chart or was not released in that territory.

=== As a collaborative artist ===
List of singles, with selected chart positions, showing other relevant details
Title	Year	Peak chart positions		Album
Title	Year	US Cou.	CAN Cou.	Album
"We Must Have Been Out of Our Minds" (with George Jones)	1963	3	—	What's in Our Heart
"Let's Invite Them Over" (with George Jones)	1963	17	—	What's in Our Heart
"Please Be My Love" (with George Jones)	1964	31	—	Bluegrass Hootenanny
"Multiply the Heartaches" (with George Jones)	1964	25	—	What's in Our Heart
"House of Gold" (with George Jones)	1965	—	—	Bluegrass Hootenanny
"Blue Moon of Kentucky" (with George Jones)	1965	—	—	Blue Moon of Kentucky
"Baby Ain't That Fine" (with Gene Pitney)	1965	15	—	Being Together
"Being Together" (with Gene Pitney)	1966	—	—	Being Together
"Close Together (As You and Me)" (with George Jones)	1966	70	—	Close Together
"Party Pickin'" (with George Jones)	1967	24	—	Party Pickin'
"Our Little Man" (with Judy Lynn)	1968	—	—	—N/a
"Something to Brag About" (with Charlie Louvin)	1970	18	26	Something to Brag About
"Did You Ever" (with Charlie Louvin)	1971	26	—	Baby You've Got What It Takes
"Baby You've Got What It Takes" (with Charlie Louvin)	1971	30	—	Baby You've Got What It Takes
"I'm Gonna Leave You" (with Charlie Louvin)	1971	60	—	—N/a
"Baby What's Wrong with Us" (with Charlie Louvin)	1972	66	—	—N/a
"A Man Likes Things Like That" (with Charlie Louvin)	1972	59	—	—N/a
"Almost Over the Line" (with Lee Dillard)	1987	—	—	—N/a
"—" denotes a recording that did not chart or was not released in that territory.

== Other charted songs ==
List of songs, with selected chart positions, showing other relevant details
Title	Year	Peak chart positions	Album	Notes
Title	Year	US Country	Album	Notes
"What's in Our Heart" (with George Jones)	1963	20	What's in Our Heart	(Note: B-side to "Let's Invite Them Over".)

== Other appearances ==
List of non-single guest appearances, with other performing artists, showing year released and album name
Title	Year	Other artist(s)	Album	Ref.
"Hark! The Herald Angels Sing"	1988	none	K-Tel Presents Christmas Favorites	
"Shameless Lies"	1994	Marty Brown	Cryin', Lovin', Leavin'	
"Milwaukee Here I Come"	1999	John Prine	In Spite of Ourselves	
"We Must Have Been Out of Our Minds"	1999	John Prine	In Spite of Ourselves	
"You Win Again"	2001	Ralph Stanley	Clinch Mountain Sweethearts	
