= Down Home (Melba Montgomery album) =

Studio album by Melba Montgomery
- Released: August 1964
- Recorded: January – December 1963
- Studio: Columbia (Nashville, Tennessee)
- Genre: Country
- Label: United Artists
- Producer: Pappy Daily

Melba Montgomery chronology
Bluegrass Hootenanny (1964)	Down Home (1964)	I Can't Get Used to Being Lonely (1965)

Singles from Down Home
- 1. "Hall of Shame" Released: March 1963; 2. "The Greatest One of All" Released: October 1963; 3. "The Face" Released: March 1964

Down Home is a studio album by American country artist, Melba Montgomery. It was released in August 1964 via United Artists Records and contained 11 tracks. It was the third studio disc released in Montgomery's recording career and her second as a solo artist. Many of the album's tracks were penned by Montgomery herself. Two of its singles reached charting positions on the American country songs chart. It received a positive review from Billboard magazine in 1964.

== Background ==
Melba Montgomery rose to commercial success as a duet pairing with George Jones. Their recording of her composition, "We Must Have Been Out of Our Minds", was a top three single on the country charts in 1963. Over the next several years, the Jones-Montgomery pairing would record a series of albums and singles. She also appeared as a solo artist during the sixties decade, with albums and singles of her own.

== Recording and content ==
Down Home was Montgomery's second solo album in her recording career. The disc was produced by Pappy Daily in sessions held between January and September 1963. The sessions were held at the Columbia Studios, located in Nashville, Tennessee. The album contained a total of 12 tracks. Seven of the album's songs were composed by Montgomery herself. Among them was the Jones-Montgomery duet, "We Must Have Been Out of Our Minds" (first released on the album What's in Our Hearts). Three selections were co-written with her brother, Carl Montgomery: "Lies Can't Hide What's on My Mind", "What's Bad for You Is Good for Me" and "Don't Make Me Build Another Wall".

== Release, reception and singles ==
Down Home was released in August 1964 on United Artists Records. It was distributed as a vinyl LP, with six songs on either side of the record. Billboard named it among its album "Special Merit"s when reviewing it. "There are few gals who can warble a country tune like Melba Montgomery, and this album is ample proof why her popularity is growing among country fans," the magazine wrote. AllMusic rated the album three out of five stars.

Three singles were included on the disc. Two of these singles reached charting positions. "Hall of Shame" (released in March 1963) reached number 22 on the American Billboard Hot Country Songs chart. "The Greatest One of All" (released in October 1963) reached number 26 on the Billboard country chart. The songs were Montgomery's first solo entries on the Billboard country songs chart and her highest-peaking solo entries until 1974's "No Charge". "The Face" was first issued as a single in March 1964.

== Track listing ==
Side one
No.	Title	Length
1.	"Lies Can't Hide What's on My Mind"	2:30
2.	"Hall of Shame"	2:39
3.	"The Face"	2:21
4.	"Why Does the Lady Cry"	2:05
5.	"We Must Have Been Out of Our Minds" (with George Jones)	2:36
6.	"Before She Changed Your Mind"	2:46

Side two
No.	Title	Length
1.	"I'll Always Keep on Loving You"	2:28
2.	"I Can't Change Overnight"	2:22
3.	"The Greatest One of All"	2:35
4.	"There's a Friend in the Way" (with George Jones)	2:05
5.	"What's Bad for You Is Good for Me"	2:12
6.	"Don't Make Me Build Another Wall"	2:31

== Release history ==
Region	Date	Format	Label	Ref.
North America	August 1964	Vinyl (Mono and Stereo)	United Artists Records	
