= Please Be My Love =

Single by George Jones and Melba Montgomery

from the album Bluegrass Hootenanny
- B-side: "Will There Ever Be Another"
- Released: July 28, 1964
- Recorded: 1964
- Genre: Country
- Length: 2:31
- Label: RCA
- Songwriter(s): Monroe Fields, Carl Sauceman
- Producer(s): Pappy Daily

George Jones and Melba Montgomery singles chronology
"Let's Invite Them over" (1963)	"Please Be My Love" (1964)	"Multiply the Heartaches" (1964)

Please Be My Love is a duet by George Jones and Melba Montgomery. It was composed by Carl Sauceman and Monroe Fields and originally recorded by Carl Sauceman and The Green Valley Boys in 1960. This was Jones and Montgomery's third single but it was only a minor hit, peaking at #31 on the Billboard country singles chart. Like many Jones/Montgomery recordings, the song has a distinct bluegrass flavor, which was atypical for Jones. Although they would release several more singles together, Jones and Montgomery would never again achieve the success they had with their Top 5 smash 1963 smash "We Must Have Been Out of Our Minds".
