= House of Gold =

House of Gold may refer to:

== Film ==
- The House of Gold, a 1918 American silent film
- House of Gold (film), a 2013 Ghanaian Nigerian film

== Music ==
- "A House of Gold", a song by Hank Williams, 1954
- "House of Gold" (Twenty One Pilots song), 2011
