= A King & Two Queens =

Compilation album by George Jones, Judy Lynn, and Melba Montgomery
- Released: 1964
- Genre: Country
- Label: United Artists

George Jones chronology
Singing What's in Our Heart (1963)	A King & Two Queens (1964)	Bluegrass Hootenanny (1964)

A King & Two Queens is an album featuring four solo performances each by American country music artists George Jones, Melba Montgomery and Judy Lynn, released in 1964 on the United Artists Records. Jones and Montgomery had scored a number one country hit with the duet "We Must Have Been Out Of Our Minds" in 1963 and released the album What's in Our Heart the same year. Jones and Montgomery popularized the male-female country singer genre throughout the decade. Lynn, a former beauty queen who had joined a nationwide tour of Grand Ole Opry performers as a teenager, sings four of the tracks on this album.

== Track listing ==
1. "Brown to Blue" (George Jones solo)
2. "The Face" (Melba Montgomery solo)
3. "Almost Out of My Mind" (Judy Lynn solo)
4. "Wrong Number" (George Jones solo)
5. "I Can't Change Overnight" (Melba Montgomery solo)
6. "Unexpected Guest" (Judy Lynn solo)
7. "Without a Reason" (George Jones solo)
8. "I'll Always Keep on Loving You" (Melba Montgomery solo)
9. "My Tears Are on the Roses" (Judy Lynn solo)
10. "Please Talk to My Heart" (George Jones solo)
11. "Big Big Heartaches" (Melba Montgomery solo)
12. "Antique in My Closet" (Judy Lynn solo)
