= Wrap Your Love Around Me =

Single by Melba Montgomery

from the album Melba Montgomery
- B-side: "Let Me Show You How I Can"
- Released: September 1973
- Recorded: August 1973
- Studio: Pete's Place
- Genre: Country
- Length: 2:25
- Label: Elektra
- Songwriter(s): Melba Montgomery; Jack Saolomon
- Producer(s): Pete Drake

Melba Montgomery singles chronology
| "Hope I Never Love This Way Again" (1972) | "Wrap Your Love Around Me" (1973) | "He'll Come Home" (1974) |

"Wrap Your Love Around Me" is a song recorded by American country artist, Melba Montgomery. It was composed by Montgomery, along with Jack Solomon. It was the first single of Montgomery's released on Elektra Records and reached the top 40 of the American country songs chart in 1973. It was included on her 1973 eponymous studio album. It was met with positive reception from Billboard magazine in 1973.

== Background, recording and content ==
Up until the seventies, Melba Montgomery had been known for her duet recordings with country artists George Jones, Gene Pitney and Charlie Louvin. Among her most commercially-successful duets was the top five country single, "We Must Have Been Out of Our Minds" (1963). After collaborating with Pete Drake, he helped her secure a new recording contract with Elektra Records in 1973. Her first single with the label was the self-composed recording, "Wrap Your Love Around Me". Montgomery wrote the song with husband, Jack Salomon. It was recorded at Pete's Place, a studio in Nashville, Tennessee owned by Pete Drake, who also produced the song. The session was held in August 1973.

== Chart performance and reception ==
"Wrap Your Love Around Me" was released as Monrtgomery's first single on Elektra Records in September 1973. It was backed on the B-side by the song "Let Me Show You How I Can". It was distributed as a seven inch vinyl single. The song reached number 38 on the American Billboard Hot Country Songs chart in fall 1973. It became Montgomery's third solo single to enter the top 40 on the country chart. In Canada, the song reached number 47 on the RPM Country Tracks chart. It was later included on Montgomery's eponymous studio album in October 1973. Billboard magazine named the song among its "Top Single Picks" in September 1973. "Oh how this girl can sing. The long awaited first released on this label was worth waiting for. A beautiful song which she performs to absolute perfection," the magazine commented.

== Track listing ==
7" vinyl single

- "Wrap Your Love Around Me" – 2:25
- "Let Me Show You How I Can" – 2:24

== Charts ==
| Chart (1973) | Peak position |
|---|---|
| Canada Country Tracks (RPM) | 47 |
| US Hot Country Songs (Billboard) | 38 |
