= Melba Montgomery (1978 album) =

Studio album by Melba Montgomery
- Released: March 1978
- Recorded: September 1976
- Studio: Jack Clement Recording (Nashville, Tennessee)
- Genre: Country
- Label: United Artists
- Producer: Larry Butler; Pete Drake

Melba Montgomery chronology
The Greatest Gift of All (1975)	Melba Montgomery (1978)	I Still Care (1982)

Singles from Melba Montgomery
- 1. "Never Ending Love Affair" Released: June 1977; 2. "Before the Pain Comes" Released: August 1977; 3. "Angel of the Morning" Released: November 1977; 4. "Leavin' Me in Your Mind" Released: February 1978

Melba Montgomery is a eponymous studio album by American country artist, Melba Montgomery. It was released in March 1978 via United Artists Records and was the twenty second studio disc of her career. The album featured a total of ten tracks, four of which were originally released as singles. Its most commercially-successful was a cover of "Angel of the Morning". The song reached both the American and Canadian country charts in 1978.

== Background, recording and content ==
Melba Montgomery had recently reached success as a solo artist after years of duet recordings. Her 1974 single, "No Charge", topped the country charts. The song, along with several other recordings, were released through Elektra Records. It was then announced that Montgomery would sign with United Artists Records and begin working under the production of Larry Butler. He would produce Montgomery's eponymous album, along with Pete Drake. The project was recorded in September 1976 at the Jack Clement Recording Studio, located in Nashville, Tennessee.

The album's ten tracks featured diverse instrumentation from steel guitars, along with strings and background vocals. Two songs were penned by Nashville songwriter and artist, Linda Hargrove: "You Sure Saved Me from Myself" and "Hope for Your Happiness". Producer Larry Butler contributed to the writing of the final track, "Never Ending Love Affair". A cover of Merrilee Rush's "Angel of the Morning" was also included on the project.

== Release, reception and singles ==
Melba Montgomery was released in March 1978 on United Artists Records. It marked the twenty second studio album released in Montgomery's recording career. It was distributed as a vinyl LP, featuring five tracks on either side of the record. Billboard gave the album a positive reception, naming it among its "Recommended LP's" in 1978. The publication named "Angel of the Morning", "Never Ending Love Affair" and "Before the Pain Comes" as the album's "best cuts". Four singles were included on the disc. Its first was "Never Ending Love Affair", which was originally released in June 1977. The single reached number 83 on the American Billboard Hot Country Songs chart that year.

"Before the Pain Comes" was also originally released as a single in August 1977. "Angel of the Morning" was released in November 1977. The song was the highest-charting from the album, peaking at number 22 on the Billboard country chart and number 48 on the Canadian RPM Country chart. "Leavin' Me in Your Mind" was issued as a single in February 1978.

== Track listing ==
Side one
No.	Title	Writer(s)	Length
1.	"Angel of the Morning"	C. Taylor	3:44
2.	"You Sure Saved Me from Myself"	L. Hargrove	3:17
3.	"There's Nothing I Don't See (In You)"	J. Tweel	3:04
4.	"Everybody's Got a Special Song"	M. Clark	2:35
5.	"Before the Pain Comes"	R. Lane; D. Morrison	3:03

Side two
No.	Title	Writer(s)	Length
1.	"We've Been Lying Here Too Long"	J. Dyer; J. Tweel	2:51
2.	"The Pinkerton's Flowers"	P. Rose	3:12
3.	"Leavin' Me in Your Mind"	P. Drake; J. Tweel	2:52
4.	"Hope for Your Happiness"	L. Hargrove	2:33
5.	"Never Ending Love Affair"	R. Bowling; L. Butler; S. Tutsie	2:15

== Personnel ==
All credits are adapted from the liner notes of Melba Montgomery.

Musical personnel

- Tommy Allsup – Bass guitar
- Stu Basore – Steel guitar
- George Binkley – Strings
- Jim Buchanan – Fiddle
- Kenneth Buttrey – Drums
- Jimmy Capps – Acoustic guitar
- Jerry Carrigan – Drums
- Fred Carter Jr. – Bass guitar
- Marvin Chantry – Strings
- Roy Christensen – Strings
- Pete Drake – Steel guitar
- Ray Edenton – Acoustic guitar
- Paul Franklin – Steel guitar
- Carl Gorodetsky – Strings
- Lenny Haight – Strings
- Buddy Harman – Drums
- Kelso Herston – Bass guitar
- Randy Hillman – Bass
- Shane Keister – Piano
- Sheldon Kurland – Strings
- Kenny Malone – Drums
- Charlie McCoy – Harmonica
- Martha McCrory – Strings
- Melba Montgomery – Lead vocals
- Bob Moore – Bass
- Hargus "Pig" Robbins – Piano
- Pam Rose – Acoustic guitar
- Jack Salomon – Acoustic guitar
- Billy Sanford – Electric guitar
- Larry Sasser – Steel guitar
- Lang Scruggs – Banjo
- Jerry Shook – Acoustic guitar
- Steven Smith – Strings
- Donald Teal – Strings
- Jeff Tweel – Piano
- Gary Vanosdale – Strings
- Pete Wade – Electric guitar
- Tommy Williams – Fiddle
- Bobby Wood – Piano

Technical personnel

- Larry Butler – Producer
- Pete Drake – Producer
- Billy Sherrill – Engineer

== Release history ==
Region	Date	Format	Label	Ref.
North America	March 1978	Vinyl	United Artists Records	
United Kingdom	March 1978	Vinyl	United Artists Records	
