= No Charge (album) =

Studio album by Melba Montgomery
- Released: April 1974
- Recorded: January 1974
- Studio: Pete's Place
- Genre: Country; traditional country
- Label: Elektra
- Producer: Pete Drake

Melba Montgomery chronology
Melba Montgomery (1973)	No Charge (1974)	Don't Let the Good Times Fool You (1975)

Singles from No Charge
- 1. "No Charge" Released: February 1974

No Charge is a studio album by American country artist, Melba Montgomery. It was released in April 1974 via Elektra Records and was the nineteenth studio collection of Montgomery's career. The disc contained a total of 12 tracks which mixed in different styles of country music. Its title track topped the country charts in the United States and Canada in 1974. The album itself reached the top 20 of the American country LP's chart in 1974 and received positive reviews following its release.

== Background ==
Melba Montgomery first rose to commercial success in the 1960s recording as a duet partnership with George Jones. Their first single together, "We Must Have Been Out of Our Minds", reached the top five of the country charts in 1963. It was followed by several more top 40 singles and established Montgomery's persona as a duet partner. After Jones, Montgomery recorded with Gene Pitney and had a top 20 duet with Charlie Louvin in 1971. However, success as a solo artist eluded her. Montgomery began working with producer Pete Drake in the seventies, who helped her move to Elektra Records in 1973. From there, she would reach the peak of her solo career with the single, "No Charge".

== Recording and content ==
The album for which the single was named was recorded in January 1974. The sessions were held at Pete's Place, a Nashville, Tennessee studio owned by producer Pete Drake. The disc contained a total of 12 tracks. Two of the album's tracks were co-written by Montgomery herself: "My Feel Good Sure Feels Fine" and "Love, I Need You". The title track was penned entirely by Nashville songwriter, Harlan Howard. Recorded as a recitation, the song described the love between a mother and a child. Billboard magazine described the album's production to embody both contemporary country sounds, along with traditional elements.

== Release, chart performance, reception and singles ==
Professional ratings
Review scores
Source	Rating
Allmusic	4/5 stars

No Charge was released in April 1974 on Elektra Records. It was the second studio album of Montgomery's issued on Elektra and her nineteenth album overall. It was distributed as a vinyl LP, with six songs on each side of the record. Following its release, No Charge peaked at the number 14 position on the American Billboard Top Country Albums chart. It was Montgomery's first solo LP to make the chart. Her previous studio albums to chart were duet discs with other artists. It was also her highest-charting solo album in her career.

Billboard magazine positively commented that Montgomery "never sounded better nor has a better collection of tunes" been "assembled". AllMusic would later rate the album four out of five stars. The title track was the disc's only single, issued in February 1974. The song became her only single to reach the number one spot on the Billboard Hot Country Songs chart. It also climbed to number 39 on the Billboard Hot 100 and number one on Canada's RPM country chart.

== Track listing ==
Side one
No.	Title	Writer(s)	Length
1.	"No Charge"	Harlan Howard	3:10
2.	"I Think I'd Like to Love Again"	Larry Ballard	2:28
3.	"Then to Now"	Sorrelis Pickard	2:12
4.	"My Feel Good Sure Feels Fine"	Melba Montgomery; Jack Solomon	2:07
5.	"Loving You (Was All I Ever Needed)"	Stan Kesler; Bobby Wood	2:29
6.	"How Are Things in Tulsa"	Dave Kirby; Curly Putman	3:26

Side two
No.	Title	Writer(s)	Length
1.	"Hickman County Blues"	David Allan Coe	2:36
2.	"Country Child"	"Wild" Bill Emerson	2:59
3.	"Stay Til I Don't Love You Anymore"	Johnny Virgin	2:59
4.	"I Can't Move No Mountain"	Danny Samson; Ruby VanNoy	2:46
5.	"I'll Give You All of Me Then"	Buzz Rabin	2:41
6.	"Love, I Need You"	Montgomery; Solomon	3:18

== Personnel ==
All credits are adapted from the liner notes of No Charge.

Musical personnel

- Tommy Allsup – Bass guitar
- Harold Bradley – Acoustic guitar
- Johnny Gimble – Fiddle
- Buddy Harman – Drums
- David Kirby – Lead guitar
- Shorty Lavender – Fiddle
- Melba Montgomery – Lead vocals
- The Nashville Edition – Background vocals
- Gary S. Paxton Singers – Background vocals
- Hargus "Pig" Robbins – Piano
- Larry Sasser – Drums
- Buddy Spicher – Fiddle
- Jack Solomon – Acoustic guitar

Technical personnel

- Joel Brodsky – Cover photography
- Glen Christensen – Art direction
- Pete Drake – Producer
- Terry Dunavan – Mastering
- Stan Kesler – Engineering

== Charts ==
Chart (1974)	Peak position
US Top Country Albums (Billboard)	14

== Release history ==
Region	Date	Format	Label	Ref.
North America	April 1974	Vinyl	Elektra Records	
