= Don't Let the Good Times Fool You =

Don’t Let the Good Times Fool You

Studio album by Melba Montgomery
- Released: March 17, 1975
- Recorded: May 1974
- Studio: Pete's Place
- Genre: Country
- Label: Elektra Records
- Producer: Pete Drake

Melba Montgomery chronology
No Charge (1974)	Don’t Let the Good Times Fool You (1975)	The Greatest Gift of All (1975)

Singles from Don't Let the Good Times Fool You
- 1. "Your Pretty Roses Came Too Late" Released: July 1974; 2. "If You Want the Rainbow" Released: October 1974; 3. "Don't Let the Good Times Fool You" Released: January 1975; 4. "Searchin' (For Someone Like You)" Released: May 1975

Don’t Let the Good Times Fool You is a studio album by American country artist, Melba Montgomery. It was released March 17, 1975 via Elektra Records and was the twentieth studio album in her recording career. The disc contained 11 tracks featuring mostly original material, some of which was penned by Montgomery herself. Four singles were included, which all placed on the country charts. Among them was the title track, which reached the top 20 in 1975. The album itself also charted on the American country albums survey in 1975. It received a positive review from Billboard magazine following its release.

== Background, recording and content ==
Previously known for her sixties duet recordings with George Jones, Melba Montgomery established herself as a solo artist during the seventies. In 1974, she topped the country charts with a song about motherhood called "No Charge". Her solo commercial success came from a new recording contract with Elektra Records, which would continue releasing her music through the mid seventies. Montgomery followed the success of "No Charge" with her next studio album called Don't Let the Good Times Fool You. The album was recorded in May 1974 at Pete's Place, a studio located in Nashville, Tennessee. The studio was owned by the album's producer, Pete Drake.

Don't Let the Good Times Fool You consisted of 11 tracks. The title track, for which the album was named for was among several recordings that were original material. Two of the original tracks on the project were penned by Montgomery herself: "Hiding in the Darkness of My Mind" and "It Sure Gets Lonely". The disc also featured writing credits from Montgomery's brother (and established Nashville songwriter) Earl Montgomery. Other tracks were covers such as "I'll Be Your Lady", which was originally recorded by (and written by) David Allan Coe. His version was originally called "Would You Be My Lady" and it reached number 91 on the Billboard country chart in 1975. Montgomery also covered Kitty Wells's 1956 top five country single, "Searchin' (For Someone Like You)".

== Release, chart performance, reception and singles ==
Don't Let the Good Times Fool You was released in April 1975 on Elektra Records. It was Montgomery's twentieth studio album released in her recording career and her third with Elektra. The label issued it originally as both a vinyl LP and as a cassette. Following its release, the disc reached number 47 on the American Billboard Top Country Albums chart. It was Montgomery's second (and final) solo studio album to make the country albums chart. In their 1975 review, Billboard magazine called the disc "an excellent album" and the title track "a smash single".

The album was preceded by the release of three singles. Its first was "Your Pretty Roses Came Too Late" in July 1974. Despite the commercial success of "No Charge", the new single only climbed to number 67 on the Billboard Hot Country Songs chart. It was followed in October 1974 by the release of the second single titled "If You Want the Rainbow". However, the song only reached number 59 on the Hot Country Songs chart. The title track was released as the third single in January 1975 and proved to be the only commercial success from the album. It reached number 15 on the Billboard country chart and number 14 on Canada's RPM Country Tracks survey. The fourth and final single was "Searchin' (For Someone Like You)", which only reached number 45 on the Billboard country chart in 1975.

== Track listing ==
Side one
No.	Title	Writer(s)	Length
1.	"Don't Let the Good Times Fool You"	Ronald Hellard; Gary S. Paxton	3:09
2.	"Searchin' (For Someone Like You)"	Murphy M. Maddux	2:15
3.	"It Sure Gets Lonely"	Melba Montgomery; Jack Salomon	2:24
4.	"Hiding in the Darkness of My Mind"	M. Montgomery; Earl Montgomery	3:29
5.	"Your Pretty Roses Came Too Late"	Jerry Foster; Bill Rice	2:45
6.	"He Don't Make Me Cry"	Sorrells Pickard	2:43

Side two
No.	Title	Writer(s)	Length
1.	"I'll Be Your Lady"	David Allan Coe	3:20
2.	"I Hope I Never Have to Sing That Song"	Danny Hice; Ruby Hice	3:08
3.	"If You Want the Rainbow"	Harlan Howard	3:23
4.	"Give a Little Love Away"	Emily Mitchell; E. Montgomery	2:20
5.	"Mama's Hands"	Frank Dycus; Larry Kingston	2:35

== Personnel ==
All credited are adapted from the liner notes of Don't Let the Good Times Fool You.

Musical personnel

- Bass: Bob Moore, Henry Strzelecki
- Drums: Buddy Harman, Kenny Malone
- Piano: Hargus "Pig" Robbins, Ron Oates
- Lead Guitar: Pete Wade, Reggie Young
- Acoustic Guitar: Jack Solomon, Larry Black
- Steel Guitar: Larry Sasser, Pete Drake
- Bass Guitar: Harold Bradley, Tommy Allsup
- Fiddles: Buddy Spicher, Duane Hester, Gary Van Osdale, George Binkley, Sheldon Kurland, Larry Haight
- Vocals: The Jordanaires & La Verna, Garry S. Paxton Singers

Technical personnel

- Producer: Pete Drake for Pete Drake Productions Inc.
- Recorded at: Pete’s Place, Nashville, Tenn.
- Engineer: Stan Kesler
- Mixer: Pete Drake
- Recorders: Warren Peterson, Linda Hargrove
- Arranger: Pete Drake
- Album Art Direction: Glen Christensen
- Album Design: Gribitt
- Album Photography: Joel Brodsky

== Charts ==
Chart (1975)	Peak position
US Top Country Albums (Billboard)	47

== Release history ==
Region	Date	Format	Label	Ref.
North America	April 1975	Vinyl; cassette	Elektra Records	
United Kingdom	April 1975	Vinyl	Elektra Records	
