= Melba Montgomery (1973 album) =

Studio album by Melba Montgomery
- Released: October 1973
- Recorded: August 1973
- Studio: Pete's Place
- Genre: Country
- Label: Elektra
- Producer: Pete Drake

Melba Montgomery chronology
Baby, You've Got What It Takes (1971)	Melba Montgomery (1973)	No Charge (1974)

Singles from Melba Montgomery
- 1. "Wrap Your Love Around Me" Released: September 1973; 2. "He'll Come Home" Released: January 1974

Melba Montgomery is a self-titled studio album by American country artist, Melba Montgomery. It was released in October 1973 via Elektra Records and contained 12 tracks. The disc was Montgomery's first with the Elektra label and eighteenth album overall. Material on the album mixed both uptempo numbers with ballads. New selections along with cover songs were included. The album included two singles. The first single, "Wrap Your Love Around Me", reached the top 40 of the American country songs chart in 1973. The album received positive reception from Billboard magazine following its release.

== Background, recording and content ==
Melba Montgomery had become known as a duet partner of country artists Charlie Louvin, Gene Pitney and George Jones. Up to that point her most successful single was the Jones duet, "We Must Have Been Out of Our Minds". Her solo career was overlooked by her duet success up to that point. While on the Capitol label recording with Charlie Louvin, she was produced by Pete Drake. When Drake moved to Elektra Records, he helped Montgomery secure a contract with the label in 1973. It was at Elektra that her solo career would become successful. In 1973, it was announced that Montgomery's first Elektra album would be promoted with a series of new label recordings at an event in New York City. The disc was recorded one month prior at Pete's Place, a studio in Nashville, Tennessee owned by the album's producer, Pete Drake.

The disc consisted of 12 tracks.The album mixed both up-tempo songs with slower ballads. Among the song's ballads were covers of Jeanne Pruett's "Satin Sheets" and Kris Kristofferson's number one single, "Why Me". Both songs topped the country charts by their original artists. A third cover was the up-tempo "Blood Red and Goin' Down" (first a chart-topping single by Tanya Tucker). Other songs were new recordings, three of which were composed by Montgomery herself: the title track, "Let Me Show You How I Can" and "I Love Him Because He's That Way".

== Release, reception and singles ==
Melba Montgomery was released in October 1973 on Elektra Records. It was Montgomery's first full-length album release with Elektra and her eighteenth album overall. It was distributed as a vinyl LP, with six songs on either side of the record. The disc received a positive response from Billboard, which named it among its "Top Album Picks" in October 1973. "She's picked excellent material, ranging from the softest ballad to rockin' country, and sings them all to perfection," they concluded. Two singles were included on the album. The first was "Wrap Your Love Around Me", which was issued as the lead single in September 1973. The song reached number 38 on the American Billboard Hot Country Songs chart in late 1973. It was followed by the release of the second single in January 1974 titled, "He'll Come Home". The single peaked at number 58 on the Billboard country chart in early 1974. Both singles also reached number 47 respectively on the Canadian RPM Country Tracks chart.

== Track listing ==
Side one
No.	Title	Writer(s)	Length
1.	"Wrap Your Love Around Me"	Melba Montgomery; Jack Salomon	2:25
2.	"Papa Was Kind"	Linda Hargrove	2:11
3.	"See No Evil"	Randy Lee	3:02
4.	"Hands Off"	McShann-Bowman	2:17
5.	"I Love Him Because He's That Way"	Lorene Allen; Montgomery	2:47
6.	"Blood Red and Goin' Down"	Curly Putman	2:58

Side two
No.	Title	Writer(s)	Length
1.	"Country Written Up and Down Her Face"	Sorrelis Pickard	3:58
2.	"Keep Me Warm"	Hargrove	2:51
3.	"Let Me Show You How I Can"	Montgomery	2:59
4.	"He'll Come Home"	Danny Samson; Ruby Van Noy	3:02
5.	"Satin Sheets"	John Volinkaty	3:06
6.	"Why Me"	Kris Kristofferson	3:16

== Personnel ==
All credits are adapted from the liner notes of Melba Montgomery.

Musical personnel

- Tommy Allsup – Bass guitar
- Earl Ball – Piano
- Harold Bradley – Acoustic guitar
- Jim Buchanan – Fiddle
- Jerry Carrigan – Drums
- Tommy Cogbill – Bass
- Pete Drake – Steel guitar
- D. J. Fontana – Drums
- Al Gore – Recorder
- Lloyd Green – Steel guitar
- Buddy Harman – Drums
- Linda Hargrove – Recorder
- David Kirby – Lead guitar
- Hank Levine – Strings
- Melba Montgomery – Lead vocals
- Bob Moore – Bass
- Weldon Myrick – Steel guitar
- The Nashville Edition – Background vocals
- Gary S. Paxton Singers – Background vocals
- Hargus "Pig" Robbins – Piano
- Larry Sasser – Steel guitar
- Dale Sellers – Lead guitar
- Jerry Smith – Piano
- Buddy Spicher – Fiddle
- Jack Solomon – Acoustic guitar
- Pete Wade – Lead guitar

Technical personnel

- Frank Bez – Photography
- Glen Christensen – Art direction
- Pete Drake – Arrangement, producer
- Robert L. Heimall – Art direction, design
- Scotty Moore – Engineering
- Stan Kesler – Engineering
- TD – Lacquer cut

== Release history ==
Region	Date	Format	Label	Ref.
North America	October 1973	Vinyl	Elektra Records	
