= What's in Our Heart (song) =

Single by George Jones and Melba Montgomery

from the album What's in Our Heart
- A-side: "Let's Invite Them Over"
- Released: September 1963
- Recorded: May 23, 1963; Nashville, Tennessee, U.S.
- Genre: Country
- Label: United Artists
- Songwriters: George Jones; Johnny "Country" Mathis
- Producer: Pappy Daily

George Jones and Melba Montgomery singles chronology
"We Must Have Been Out of Our Minds" (1963)	""Let's Invite Them Over" / "What's in Our Heart"" (1963)	"Suppose Tonight Would Be Our Last" (1964)

"What's in Our Heart" is a song written by George Jones and Johnny "Country" Mathis. It was recorded and released as a B-side duet by American country artists George Jones (the song's co-writer) and Melba Montgomery. It was recorded at the Columbia Recording Studio, located in Nashville, Tennessee, United States on May 23, 1963. The recording date was the second session that took place between Jones and Montgomery. Other songs included on the session were "Let's Invite Them Over", "Suppose Tonight Would Be Our Last", and "I Let You Go". The recording session included The Nashville A-Team of musicians, whom appeared on other recordings by the pair. The session was produced by Pappy Daily. "What's in Our Heart" was issued as the B-side to the pair's 1963 single "Let's Invite Them Over". The song received radio airplay and reached the twentieth position on the Billboard Magazine Hot Country Singles list. It became the duo's third major hit single together.

== Chart performance ==
Chart (1963)	Peak position
U.S. Billboard Hot Country Singles	20
