= J. J. Barrie =

Canadian musician (1933–2026)

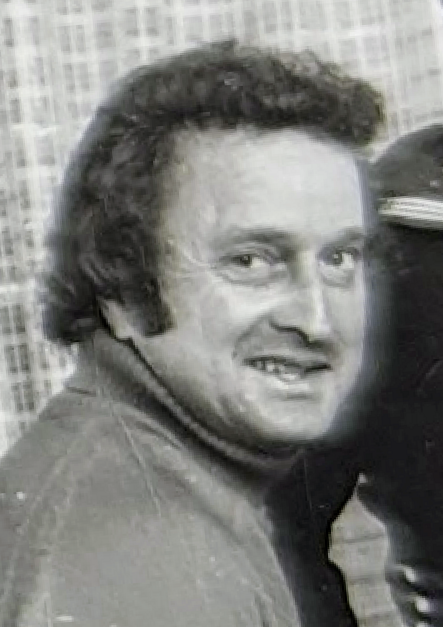
- J. J. Barrie, in 1976

Background information
- Born: Barry Authors; July 7, 1933; Oshawa, Ontario, Canada
- Died: May 10, 2026 (aged 92) Newmarket, Ontario, Canada
- Genres: Country; pop
- Occupations: Singer; songwriter; comedian
- Instrument: Vocals
- Works: Albums; singles
- Years active: 1960s–1980s
- Label: Power Exchange

Barry Jackson Authors (July 7, 1933 – May 10, 2026), known professionally as J. J. Barrie, was a Canadian songwriter, singer and comedian. He is best known for his 1976 UK chart-topper "No Charge".

== Life and career ==
Barry Jackson Authors was born in Oshawa, Ontario, Canada on July 7, 1933.

Originally a Blue Mink and Ocean manager, and comedian of the famed duo "Authors and Swinson", Barrie turned to songwriting and in early 1976 co-wrote "Where's The Reason" with Terry Britten for Glen Campbell. They sent a demo to Campbell's producer, but he suggested Barrie record it. This he did, but it was unsuccessful. Undaunted, Barrie recorded a cover version of the country ballad "No Charge", penned by Harlan Howard, on Barrie's own label, Power Exchange. The track featured an uncredited vocal from Vicki Brown (wife of Joe Brown, and one-time member of both The Vernons Girls and The Breakaways), and was produced by Bill Amesbury. The single reached Number 1 in the UK Singles Chart in June 1976, where it remained for one week. The track spent eleven weeks in the chart.

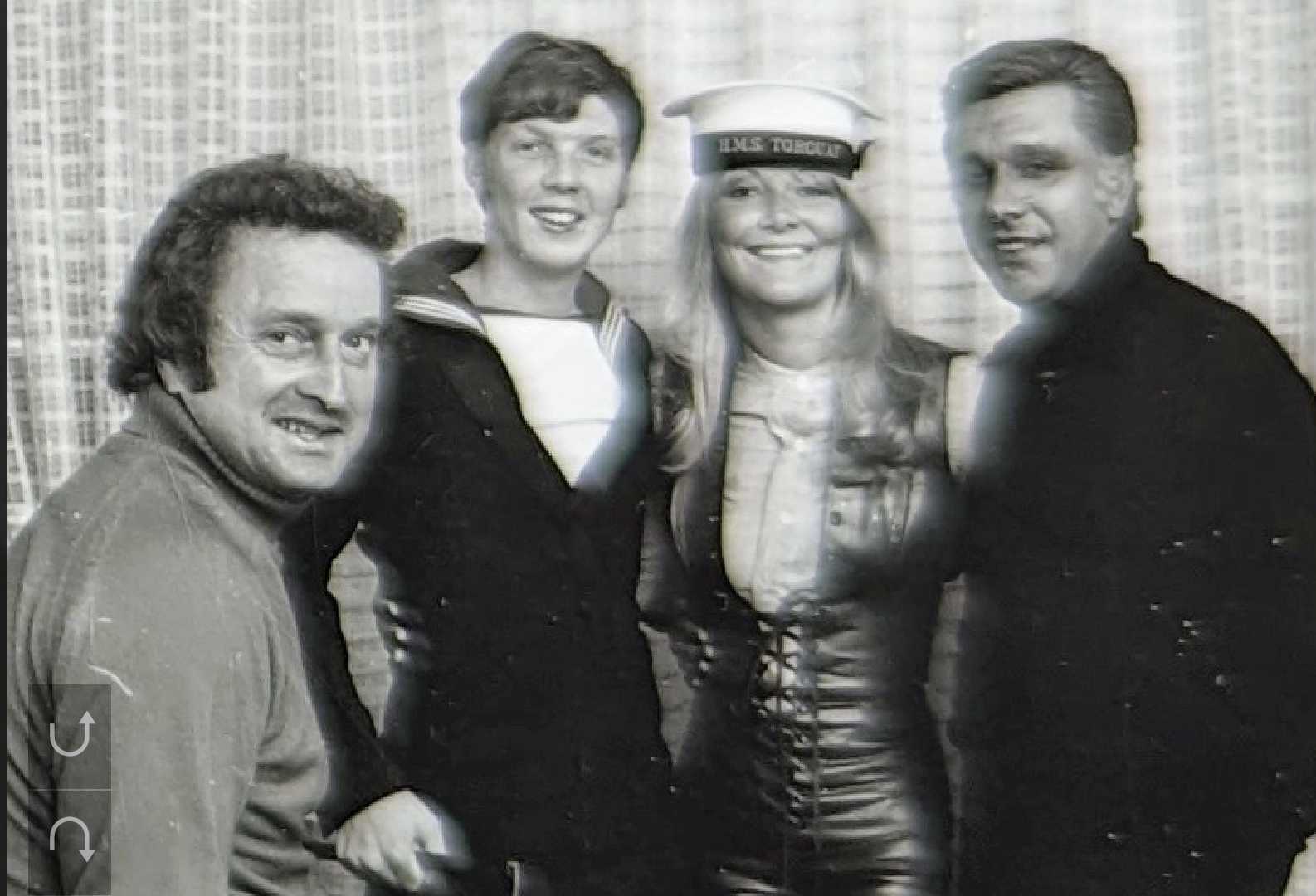
J.J. Barrie (left) during a promotional event for "No Charge" at Power Exchange Records, London (1976)

The session musician Clem Cattini played the drums of "No Charge", one of his forty five UK number one hit appearances on record. Billy Connolly's 1976 Top 40 hit, "No Chance (No Charge)", was a spoof version of Barrie's chart-topper.

Barrie re-released "Where's The Reason" as a follow-up but it again failed to chart. Power Exchange had one other UK Top 20 hit single – "Who's Gonna Love Me" by The Imperials (without Little Anthony) in December 1977 – after which the label ceased trading. Barrie returned to Canada and tried to resume music publishing, artist management and agency representation – his former jobs during the 1960s. In 1980, he returned to the UK to record his own track, "You Can't Win 'Em All" b/w "It's Only A Game" – with the then Nottingham Forest F.C. manager Brian Clough – which was released on MCA late in the year. However, without any further chart presence in the UK, he remains labelled as a one-hit wonder. He released two albums for RCA, My Son and Dreamin', and another single, also called "My Son".

Barrie's erstwhile recording partner, Vicki Brown, died of cancer on June 16, 1991.

In 1999, an album, titled No Charge was issued on Start Records.

Barrie released a UK compilation album in 2011 through the Demon Music Group, called No Charge. In the US, a new download only album, is Especially for You.

Barrie died at the Margaret Bahen Hospice in Newmarket, Ontario, on May 10, 2026, at the age of 92.

He is not to be confused with J. J. Barrie (author and novelist of To Steal a Lady and To Kill a Priest).

== Discography ==
=== Albums ===
Year	Title	Label
1976	The Autumn of My Life	Power Exchange
1977	Did I Forget to Say Thank You	Power Exchange
1978	Call My Name	RCA
1980	You Can't Win 'Em All	RCA
1983	Sings Songs from Fraggle Rock	Cherry Lane
1999	No Charge	Start
2017	My Canada	Angel Air

=== Singles ===
Year	Title	UK	AU	SA	CA	NZ
1976	"No Charge"	1	29	2	39	16
1976	"So Long Bing"	–	–	–	–	–
1976	"Boys Will Be Boys"	–	–	–	–	–
1977	"Top Ten Fool"	–	–	–	–	–
1978	"Call My Name"	–	–	–	–	–
1980	"You Can't Win 'Em All" (with Brian Clough)	–	–	–	–	–
1983	"My Son"	96	–	–	–	–

== See also ==
- One-hit wonders in the United Kingdom
