= Bluegrass Hootenanny =

Studio album by George Jones, Melba Montgomery
- Released: March 1964
- Recorded: January 1964
- Studio: Columbia Recording Studio, Nashville, Tennessee
- Genre: Country
- Length: 27:33
- Label: United Artists
- Producer: Pappy Daily

George Jones chronology
A King & Two Queens (1964)	Bluegrass Hootenanny (1964)	Famous Country Duets (1965)

Melba Montgomery chronology
America's Number One Country and Western Girl Singer (1964)	Bluegrass Hootenanny (1964)	Down Home (1964)

Professional ratings
Review scores
Source	Rating
AllMusic	2/5 stars

Bluegrass Hootenanny is an album by American country music artists George Jones and Melba Montgomery released in March 1964 on the United Artists Records.

== Background ==
Bluegrass Hootenanny consisted of twelve duets and was the second duet album by Jones and Montgomery, the first being the bluegrass-tinged Singing What's in Our Heart. As the title implies, this second Jones/Montgomery collection brings this sound into focus, a departure of sorts for Jones, who was known primarily for his hardcore honky tonk sound and soulful ballad singing. The album features several bluegrass interpretations of classic country songs written by Bill Monroe, Lester Flatt, and Hank Williams. Jones co-wrote two songs with Johnny Mathis, the rollicking "Jump in the Mississippi" and the plaintive "I'd Dreamed My Baby Came Home", while "Will There Ever Be Another" and "I'll Be There to Welcome You Home" were co-written by Montgomery. The album was a hit, reaching number 12 on the country albums chart.

Jones and Montgomery did tour together, with Jones confessing in his autobiography I Lived to Tell It All, "My affections for Melba surfaced almost immediately after we began working. But my drunkenness and the fact that I had a wife did little to make her want to commit to me." Jones also divulged that he had asked her to marry him but Montgomery had begun a relationship with Jones' guitar player Jack Solomon, who she later married.

== Track listing ==
No.	Title	Writer(s)	Length
1.	"Dixieland for Me"	Curtis McPeake, David Watkins	2:05
2.	"Once More"	Dusty Owens	2:18
3.	"Will There Ever Be Another"	Melba Montgomery, Carl Montgomery	2:22
4.	"I'd Jump the Mississippi"	George Jones, Johnny Mathis	2:19
5.	"Please Be My Love"	Monroe Fields, Carl Sauceman	2:29
6.	"I Dreamed My Baby Came Home"	Jones, Mathis	2:09
7.	"Rollin' in My Sweet Baby's Arms"	Lester Flatt	2:07
8.	"Blue Moon of Kentucky"	Bill Monroe	2:27
9.	"House of Gold"	Hank Williams	2:31
10.	"Wait a Little Longer, Please Jesus"	Hazel Houser, Chester Smith	2:18
11.	"I Can't Get Over You"	Joe Barber	2:16
12.	"I'll Be There to Welcome You Home"	Melba Montgomery, Carl Montgomery	2:05

== Personnel ==
- Joe Barber - Composer
- Monroe Fields - Composer
- Buddy Harman - Drums
- Hazel Houser - Composer
- Harold "Shot" Jackson - Dobro
- Tommy Jackson - Fiddle
- George Jones- Composer, Guitar, Primary Artist, Vocals
- Johnny "Country" Mathis - Composer
- Curtis McPeake - 5-string Banjo
- Bill Monroe - Composer
- Carl Montgomery - Composer
- Melba Montgomery - Composer, Primary Artist
- Bob Moore - Bass
- Dusty Owens - Composer
- Hargus "Pig" Robbins - Piano
- Carl Sauceman - Composer
- Chester Smith - Composer
- David Watkins - Composer
- Hank Williams - Composer
