= Famous Country Duets =

Compilation album by George Jones, Gene Pitney, Melba Montgomery
- Released: January 1966
- Recorded: 1965 at Columbia Studio, Nashville, TN
- Genre: Country
- Label: Musicor
- Producer: Pappy Daily

George Jones chronology
Bluegrass Hootenanny (1964)	Famous Country Duets (1965)	George Jones and Gene Pitney: For the First Time! Two Great Singers (1965)

Professional ratings
Review scores
Source	Rating
AllMusic	3/5 stars

Famous Country Duets is an album by American country music artist George Jones with Gene Pitney and Melba Montgomery of predominantly previously released performances. This album was released in January 1966 (see 1966 in country music) on the Musicor Records label.

== Background ==
Jones's producer H.W. "Pappy" Daily had been mentoring the singer's career since the late fifties and, as Jones star begin to rise through the early 1960s, pushing his career through an ever increasing number of lucrative record deals. This was Jones's first album with the Musicor label after leaving United Artists in 1965. As Bob Allen points out in his book George Jones: The Life and Times of a Honky Tonk Legend, "During the next six years, with Musicor, George recorded more than over 280 songs - most of which were done in rushed, sloppily produced sessions - and help to establish for himself a somewhat unwelcome reputation as one of country music's most overrecorded artists." Jones work with Musicor would also be increasingly characterized by the Nashville Sound that became prominent on country radio throughout the rest of the decade.

Jones had recorded two duet albums with Montgomery on United Artists: 1963's What's In Our Hearts and 1964's Bluegrass Hootenanny. Jones would record a duet album with rock and roll singer Gene Pitney in 1965 called For the First Time! Two Great Stars - George Jones and Gene Pitney. Famous Country Duets compiles duets by the singers, although there is no single track with all three singers performing.

== Track listing ==
1. "Baby Ain't That Fine" (Dallas Frazier)
2. "If I Were" (Earl Montgomery)
3. "I've Got a New Heartache" (Wayne P. Walker, Ray Price)
4. "I'm a People" (Dallas Frazier)
5. "That's All It Took" (George Jones. Darrell Edwards, Charlotte Grier)
6. "Simply Divine" (Melba Montgomery)
7. "Feudin' and Fightin'" (Larry Brittain)
8. "King and Queen" (Earl Montgomery)
9. "My Shoes Keep Walking Back to You" (Bob Wills, Lee Ross)
10. "I'm Looking for the Man" (Melba Montgomery, Earl Montgomery)
11. "Your Old Standby" (Jim Eanes, Wayne Perry)
12. "Being Together" (Melba Montgomery, Earl Montgomery)
