= Let's Invite Them Over =

Single by George Jones and Melba Montgomery

from the album What's in Our Heart
- B-side: "What's in Our Heart"
- Released: 1963
- Recorded: 1963; Nashville, Tennessee, U.S.
- Genre: Country
- Label: United Artists
- Songwriter: Onie Wheeler
- Producer: Pappy Daily

George Jones and Melba Montgomery singles chronology
"We Must Have Been Out of Our Minds" (1963)	"Let's Invite Them Over" (1963)	"Suppose Tonight Would Be Our Last" (1964)

"Let's Invite Them Over" is a song written by Onie Wheeler, which was recorded as a duet by American country artists George Jones and Melba Montgomery. The song was released as the pair's second single in 1963.

The ironic duet is sung in close harmony by a couple who are "not in love with each other, but in love with our best friends".

== Background ==
"Let's Invite Them Over" was recorded at the Columbia Recording Studio, located in Nashville, Tennessee, United States on May 23, 1963. The recording date was the second session that took place between Jones and Montgomery. Other songs included on the session were "What's in Our Heart", "Suppose Tonight Would Be Our Last", and "I Let You Go". The recording session included The Nashville A-Team of musicians, whom appeared on other recordings by the pair. The session was produced by Pappy Daily. It was issued as a single in September 1963 via United Artists Records. The song was the pair's follow-up single to the success of their previous, "We Must Have Been Out of Our Minds". The song reached the seventeenth position on the Billboard Magazine Hot Country Singles chart. It became the duo's second major hit single together. In the book George Jones: The Life and Times of a Honky Tonk Legend, Bob Allen quotes the singer: "Now, truthfully, Melba fit my style of singin' more than Tammy [Wynette] did. I hate to use the word 'hard-core', but that's what Melba is - a down-to-earth hard-core country singer."

In 1999 John Prine and Iris Dement released a version on Prine's 1999 duet album In Spite of Ourselves.

== Chart performance ==
Chart (1963)	Peak position
U.S. Billboard Hot Country Singles	17
