= How Can You Refuse Him Now =

Single by Hank Williams
- B-side: "A House of Gold"
- Released: 1954
- Recorded: 1950 (Unconfirmed)
- Genre: Country
- Length: 2:37
- Label: MGM Records
- Songwriter: Hank Williams

"How Can You Refuse Him Now" is a hymn written by Hank Williams and issued by MGM Records in 1954. The original recording is a demo that was likely recorded in 1950. The song describes Christ's suffering on the cross ("As they nailed his hands, he cried, 'They don't understand'...") and admonishes the listener for turning away from the Lord. Williams' first musical experiences came in the church, with the singer revealing in a 1952 interview with Ralph Gleason that was reprinted in Rolling Stone in 1969, "My mother was an organist at Mt. Olive, Alabama and my earliest memory is sittin' on that organ stool by her and hollerin'. I must have been five or six years old and louder than anybody else." The B-side to "How Can You Refuse Him Now" was "A House of Gold," another hymn that would prove to be far more popular in the long run, being recorded by many artists.

== Cover versions ==
- Hank's wife Audrey Williams cut the song for Decca in 1950.
- Porter Wagoner recorded the song for RCA in 1956.
- George Hamilton IV recorded the song for ABC Records in 1958.
- Hank Williams, Jr. cut the song in 1969.
- Holly Williams released a version of the song in 2004.
