= Floyd Chalmers =

Canadian editor, publisher and philanthropist

Floyd Sherman Chalmers
- Born: September 14, 1898; Chicago, Illinois, United States
- Died: April 26, 1993 (aged 94); Toronto, Ontario, Canada
- Known for: editor, publisher, and philanthropist
- Children: Joan Chalmers Wallace Chalmers
- Awards: Order of Canada; Order of Ontario

Floyd Sherman Chalmers, CC OOnt (September 14, 1898 – April 26, 1993) was a Canadian editor, publisher and philanthropist.

== Early life and career ==
Born in Chicago, Illinois, to Canadian parents, he was raised in Orillia and Toronto, Ontario. He worked for the Bank of Nova Scotia before serving with the First Canadian Tank Battalion during World War I.

Chalmers married Jean Chalmers, née Boxall, in 1921. They had a son, Wallace Chalmers, in 1923, and a daughter, Joan Chalmers, born May 30, 1928.

From the 1930s on, Floyd and Joan Chalmers became supporters of the arts in Canada, helping establish the Toronto Symphony Orchestra, the Canadian Opera Company, and the Stratford Festival, among other arts organizations.

Chalmers first established his subsequent career in publishing as editor of the battalion's newsletter, and joined the Financial Post as a reporter in 1919. Appointed chief editor of the Financial Post in 1925, he later became president of Maclean-Hunter from 1952 to 1964 and chairman of the board until 1969. In 1964, Maclean-Hunter went public and Chalmers sold half his shares.

== Later career ==
From 1968 to 1973, he was appointed chancellor of York University. As a philanthropist, he served on the board of the Toronto Conservatory of Music; endowed the Floyd S. Chalmers Canadian Play Awards, one of Canada's most prominent literary awards for playwrights; and created the Encyclopedia of Music in Canada. He commissioned an opera for Canada's centennial in 1967, written by Mavor Moore and composed by Harry Somers.

He wrote Codes for Canada (1934), A Gentleman of the Press (1969), a biography of John Bayne Maclean, and Both Sides of the Street: One Man’s Life in Business and the Arts in Canada (1983), an autobiography. He founded The Ticker Club in 1929 which was a luncheon club to give business founders and thought leaders the opportunity to address the financial community.

In 1967 he was made an Officer of the Order of Canada and was promoted to Companion in 1984.

Academic offices
Preceded by Wilfred Curtis	Chancellor of York University; 1968–1973	Succeeded by Walter L. Gordon
