= Joan Chalmers =

Margaret Joan Chalmers
- Born: May 30, 1928; Toronto, Ontario, Canada
- Died: December 2, 2016 (aged 88); Toronto, Ontario, Canada
- Awards: Order of Canada; Order of Ontario

Margaret Joan Chalmers, CC OOnt D.F.A. L.L. D. (May 30, 1928 – December 2, 2016) was a Canadian philanthropist and supporter of the arts.

== Biography ==
Born in Toronto, Ontario, to Floyd and Jean Chalmers, she attended school in Toronto, then went to the Ontario College of Art. Upon graduating she became a Visual Arts Director at Canadian Homes and Gardens and Chatelaine magazine. She co-founded the Ontario Crafts Council and the Canadian Crafts Council in the 1970s and generously promoted and supported organizations such as Toronto's Harbourfront Centre, the Young People's Theatre and the M. Joan Chalmers Cultural Center in Ottawa. Chalmers also served on the boards of the Ontario Arts Council Foundation, the Stratford Festival, the World Crafts Council, Aid to Artisans, and the Glenn Gould Foundation (1983-2004).

In 1972, she and her parents, founded the annual Chalmers Awards, which donates $25,000 CAD to artists in dance, theatre, crafts, film, the visual arts and music.

She was involved with the travelling exhibit, Survivors in Search of a Voice: The Art of Courage, which as a collaboration among 24 prominent Canadian women artists and over 100 breast cancer survivors.

While celebrating her 70th birthday in 1998, she announced that she would provide 20 arts groups with a total of $1 million in funding.

Chalmers was the partner of former singer-songwriter Barbra Amesbury.

She died on December 2, 2016, in Toronto, from injuries suffered in a fall.

== Honours ==
- In 1985 Ms Chalmers received the Diplôme d'Honneur from the Canadian Conference of the Arts
- In 1987 she was made a Member of the Order of Canada.
- In 1987 she was awarded a Doctor of Fine Arts, honoris causa from NSCAD University.
- In 1992 she was promoted to Officer of the Order of Canada.
- In 1993 she received the Ramon John Hnatyshyn (RJH) Award for Voluntarism in the Performing Arts.
- In 1994 she was awarded the Order of Ontario.
- In 1994 she was awarded an honorary Doctor of Law from the University of Waterloo.
- In 1997 she was promoted to Companion of the Order of Canada.
- In 2001 she received the Governor General's Award for Visual and Media Arts in the Outstanding Contribution category.
