= Judy Lynn =

American country singer-songwriter (1936–2010)

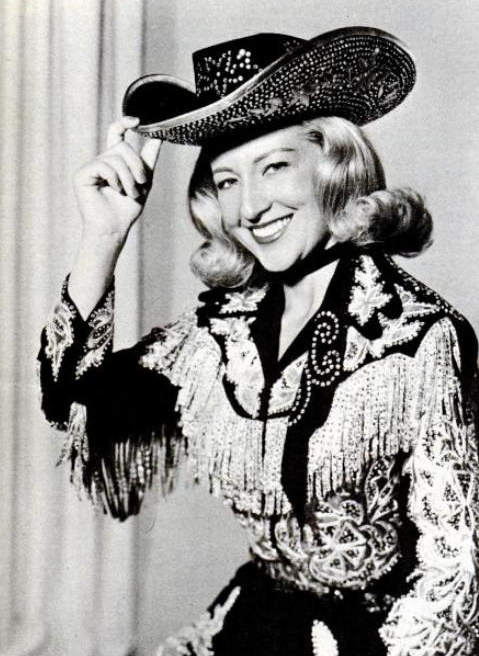
- Lynn in 1968

Background information
- Born: Judy Lynn Voiten; April 16, 1936; Boise, Idaho, U.S.
- Died: May 26, 2010 (aged 74) Jeffersonville, Indiana, U.S.

Judy Lynn Kelly (née Voiten; April 16, 1936 – May 26, 2010) was an American country music singer and beauty queen who was crowned Miss Idaho in 1955.

== Life and career ==
Lynn was born in Boise, Idaho, United States. As a teenager she joined a nationwide tour of Grand Ole Opry performers. She was hired to fill in for Jean Shepard, who had become ill during the tour.

Lynn married her manager shortly thereafter. For more than 20 years, she performed a country music residency on the Las Vegas Strip, often wearing signature Nudie-style costumes.

In 1951, Lynn starred in the Broadway musical Top Banana and its film adaptation, alongside comedic actor Phil Silvers who won a Tony Award for his performance.

== Death ==
Lynn retired from the music business in 1980 to become a Christian minister. She died on May 26, 2010, after suffering congestive heart failure at her home in Jeffersonville, Indiana.

== Discography ==
=== Albums ===
Year	Album	US Country	Label
1962	Judy Lynn at the Golden Nugget	—	United Artists
1963	Here Is Our Girl	—	United Artists
1964	America's Number One Most Promising; Country and Western Girl Singer	—	United Artists
1964	A King & Two Queens (with George Jones and Melba Montgomery)	—	United Artists
1965	The Judy Lynn Show	14	United Artists
1965	The Judy Lynn Show, Act 2	—	United Artists
1966	The Best of Judy Lynn	—	United Artists
1966	The Judy Lynn Show Plays Again	—	Musicor
1967	Honey Stuff	—	Musicor
1967	Golden Nuggets	—	Musicor
1969	Judy Lynn Sings at Caesar's Palace	—	Columbia
1971	Parts of Love	—	Amaret
1973	Naturally	—	Amaret
1975	Judy Lynn Sings Her Most Requested Songs	—	Sunset

=== Singles ===
Year	Single	US Country	Album
1952	"Riverboat Rag"	—	singles only
1952	"Pretty Bride"	—	singles only
1952	"I Cried for You"	—	singles only
1952	"Baby Come Home"	—	singles only
1952	"Do, Baby, Do"	—	singles only
1953	"Satin Pillows"	—	singles only
1953	"Alexander's Ragtime Band" (with Alan Dale)	—	singles only
1953	"Tinsel and Joy" (with Alan Dale)	—	singles only
1956	"I Slipped Off My Wedding Ring"	—	singles only
1958	"See If I Care"	—	singles only
1961	"Count Up to Ten Little Heart"	—	singles only
1962	"Footsteps of a Fool"	7	Judy Lynn at the Golden Nugget
1962	"My Secret"	29	Judy Lynn at the Golden Nugget
1963	"My Father's Voice"	16	Judy Lynn at the Golden Nugget
1963	"Oh, Why Can't He Forget Her"	—	Here's Our Gal
1963	"I Make Excuses"	—	Here's Our Gal
1964	"My Tears Are on the Roses"	—	America's Number One Most Promising; Country and Western Girl Singer
1964	"I'm Making Plans"	—	single only
1965	"Antique in My Closet"	—	America's Number One Most Promising; Country and Western Girl Singer
1965	"The Letter"	—	America's Number One Most Promising; Country and Western Girl Singer
1965	"Hello Mister D.J."	—	The Best of Judy Lynn
1966	"Golden Nugget"	—	The Judy Lynn Show Plays Again
1966	"That Was in the Deal" (with Benny Barnes)	—	The Judy Lynn Show Plays Again
1966	"Moment of Silence"	—	The Judy Lynn Show Plays Again
1966	"Do I Look Like I Got?"	—	single only
1967	"Little Shoes"	—	Golden Nuggets
1967	"Lost My Wings Last Night"	—	singles only
1967	"Lonely Came to Visit"	—	singles only
1967	"On Smoke, Not Fire"	—	Golden Nuggets
1967	"Evil on Your Mind"	—	singles only
1968	"Cheatin' Traces" (with Benny Barnes)	—	singles only
1968	"Green Paper"	—	singles only
1968	"Our Little Man" (with Melba Montgomery)	—	singles only
1968	"Bring the Woman Out in Me"	—	singles only
1969	"Bull by the Tail"	—	singles only
1969	"America, the Beautiful"	—	Judy Lynn Sings at Caesar's Palace
1971	"Married to a Memory"^{A}	74	Parts of Love
1971	"When the Love Stars to Come"	—	Parts of Love
1971	"Parts of Love"	—	Parts of Love
1972	"Winterwood"	—	Naturally
1972	"Give Me Something to Believe"	—	Naturally
1972	"Pour Me a Little More Wine"	—	Naturally
1973	"I'll Never Sing You a Sad Song"	—	Naturally
1973	"I've Never Been a Fool Like This Before"	—	singles only
1974	"Padre"	92	singles only
1975	"Burden of Freedom"	—	singles only
1977	"In the Beginning"	—	singles only

- ^{A} "Married to a Memory" also peaked at number 4 on the Bubbling Under Hot 100 Singles chart and number 42 on the Canadian RPM Country Tracks chart. It also charted at #18 on the Billboard AC charts.

Preceded by LaVonne Skalsky	Miss Idaho; 1955	Succeeded by Gail Rupp
