= Don't Let the Good Times Fool You (song) =

Single by Melba Montgomery

from the album Don't Let the Good Times Fool You
- B-side: "It Sure Gets Lonely"
- Released: January 1975
- Recorded: May 1974; Nashville, Tennessee, U.S.
- Genre: Country
- Label: Elektra
- Songwriters: Ronald Hellard; Gary S. Paxton
- Producer: Pete Drake

Melba Montgomery singles chronology
"If You Want the Rainbow" (1974)	"Don't Let the Good Times Fool You" (1975)	"Searchin' (For Someone Like You)" (1975)

"Don't Let the Good Times Fool You" is a song written by Ronald Hellard and Gary S. Paxton. It was recorded and released as a single by American country artist Melba Montgomery in 1975.

"Don't Let the Good Times Fool You" was recorded at "Pete's Place", a recording studio located in Nashville, Tennessee, United States in May 1974. The session included The Nashville A-Team of musicians, such as Harold Bradley and Buddy Harman. The session was produced by Pete Drake.

"Don't Let the Good Times Fool You" was released as a single via Elektra Records in January 1975. The song reached number fifteen on the Billboard Magazine Hot Country Singles chart and number fourteen on the Canadian RPM Country Songs chart. The song became Montgomery's second major hit as a solo artist and her seventh top-twenty hit on the country songs chart. The song was issued onto Montgomery's 1975 album of the same name, also on Elektra Records.

In 1980, it was covered by American recording artist Wanda Jackson. Her version was released as a single on the Deep Sea Music label the same year.

== Charts ==
Chart (1975)	Peak position
Canada Country Songs (RPM)	14
US Hot Country Singles (Billboard)	15
