= Something to Brag About =

Single by Charlie Louvin and Melba Montgomery

from the album Something to Brag About
- B-side: "Let's Help Each to Forget (Then Let's Forget Each Other)"
- Released: September 1970
- Recorded: July 15, 1970
- Studio: Jack Clement Recording (Nashville, Tennessee)
- Genre: Country
- Label: Capitol
- Songwriter: Bobby Braddock
- Producer: George Richey

Charlie Louvin and Melba Montgomery singles chronology
"Something to Brag About" (1970)	"Did You Ever" (1971)

"Something to Brag About" is a song written by Bobby Braddock that was recorded as a duet between American country artists Charlie Louvin and Melba Montgomery. It was also issued as a single in 1970.

"Something to Brag About" was originally recorded at the Jack Clement Recording Studio on July 15, 1970. It was Louvin's and Montgomery's first recording date together and the session also included several other duets between the two including "New Dreams and Sunshine". The session was produced by George Richey.

The song was released as a single via Capitol Records in September 1970. It peaked at number eighteen on the Billboard Magazine Hot Country Singles chart in early 1971, becoming the pair's first and only major hit recording together. It was issued onto an album of the same name in 1971. Additionally, the song peaked at number twenty six on the Canadian RPM Country Songs chart.

The song has been covered as a duet several times. George Jones & Tammy Wynette released it in 1971 on their album, We Go Together. David Houston & Barbara Mandrell covered it on their 1972 album, A Perfect Match. Willie Nelson and Mary Kay Place covered it on season 3, episode 7 of Saturday Night Live. Jesse Dayton & Brennen Leigh covered it on their 2007 album, Holdin' Our Own.

== Chart performance ==
Chart (1970–1971)	Peak position
U.S. Billboard Hot Country Singles	18
Canadian RPM Country Songs	26
