= Close Together (As You and Me) =

Studio album by George Jones and Melba Montgomery
- Released: November 1966
- Genre: Country
- Label: Musicor Records
- Producer: Pappy Daily

George Jones chronology
It's Country Time Again! (1966)	Close Together (As You and Me) (1966)	We Go Together (1972)

Close Together (As You and Me) is an album of duets and solo selections by George Jones and Melba Montgomery. It was released on the Musicor label in November 1966.

== Track listing ==
1. "Close Together (As You and Me)" (Earl Montgomery) (Duet)
2. "From Here To The Door" (Don Chapel) (George solo)
3. "Living On Easy Street" (Earl Montgomery, Melba Montgomery) (Duet)
4. "As of Now" (Earl Montgomery, Melba Montgomery) (Melba solo)
5. "Feudin' and Fightin'" (Larry Brittain) (Duet)
6. "Long As We're Dreaming" (Earl Montgomery) (Duet)
7. "Developing My Pictures" (Earl Montgomery)(George solo)
8. "Let's Both Have A Cry" (Dallas Frazier, A. L. "Doodle" Owens) (Duet)
9. "Heartaches for a Day" (Carl Montgomery, Melba Montgomery) (Melba solo)
10. "Simply Divine" (Melba Montgomery) (Duet)
