= Baby Ain't That Fine =

Single by Melba Montgomery and Gene Pitney

from the album Being Together
- B-side: "Everybody Knows But You"
- Released: November 1965
- Recorded: October 1965; Nashville, Tennessee, U.S.
- Genre: Country
- Label: Musicor
- Songwriter: Dallas Frazier
- Producer: Pappy Daily

Melba Montgomery and Gene Pitney singles chronology
"Baby Ain't That Fine" (1965)	"Being Together" (1965)

"Baby Ain't That Fine" is a song written by Dallas Frazier that was recorded as a duet between American country artists Melba Montgomery and Gene Pitney. The song was also released as a single in 1965.

"Baby Ain't That Fine" was recorded in October 1965 in Nashville, Tennessee, United States. The session was produced by Pappy Daily. It was the first recording session to take place between Montgomery and Pitney. The session included The Nashville A-Team of musicians.

The song was issued as the duo's first single together in November 1965 via Musicor Records. The single peaked at number fifteen on the Billboard Hot Country Singles chart in early 1966. It was the pair's first and only major hit duet recording together and was issued on the studio album Being Together (1966).

== Charts ==
Chart (1965–1966)	Peak position
U.S. Billboard Hot Country Singles	15
