= Barbra Amesbury =

Canadian philanthropist, singer-songwriter, composer, and filmmaker

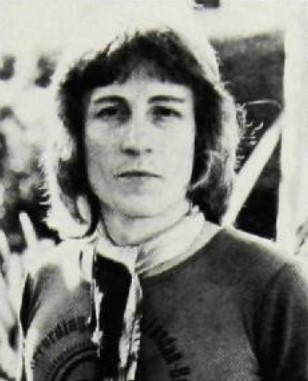

Background information
- Born: 1948 (age 77–78); Kirkland Lake, Ontario, Canada
- Occupations: Philanthropist, singer-songwriter, composer, filmmaker
- Years active: 1970s–present

Barbra Amesbury (born 1948) is a Canadian philanthropist, singer-songwriter, composer and filmmaker, who had several Top 40 hits in Canada in the 1970s. Amesbury was the long-time partner of Canadian philanthropist Joan Chalmers until her death in 2016.

Known as Bill Amesbury during her active musical career, Amesbury came out as transgender after leaving the music business.

== Music ==
Amesbury's biggest hit was "Virginia (Touch Me Like You Do)", which was also the first single (1974) to be released on the Casablanca Records label, reaching #14 in Canada. Written by Amesbury, the song also reached No. 59 on the U.S. Billboard Hot 100 chart and #8 on Toronto's CHUM Chart. "Rock My Roll" reached #94 in Canada later in 1974.

"Can You Feel It" was also a minor hit in 1976. The title album reached #57 in Canada. Amesbury's "Nothin' But a Fool" has been covered by Natalie Cole, and "A Thrill's a Thrill" was recorded in 1979 by Long John Baldry and covered by Mitch Ryder with Marianne Faithfull and John Cougar.

In 1976 and 1977, Amesbury produced "No Charge" by J.J. Barrie, which became a number one hit in England. In 1999, "Virginia" was given an award by SOCAN to mark 100,000 spins on Canadian radio stations.

In 2002, James Collins and Dave Pickell released the single "Do You Mind If We Talk About Bill?", which was written about Amesbury.

== Filmmaking and art ==
In 1994, Amesbury and her partner Joan Chalmers organized an art exhibition called Survivors, In Search of a Voice: The Art of Courage, using the stories of breast cancer survivors to inspire 24 women artists to create works of art aimed at raising awareness of breast cancer. The exhibition toured throughout North America from 1995 to 1998, accompanied by a companion book. Amesbury also shot a documentary film of the tour.

In 2006 and 2007, her documentary film The G8 is Coming...The G8 is Coming was an official selection of the Rome International Film Festival, the Ashville Film Festival, the Atlanta Film Festival, the Southern Winds Film Festival, and the Dixie Film Festival.

Amesbury and Chalmers have provided support and donations to a variety of charities and organizations through their Woodlawn Arts Foundation.

== Discography ==
=== Albums ===
Title	Date	Record Label	Cat. No.	Format
Jus' a Taste of the Kid	10 July 1974	Casablanca	NB 9005	LP, 8T
Can You Feel It	March 1976	Capitol Records	ST 11528	LP, CC

=== Singles ===
Date	A-Side	B-Side	Record Label	Cat. No.	Album
1972	She's In Love And She Couldn't Give A Damn For You Now	Here I Go Again	Yorksville	YVM-45054	Non-album Single
Jan 1974	Virginia (Touch Me Like You Do	That Close To Me	Casablanca	NEB 0001	Jus' A Taste Of The Kid
Aug 1974	Rock My Roll	She's In Love	Casablanca	NES 0101	Jus' A Taste Of The Kid
Jan 1975	Frogman Bradley	She's In Love	Casablanca	NB 813	Jus' A Taste Of The Kid
May 1975	Every Girl In The World, Tonight	Sailin	Casablanca	NB 832	A: Can You Feel It; B: Jus' A Taste Of The Kid
Nov 1975	Every Girl In The World Tonight	Lucky Day	Power Exchange	PX 115	Can You Feel It
Apr 1976	Saturday Night (I'll Be Waiting)	Jessi	Power Exchange	PX 204	Can You Feel It
May 1976	Sugar Pie	I Remember	Power Exchange	PX 218	Can You Feel It
Jul 1976	I Remember	Lucky Day	Capitol	4287	Can You Feel It
Nov 1976	Can You Feel It	Jessi	Capitol	72779	Can You Feel It
Apr 1977	You Belong to Me	Harlow	Capitol	72785	Non-album Single

=== Production and Songwriting ===
Year	Song Title	Artist Name	Album Title	Role
1976	"Granpa (Tell Me One More Story)"	Kristine Sparkle	I'm A Song	Producer
1976	"No Charge"	J. J. Barrie	The Autumn Of My Life	Producer
1978	"Every Girl In The World Tonight"	Hush	The Singles Album	Composer
1979	"A Thrill's a Thrill"	Long John Baldry	Baldry's Out	Composer
1981	"Nothin' But a Fool"	Natalie Cole	Happy Love	Composer
1983	"This Boy"	Linda Lewis	A Tear And A Smile	Composer
