= No Charge =

1974 single by Melba Montgomery

Single by Melba Montgomery

from the album No Charge
- B-side: "I Love Him Because He's That Way"
- Released: February 1974
- Recorded: January 1974
- Genre: Country, Pop
- Length: 3:25
- Label: Elektra 45883
- Songwriter: Harlan Howard
- Producer: Pete Drake

Melba Montgomery singles chronology
"He'll Come Home" (1974)	"No Charge" (1974)	"Your Pretty Roses Come Too Late" (1974)

Official audio
- "No Charge" on YouTube

"No Charge" is a country music song, written by songwriter Harlan Howard. It was first recorded by country singer Melba Montgomery, whose 1974 version was a No. 1 country hit in both the U.S. and Canada, as well as making No. 39 on the U.S. pop charts. In the UK, the song is associated with J. J. Barrie, whose 1976 version was a No. 1 UK hit. In Canada, newscaster John Gilbert also charted with his version in 1976.

== About the song ==
Melba Montgomery had already recorded a series of duets hits with country music artists George Jones, Charlie Louvin, and Gene Pitney during the 1960s (the most successful of those being "We Must Have Been Out of Our Minds" with Jones). In the early 1970s, she began focusing on a solo career, but did not have notable success.

Eventually, she began recording for Elektra Records, where her struggles continued. Then, Howard forwarded a song to Montgomery he thought would be perfect for her: "No Charge." She recorded "No Charge" in early 1974, and it was released that February. By the end of May, Montgomery enjoyed her first taste of solo success, reaching No. 1 on the Billboard's Hot Country Singles chart. The song also reached No. 39 on the Billboard Hot 100.

Commenting on the record to Tom Roland in The Billboard Book of Number One Country Hits, Harlan Howard said, "I've never written a song that moves people so much. I've had guys tell me they almost wrecked their truck when they heard it 'cause it made them cry. I had a lot of delightful records in many different languages on that song, but I guess that's probably my favorite song as far as impact is concerned."

When playing the J. J. Barrie version on Capital Radio's Top 40 programme, London DJ Roger Scott introduced the song as a "comedy record", and feigned uncontrollable laughter at the end, picking up on the lines "For advice and the knowledge / and the cost of your college".

=== Synopsis ===
A young boy hands his mother an itemized list of charges he says he's owed for performing various chores and comes to collect; the singer performs this in spoken word. The mother responds (singing) by reminding her son about all the things she's done for him, that she never asked him to pay for services rendered and that, all things considered, "the cost of real love is no charge."

Enlightened, the young boy realizes that his mother is right and changes the amount due to "paid in full" (once again, narrated) before the singer sings the moral.

== Chart performance ==
=== Weekly charts ===
Melba Montgomery

Chart (1974)	Peak position
U.S. Billboard Hot Country Singles	1
U.S. Billboard Hot 100	39
Canadian RPM Country Tracks	1
Canadian RPM Top Singles	47
Canadian RPM Adult Contemporary Tracks	24

Shirley Caesar

Chart (1975)	Peak position
U.S. Billboard Hot 100	91
U.S. Cash Box Top 100	97

J. J. Barrie

Chart (1976)	Peak position
Australia (Kent Music Report)	29
Canada RPM Pop Music Playlist	39
Ireland (IRMA)	13
New Zealand (Listener)	16
South Africa (Springbok)	2
UK	1

=== Year-end charts ===
Chart (1976)	Rank
UK	30

John Gilbert

Chart (1976)	Peak position
Canada RPM Top Singles	55

== Cover versions ==
The song has been recorded by numerous other artists since its release by Montgomery. The most successful version was recorded by J.J. Barrie, who took the Bill Amesbury produced song to No. 1 on the UK Singles Chart in June 1976, where it remained for one week.

In Canada, broadcaster John Gilbert charted nationally with his version, though the song is often associated with Tommy Hunter who performed the song on the CBC Television show.

Fellow country singers Johnny Cash and Tammy Wynette recorded versions of the song in the 1970s. It has also been a popular Christian song through the years, most famously performed by Shirley Caesar, who added to the moral by recalling Jesus' sacrifice for humanity.

Billy Connolly recorded a parody of the song in 1976 called "No Chance (No Charge)", which had a reference to domestic violence. It reached Number 24 on the UK Singles Chart. One critic commented that "No Charge" was more surreal than anything a mere parodist could come up with.

C. C. (Chris) Sandford recorded a comedy version in 1976 entitled: No Charge (Chuck) (UK: Power Exchange Records PX 223)
