= A House of Gold =

Single by Hank Williams
- A-side: "How Can You Refuse Him Now?"
- Released: 1954
- Recorded: 1948 or 1949, Shreveport
- Genre: Country
- Length: 2:15
- Label: MGM Records
- Songwriter: Hank Williams

"House of Gold" is a hymn written by Hank Williams. It was released by MGM Records as the B-side to "How Can You Refuse Him Now?" in 1954. It was recorded as a demo when Williams worked the Louisiana Hayride in Shreveport between August 1948 and May 1949. The song admonishes those who "steal, cheat, and lie" in pursuit of material wealth rather than finding salvation in God. Despite being a posthumous single that he never recorded with his band in a studio, "A House of Gold" became one of Hank's most covered hymns.

== Cover versions ==
- The Jordanaires also covered the song in 1956.
- George Hamilton IV cut the song in 1958 for ABC.
- Floyd Cramer recorded an instrumental version for RCA in 1962.
- George Jones recorded the song as a duet with Melba Montgomery in 1964 for United Artists.
- Porter Wagoner cut it in 1966.
- Hank Williams, Jr. cut the song for MGM in 1969.
- The Seldom Scene covered the song on their album Act Two in 1973.
- Kenny Rankin covered the song in 1970 and again in 1976.
- Connie Smith recorded the song on Columbia in 1975.
- Moe Bandy covered the song in 1983.
- Mike Ness covered the song on the album "Under The Influences" in 1999.
- Dierks Bentley covered the song in 2008.
- Willie Nelson included a version on his 2010 album Country Music.
- The Secret Sisters on their debut album.
