= Singing What's in Our Heart =

Studio album by George Jones
- Released: November 1963
- Recorded: March and August 1963
- Studio: Columbia (Nashville, Tennessee)
- Genre: Country
- Length: 30:09
- Label: United Artists Records
- Producer: Pappy Daily

George Jones chronology
I Wish Tonight Would Never End (1963)	Singing What's in Our Heart (1963)	A King & Two Queens (1964)

Professional ratings
Review scores
Source	Rating
Allmusic	2/5 stars

Singing What's in Our Heart is an album by American country music artists George Jones and Melba Montgomery released in November 1963 on United Artists Records.

== Reception ==
AllMusic's Stephen Thomas Erlewine writes, "Many (including the man himself) rank these as Jones' best duets ever, putting them above his work with Tammy Wynette collaborations, when in truth they're kind of hard to compare - not only are they different from the lush, dramatic work with Tammy, they're quite a bit different than any other country he ever did, occasionally veering into the pile-driving intensity of bluegrass."

== Track listing ==
No.	Title	Writer(s)	Length
1.	"Let's Invite Them Over"	Onie Wheeler	2:08
2.	"We Must Have Been Out of Our Minds"	Melba Montgomery	2:36
3.	"Suppose Tonight Would Be Our Last"	George Jones, Montgomery	2:33
4.	"I Let You Go"	Montgomery	2:34
5.	"Multiply the Heartaches"	Fred Rose	2:21
6.	"She's My Mother"	Charlie Louvin, Ira Louvin	2:38
7.	"What's in Our Heart"	Jones, Johnny "Country" Mathis	2:36
8.	"Until Then"	Montgomery, Carl Montgomery	2:33
9.	"Don't Go"	Onie Wheeler	2:19
10.	"Now Tell Me"	Pete Hunter	2:40
11.	"There's a Friend in the Way"	Onie Wheeler	2:05
12.	"Flame in My Heart"	Jones, Bernard Spurlock	2:27

== Charts ==
Chart (1963)	Peak position
US Top Country Albums (Billboard)	3

== Charting Singles ==
Single	Chart	Peak position
We Must Have Been Out Of Our Minds	U.S. Billboard Hot Country Singles	3
Let's Invite Them Over	U.S. Billboard Hot Country Singles	17
Multiply the Heartaches	U.S. Billboard Hot Country Singles	25
What's in Our Heart	U.S. Billboard Hot Country Singles	20
