= Melba Montgomery =

American country music singer-songwriter (1938–2025)

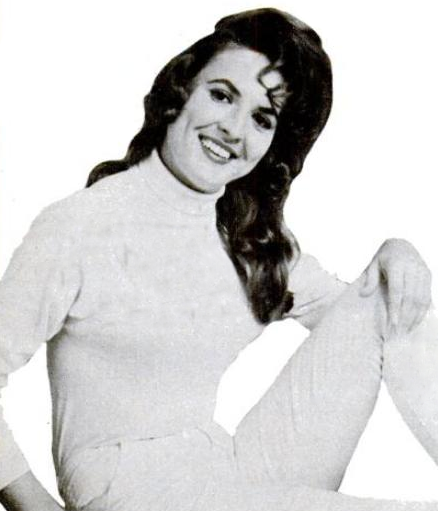
- Born: Melba Joyce Montgomery; October 14, 1938; Iron City, Tennessee, U.S.
- Died: January 15, 2025 (aged 86); Nashville, Tennessee, U.S.
- Resting place: Harpeth Hills Memory Gardens; Nashville, Tennessee, U.S.
- Occupations: Singer; songwriter
- Years active: 1958–2015
- Known for: "No Charge"
- Spouse: Jack Solomon (m. 1968; died 2014)
- Musical career
- Genres: Country
- Instruments: Vocals; guitar
- Labels: Nugget; United Artists; Musicor; Capitol; Elektra; Phanorama; Audiograph; GBS; Playback

Melba Joyce Montgomery (October 14, 1938 – January 15, 2025) was an American country music singer and songwriter. She was known for a series of duet recordings made with George Jones, Gene Pitney, and Charlie Louvin. She was also a solo artist, having reached the top of the country charts in 1974 with the song, "No Charge". Born in Tennessee but raised in Alabama, Montgomery had a musical upbringing. Along with her two brothers (songwriters Carl and Earl Montgomery), she placed in a talent contest which brought her to the attention of Roy Acuff. For several years, she toured the country as part of his band until she signed with United Artists Records in 1963.

At United Artists, Montgomery collaborated with George Jones on a series of duets. Their first was 1963's "We Must Have Been Out of Our Minds", which became a top-five single on the country charts. For several years, Jones and Montgomery toured and recorded together. Among their other singles was "What's in Our Heart", "Let's Invite Them Over", and "Party Pickin'". Montgomery became more identified as a duet artist as the decade progressed. She recorded with both Gene Pitney and Charlie Louvin on several charting country singles. Her solo career was overshadowed, though, until she moved to Elektra Records in 1973. Her 1974 song about motherhood called "No Charge" became a commercial success in several genres. It was followed by a series of charting singles, including the top 20 "Don't Let the Good Times Fool You" (1975).

Montgomery continued her solo career. In 1977, she reached the top 40 of the country charts again with a cover of the song, "Angel of the Morning". In the '80s, she released several recordings, including the album I Still Care and the charting single "Straight Talkin'". In the '90s, Montgomery began working as a songwriter in the country music community. She wrote songs that were recorded by a series of artists. Among them was George Strait, who recorded "What Do You Say to That", which became a top-five country single. Montgomery has also continued sporadically releasing music as a country artist. Her final album was 2010's Things That Keep You Going, issued on RPM Music.

== Early life ==
Melba Joyce Montgomery was born into a musical family in Iron City, Tennessee, United States, on October 14, 1938. Siblings, Carl and Earl Montgomery, later became songwriters in the country music field. She was raised in Florence, Alabama, where her father taught vocal lessons in the local Methodist church. Montgomery first began singing in the Methodist church and was later given a guitar at age 10. Montgomery and her two brothers formed a trio in their late teens. When she was age 20, the sibling trio won an amateur talent contest held at Nashville radio station WSM's Studio C, which at that time housed the Grand Ole Opry. Impressed by her singing, the talent content judge, Roy Acuff, invited Montgomery to tour with him in place of singer June Webb. Montgomery toured with Acuff from 1958 until 1962. She also recorded three singles for the Nugget label in 1962.

== Career ==
=== 1963–1972: Breakthrough with George Jones and career as a duet artist ===
In 1963, Montgomery signed her first major-label recording contract with United Artists Records. Her music was discovered by George Jones (who was also on United Artists) who persuaded producer Pappy Daily to sign her to the label. The pair began recording as a duet partnership beginning in 1963. Montgomery wrote their first duet single called "We Must Have Been Out of Our Minds". In 1963, the single climbed to number three on the American Billboard Hot Country Songs chart. The song became Montgomery's breakout single. It was followed by the double-sided top-20 Billboard single, "Let's Invite Them Over"/"What's in Our Heart" and "You Comb Her Hair". The recordings were included on Jones and Montgomery's first studio album, also titled What's in Our Hearts. The disc reached number three on the Billboard Country Albums list in 1963. Their second studio disc, Bluegrass Hootenanny (1964), reached number 12 on the country albums survey. The other singles by the pair that made the Billboard country top 40 through 1967 are: "Please Be My New Love", "Multiply the Heartaches". and "Party Pickin'".

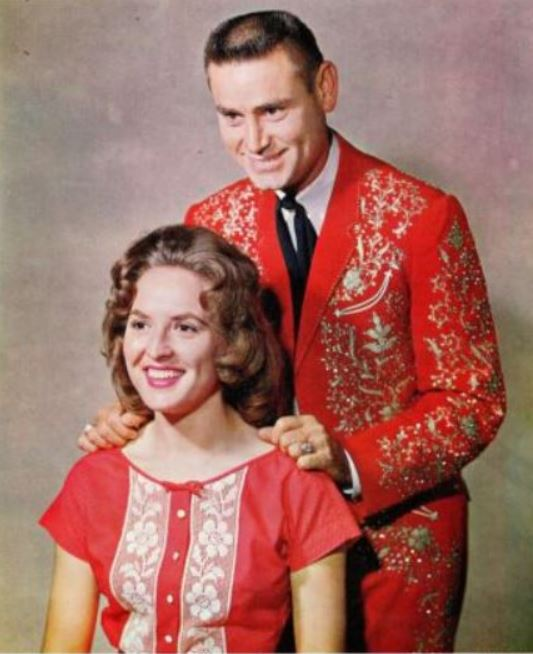
Montgomery first became a commercial success as George Jones's duet partner. In the 1960s, they recorded a series of duets such as "We Must Have Been Out of Our Minds".

Between 1963 and 1968, Jones and Montgomery recorded a series of duet singles and albums. Their songs centered on themes about couples committing infidelity or comedic-themed songs about marital conflicts. The songs were then blended with Montgomery's Appalachian vocal harmonies. Critics and writers took notice of the Jones-Montgomery duets. In reviewing a 1996 compilation, Stephen Thomas Erlewine of AllMusic found their songs to "illustrate how well-suited the pair was for each other" and that Montgomery was perhaps "Jones' best duet partner." Wade Jessen of Billboard described the blending of their voices to have "electrifying intensity". The duo toured together routinely throughout the 1960s as well. "It was such an honor to get to record and work shows with him. I’ve been very very blessed through my career," Montgomery recalled.

Montgomery also had a solo career during this period. Her 1963 solo singles, "Hall of Shame" and "The Greatest One of All", both made the top 30 on the Billboard country songs chart. Her solo recordings of this era were also produced by Pappy Daily. Her debut studio album was released in 1964 by United Artists called America's Number One Country and Western Girl Singer. It was followed in August 1964 by her second solo album, Down Home. Along with George Jones, Montgomery moved to Musicor Records in 1966. The same year, Montgomery collaborated with Gene Pitney on the single, "Baby Ain't That Fine". The song rose to number 15 on the Billboard country songs chart in 1966. A collaborative album between the pair was also released in 1966 titled Being Together.

Along with her collaborative recordings, Musicor continued releasing solo albums by Montgomery. In 1966, the label issued her first album of sacred music titled Hallelujah Road. Her other solo albums such as Don't Keep Me Lonely Too Long (1966) contained traditional country material. However, none of her solo singles was commercially successful. Only 1967's "What Can I Tell the Folks Back Home" made the Billboard country chart, peaking at number 61. At Capitol Records, she began being produced by Pete Drake. He was successful in pairing her as a duet partnership with Charlie Louvin. Their 1970 single, "Something to Brag About", went to number 18 on the country songs chart. It was followed by their 1971 studio LP of the same name, which made it to number 45 on the Billboard country albums chart. Five more of their duet singles made the country chart through 1972, including the top-40 entries "Did You Ever" and "Baby (You've Got What It Takes)".

=== 1973–1992: "No Charge" and solo career focus ===
Montgomery had yet to achieve commercial success as a solo artist, despite having solo material previously released. In 1973, producer Pete Drake helped her sign with the newly formed country division of Elektra Records. The label promised that Montgomery's music would receive promotion in the country field. Her first Elektra release was 1973's "Wrap Your Love Around Me". Co-written by Montgomery, it became her third solo top-40 entry on the Billboard Hot Country Songs chart and her first to reach Canada's RPM country chart. It was followed later in October 1973 by her eponymous album. Billboard magazine named it among its "Top Album Picks" following its release. A second single spawned from the album in early 1974 failed to reach the top 40 in the United States and Canada.

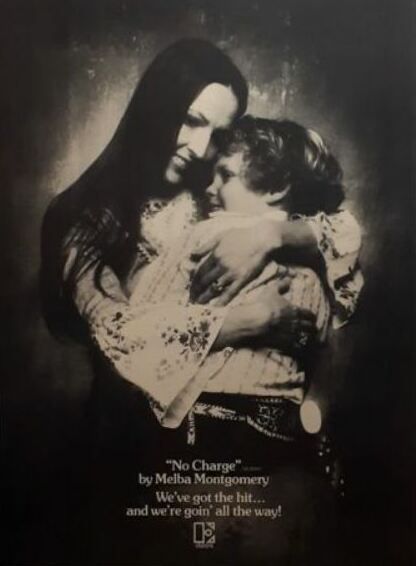
A trade advertisement for Montgomery's 1974 signature recording, "No Charge".

In 1974, songwriter Harlan Howard brought Montgomery a song he had reportedly written especially for her called "No Charge". The song was written from the point of view of a mother who tells her child how she has cared for him without ever being paid for her domestic responsibilities. Her performance on the song's recording reportedly made studio musicians weep while they were playing it. The single topped the Billboard and RPM country charts around Mother's Day in May 1974. It became her first (and only) number-one song in her career. It also climbed into the top 40 of the Billboard Hot 100 and the RPM Top Singles chart. Elektra issued Montgomery's studio album of the same name in April 1974, which reached number 14 on the Top Country Albums survey. The song's commercial success elevated her solo career. She appeared on both The Mike Douglas Show and The Midnight Special in 1974. She also played several venues that attracted pop audiences. "I'm delighted 'No Charge' hit the pop charts, but we cut it as country," Montgomery reflected in 1974.

Montgomery continued releasing material with Elektra Records through the mid-'70s. The follow-up singles, "Your Pretty Roses Came Too Late" and "If You Want the Rainbow", both failed to reach the country top 40 in 1974. Then, the up-tempo "Don't Let the Good Times Fool You" reached the top 15 of the country charts in 1975. A studio album of the same name appeared in April 1975 that reached number 47 on the Top Country Albums survey. Elektra issued a final studio album under their label in November 1975 titled The Greatest Gift of All, which failed to chart. Montgomery returned to United Artists Records in 1976 and began working under the production of Larry Butler. Two of her United Artists singles made the country charts. The highest-charting was a cover of Merrilee Rush's "Angel of the Morning", which made it to number 22 on the Billboard country chart. A more successful version was recorded by Juice Newton in the 1980s. In April 1978, United Artists issued Montgomery's second eponymous LP featuring "Angel of the Morning".

Montgomery went into a period of semiretirement following her recordings with United Artists. She focused on her family and domestic responsibilities. She eventually returned to her recording career, in which she focused mostly on touring and performing. In 1980, she returned on the Kari label with "The Star", a single that made a brief appearance on the Billboard country chart. In 1982, the Phonarama label released a studio album by Montgomery titled I Still Care. The collection consisted of country music cover tunes. A studio album of new recordings appeared on Compass Records in 1986, which was also titled No Charge. The label also issued Montgomery's last charting single to date titled "Straight Talkin'". In 1992, Montgomery's next studio album was released on the Playback label titled Do You Know Where Your Man Is. One year later, Pam Tillis had a top-20 Billboard single with the album's title track. AllMusic's Greg Adams gave the album a two-star rating and commented, "She sounds great and the material is fine, but 'Do You Know Where Your Man Is' isn't up to the standards of the music she made in her prime."

=== 1993–2015: Focus on songwriting and independent album releases ===
Beginning in the '90s, Montgomery started working more heavily in the field of country music songwriting. A new group of artists began recording her compositions, many of which were co-written with Carl Jackson. One of them was Terri Clark, who recorded "Cure for the Common Heartache" for her 1998 album, How I Feel. She also co-wrote several songs with Kostas. Among them was "You Beat All I've Ever Seen", recorded on Rhonda Vincent's 1996 album, Trouble Free. Montgomery has also co-wrote songs with other recording artists, such as Sara Evans. Their song, "If You Ever Want My Lovin'", was included on Evans's debut album, Three Chords and the Truth. In 1999, George Strait had a top-five single with "What Do You Say to That". Along with its co-writer, Jim Lauderdale, she was nominated for "Country Songwriter of the Year" by the BMI. She also co-wrote the single, "Out of Control Raging Fire", which was recorded in 2001 by Patty Loveless and Travis Tritt.

Montgomery also continued to record her own material. In 1997, a Swedish label released her next studio album titled This Time Around. The album's 10 tracks were written or co-written entirely by Montgomery. Other songwriters credited on the disc included Kostas, Jerry Salley, and her husband, Jack Solomon. In 1999, she joined John Prine on his studio album In Spite of Ourselves, on which she recorded two songs. One of them was remake of "We Must Have Been Out of Our Minds". Her last studio album was 2010's Things That Keep You Going, which was issued on RPM Music. She continued to perform until 2015.

== Artistry ==
Montgomery's musical style is rooted in traditional country music. She has also embedded elements of Appalachian and bluegrass into her musical style. Montgomery's characteristic vocal delivery was often compared to her duet partner, George Jones, which led to her being nicknamed "the female George Jones". The pair's duet recordings were remarked as being influential on a generation of partnerships that followed in the country genre. Although Montgomery had a solo career, she is best remembered for her duets. "I guess I just couldn't get away from the duets. I believe, to a certain extent, that duets did overshadow my work as a solo artist," she recounted in 2003.

== Personal life and death ==
Montgomery wed musician Jack Solomon in 1968. Solomon first performed in George Jones's touring band called the Jones Boys and later became a session musician in Nashville. In 2014, Solomon died at the age of 71. In her final years, Montgomery battled dementia and died at a Nashville care facility on January 15, 2025, at the age of 86. Her funeral service was held at Harpeth Hills Funeral Home on January 22, 2025. She was buried in its cemetery afterwards.

== Discography ==
Solo studio albums

- America's Number One Country and Western Girl Singer (1964)
- Down Home (1964)
- I Can't Get Used to Being Lonely (1965)
- Hallelujah Road (1966)
- Country Girl (1966)
- Melba Toast (1967)
- Don't Keep Me Lonely Too Long (1967)
- I'm Just Living (1967)
- The Big Beautiful Country World of Melba Montgomery (1969)
- Don't Keep Me Lonely Too Long (1970)
- Melba Montgomery (1973)
- No Charge (1974)
- Don't Let the Good Times Fool You (1975)
- The Greatest Gift of All (1975)
- Melba Montgomery (1978)
- I Still Care (1982)
- Audiograph Alive (1983)
- No Charge (1986)
- Do You Know Where Your Man Is (1992)
- This Time Around (1997)
- Studio 102 Essentials (2008)
- Things That Keep You Going (2010)

Collaborative studio albums

- What's in Our Heart (with George Jones) (1963)
- Bluegrass Hootenanny (with George Jones) (1964)
- Being Together (with Gene Pitney) (1965)
- Party Pickin' (with George Jones) (1967)
- Close Together (As You and Me) (with George Jones) (1966)
- Something to Brag About (with Charlie Louvin) (1971)
- Baby You've Got What It Takes (with Charlie Louvin) (1971)

== Awards and nominations ==
Year	Nominee / work	Award	Result	Ref.
1963	Billboard Country Awards	Most Promising Female Country Artist	Won	
1963	Cash Box	Most Promising New C&W Female Vocalist	Won	
1964	Record World	Fastest Climbing Female Vocalist	Nominated	
1965	Billboard Country Awards	Most Promising Singing Group (with George Jones)	Nominated	
1971	Country Music Association Awards	Vocal Group of the Year (with Charlie Louvin)	Nominated	
1974	Nashville's Walkway of the Stars	Inducted	Won	
2000	BMI Film & TV Awards	Country Songwriter of the Year (with Jim Lauderdale)	Nominated	
2002	International Bluegrass Music Awards	Collaborative Recording of the Year (with various artists)	Won	
