= Pete Drake =

American record producer and pedal steel guitarist (1932–1988)

- Born: Roddis Franklin Drake; October 8, 1932; Augusta, Georgia U.S.
- Died: July 29, 1988 (aged 55) Nashville, Tennessee, U.S.
- Genres: Country; rock
- Occupations: Guitarist, songwriter, actor, producer
- Instrument: Pedal steel guitar
- Labels: Smash, First Generation Records
- Website: PeteDrake.net

Roddis Franklin "Pete" Drake (October 8, 1932 – July 29, 1988) was a Nashville-based American record producer and pedal steel guitar player. One of the most sought-after backup musicians of the 1960s, Drake played on such hits as Lynn Anderson's "Rose Garden", Charlie Rich's "Behind Closed Doors", Bob Dylan's "Lay Lady Lay", and Tammy Wynette's "Stand by Your Man". Drake was inducted into the Musicians Hall of Fame and Museum in 2007, and the Country Music Hall of Fame in 2022.

== Career ==
Drake was born in Augusta, Georgia, the son of a Pentecostal preacher. In 1950, he drove to Nashville, heard Jerry Byrd on the Grand Ole Opry, and was inspired to buy a steel guitar. Later in the 1950s, in Atlanta, Georgia, he organized the country music band Sons of the South, which included future country stars like Jerry Reed, Doug Kershaw, Roger Miller, Jack Greene, and Joe South.

In 1959, he moved to Nashville, joined the Nashville A-Team, and went on the road as a backup musician for Don Gibson, Marty Robbins, and others. In 1964 he had an international hit on Smash Records with his "talking steel guitar" playing on Bill Anderson's 1963 album Still.

The single "Forever" charted in March 1964 and reached No. 25 in the Billboard Hot 100, eventually sold over one million copies, and was awarded a gold disc. The subsequent album with the same name reached No. 85 in the US. His innovative use of what would be called the talk box, later used by Peter Frampton, Joe Walsh, Roger Troutman and Jeff Beck, added novel effects to the pedal steel guitar. The album Pete Drake and His Talking Steel Guitar harkened back to the sounds of Alvino Rey and his wife Luise King, who first modulated a guitar tone with the signal from a throat microphone in 1939. The unique sound of the talk box with a steel guitar was new in the 1960s, and it made the sounds of vocalizing along with the strings of the steel guitar. According to an interview of Drake:

You play the notes on the guitar and it goes through the amplifier. I have a driver system so that you disconnect the speakers and the sound goes through the driver into a plastic tube. You put the tube in the side of your mouth then form the words with your mouth as you play them. You don't actually say a word: The guitar is your vocal cords, and your mouth is the amplifier. It's amplified by a microphone.

The equipment was only loud enough to be useful in the studio for recordings.

Drake played on Bob Dylan's three albums recorded in Nashville, including Nashville Skyline, and on Joan Baez's David's Album. He also worked with George Harrison on All Things Must Pass, and produced Ringo Starr on Beaucoups of Blues in 1970.

Drake produced albums for many other musicians, and founded Stop Records and First Generation Records, Countryrecords.com. Recording country legends, Ernest Tubb, Jean Shepard, Jan Howard, Justin Tubb, Billy Walker, Ray Pillow, Ferlin Husky, Stonewall Jackson, The Wilburn Brothers, Lonzo & Oscar, Cal Smith, Charlie Louvin, Vic Willis Trio, George Hamilton IV.

He was inducted into the Country Music Hall of Fame's Walkway of Stars in 1970 and the Steel Guitar Hall of Fame in 1987 and into the Georgia Music Hall of Fame in 2010. Inducted into the Musicians Hall of Fame May 7, 1987 as a member of the "A" team Nashville Session players. On May 1, 2022, Drake was one of four inductees into the Country Music Hall of Fame for the year 2021 along with Ray Charles, The Judds, and Eddie Bayers.

== Death ==
Developing emphysema and congestive heart failure after four decades of smoking, Drake's health began declining in 1985. He sold Pete's Place recording studio at 809 18th Avenue South to Mel Tillis in 1985, then built Pete's Place studio in Berry Hill (currently County Q studios) and the last recording studio he built was in the Drake's own home in Brentwood, Tennessee. He died on July 29, 1988, at the age of 55. He is buried in Spring Hill Cemetery in Nashville.
