= We Must Have Been Out of Our Minds =

"We Must Have Been Out Of Our Minds"

Single by George Jones and Melba Montgomery
- Released: March 1963 (U.S.)
- Recorded: 1962
- Studio: Columbia (Nashville, Tennessee)
- Genre: Country
- Length: 2:38
- Label: United Artists 575
- Songwriter(s): Melba Montgomery

George Jones singles chronology
"I Saw Me" (1963)	"'We Must Have Been Out of Our Minds'" (1963)	"You Comb Her Hair" (1963)

Melba Montgomery singles chronology
"'We Must Have Been Out of Our Minds'" (1963)	"Hall of Shame" (1963)

"We Must Have Been Out Of Our Minds" is a song made famous as a duet by country music singers George Jones and Melba Montgomery. Originally released in March 1963, the song became a Top 5 hit on the Billboard Hot Country Singles chart and a country music standard. It was also issued on Jones' April 1963 album, I Wish Tonight Would Never End and on their November 1963 duet album Singing What's in Our Heart.

== Background ==
Duets, featuring the voices of two top stars that usually perform as solo acts, have been a staple of country music since its beginnings, the pairings meeting with varying levels of success. The song "We Must Have Been Out Of Our Minds" paired, in the opinion of genre historian Bill Malone, "two top-flight, hard country singers." It also was "made distinctive by the interplay between the dobro and pedal steel guitar," and became "a modern classic of honky tonk music," continued Malone. In his autobiography I Lived To Tell It All, Jones remained quite proud of the work he did with Montgomery: "I had giant records years later with Tammy Wynette, and there were many other successful duet partners, such as Porter Wagoner and Dolly Parton and Conway Twitty and Loretta Lynn. I'm not saying Melba and I were the first to sing male-female duets in country music because we weren't. And I'm not saying we were the best. But Melba said recently that she thinks we popularized the male-female format, and I agree."

"We Must Have Been Out of Our Minds" was Montgomery's first national hit, and the most successful recording from the Jones-Montgomery duet pairing. The song reached No. 3 on the Billboard Hot Country Singles chart in July 1963, and spent 23 weeks in the chart's top 40, one of the longer runs of any country single released during the 1960s. Montgomery later remembered: "I was nervous as a cat! Not only was it my first major session, but it was with George Jones! George had been out roarin' the night before, and nobody even knew where he was until an hour before the session. When he finally showed up, he was in a really good mood, and the whole thing came off really well."

Jones - already a successful performer in country music with three No. 1 songs and 13 additional Top 10 hits in his nearly three dozen singles charted on the Billboard Hot Country Singles chart - went on to enjoy greater success during the next 40-plus years. Jones' career included several duet pairings, the most successful being with Tammy Wynette (to whom he was married from 1969 to 1975). Montgomery would continue charting through the late 1970s, including several duets with Jones, Gene Pitney and Charlie Louvin. However, just one song — 1974's "No Charge," an ode to motherhood — would be a major success; that song reached No. 1 on the Billboard Hot Country Singles chart that May.

== Cover versions ==
- Bobby Bare and Skeeter Davis cut the song for their duet album Tunes for Two.
- Hank Williams, Jr. and Lois Johnson recorded the song for MGM in 1971.
- Kris Kristofferson and Rita Coolidge recorded the song for their 1974 album Breakaway.
- Leona Williams and Justin Travi cut a version of the song.
- George Jones performed the song with Connie Smith during a television appearance in 1988 and again on his own TNN show with Loretta Lynn.
- Montgomery recorded the song again with John Prine in 1999.

== Chart performance ==
Chart (1963)	Peak position
U.S. Billboard Hot Country Singles	3

== Sources ==
- Whitburn, Joel, "Top Country Songs: 1944-2005," 2006.
