= Loretta Lynn singles discography =

Single discography of American singer-songwriter Loretta Lynn

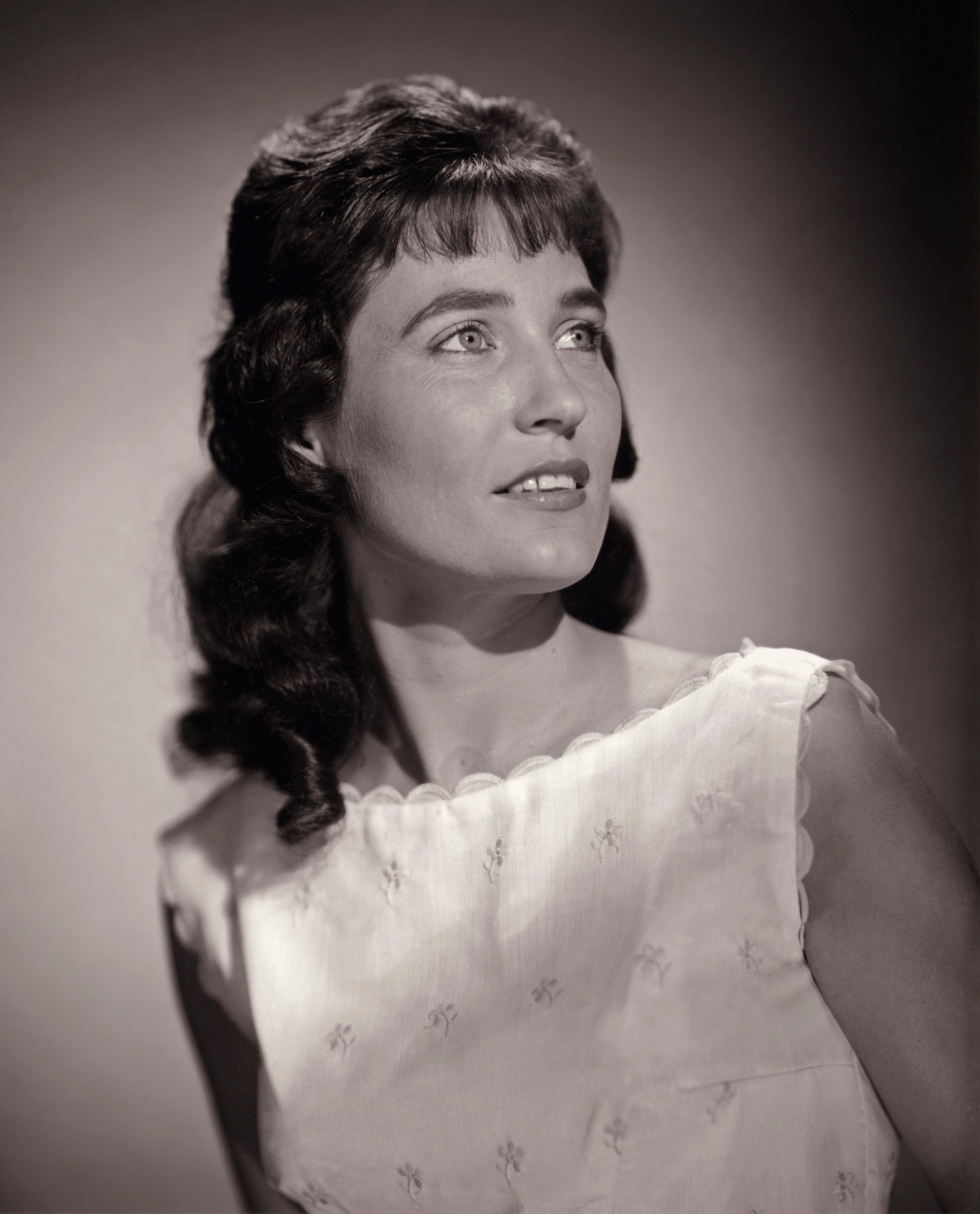
- Lynn in a 1962 publicity portrait
- Singles: 86
- B-sides: 2
- Music videos: 14

American country artist Loretta Lynn released 86 singles, two B-sides and 14 music videos. Her debut single was "I'm a Honky Tonk Girl" (1960) via Zero Records. Promoting the song with her husband by driving to each radio station, the effort paid off when it peaked at #14 on the Billboard Hot Country Songs chart. Arriving in Nashville, Tennessee, that year, she signed a recording contract with Decca Records. In 1962, "Success" reached the sixth position on the country songs chart, starting a series of top ten hits including "Wine Women and Song" and "Blue Kentucky Girl". She began collaborating with Ernest Tubb in 1964 and recorded four hit singles with him, including "Mr. and Mrs. Used to Be". Lynn's popularity greatly increased in 1966 when she began releasing her own compositions as singles. Among the first was "You Ain't Woman Enough (To Take My Man)" which reached the second position on the country songs list. She then reached the number one spot with "Don't Come Home A-Drinkin' (With Lovin' on Your Mind)" (1967). This was followed by "Fist City" (1968) and "Woman of the World (Leave My World Alone)" (1969).

Lynn released the autobiographical single "Coal Miner's Daughter" in 1970, topping the Billboard country songs survey and becoming her first entry on the Billboard Hot 100, peaking at number eighty-three. The following year, "I Wanna Be Free" also charted among the Hot 100 and reached the third position on the Hot Country Songs list. The same year, "One's on the Way" became Lynn's fifth number one single, later followed by "Rated "X"" (1972), "Love Is the Foundation" (1973), and "Trouble in Paradise" (1974). "The Pill" (1975) reached number five on the country songs chart and was her highest-charting solo single on the Billboard Hot 100, reaching number seventy. "Somebody Somewhere (Don't Know What He's Missin' Tonight)" reached the top of the country songs chart in 1976 and she reached the same position with "She's Got You" (1977), a cover of Patsy Cline's original single. The title track from Out of My Head and Back in My Bed (1978) was Lynn's final single to peak at the number one spot.

Lynn's singles in the 1980s reached lower chart positions as the country music industry changed. Her 1982 single "I Lie" became her final top ten hit on the Billboard country chart. In 1985, "Heart Don't Do This to Me" became her final top-twenty and final top-forty hit. After charting with the single "Who Was That Stranger" (1988), Lynn's recording career went into hiatus. She briefly returned in 1993 to collaborate with Dolly Parton and Tammy Wynette on the studio album Honky Tonk Angels. The project's only single "Silver Threads and Golden Needles" reached number sixty eight on the Billboard country chart. "Country in My Genes" was spawned from Still Country (2000), Lynn's first studio album following the death of her husband. The single reached number seventy two on the Hot Country Songs chart. Lynn collaborated with Sheryl Crow and Miranda Lambert in 2010 to re-record "Coal Miner's Daughter", which was released as a single in September.

== Singles ==
=== 1960s ===
List of singles, with selected chart positions, showing other relevant details
Title	Year	Peak chart positions			Album
Title	Year	US Cou.	AUS	CAN Cou.	Album
"I'm a Honky Tonk Girl"	1960	14	—	—	Non-album single
"Heartaches Meet Mr. Blues"	1960	—	—	—	Non-album single
"The Darkest Day"	1961	—	—	—	Non-album single
"I Walked Away from the Wreck"	1961	—	—	—	Loretta Lynn Sings
"Success"	1962	6	—	—	Loretta Lynn Sings
"World of Forgotten People"	1962	—	—	—	Loretta Lynn Sings
"The Other Woman"	1963	13	—	—	Loretta Lynn Sings
"Before I'm Over You"	1963	4	—	—	Before I'm Over You
"Wine, Women and Song"	1964	3	—	—	Before I'm Over You
"Mr. and Mrs. Used to Be" (with Ernest Tubb)	1964	11	—	4	Mr. and Mrs. Used to Be
"Happy Birthday"	1964	3	—	—	Songs from My Heart....
"Blue Kentucky Girl"	1965	7	—	—	Blue Kentucky Girl
"Our Hearts Are Holding Hands" (with Ernest Tubb)	1965	24	—	—	Mr. and Mrs. Used to Be
"The Home You're Tearing Down"	1965	10	—	—	I Like 'em Country
"Dear Uncle Sam"	1966	4	—	—	I Like 'em Country
"You Ain't Woman Enough (To Take My Man)"	1966	2	—	—	You Ain't Woman Enough
"Don't Come Home a Drinkin' (With Lovin' on Your Mind)" (Note: "Don't Come Home a Drinkin' (With Lovin' on Your Mind)" was later re-released to the Australian market in 1974 where it reached its peak position on the Kent Music Report chart.)	1966	1	54	—	Don't Come Home a Drinkin' (With Lovin' on Your Mind)
"To Heck with Ole Santa Claus"	1966	—	—	—	Country Christmas
"Sweet Thang" (with Ernest Tubb)	1967	45	—	—	Singin' Again
"If You're Not Gone Too Long"	1967	7	—	—	Singin' with Feelin'
"What Kind of a Girl (Do You Think I Am)"	1967	5	—	6	Fist City
"Fist City"	1968	1	—	1	Fist City
"You've Just Stepped In (From Stepping Out on Me)"	1968	2	—	—	Your Squaw Is on the Warpath
"Your Squaw Is on the Warpath"	1968	3	—	17	Your Squaw Is on the Warpath
"Woman of the World (Leave My World Alone)"	1969	1	—	—	Woman of the World / To Make a Man
"Who's Gonna Take the Garbage Out" (with Ernest Tubb)	1969	18	—	—	If We Put Our Heads Together
"To Make a Man (Feel Like a Man)"	1969	3	—	—	Woman of the World / To Make a Man
"If We Put Our Heads Together (Our Hearts Will Tell Us What to Do)" (with Ernest Tubb)	1969	—	—	—	If We Put Our Heads Together
"Wings Upon Your Horns"	1969	11	—	4	Wings Upon Your Horns
"—" denotes a recording that did not chart or was not released in that territory.

=== 1970s ===
List of singles, with selected chart positions, showing other relevant details
Title	Year	Peak chart positions					Album
Title	Year	US	US Cou.	AUS	CAN	CAN Cou.	Album
"I Know How"	1970	—	4	—	—	13	Loretta Lynn Writes 'Em & Sings 'Em
"You Wanna Give Me a Lift"	1970	—	6	—	—	4	Loretta Lynn Writes 'Em & Sings 'Em
"Coal Miner's Daughter"	1970	83	1	—	—	1	Coal Miner's Daughter
"I Wanna Be Free"	1971	94	3	—	—	1	I Wanna Be Free
"You're Lookin' at Country"	1971	—	5	—	—	1	You're Lookin' at Country
"One's on the Way"	1971	—	1	14	—	1	One's on the Way
"Here I Am Again"	1972	—	3	—	—	3	Here I Am Again
"Rated "X""	1972	—	1	—	—	1	Entertainer of the Year
"Love Is the Foundation"	1973	— (Note: "Love Is the Foundation" did not enter the Hot 100, but peaked at number 2 on Bubbling Under Hot 100 Singles, which acts as a 25-song extension of the Hot 100.)	1	—	—	1	Love Is the Foundation
"Hey Loretta"	1973	—	3	—	—	1	Love Is the Foundation
"They Don't Make 'em Like My Daddy"	1974	—	4	—	—	1	They Don't Make 'em Like My Daddy
"Trouble in Paradise"	1974	—	1	—	—	14	They Don't Make 'em Like My Daddy
"Shadrack, the Black Reindeer"	1974	—	—	—	—	—	Non-album single
"The Pill"	1975	70	5	87	49	1	Back to the Country
"Home"	1975	—	10	—	—	5	Home
"When the Tingle Becomes a Chill"	1975	—	2	—	—	3	When the Tingle Becomes a Chill
"Red, White and Blue"	1976	—	20	—	—	26	When the Tingle Becomes a Chill
"Somebody Somewhere (Don't Know What He's Missin' Tonight)"	1976	—	1	—	—	1	Somebody Somewhere
"She's Got You"	1977	—	1	—	—	1	I Remember Patsy
"Why Can't He Be You"	1977	—	7	—	—	6	I Remember Patsy
"Out of My Head and Back in My Bed"	1977	—	1	—	—	1	Out of My Head and Back in My Bed
"Spring Fever"	1978	—	12	—	—	10	Out of My Head and Back in My Bed
"We've Come a Long Way Baby"	1978	—	10	—	—	6	We've Come a Long Way, Baby
"I Can't Feel You Anymore"	1979	—	3	—	—	2	We've Come a Long Way, Baby
"I've Got a Picture of Us on My Mind"	1979	—	5	—	—	2	Loretta
"—" denotes a recording that did not chart or was not released in that territory.

=== 1980s ===
List of singles, with selected chart positions, showing other relevant details
Title	Year	Peak chart positions		Album
Title	Year	US Cou.	CAN Cou.	Album
"Pregnant Again"	1980	35	13	Loretta
"Naked in the Rain"	1980	30	11	Loretta
"Cheatin' on a Cheater"	1980	20	21	Lookin' Good
"Somebody Led Me Away"	1981	20	38	Lookin' Good
"Count on Me" (with Count von Count)	1981	—	—	Sesame Country
"I Lie"	1982	9	9	I Lie
"Making Love from Memory"	1982	19	41	Making Love from Memory
"Breakin' It"	1983	39	32	Making Love from Memory
"Lyin', Cheatin', Woman Chasin', Honky Tonkin', Whiskey Drinkin' You"	1983	53	—	Lyin', Cheatin', Woman Chasin', Honky Tonkin', Whiskey Drinkin' You
"Walking with My Memories"	1983	59	—	Lyin', Cheatin', Woman Chasin', Honky Tonkin', Whiskey Drinkin' You
"Heart Don't Do This to Me"	1985	19	42	Just a Woman
"Wouldn't It Be Great"	1985	72	—	Just a Woman
"Just a Woman"	1986	81	—	Just a Woman
"Who Was That Stranger"	1988	57	—	Who Was That Stranger
"Fly Away"	1988	—	88	Who Was That Stranger
"—" denotes a recording that did not chart or was not released in that territory.

=== 1990s–2020s ===
List of singles, with selected chart positions, showing other relevant details
Title	Year	Peak chart positions	Album
Title	Year	US Country	Album
"Silver Threads and Golden Needles" (with Dolly Parton and Tammy Wynette)	1993	68	Honky Tonk Angels
"Country in My Genes"	2000	72	Still Country
"I Can't Hear the Music"	2001	—	Still Country
"Table for Two"	2001	—	Still Country
"Miss Being Mrs."	2004	—	Van Lear Rose
"Portland Oregon" (with Jack White)	2004	—	Van Lear Rose
"Coal Miner's Daughter" (with Sheryl Crow and Miranda Lambert)	2010	55	Coal Miner's Daughter: A Tribute to Loretta Lynn
"Everything It Takes" (featuring Elvis Costello)	2016	—	Full Circle
"Who's Gonna Miss Me?"	2016	—	Full Circle
"Everybody Wants to Go to Heaven"	2016	—	Full Circle
"Half a Mind"	2018	—	King of the Road: A Tribute to Roger Miller
"Wouldn't It Be Great?"	2018	—	Wouldn't It Be Great
"Ruby's Stool"	2018	—	Wouldn't It Be Great
"Ain't No Time to Go"	2018	—	Wouldn't It Be Great
"I Fall to Pieces"	2020	—	Non-album single
"Coal Miner's Daughter" (Recitation)	2021	—	Still Woman Enough
"One's on the Way" (featuring Margo Price)	2021	—	Still Woman Enough
"—" denotes a recording that did not chart or was not released in that territory.

== Other charted songs ==
List of singles, with selected chart positions, showing other relevant details
Title	Year	Peak chart positions	Album	Notes
Title	Year	US Country	Album	Notes
"A Man I Hardly Know"	1967	72	You Ain't Woman Enough	(Note: "A Man I Hardly Know" was first released on the 1966 studio album You Ain't Woman Enough. In 1970, it was issued as the B-side to the single "If You're Not Gone Too Long.")
"There's All Kinds of Smoke (In the Barroom)"	1983	39	Making Love from Memory	(Note: "There's All Kinds of Smoke (In the Barroom)" was released as the B-side to 1983 single "Breakin' It." It charted as a double A-side single, reaching the same position as the A-side. That year, both songs were also released on Lynn's studio album Making Love from Memory.)

== Other appearances ==
Year	Song	Album
2018	"Half a Mind"	King of the Road: A Tribute to Roger Miller

== Music videos ==
List of music videos, showing year released and directors
Title	Year	Director(s)	Ref.
"Honky Tonk Angels Medley" (k.d. lang with Brenda Lee, Loretta Lynn, and Kitty Wells)	1987	David Hogan	
"Silver Threads and Golden Needles" (with Dolly Parton and Tammy Wynette)	1993	Deaton-Flanigen	
"We Need to Make More Memories"	1994	Kenny Starr	
"Country in My Genes" (Version 1)	2000	Bobby Boyd, Kim Christian	
"I Can't Hear the Music" (Live)	2000	—N/a	
"Country in My Genes" (Version 2)	2004	—N/a	
"Miss Being Mrs."	2004	Trey Fanjoy	
"Portland Oregon" (featuring Jack White) (Unreleased Version)	2004	Oliver Gondry	
"Portland Oregon" (featuring Jack White)	2004	Sophie Muller	
"Coal Miner's Daughter" (with Sheryl Crow and Miranda Lambert)	2010	Deaton-Flanigen	
"Lay Me Down" (featuring Willie Nelson)	2016	David McClister	
"Country Christmas"	2016	—N/a	
"Ain't No Time to Go"	2018	David McClister	
"Coal Miner's Daughter" (Recitation)	2021	David McClister	
