= Loretta Lynn's Greatest Hits Vol. II =

Compilation album by Loretta Lynn
- Released: May 13, 1974
- Recorded: January 9, 1968–March 27, 1973
- Studio: Bradley's Barn, Mt. Juliet, Tennessee
- Genre: Country
- Length: 27:11
- Label: MCA
- Producer: Owen Bradley

Loretta Lynn chronology
Love Is the Foundation (1973)	Loretta Lynn's Greatest Hits Vol. II (1974)	Country Partners (1974)

Loretta Lynn's Greatest Hits, Vol. II is a compilation album by American country music singer-songwriter Loretta Lynn. It was released on May 13, 1974, by MCA Records. The album is made up of Lynn's biggest hits between 1968 and 1973.

== Critical reception ==
Professional ratings
Review scores
Source	Rating
Allmusic	4.5/5 stars
Christgau's Record Guide	A−

In the issue dated May 25, 1975, Billboard published a review that said, "This attractive album is exactly what it says it is; an album of Loretta's greatest hits, ranging from "Love Is the Foundation" to "Hey Loretta"."

Cashbox also published a review in their May 25 issue which said, "The sparkling and effervescent quality of Loretta's voice marks her as truly one of the freshest and unique talents on the country music scene. With an approach to music that is vivacious and full of life, Loretta gives her music a heartfelt sincerity that makes listening to her always a fine treat. This new LP is a stunning collection of her greatest hits all put together in this great package. Six cuts out of the eleven songs on the album were penned by Loretta Lynn herself. Included are "One's on the Way", "Your Squaw Is on the Warpath", "Hey Loretta", "Love Is the Foundation", "You're Lookin' at Country", and "I Wanna Be Free"."

== Commercial performance ==
The album peaked at No. 5 on the US Billboard Hot Country LP's chart. The album became Lynn's fourth album to receive a Gold certification from the RIAA, which is awarded to an album that has sold 500,000 copies or more.

== Track listing ==
Side one
No.	Title	Writer(s)	Recording date	Length
1.	"Coal Miner's Daughter"	Loretta Lynn	October 1, 1969	3:00
2.	"I Wanna Be Free"	Lynn	November 25, 1970	2:16
3.	"Wings Upon Your Horns"	Lynn	October 1, 1969	2:35
4.	"Fist City"	Lynn	January 9, 1968	2:10
5.	"You're Lookin' at Country"	Lynn	November 25, 1970	2:15
6.	"Ain't It Funny"	Tracey Lee	December 12, 1972	2:43

Side two
No.	Title	Writer(s)	Recording date	Length
1.	"One's on the Way"	Shel Silverstein	August 3, 1971	2:37
2.	"Your Squaw Is on the Warpath"	Lynn	August 30, 1968	2:02
3.	"What Sundown Does to You"	Carl Knight	March 27, 1973	2:12
4.	"Hey Loretta"	Shel Silverstein	March 27, 1973	2:48
5.	"Love Is the Foundation"	William C. Hall	March 5, 1973	2:26

== Personnel ==
Adapted from the album liner notes and Decca and MCA recording session records.

- Pete Axthelm – liner notes
- Willie Ackerman – drums
- Larry Barbier – photography
- Harold Bradley – bass guitar, electric bass guitar
- Owen Bradley – producer
- Floyd Cramer – piano
- Ray Edenton – acoustic guitar, electric guitar
- Larry Estes – drums
- Buddy Harman – drums
- Junior Huskey – bass
- The Jordanaires – background vocals
- Billy Linneman – bass
- Loretta Lynn – lead vocals
- Grady Martin – guitar, lead electric guitar
- Charlie McCoy – harmonica
- Bob Moore – bass
- Harold Morrison – banjo
- Norbert Putnam – bass
- Hargus Robbins – piano
- Hal Rugg – steel guitar
- Jerry Smith – piano
- Bob Thompson – banjo
- Dave Thornhill – guitar
- Pete Wade – guitar
- Joe Zinkan – bass

== Charts ==
Chart (1974)	Peak position
US Hot Country LP's (Billboard)	5

== Certifications ==
Region	Certification	Certified units/sales
United States (RIAA)	Gold	500,000^{^}
^{^} Shipments figures based on certification alone.
