= Alone with You (album) =

Compilation album by Loretta Lynn
- Released: June 1972
- Recorded: 1961–1964
- Genre: Country; Nashville Sound
- Label: Vocalion
- Producer: Owen Bradley

Loretta Lynn chronology
One's on the Way (1972)	Alone with You (1972)	God Bless America Again (1972)

Alone with You is a compilation album by American country singer-songwriter Loretta Lynn. It was released in June 1972 on Vocalion and was produced by Owen Bradley. It was only Lynn's fourth compilation released in her career and her second with the Coral label. The album contained a series of tracks recorded early in years at Decca Records.

== Background, content and release ==
Alone with You contained material previously issued on Lynn's studio albums in the early 1960s. These songs were originally recorded in sessions held between 1961 and 1964. These sessions were first produced by Owen Bradley, who would work with Lynn throughout her career. Bradley had signed Lynn to Decca Records in 1961. Her earliest material produced by him contained a mix of covers and originals. The compilation contained a total of eleven tracks. Only two of the album's tracks were originally issued as a singles: "I Walked Away from the Wreck" and "World of Forgotten People." Additional album tracks included covers of Roy Drusky's "Alone with You," Bob Wills' "My Shoes Keep Walking Back to You" and Brenda Lee's "Fool No. 1." Three of the album's songs were composed by Lynn herself, including "World of Forgotten People."

Alone with You was first released in June 1972 via Vocalion Records. It was Lynn's fourth compilation album release. It was originally issued as a vinyl LP, containing six songs on "side one" and five songs on "side two." It was later released in Australia and Germany. The album did not reach any peak positions on any music publication charts, including Billboard. It also did not spawn any singles to radio. The album received 2.5 out of 5 stars in a rating conducted by Allmusic.

== Track listing ==
Side one
No.	Title	Writer(s)	Length
1.	"This Haunted House"	Oliver Lynn	2:22
2.	"When Lonely Hits Your Heart"	Loretta Lynn	2:38
3.	"Alone with You"	Roy Drusky; Lester Vanadore	2:14
4.	"World of Forgotten People"	L. Lynn	2:00
5.	"My Shoes Keep Walking Back to You"	Lee Ross; Bob Wills	2:33
6.	"You've Made Me What I Am"	O. Lynn	2:44

Side two
No.	Title	Writer(s)	Length
1.	"It Just Looks That Way"	L. Lynn	2:08
2.	"I Walked Away from the Wreck"	Cindy Walker	2:36
3.	"Fool No. 1"	Kathryn Fulton	2:20
4.	"Loose Talk"	Freddie Hart; Anne Lucas	2:15
5.	"Get Set for a Heartache"	Joe Deaton; Red Landers	1:58

== Personnel ==
All credits are adapted from the liner notes of Alone with You.

Musical and technical personnel

- Owen Bradley – producer
- Loretta Lynn – lead vocals
- Sandy Nelson – package design

== Release history ==
Region	Date	Format	Label	Ref.
Canada	June 1972	Vinyl	Vocalion Records	
United States	June 1972	Vinyl	Vocalion Records	
Germany	June 1972	Vinyl	MCA Coral Records	
United States	1973	Vinyl	MCA Coral Records	
Canada	1973	Vinyl	MCA Coral Records	
Australia	1973	Vinyl	MCA Records	
United States	1980	Vinyl	MCA Records	
