= We've Come a Long Way, Baby =

Studio album by Loretta Lynn
- Released: 1979
- Recorded: Mar. 5, 1973–Feb. 3, 1978
- Studios: Bradley's Barn, Mount Juliet, Tennessee
- Genre: Country
- Length: 25:38
- Label: MCA
- Producer: Owen Bradley

Loretta Lynn chronology
Honky Tonk Heroes (1978)	We've Come a Long Way, Baby (1979)	Diamond Duet (1979)

Singles from We've Come a Long Way, Baby
- 1. "We've Come a Long Way, Baby" Released: October 16, 1978; 2. "I Can't Feel You Anymore" Released: April 23, 1979

Professional ratings
Review scores
Source	Rating
AllMusic	2/5 stars
The Encyclopedia of Popular Music	3/5 stars

We've Come a Long Way, Baby is a studio album by American country music singer-songwriter Loretta Lynn, released in 1979 by MCA Records.

== Commercial performance ==
The album peaked at No. 19 on the Billboard Top Country Albums chart. The album's first single, "We've Come a Long Way, Baby", peaked at No. 10 on the Billboard Hot Country Songs chart. The second single, "I Can't Feel You Anymore", peaked at No. 3.

== Recording ==
Recording sessions for the album took place at Bradley's Barn in Mount Juliet, Tennessee. There were no sessions specifically for this album. The earliest recording featured on the album is "True Love Needs to Keep in Touch", from a March 5, 1973, session for 1973's Love Is the Foundation. "My Conscience Goes to Sleep" was recorded on June 20, 1974, during a session for They Don't Make 'Em Like My Daddy. "The Lady That Lived Here Before" was the third song to be released from the October 8, 1974, session. "Easy Street" was recorded during a December 17, 1974, session for 1975's Back to the Country. Two songs were from sessions for 1976's Somebody Somewhere; "Lullabies to a Memory" and "We've Come a Long Way, Baby", recorded on June 28 and June 29, 1976, respectively. "Between the Preacher and the Lawyer" was the third song to be released from the September 29, 1976, session. The newest recordings to be featured on the album were "I Can't Feel You Anymore" and "Standing at Our Bedroom Door", both recorded on February 3, 1978.

== Track listing ==
Side one
No.	Title	Writer(s)	Recording date	Length
1.	"We've Come a Long Way, Baby"	L. E. White, Shirl Milete	June 29, 1976	2:02
2.	"Easy Street"	Kenny O'Dell	December 17, 1974	2:36
3.	"The Lady That Lived Here Before"	Vera Lakey	October 8, 1974	2:41
4.	"Lullabies to a Memory"	Lola Jean Dillon	June 28, 1976	2:55
5.	"I Can't Feel You Anymore"	Theresa Beaty, Meredith Stewart	February 3, 1978	3:12

Side one
No.	Title	Writer(s)	Recording date	Length
1.	"True Love Needs to Keep in Touch"	Dallas Frazier, Sanger D. Shafer	March 5, 1973	2:25
2.	"My Conscience Goes to Sleep"	Carl Knight	June 20, 1974	2:15
3.	"No Love Left Inside of Me"	Shel Silverstein	June 29, 1976	2:41
4.	"Between the Preacher and the Lawyer"	Lola Jean Dillon	September 29, 1976	2:53
5.	"Standing at Our Bedroom Door"	Theresa Beaty	February 3, 1978	2:10

== Chart positions ==
Album – Billboard (North America)

Year	Chart	Peak position
1979	Country Albums	19

Singles – Billboard (North America)

Year	Single	Chart	Peak position
1978	"We've Come a Long Way, Baby"	Country Singles	10
1979	"I Can't Feel You Anymore"	Country Singles	3
