= Sharon Higgins =

American musician

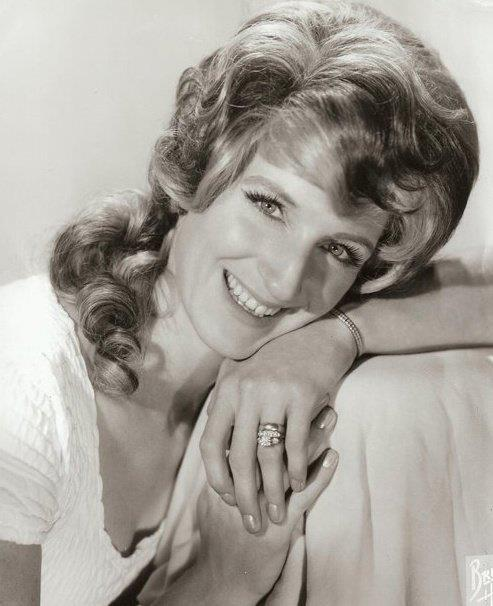
Sharon Higgins, Songwriter

Sharon Higgins (Sharon Rose, born Sharon Rose Black, July 6, 1941 – January 3, 2003) was an American country and gospel songwriter.

== Early life ==
Higgins was born in Bonne Terre, Missouri, United States. Higgins was one of fourteen, her father was killed in a car accident. The loss impacted her and her family greatly and music became an outlet for her and she poured herself into her craft Faith was an important theme throughout Higgins' life. A love of God and family was instilled in her at an early age and she credited the Lord with saving her life at the age of five when she was stricken with pneumonia and whooping cough. After the death of her father August "Gus" Black in 1950, Higgins found it difficult to "fit in" in the large family, but felt it was her duty to take care of the little ones left behind. Her mother, Mildred (Blanton), was forced to work several jobs to support the family. Higgins' education was ultimately put on hold so she could do her part. At the age of 17, Higgins married and left home. By the age of 21, she had her first child. The marriage was tumultuous and ended not long after the birth of their daughter. In an effort to support herself, Higgins went to work and started writing.

== Music Row success ==
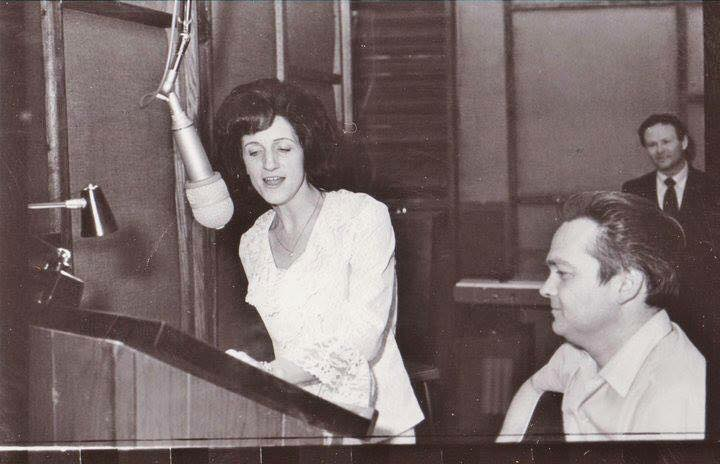
Sharon Higgins with Doyle Wilburn (Wilburn Brothers)

In 1968, Higgins took a job at a factory in St. Louis. While working the assembly line and dealing with revelations in her own marriage, Higgins penned the words to "Woman of the World (Leave My World Alone)". Not long after, she took the very last train from St. Louis to the Union Train Station in Nashville, Tennessee.

The next day, Higgins got up, packed her guitar, and headed to Music Row. She stumbled into the Surefire Music offices of the Wilburn Brothers. The receptionist told her Teddy Wilburn had no openings that day, but Higgins was determined to wait. That evening as Teddy Wilburn started to leave for the day, he saw the 27-year-old woman on the couch. He felt sorry for her and agreed to hear her songs. That meeting changed her life. Wilburn signed her to an artist development deal that very day. She was just the second woman to sign such a deal with the company; the first was Loretta Lynn.

== Early music ==
In 1969, the song "Woman of the World (Leave My World Alone)" was recorded by Loretta Lynn and climbed to #1 on the Billboard Country Music Chart. The song earned Higgins the BMI Citation of Achievement. Higgins found other success with songs like "When You Leave My World" Loretta Lynn, "All I Got Left" Norma Jean, "Love Ain't Gonna Die" Mel Tillis, "The Only Way to Hold Your Man" (title cut) Norma Jean, and "Hold on Woman" Jeannie Pruett.

Higgins also recorded her own music as a recording artist signed to Kapp Records. She released several singles including, "It's a Long Way from Heaven," "Woman Let Go of My Man," and "She Loved All the Love Out of You."

== Marriage and family ==
Higgins was married at the age of 17. The marriage resulted in one child, Sherry Anne, and ended when Higgins was in her early twenties. She met and married Jerry Higgins in 1965, the marriage lasted ten years. The couple had no children. In 1976, Higgins met and married Ray Loafman. In 1980, the couple had a daughter, Bethany Davis (Loafman). The marriage lasted until her death in 2003.

Higgins also helped her siblings find success in country music. Her brother Damon Black was a close friend to Porter Wagoner and the father of bluegrass, Bill Monroe. Both men recorded several of his songs. In addition, Higgins sister Joyce McCord had a hit with "Always Always", a duet by Dolly Parton and Porter Wagoner.

== Music of the 1990s and 2000s ==
In 1992, Higgins' career shot back with the recording of "All of that Love from Here" by Wynonna Judd. The song was a co-write with Kris Bergsnes and Lynn Langham. The album was Wynonna's first solo project after leaving The Judds and it reached triple platinum status. Higgins' faith was the foundation of her life and she loved to write gospel music. "I Saw the Master This Morning", a co-write with Dave Gillon, was recorded by Margie Cumbie and later Bill Harrell and the Virginians. In 2002, The Oak Ridge Boys recorded "Beneath the Christmas Tree" a co-write with Jeff Pearson for their "An Inconvenient Christmas" album. The bluegrass hit "Crazy Heart" was recorded by Lonesome River Band in 2006. Twelve years after her death, her song "Silver Strands," a co-write with Billy and Terry Smith, was recorded by the bluegrass band The Grascals.

== Death ==
Higgins had battled heart problems most of her adult life. On January 2, 2003, she grew ill. She died on January 3, 2003, at her home in White House, Tennessee. She was buried at Hillcrest Cemetery in White House, where her family still resides. She is survived by her husband and both daughters.
