= Am I Not Your Girl? =

Studio album by Sinéad O'Connor
- Released: 14 September 1992
- Recorded: 1991–1992
- Studio: National Edison Studios (New York)
- Genre: Jazz
- Length: 47:38
- Labels: Ensign; Chrysalis
- Producers: Phil Ramone; Sinéad O'Connor

Sinéad O'Connor chronology
I Do Not Want What I Haven't Got (1990)	Am I Not Your Girl? (1992)	Universal Mother (1994)

Singles from Am I Not Your Girl?
- 1. "Success Has Made a Failure of Our Home" Released: 1 September 1992; 2. "Don't Cry for Me Argentina" Released: 23 November 1992

Professional ratings
Review scores
Source	Rating
AllMusic	2/5 stars
Robert Christgau	B
Entertainment Weekly	A−
NME	9/10
Orlando Sentinel	1/3 stars
People	unfavorable
Rolling Stone	2/5 stars
Select	1/5
USA Today	2.5/4 stars
The Vancouver Sun	3.5/5 stars

Am I Not Your Girl? is the third studio album by Irish singer Sinéad O'Connor. It is a collection of covers of mostly jazz standards, which O'Connor describes as "the songs I grew up listening to [and] that made me want to be a singer". The album title comes from the song "Success Has Made a Failure of Our Home". The album is dedicated to the people of New York City and especially the homeless whom O'Connor met at St. Mark's Place.

The album did not gain much critical acclaim or commercial success, in part because its decades-old songs deviated sharply from O'Connor previous work in the pop-rock and art-rock genres such as her hugely successful I Do Not Want What I Haven't Got. The muted reaction to the album led to O'Connor's career losing much of the commercial momentum she had built up to that point, especially when coupled with the album's confessional liner notes and the Garden State Arts Center controversy when she refused to perform after the US national anthem.

The album's promotion was marked by a controversial appearance on Saturday Night Live, where O'Connor tore up a photo of Pope John Paul II, leading to public and media scrutiny.

== Promotion ==
On 3 October 1992, O'Connor appeared on Saturday Night Live as a musical guest, and sang the album's lead single, "Success Has Made a Failure of Our Home". She was then scheduled to sing "Scarlet Ribbons" from the album, but the day before the appearance she changed to "War", a Bob Marley song which she intended as a protest against sexual abuse of children in the Catholic Church, referring to child abuse rather than racism. During the performance O'Connor wore a necklace with the Rastafari star and also had a scarf with the Rastafari and Ethiopian colors of red, green, and gold. She then presented a photo of Pope John Paul II to the camera while singing the word "evil", after which she tore the photo into pieces, while saying "Fight the real enemy".

O'Connor's action led into a public and media frenzy. NBC received more than 500 calls on Sunday, and 400 more on Monday, with all but seven criticising O'Connor; the network received 4,400 calls in total. Contrary to rumour, NBC was not fined by the Federal Communications Commission for O'Connor's act, as her behaviour did not breach any regulatory rule for broadcast content.. NBC did not edit the performance out of the West Coast tape-delayed broadcast that night.

== Track listing ==
Am I Not Your Girl? track listing
No.	Title	Writer(s)	Length
1.	"Why Don't You Do Right?"	Kansas Joe McCoy	2:30
2.	"Bewitched, Bothered and Bewildered"	Lorenz Hart, Richard Rodgers	6:15
3.	"Secret Love"	Sammy Fain, Paul Francis Webster	2:56
4.	"Black Coffee"	Sonny Burke, Paul Francis Webster	3:21
5.	"Success Has Made a Failure of Our Home"	Johnny Mullins	4:29
6.	"Don't Cry for Me Argentina"	Andrew Lloyd Webber, Tim Rice	5:39
7.	"I Want to Be Loved by You"	Bert Kalmar, Harry Ruby, Herbert Stothart	2:45
8.	"Gloomy Sunday"	László Jávor, Sam L. Lewis, Rezső Seress	3:56
9.	"Love Letters"	Edward Heyman, Victor Young	3:07
10.	"How Insensitive"	Vinicius de Moraes, Norman Gimbel, Antônio Carlos Jobim	3:28
11.	"Scarlet Ribbons"	Evelyn Danzig, Jack Segal	4:14
12.	"Don't Cry for Me Argentina" (Instrumental)	Andrew Lloyd Webber, Tim Rice	5:10
13.	"Personal message about pain (Jesus and the Money Changers)" (Hidden track)	O'Connor	2:00

=== Japanese release ===
Three exclusive bonus tracks only appear on some copies of the original Japanese release of this album: "My Heart Belongs to Daddy", "Almost in Your Arms" and "Fly Me to the Moon".

== Personnel ==
Musicians

- Sinéad O'Connor – vocals
- Richard Tee – acoustic piano
- David LeBolt – synthesizers
- Ira Siegel – guitars
- David Finck – bass
- Chris Parker – drums (1–4, 6–12)
- John Reynolds – drums (5)
- Jerry O'Sullivan – Uilleann pipes (11)
- Joanie Madden – tin whistle (11)

Orchestra

- Patrick Williams – arrangements (1)
- Torrie Zito – conductor (1, 3, 4, 6, 8, 9, 12), arrangements (3, 4, 6, 8, 9, 12)
- Rob Mounsey – arrangements and conductor (2, 10)
- Doug Katsaros –arrangements and conductor (5)
- Sid Ramin – arrangements and conductor (7)
- Sinéad O'Connor – arrangements (11)

Brass and Woodwinds

- Dennis Anderson – alto saxophone, flute
- Dave Tofani – alto saxophone, flute
- Ronnie Cuber – baritone saxophone, bass clarinet
- Ted Nash – tenor saxophone, clarinet
- Gerry Niewood – tenor saxophone, clarinet
- Shelly Woodworth – English horn, oboe
- George Flynn – bass trombone
- Kim Allan Cissel – trombone
- Birch Johnson – trombone
- Keith O'Quinn – trombone
- Jim Pugh – trombone
- Robert Millikan – trumpet, flugelhorn
- Brian O'Flaherty – trumpet, flugelhorn
- Alan Rubin – trumpet, flugelhorn
- Joe Shepley – trumpet, flugelhorn
- Lew Soloff – trumpet, flugelhorn
- Dave Braynard – tuba
- Bob Carlisle – French horn
- John Clark – French horn
- Fred Griffin – French horn

Strings

- Richard Locker – cello
- Charles McCracken – cello
- Fred Zlotkin – cello
- Gloria Agostini – harp
- Lamar Alsop – viola
- Julien Barber – viola
- Jesse Levine – viola
- Elena Barere – violin
- Arnold Eidus – violin
- Barry Finclair – violin
- Charles Libove – violin
- Alan Martin – violin
- Nancy McAlhany – violin
- Jan Mullen – violin
- David Nadien – violin, concertmaster
- John Pintavalle – violin
- Matthew Raimondi – violin
- Laura Seaton – violin
- Richard Sortomme – violin
- Marti Sweet – violin
- Gerald Tarack – violin
- Donna Tecco – violin

== Production ==
- Sinéad O'Connor – producer
- Phil Ramone – producer, mixing
- Gary Chester – engineer, mixing
- Tommy Civello – assistant engineer
- Yvonne Yedibalian – assistant engineer
- Greg Calbi – mastering at Sterling Sound (New York, NY)
- Jill Dell'Abate – project coordinator
- Kate Garner – photography
- Pure Management – management

== Charts ==
=== Weekly charts ===
Weekly chart performance for Am I Not Your Girl?
Chart (1992)	Peak position
Australian Albums (ARIA)	17
Austrian Albums (Ö3 Austria)	9
Dutch Albums (Album Top 100)	15
German Albums (Offizielle Top 100)	24
New Zealand Albums (RMNZ)	5
Swedish Albums (Sverigetopplistan)	16
Swiss Albums (Schweizer Hitparade)	11
UK Albums (Official Charts)	6
US Billboard 200	27
Canada Top Albums/CDs (RPM)	11
Finnish Albums (The Official Finnish Charts)	18

=== Year-end charts ===
1992 year-end chart performance for Am I Not Your Girl?
Chart (1992)	Position
Dutch Albums (Album Top 100)	82

1993 year-end chart performance for Am I Not Your Girl?
Chart (1993)	Position
Dutch Albums (Album Top 100)	63

== Certifications and sales ==
Certifications and sales for Am I Not Your Girl?
Region	Certification	Certified units/sales
Netherlands (NVPI)	Gold	50,000^{^}
Spain (Promusicae)	Gold	50,000^{^}
Switzerland (IFPI Switzerland)	Gold	25,000^{^}
United Kingdom (BPI)	Gold	100,000^{^}
United States	—	306,000
Summaries
Worldwide	—	1,200,000
^{^} Shipments figures based on certification alone.
