= Loretta Lynn Sings =

Studio album by Loretta Lynn
- Released: December 9, 1963
- Recorded: 1961–1963
- Studio: Bradley, Nashville, Tennessee
- Genre: Country; Nashville sound
- Length: 30:04
- Label: Decca
- Producer: Owen Bradley

Loretta Lynn chronology
Loretta Lynn Sings (1963)	Before I'm Over You (1964)

Singles from Loretta Lynn Sings
- 1. "I Walked Away from the Wreck" Released: November 1961; 2. "Success" Released: April 1962; 3. "World of Forgotten People" Released: October 1962; 4. "The Other Woman" Released: March 1963

Loretta Lynn Sings is the debut studio album by American country singer-songwriter Loretta Lynn. It was released on December 9, 1963, via Decca Records and was produced by Owen Bradley. The album contained songs recorded shortly after she had signed with the Decca label. In total, four singles were released from the album. Two of these singles became major hits on the Billboard country chart. This included "Success", which became Lynn's first top ten hit. The album was received positively by critics and writers alike.

== Background and content ==
In 1960, Loretta Lynn had her first hit single with the self-penned "I'm a Honky Tonk Girl." She then moved to Nashville, Tennessee with her family to further establish her music career. Under the supervision and mentoring of The Wilburn Brothers, Lynn signed a new contract with the larger Decca Records. At the label, Lynn would have her breakthrough success and record her debut album. Loretta Lynn Sings was recorded in several sessions held between 1961 and 1963 at the Bradley Studios, later operating as the Columbia Studio, in Nashville's Music Row. The sessions were produced by the studio's co-founder, Owen Bradley. It was Bradley who helped establish Lynn's musical sound at Decca, which further elevated her success in later years.

Loretta Lynn Sings contained a total of 12 tracks. Three of these tracks were composed by Lynn: "The Girl That I Am Now," "World of Forgotten People" and "Hundred Proof Heartache." Additional tracks on the album were composed by other songwriters, including Johnny Mullins and Cindy Walker. Of these songs, several of them were first recorded and made hits by other artists. The second track, "The Minute You're Gone," was first a pop hit by Cliff Richard. Another track, "Act Naturally," was first a number one country hit by Buck Owens. Additionally, "Color of the Blues" had been a hit for George Jones, while "Lonesome 7-7203" was cut first by Hawkshaw Hawkins.

== Critical reception ==
Professional ratings
Review scores
Source	Rating
AllMusic	3/5 stars

Loretta Lynn Sings received positive reviews from music writers and critics. In a December 1963 issue of Billboard, writers praised the album's material as well as Lynn's own singing. "Miss Lynn sings up a storm on this fine new album, on songs by herself and various other good country writers."

== Release and chart performance ==
Loretta Lynn Sings was first released on December 9, 1963, via Decca Records. It was Lynn's debut studio album. It was issued as a vinyl LP, containing six songs on each side of the record. The album charted the Billboard Top Country Albums survey between 1963 and 1964 and peaked at number two. It would be the first of many albums by Lynn to make the country albums list. Loretta Lynn Sings included four singles that had been released between 1961 and 1963. It first single was the track "I Walked Away from the Wreck." Released in November 1961, failed to chart any Billboard publications. The following year, "Success" was issued as the album's second single in April 1962. It peaked at number six on the Billboard Hot Country Singles chart, becoming Lynn's first top ten hit single. The self-composed "World of Forgotten People" was then released as a single in October 1962, but failed to chart. The fourth and final single release was "The Other Woman" in February 1963. The single became Lynn's third major hit in her career, peaking at number 13 on the Billboard country songs chart.

== Track listing ==
Side one
No.	Title	Writer(s)	Length
1.	"Success"	Johnny Mullins	2:39
2.	"The Minute You're Gone"	Jimmy Gateley	2:32
3.	"The Other Woman"	Betty Sue Perry	2:28
4.	"Alone with You"	Roy Drusky; Lester Vanadore	2:15
5.	"Why I'm Walkin'"	Melvin Endsley; Stonewall Jackson	2:24
6.	"The Girl That I Am Now"	Loretta Lynn	2:16

Side two
No.	Title	Writer(s)	Length
1.	"Act Naturally"	Voni Morrison; Johnny Russell	2:29
2.	"World of Forgotten People"	Lynn	2:01
3.	"Color of the Blues"	George Jones; Lawton Williams	2:56
4.	"A Hundred Proof Heartache"	Lynn	2:27
5.	"I Walked Away from the Wreck"	Cindy Walker	2:37
6.	"Lonesome 7-7203"	Justin Tubb	3:00

== Personnel ==
All credits are adapted from the liner notes of Loretta Lynn Sings.

Musical personnel

- Willie Ackerman – drums
- Harold Bradley – electric guitar
- Cecil Brower – fiddle
- Floyd Cramer – piano
- Buddy Harman – drums
- Don Helms – steel guitar
- Tommy Jackson – fiddle
- The Jordanaires – background vocals
- Loretta Lynn – lead vocals
- Grady Martin – electric guitar
- Bob Moore – bass
- Wayne Moss – electric guitar
- Teddy Wilburn – guitar

Technical personnel

- Hal Bauksbaum – photography
- Owen Bradley – producer

== Chart performance ==
Chart (1963–1964)	Peak position
US Top Country Albums (Billboard)	2

== Release history ==
Region	Date	Format	Label	Ref.
United States	December 9, 1963	Vinyl	Decca Records	
