= If We Put Our Heads Together =

Studio album by Ernest Tubb and Loretta Lynn
- Released: June 9, 1969
- Recorded: February 18–April 1, 1969
- Studio: Bradley's Barn, Mount Juliet, Tennessee
- Genre: Country
- Length: 28:03
- Label: Decca
- Producer: Owen Bradley

Ernest Tubb and Loretta Lynn chronology
Singin' Again (1967)	If We Put Our Heads Together (1969)

Ernest Tubb chronology
Let's Turn Back the Years (1969)	If We Put Our Heads Together (1969)	Saturday Satan Sunday Saint (1969)

Loretta Lynn chronology
Your Squaw Is on the Warpath (1969)	If We Put Our Heads Together (1969)	Woman of the World/To Make a Man (1969)

Singles from If We Put Our Heads Together
- 1. "Who's Gonna Take the Garbage Out?" Released: May 5, 1969; 2. "If We Put Our Heads Together (Our Hearts Will Tell Us What to Do)" Released: September 29, 1969

If We Put Our Heads Together is the third and final collaborative studio album by American country music artists Ernest Tubb and Loretta Lynn. It was released on June 9, 1969, by Decca Records.

== Critical reception ==
Professional ratings
Review scores
Source	Rating
AllMusic	3/5 stars

The review published in the June 21, 1969 issue of Billboard said, "This is must merchandise for the dealer. Devotees of country music will find it very difficult to lay this package down inasmuch as the combined sales power of Ernest Tubb and Loretta Lynn is tremendous. They do some great duets, including the hit single, "Who's Gonna Take the Garbage Out" and "Let's Wait a Little Longer", "That Odd Couple" and others."

Cashbox published a review in the June 28 issue which said, "The dynamic duo of Ernest Tubb and Loretta Lynn return for their third LP which spotlights the twosome performing their latest chart rising single in addition to other fine ballad and up tempo delights. Included, besides the title track, are "Who's Gonna Take the Garbage Out?", "Holding on to Nothing", "Chased You Till You Caught Me", "Let the World Keep on a Turnin'", "That Odd Couple" and five more. Fine set."

== Commercial performance ==
The album peaked on the US Billboard Hot Country LP's chart at No. 19.

The first single from the album, "Who's Gonna Take the Garbage Out?", was released in May 1969 and peaked at No. 18 on the US Billboard Hot Country Singles chart. The second single, "If We Put Our Heads Together (Our Hearts Will Tell Us What to Do)", was released in September 1969 and did not chart.

== Recording ==
Recording of the album took place over three sessions at Bradley's Barn in Mount Juliet, Tennessee, beginning on February 18, 1969. Two additional sessions followed on March 11 and April 1.

== Track listing ==
Side one
No.	Title	Writer(s)	Recording date	Length
1.	"Who's Gonna Take the Garbage Out?"	Johnny Tillotson; Teddy Wilburn	February 18, 1969	2:12
2.	"Holding on to Nothing"	Jerry Chesnut	March 11, 1969	2:33
3.	"Somewhere Between"	Merle Haggard; Bonnie Owens	March 11, 1969	2:45
4.	"I Chased You Till You Caught Me"	Wayne D. Walker	February 18, 1969	2:18
5.	"Let's Wait a Little Longer"	Curly Putman; Billy Sherrill	March 11, 1969	3:15
6.	"Won't You Come Home (And Talk to a Stranger)"	Wayne Kemp	April 1, 1969	2:15

Side two
No.	Title	Writer(s)	Recording date	Length
1.	"Let the World Keep on Turnin'"	Buck Owens	April 1, 1969	2:07
2.	"If We Put Our Heads Together (Our Hearts Will Tell Us What to Do)"	Lorene Allen; Loretta Lynn	February 18, 1969	3:12
3.	"That Odd Couple"	Betty Amos	April 1, 1969	1:56
4.	"Touch and Go"	Darrell Statler	April 1, 1969	2:48
5.	"I Won't Cheat Again on You (If You Won't Cheat on Me)"	Milton L. Brown	February 18, 1969	2:42

== Personnel ==
Adapted from the album liner notes and Decca recording session records.

- Harold Bradley – drums
- Owen Bradley – producer
- Steve Chapman – guitar
- Buddy Charleton – steel guitar
- Floyd Cramer – piano
- Erroll Jernigan – fiddle
- Loretta Lynn – lead vocals
- Billy Parker – guitar
- Hargus Robbins – piano
- Noel Stanley – bass
- Ernest Tubb – lead vocals
- James Wilkerson – drums

== Charts ==
Album

Chart (1969)	Peak position
US Hot Country LP's (Billboard)	19

Singles

Title	Year	Peak position
Title	Year	US Country
"Who's Gonna Take the Garbage Out?"	1969	18
"If We Put Our Heads Together (Our Hearts Will Tell Us What to Do)"	1969	—
