= Before I'm Over You =

Studio album by Loretta Lynn
- Released: June 22, 1964
- Recorded: 1962–1964
- Studio: Bradley Studios, Nashville, Tennessee
- Genre: Country; Nashville Sound
- Length: 28:04
- Label: Decca
- Producer: Owen Bradley

Loretta Lynn chronology
Loretta Lynn Sings (1964)	Before I'm Over You (1964)	Songs from My Heart... (1965)

Singles from Before I'm Over You
- 1. "Before I'm Over You" Released: October 1963; 2. "Wine, Women and Song" Released: April 1964

Before I'm Over You is a studio album by American country singer-songwriter Loretta Lynn. It was released on June 22, 1964 via Decca Records and was produced by Owen Bradley. It was Lynn's second studio album issued in her recording career and contained a total of 12 tracks. Two songs from the record were released as a singles and became major hits on the Billboard country chart: the title track and "Wine, Women and Song." The album received positive reception from music publications after its release.

== Background and content ==
Before I'm Over You was Lynn's second studio album and second with the Decca label. Lynn had previously recorded and released singles for the Zero label, which brought her first major hit in 1960. With the assistance of The Wilburn Brothers, Lynn signed with Decca Records in 1961 and released her first album with the label in 1963. Sessions for her second album took place between 1962 and 1964 at the Bradley Studios, later operating as the Columbia Studio, in Nashville's Music Row. All of the sessions were produced by the studio's co-founder, Owen Bradley.

The album consisted of 12 tracks. One of these tracks were self-composed by Lynn herself ("Where Were You") and another was composed by her husband ("This Haunted House.") The latter song was written about the death of Patsy Cline, who was Lynn's good friend and mentor. Additional songs on the album were written by other songwriters and some had also been recorded previously. This included "Loose Talk," which was first a major country hit for Carl Smith. Also featured is a cover of Bob Wills's "My Shoes Keep Walking Back to You" and Brenda Lee's "Fool No. 1." Lynn had originally recorded the demonstration tape of "Fool No. 1" before even being signed to Decca Records. Lynn's version was heard by producer Owen Bradley, who signed her to the record label shortly after receiving the demo recording. Lynn re-recorded the song for Decca for this release.

== Release and reception ==
Professional ratings
Review scores
Source	Rating
Allmusic	3/5 stars
Billboard	Favorable

Before I'm Over You was released on June 22, 1964 via Decca Records and was Lynn's second studio album released in her career. It was issued as a vinyl LP, containing six songs on each side of the record. Before I'm Over You became Lynn's second album release to also reach the Billboard Top Country Albums chart, peaking at number 11 in 1964.

The album also included two singles that were previously released and became major hits. The first single to become a hit was the title track, which was released in October 1963. The song became Lynn's second top ten hit, reaching number four on the Billboard Hot Country Singles chart in 1964. "Wine, Women and Song" was released as the next single in April 1964, which reached number three on the Billboard country chart. Before I'm Over You received positive reviews upon its release. Billboard magazine gave it a favorable review in June 1964. "Loretta Lynn is a fine country artist. She sings with genuine feeling and honesty of approach," they wrote. In later years, the album received three out of five stars in a rating conducted by Allmusic.

== Track listing ==
Side one
No.	Title	Writer(s)	Length
1.	"Singing the Blues"	Melvin Endsley	2:04
2.	"Before I'm Over You"	Betty Sue Perry	2:30
3.	"You Don't Have to Be a Baby to Cry"	Bob Merrill; Terry Shand	2:06
4.	"Who'll Help Me Get Over You"	Perry	2:45
5.	"Loose Talk"	Freddie Hart; Ann Lucas	2:16
6.	"Where Were You"	Loretta Lynn	2:29

Side two
No.	Title	Writer(s)	Length
1.	"Wine, Women and Song"	Perry	2:02
2.	"The End of the World"	Arthur Kent; Sylvia Dee	2:44
3.	"My Shoes Keep Walking Back to You"	Lee Ross; Bob Wills	2:34
4.	"Fool No. 1"	Kathryn R. Fulton	2:11
5.	"This Haunted House"	Oliver Lynn	2:23
6.	"Get Set for a Heartache"	Joe Deaton; Red Landers	2:00

== Personnel ==
All credits are adapted from the liner notes of Before I'm Over You.

Musical personnel

- Harold Bradley – electric guitar
- Cecil Brower – fiddle
- Floyd Cramer – piano
- Buddy Harman – drums
- Don Helms – steel guitar
- Tommy Jackson – fiddle
- The Jordanaires – background vocals
- Jerry Kennedy – guitar
- Loretta Lynn – lead vocals
- Grady Martin – electric guitar
- Bob Moore – bass
- Jack Pruett – electric guitar
- Teddy Wilburn – guitar

Technical personnel

- Owen Bradley – producer
- Hal Buksbaum – photography
- Johnny Mullins – liner notes

== Chart performance ==
Chart (1964)	Peak position
US Top Country Albums (Billboard)	11

== Release history ==
Region	Date	Format	Label	Ref.
Canada	June 22, 1964	Vinyl	Decca Records	
United States	June 22, 1964	Vinyl	Decca Records	
