= Who's Gonna Take the Garbage Out =

Single by Loretta Lynn and Ernest Tubb

from the album If We Put Our Heads Together
- B-side: "Somewhere Between"
- Released: May 1969
- Recorded: February 18, 1969
- Studio: Bradley's Barn, Mount Juliet, Tennessee
- Genre: Country
- Label: Decca
- Songwriter(s): Johnny Tillotson; Teddy Wilburn
- Producer(s): Owen Bradley

Loretta Lynn and Ernest Tubb singles chronology
"Sweet Thang" (1968)	"Who's Gonna Take the Garbage Out" (1969)	"If We Put Our Heads Together" (1969)

"Who's Gonna Take the Garbage Out" is a song written by Johnny Tillotson and Teddy Wilburn that was originally performed by American country music artists Loretta Lynn and Ernest Tubb. It was released as a single in May 1969 via Decca Records.

== Background and reception ==
"Who's Gonna Take the Garbage Out" was recorded at Bradley's Barn in Mount Juliet, Tennessee on February 18, 1969, with the sessions produced by the studio's owner, renowned country music producer Owen Bradley. Three additional tracks were recorded during this session.

"Who's Gonna Take the Garbage Out" reached number eighteen on the Billboard Hot Country Singles survey in 1969. It was included on their studio album, If We Put Our Heads Together (1969).

== Charts ==
=== Weekly charts ===
Chart (1969)	Peak position
US Hot Country Singles (Billboard)	18

== Cover Versions ==
- 2016 - John Prine recorded the song with Iris DeMent for the For Better, or Worse album
