= Coal Miner's Daughter (album) =

Studio album by Loretta Lynn
- Released: January 4, 1971
- Recorded: May 28, 1969–August 19, 1970
- Studios: Bradley's Barn, Mount Juliet, Tennessee
- Genre: Country
- Length: 28:17
- Label: Decca
- Producer: Owen Bradley

Loretta Lynn chronology
Loretta Lynn Writes 'Em and Sings 'Em (1970)	Coal Miner's Daughter (1971)	We Only Make Believe (1971)

Singles from Coal Miner's Daughter
- 1. "Coal Miner's Daughter" Released: October 5, 1970

Coal Miner's Daughter is the sixteenth solo studio album by American country music singer-songwriter Loretta Lynn. It was released on January 4, 1971, by Decca Records.

The title song would go on to become Lynn's signature song. The album and song's title would later be used for the name of Lynn's best-selling autobiography as well as the 1980 Oscar-winning movie starring Sissy Spacek. It was also listed at No. 440 on Rolling Stone's 2020 ranking of the 500 Greatest Albums of All Time.

== Critical reception ==
Professional ratings
Review scores
Source	Rating
AllMusic	4.5/5 stars

In the issue dated January 16, 1971, Billboard published a review of the album that said, "The one and only Loretta Lynn has cut another great package here. The material is done in distinctive style, retaining true country flavor. "Coal Miner's Daughter", "Less of Me", "The Man of the House" are typical. Must merchandise."

Cashbox also published a review in their January 16 issue which said, "Loretta Lynn has long been one of country music's most outstanding and most important female vocalists. She is a writer as well as an interpreter of feelings and emotions. "Coal Miner's Daughter", her most recent top 5 single record is the true story of Loretta and her father, a coal miner in Kentucky. After listening to that cut several times, you can begin to appreciate the sincerity that went into the session with Loretta. Also included in the package are "Hello Darlin'", "Snowbird", "For the Good Times", "What Makes Me Tick", and six other moving selections."

Record World's review of the album said, "Pretty cover, pretty singing, pretty girl! Contents run like this: "Less of Me", "Anyone, Any Worse, Any Where" are super fine; "For the Good Times" is oversung but she really sinks her teeth into "Man of the House". "Another Man Loved Me Last Night" is ready for everything but airplay and she should have found "Snowbird" first. All in all, it's a good outing but the world needs an all-Loretta penned album."

== Commercial performance ==
The album peaked at No. 4 on the US Billboard Hot Country LP's chart and at No. 81 on the US Billboard Top LP's chart. The album was certified Gold by the RIAA in 1983 for shipping 500,000 copies, becoming Lynn's third Gold album.

The album's only single, "Coal Miner's Daughter", was released in October 1970 and peaked at No. 1 on the US Billboard Hot Country Singles chart, and at No. 83 on the US Billboard Hot 100 chart. In Canada, the single peaked at No. 1 on the RPM Country Singles chart.

== Recording ==
Recording sessions for the album took place at Bradley's Barn in Mount Juliet, Tennessee, on April 9, July 14 and 15, and August 19, 1970. Five of the album's eleven tracks were recorded during sessions for previous albums. "Coal Miner's Daughter" had been recorded during the October 1, 1969 session for 1970's Wings Upon Your Horns. "It'll Be Open Season on You" was recorded on May 28, 1969, during a session for 1969's Woman of the World/To Make a Man. Three songs were recorded during sessions for 1970's Loretta Lynn Writes 'Em and Sings 'Em. "What Makes Me Tick" was recorded on December 22, 1969, while "Any One, Any Worse, Any Where" and "Another Man Loved Me Last Night" were recorded on December 23, 1969.

== Track listing ==
Side one
No.	Title	Writer(s)	Recording date	Length
1.	"Coal Miner's Daughter"	Loretta Lynn	October 1, 1969	3:00
2.	"Hello Darlin'"	Conway Twitty	July 14, 1970	2:22
3.	"Less of Me"	Glen Campbell	July 15, 1970	2:11
4.	"Any One, Any Worse, Any Where"	Lorene Allen; Lynn	December 23, 1969	2:44
5.	"For the Good Times"	Kris Kristofferson	August 19, 1970	3:15
6.	"The Man of the House"	Larry Brinkley; Lee McAlpin	July 14, 1970	2:47

Side two
No.	Title	Writer(s)	Recording date	Length
1.	"What Makes Me Tick"	Lynn	December 22, 1969	2:00
2.	"Another Man Loved Me Last Night"	Allen; Peggy Sue Wells	December 23, 1969	2:32
3.	"It'll Be Open Season on You"	Charlie Aldridge	May 28, 1969	2:39
4.	"Too Far"	Marty Robbins	April 9, 1970	3:10
5.	"Snowbird"	Gene MacLellan	August 19, 1970	2:22

== Personnel ==
Adapted from the album liner notes and Decca recording session records.

- Harold Bradley – bass guitar, electric bass guitar
- Owen Bradley – producer
- Ray Edenton – guitar, acoustic guitar
- Buddy Harman – drums
- Junior Huskey – bass
- Darrell Johnson – mastering
- The Jordanaires – background vocals
- Loretta Lynn – lead vocals
- Grady Martin – guitar, lead electric guitar
- Bob Moore – bass
- Hargus Robbins – piano
- Hal Rugg – steel guitar, Dobro
- Jerry Stembridge – acoustic guitar
- Bobby Thompson – banjo
- Pete Wade – guitar
- Doyle Wilburn – liner notes
- Jim Williamson – engineer

== Charts ==
Album

Chart (1971)	Peak position
US Hot Country LP's (Billboard)	4
US Top LP's (Billboard)	81

Singles

Title	Year	Peak position		
Title	Year	US Country	US	CAN Country
"Coal Miner's Daughter"	1970	1	83	1

== Certifications ==
Region	Certification	Certified units/sales
United States (RIAA)	Gold	500,000^{^}
^{^} Shipments figures based on certification alone.
