= Loretta Lynn Writes 'Em and Sings 'Em =

Compilation album by Loretta Lynn
- Released: June 8, 1970
- Recorded: November 15, 1965–December 23, 1969
- Studios: Bradley's Barn (Mount Juliet, Tennessee); Columbia (Nashville, Tennessee)
- Genre: Country
- Length: 26:34
- Label: Decca
- Producer: Owen Bradley

Loretta Lynn chronology
Wings Upon Your Horns (1970)	Loretta Lynn Writes 'Em and Sings 'Em (1970)	Coal Miner's Daughter (1971)

Singles from Loretta Lynn Writes 'Em and Sings 'Em
- 1. "I Know How" Released: February 9, 1970; 2. "You Wanna Give Me a Lift" Released: May 25, 1970

Loretta Lynn Writes 'Em and Sings 'Em is a compilation album by American country music singer-songwriter Loretta Lynn. It was released on June 8, 1970, by Decca Records. The album is composed of five previously released recordings and six new recordings.

Lynn wrote all the songs on the album, except one co-written song with her sister, Peggy Sue Wells. This was Lynn's first album to be made up entirely of songs written by her.

== Critical reception ==
Professional ratings
Review scores
Source	Rating
AllMusic	4.5/5 stars
Christgau's Record Guide	A−

In the issue dated June 27, 1970, Billboard published a review that said, "In the tradition of country greats, Loretta Lynn is an outstanding writer as well as a singer. Here she proves it, for the songs are her own, including the big single "I Know How". Others are "What's the Bottle Done to My Baby", "Your Squaw Is on the Warpath" and "Fist City". Must merchandise."

Cashbox published a review in the June 20, 1970 issue which said, "Loretta Lynn is showcased singing eleven of her own songs, and this includes, of course, a number of her hits. "I Know How", her recent smash, is here as well as her brand-new charter, "You Wanna Give Me A Lift". Also included are past hits "Wings Upon Your Horns", "Your Squaw Is on the Warpath", and "Fist City". This will be a very, very big album."

== Commercial performance ==
The album peaked at No. 8 on the US Billboard Hot Country LP's chart.

The first single, "I Know How" was released in February 1970 and peaked at No. 4 on the US Billboard Hot Country Singles chart. "You Wanna Give Me a Lift" was issued as the second single in May 1970 and peaked at No. 6.

== Recording ==
Recording sessions for the new songs featured on the album took place at Bradley's Barn in Mount Juliet, Tennessee, on December 8, 22 and 23, 1969. Two of the new songs were recorded during sessions for previous albums. "What Has the Bottle Done to My Baby" was recorded during a session for 1969's Woman of the World/To Make a Man on May 28, 1969. "You Wanna Give Me a Lift" was recorded during the October 1, 1969 session for 1970's Wings Upon Your Horns.

All of the songs featured on the album were recorded at Bradley's Barn except for "You Ain't Woman Enough (To Take My Man), which was recorded at Columbia Recording Studios in Nashville on November 15, 1965.

== Track listing ==
All tracks are written by Loretta Lynn, except where noted.

Side one
No.	Title	Recording date	Length
1.	"I Know How"	December 23, 1969	2:31
2.	"What Has the Bottle Done to My Baby"	May 28, 1969	2:40
3.	"The One You Need"	December 8, 1969	2:21
4.	"Your Squaw Is on the Warpath" (from Your Squaw Is on the Warpath)	August 30, 1968	2:02
5.	"You Ain't Woman Enough (To Take My Man)" (from You Ain't Woman Enough)	November 15, 1965	2:11
6.	"Crazy Out of My Mind"	December 22, 1969	2:43

Side two
No.	Title	Writer(s)	Recording date	Length
1.	"You Wanna Give Me a Lift"	Lynn; Peggy Sue Wells	October 1, 1969	2:32
2.	"Wings Upon Your Horns" (from Wings Upon Your Horns)		October 1, 1969	2:35
3.	"To Make a Man (Feel Like a Man)" (from Woman of the World/To Make a Man)		May 28, 1969	2:15
4.	"Deep as Your Pocket"		December 22, 1969	2:34
5.	"Fist City" (from Fist City)		January 9, 1968	2:10

== Personnel ==
Adapted from the album liner notes and Decca recording session records.

- Harold Bradley – electric bass guitar
- Owen Bradley – producer
- David Briggs – piano
- Floyd Cramer – piano
- Ray Edenton – acoustic guitar
- Ralph Emery – liner notes
- Larry Estes – drums
- Buddy Harman – drums
- Junior Huskey – bass
- The Jordanaires – background vocals
- Loretta Lynn – lead vocals
- Grady Martin – electric guitar
- Bob Moore – bass
- Harold Morrison – banjo
- Norbert Putnam – bass
- Hargus Robbins – piano
- Hal Rugg – steel guitar
- Jerry Shook – guitar
- Jerry Stembridge – acoustic guitar
- Bob Thompson – banjo
- Pete Wade – guitar
- Joe Zinkan – bass

== Charts ==
Album

Chart (1970)	Peak position
US Hot Country LP's (Billboard)	8

Singles

Title	Year	Peak position	
Title	Year	US Country	CAN Country
"I Know How"	1970	4	13
"You Wanna Give Me a Lift"	1970	6	4
