= One's on the Way (album) =

Studio album by Loretta Lynn
- Released: March 6, 1972
- Recorded: November 18, 1968–January 20, 1972
- Studios: Bradley's Barn, Mount Juliet, Tennessee
- Genre: Country
- Length: 26:44
- Label: Decca
- Producer: Owen Bradley

Loretta Lynn chronology
Lead Me On (1972)	One's on the Way (1972)	Alone with You (1972)

Singles from One's on the Way
- 1. "One's on the Way" Released: November 29, 1971

One's on the Way is the nineteenth solo studio album by American country music singer-songwriter Loretta Lynn. It was released on March 6, 1972, by Decca Records.

== Critical reception ==
Professional ratings
Review scores
Source	Rating
AllMusic	3/5 stars
Christgau's Record Guide	B+

In the issue dated April 15, 1972, Billboard published a review that said, "Ms. Lynn's latest LP is an agreeable coupling of some well-known and some not-so-well-known contemporary country material. In her own winning style she offers Ray Griff's "The Morning After Baby Let Me Down"" and Conway Twitty's "I Can't See Me Without You". Programmers should be aware of "L-O-V-E, Love" and "It's Not the Miles I've Traveled". Also included is her recent No. 1 country smash.

Cashbox published a review in the March 18 issue which said, "This one's on the way for Loretta Lynn! Her new album, revolving around her recent hit single, is bound to take off for the top and stay there for quite a while. Her clean and simple style and direct approach to tasteful material has made her a hallmark in C&W circles for the last decade. And she keeps getting better and better. In addition to the title tune, this LP features Ray Griff's "The Morning After Baby Let Me Down" and fine versions of "Blueberry Hill" and "He's All I Got" (popularized by Johnny Paycheck as "She's All I Got")."

== Commercial performance ==
The album peaked at No. 3 on the US Billboard Hot Country LP's chart and No. 109 on the US Billboard Top LP's & Tape chart.

The album's only single, "One's on the Way", was released in November 1971 and topped the US Billboard Hot Country Singles chart. The single also peaked at No. 1 in Canada on the RPM Country Singles chart.

== Recording ==
Recording sessions for the album took place on January 18, 19 and 20, 1972, at Bradley's Barn in Mount Juliet, Tennessee. Two songs on the album were recorded during sessions for previous albums. The title track, "One's on the Way", was recorded on August 3, 1971, during the sessions for 1971's You're Lookin' at Country. "L-O-V-E, Love" was recorded during the November 18, 1968 session for 1969's Your Squaw Is on the Warpath.

== Track listing ==
Side one
No.	Title	Writer(s)	Recording date	Length
1.	"One's on the Way"	Shel Silverstein	August 3, 1971	2:37
2.	"The Morning After Baby Let Me Down"	Ray Griff	January 20, 1972	2:40
3.	"It'll Feel Good When It Quits Hurtin'"	Roni Rivers; Shirley Tackitt	January 20, 1972	2:15
4.	"Blueberry Hill"	Al Lewis; Vincent Rose; Larry Stock	January 18, 1972	2:23
5.	"Love's on the Loose"	Billy Arr	January 18, 1972	1:50
6.	"L-O-V-E, Love"	Loretta Lynn; Maggie Vaughn	November 18, 1968	2:48

Side two
No.	Title	Writer(s)	Recording date	Length
1.	"He's All I Got"	Gary US Bonds; Jerry Williams	January 18, 1972	2:37
2.	"I Can't See Me Without You"	Conway Twitty	January 20, 1972	2:25
3.	"It's Not the Miles You Traveled"	Dave Hall; Louis Redding	January 19, 1972	2:02
4.	"Too Wild to Be Tamed"	Tracey Lee	January 19, 1972	2:15
5.	"I'm Losing My Mind"	Smiley Burnette	January 19, 1972	2:52

== Personnel ==
Adapted from the album liner notes and Decca recording session records.

- Larry Barbier – photography
- Harold Bradley – bass guitar, electric bass guitar
- Owen Bradley – producer
- Floyd Cramer – piano
- Ray Edenton – guitar, acoustic guitar
- Buddy Harman – drums
- Junior Huskey – bass
- Darrell Johnson – mastering
- The Jordanaires – background vocals
- Loretta Lynn – lead vocals
- Grady Martin – guitar, lead electric guitar
- Bob Moore – bass
- Hargus Robbins – piano
- Hal Rugg – steel
- Dave Thornhill – guitar
- Don Willis – liner notes

== Charts ==
Album

Chart (1972)	Peak position
US Hot Country LP's (Billboard)	3
US Top LP's & Tape (Billboard)	109

Singles

Title	Year	Peak position	
Title	Year	US Country	CAN Country
"One's on the Way"	1971	1	1
