= The Other Woman (Loretta Lynn song) =

Single by Loretta Lynn

from the album Loretta Lynn Sings
- B-side: "Who'll Help Me Get Over You"
- Released: March 1963
- Recorded: 9 January 1963
- Studio: Columbia (Nashville, Tennessee)
- Genre: Honky tonk country
- Length: 2:26
- Label: Decca
- Songwriter(s): Betty Sue Perry
- Producer(s): Owen Bradley

Loretta Lynn singles chronology
"World of Forgotten People" (1962)	"The Other Woman" (1963)	"Before I'm Over You" (1963)

"The Other Woman" is a song written by Betty Sue Perry that was originally recorded by American country artist Loretta Lynn. It was released as a single in March 1963 via Decca Records.

== Background and reception ==
"The Other Woman" was recorded at the Columbia Recording Studios on January 9, 1963. Located in Nashville, Tennessee, the session was produced by the studio's original co-founder, renowned country music producer Owen Bradley. Also included on the session was background vocal group The Jordanaires.

"The Other Woman" reached number thirteen on the Billboard Hot Country Singles survey in 1963. The song became her second hit single under the Decca recording label. It was included on her debut studio album in 1963, Loretta Lynn Sings.

== Track listings ==
7" vinyl single

- "The Other Woman" – 2:26
- "Who'll Help Me Get Over You" – 2:45

== Charts ==
=== Weekly charts ===
Chart (1963)	Peak position
US Hot Country Singles (Billboard)	13
