= Before I'm Over You (song) =

Single by Loretta Lynn

from the album Before I'm Over You
- B-side: "Where Were You"
- Released: October 1963
- Recorded: 5 February 1962
- Studio: Bradley Studios, Nashville, Tennessee
- Genre: Honky tonk country
- Length: 2:30
- Label: Decca
- Songwriter(s): Betty Sue Perry
- Producer(s): Owen Bradley

Loretta Lynn singles chronology
"The Other Woman" (1963)	"Before I'm Over You" (1963)	"Wine, Women and Song" (1964)

"Before I'm Over You" is a song written by Betty Sue Perry that was originally recorded by American country artist Loretta Lynn. It was released as a single in October 1963 via Decca Records.

== Background and reception ==
"Before I'm Over You" was recorded at Columbia's Bradley Studios in Nashville, Tennessee on February 5, 1962. The session was produced by the studio's co-founder, renowned country music producer Owen Bradley. It was Lynn's second recording session after signing with Decca Records in 1961.

"Before I'm Over You" reached number four on the Billboard Hot Country Singles survey in 1963. The song became her second top ten single under the Decca recording label. "Before I'm Over You" was Lynn's biggest hit single up until this point in 1963. It was included on her debut studio album in 1964, Before I'm Over You.

== Track listings ==
7" vinyl single

- "Before I'm Over You" – 2:26
- "Where Were You" – 2:29

== Charts ==
=== Weekly charts ===
Chart (1963)	Peak position
US Hot Country Singles (Billboard)	4
