= Naked in the Rain (Loretta Lynn song) =

Single by Loretta Lynn

from the album Loretta
- B-side: "I Should Be Over You by Now"
- Released: June 1980
- Recorded: October 1979
- Studio: Bradley's Barn, Mt. Juliet, Tennessee
- Genre: Country
- Length: 2:39
- Label: MCA
- Songwriters: Buddy Cannon, Kenny Trebbe
- Producer: Owen Bradley

Loretta Lynn singles chronology
"Pregnant Again" (1980)	"Naked in the Rain" (1980)	"Cheatin' on a Cheater" (1980)

"Naked in the Rain" is a song that was originally performed by American country music artist Loretta Lynn. It was released as a single in June 1980 via MCA Records.

== Background and reception ==
"Naked in the Rain" was recorded at Bradley's Barn studio in Mount Juliet, Tennessee in October 1979. The recording session was produced by the studio's owner, renowned country music producer Owen Bradley. Two additional tracks were recorded during this session, including Lynn's next previous single "Pregnant Again".

"Naked in the Rain" reached number thirty on the Billboard Hot Country Singles survey in 1980 Additionally, the song peaked at number eleven on the Canadian RPM Country Songs chart during this same period. It was included on her studio album, Loretta (1980).

== Track listings ==
7" vinyl single

- "Naked in the Rain" – 2:39
- "I Should Be Over You by Now"

== Charts ==
Chart (1980)	Peak position
Canada Country Songs (RPM)	11
US Hot Country Singles (Billboard)	30
