= We've Come a Long Way Baby (song) =

Single by Loretta Lynn

from the album We've Come a Long Way Baby
- B-side: "I Can't Feel You Anymore"
- Released: October 1978
- Recorded: June 29, 1976
- Studio: Bradley's Barn, Mt. Juliet, Tennessee
- Genre: Country
- Length: 2:02
- Label: MCA
- Songwriter(s): Shirl Milete; L. E. White
- Producer(s): Owen Bradley

Loretta Lynn singles chronology
"Spring Fever" (1978)	"We've Come a Long Way Baby" (1978)	"I Can't Feel You Anymore" (1979)

"We've Come a Long Way Baby" is a song written by L. E. White and Shirl Milete that was originally performed by American country music artist Loretta Lynn. It was released as a single in October 1978 via MCA Records.

== Background and reception ==
"We've Come a Long Way Baby" was recorded at Bradley's Barn studio in Mount Juliet, Tennessee on June 29, 1976. The recording session was produced by the studio's owner, renowned country music producer Owen Bradley. Two additional tracks were recorded during this session.

"We've Come a Long Way Baby" reached number ten on the Billboard Hot Country Singles survey in 1970. Additionally, the song peaked at number six on the Canadian RPM Country Songs chart during this same period. It was included on her studio album, We've Come a Long Way Baby (1978).

== Track listings ==
7" vinyl single

- "We've Come a Long Way Baby" – 2:02
- "I Can't Feel You Anymore" – 3:12

== Charts ==
Chart (1978)	Peak position
Canada Country Songs (RPM)	6
US Hot Country Singles (Billboard)	10
