= Woman of the World (Leave My World Alone) =

Single by Loretta Lynn

from the album Woman of the World / To Make a Man
- B-side: "Sneakin' In"
- Released: January 27, 1969
- Recorded: 18 November 1968
- Studio: Bradley's Barn, Mt. Juliet, Tennessee
- Genre: Country
- Length: 2:54
- Label: Decca
- Songwriter: Sharon Higgins
- Producer: Owen Bradley

Loretta Lynn singles chronology
"Your Squaw Is on the Warpath" (1968)	"Woman of the World (Leave My World Alone)" (1969)	"To Make a Man (Feel Like a Man)" (1969)

"Woman of the World (Leave My World Alone)' is a 1969 single written by Sharon Higgins, and recorded by Loretta Lynn. The single was from the LP Woman of the World / To Make a Man and was Loretta Lynn's third number one on the country charts. The single spent one week at the top and a total of 15 weeks on the chart.

== Chart performance ==
Chart (1969)	Peak position
U.S. Billboard Hot Country Singles	1
