= Shadrack, the Black Reindeer =

Single by Loretta Lynn
- B-side: "Let's Put Christ Back in Christmas"
- Released: November 1974
- Recorded: August 29, 1974
- Studio: Bradley's Barn, Mount Juliet, Tennessee
- Genre: Country; Christmas
- Length: 4:09
- Label: MCA
- Songwriter: Zero Jones
- Producer: Owen Bradley

Loretta Lynn singles chronology
"Trouble in Paradise" (1974)	"Shadrack, the Black Reindeer" (1974)	"The Pill" (1975)

"Shadrack, the Black Reindeer" is a song written by Zero Jones. It was notably recorded by American country singer-songwriter Loretta Lynn in 1974. It was released as a single the same year via MCA Records. It was given mixed reviews upon its initial release and did not chart any major music publications.

== Background and content ==
"Shadrack, the Black Reindeer" was composed by singer-songwriter Zero Jones. The song tells the fictional tale of a reindeer named Shadrack who was part of Santa Claus's reindeer pack and was considered "the fastest reindeer." The song was one of several holiday tunes to describe reindeer other than Rudolph the Red-Nosed Reindeer. The song was recorded first by Loretta Lynn at Bradley's Barn on August 29, 1974. The studio was owned by her producer, Owen Bradley. Lynn had been working with Bradley for nearly a decade up to that point on the MCA (formerly Decca) label. Several more songs were recorded during the same studio sessions and accompaniment was provided by The Nashville A-Team of musicians.

== Release and reception ==
"Shadrack, the Black Reindeer" was released as a single in November 1974 via MCA Records. It was issued as a 7-inch single and included a holiday tune on the B-side of the release. The single did not chart on any Billboard charts, including the Hot Country Singles, where most of Lynn's singles appeared. In their December issue, Billboard commented that the song was among a list of holiday tunes delayed for release by Nashville record labels, calling part of the "country holiday product scarce."

The song received mixed reception from critics and writers. Television network, MeTV, included the song on its list of the "strangest batch of Christmas songs," calling the song (among others on the list) "downright goofy." They also called the song "a questionable tale." In 1974, Jet gave the song a positive review, saying that it had "a reasonable chance of becoming a Christmas standard."

== Track listing ==
7-inch vinyl single

- "Shadrack, the Black Reindeer" – 4:09
- "Let's Put Christ Back in Christmas" – 2:29
