= Trouble in Paradise (Loretta Lynn song) =

Single by Loretta Lynn

from the album They Don't Make 'em Like My Daddy
- B-side: "We've Already Tasted Love"
- Released: August 12, 1974
- Recorded: 19 June 1974
- Studio: Bradley's Barn, Mt. Juliet, Tennessee
- Genre: Country
- Label: Decca
- Songwriter(s): Kenny O'Dell
- Producer(s): Owen Bradley

Loretta Lynn singles chronology
"They Don't Make 'em Like My Daddy" (1974)	"Trouble in Paradise" (1974)	"Shadrack, the Black Reindeer" (1974)

"Trouble in Paradise" is 1974 single by Loretta Lynn. "Trouble in Paradise" was Lynn's eighth number one on the U.S country singles chart as a solo artist. The single stayed at number one for a single week and spent a total of thirteen weeks on the chart.

== Chart performance ==
Chart (1974)	Peak position
U.S. Billboard Hot Country Singles	1
Canadian RPM Country Tracks	14
