= Wine, Women and Song (song) =

Single by Loretta Lynn

from the album Before I'm Over You
- B-side: "This Haunted House"
- Released: April 1964
- Recorded: 26 February 1964
- Studio: Columbia (Nashville, Tennessee)
- Genre: Honky tonk country
- Length: 2:02
- Label: Decca
- Songwriter(s): Betty Sue Perry
- Producer(s): Owen Bradley

Loretta Lynn singles chronology
"Before I'm Over You" (1963)	"Wine, Women and Song" (1964)	"Mr. and Mrs. Used to Be" (1964)

"Wine, Women and Song" is a song written by Betty Sue Perry that was originally recorded by American country artist Loretta Lynn. It was released as a single in April 1964 via Decca Records.

== Background and reception ==
"Wine, Women and Song" was recorded at the Columbia Recording Studios in Nashville, Tennessee on February 26, 1964. The session was produced by the studio's co-founder, renowned country music producer Owen Bradley. Three additional tracks were recorded during this session, including the single's B-side, "This Haunted House".

"Wine, Women and Song" reached number three on the Billboard Hot Country Singles survey in 1963. The song became her third top ten single under the Decca recording label. "Wine, Women and Song" was Lynn's biggest hit single up until this point in 1964. It was included on her second studio album, Before I'm Over You (1964).

== Track listings ==
7" vinyl single

- "Wine, Women and Song" – 2:02
- "This Haunted House" – 2:23

== Charts ==
=== Weekly charts ===
Chart (1964)	Peak position
US Hot Country Singles (Billboard)	3
