= Lookin' Good (album) =

Studio album by Loretta Lynn
- Released: October 13, 1980
- Studio: Bradley's Barn, Mt. Juliet, Tennessee
- Genre: Country, urban cowboy
- Label: MCA Records
- Producer: Owen Bradley

Loretta Lynn chronology
Loretta (1980)	Lookin' Good (1980)	Two's a Party (1981)

Singles from Lookin' Good
- 1. "Cheatin' on a Cheater" Released: September 1980; 2. "Somebody Led Me Away" Released: March 1981

Lookin' Good is the thirty-third solo studio album by American country music singer-songwriter Loretta Lynn. It was released on October 13, 1980, by MCA Records.

== Commercial performance ==
The album peaked at No. 17 on the Billboard Top Country Albums chart. The album's first single. "Cheatin' on a Cheater", and second single, "Somebody Led Me Away", both peaked at No. 20 on the Billboard Hot Country Songs chart.

== Track listing ==
Side one
No.	Title	Writer(s)	Length
1.	"Cheatin' on a Cheater"	Johnny Wilson, Woody Bomar	2:29
2.	"Take Your Time in Leavin"	Jerri Kelly	2:28
3.	"Sometimes I Go Crazy"	Vicki Sallen, Gene Dunlap	2:53
4.	"Workin' Man"	Ted Harris	3:02
5.	"I Don't Feel Like Living Today"	Peggy Forman	2:28

Side two
No.	Title	Writer(s)	Length
1.	"Everybody's Lookin' for Somebody New"	James K. C. Ross, Len Chiriacka	2:27
2.	"Cracker Jack Jewelry"	Van Stephenson, Johnny Slate, Danny Morrison	2:34
3.	"What Am I Gonna Do?"	Kim Carnes, Dave Ellingson	2:51
4.	"Until I Met You"	Hank Riddle	3:21
5.	"Somebody Led Me Away"	Lola Jean Dillon	2:37

== Personnel ==
Adapted from album liner notes.

- Harold Bradley – guitar
- Owen Bradley – producer
- David Briggs – piano
- Gene Chrisman – drums
- Johnny Christopher – guitar
- Ray Edenton – guitar
- Sonny Garrish – steel guitar
- Lloyd Green – steel guitar
- Slick Lawson – photography
- Mike Leech – bass
- Kenny Malone – drums
- Grady Martin – guitar
- Charlie McCoy – harmonica
- The Nashville Sounds – backing vocals
- Hargus "Pig" Robbins – piano
- Hal Rugg – steel guitar
- Pete Wade – guitar
- Bobby Wood – piano
- Reggie Young – guitar

== Chart positions ==
Album – Billboard (North America)

Year	Chart	Peak position
1980	Country Albums	17

Singles – Billboard (North America)

Year	Single	Chart	Peak position
1980	"Cheatin' on a Cheater"	Country Singles	20
1981	"Somebody Led Me Away"	Country Singles	20
