= Somebody Led Me Away =

Single by Loretta Lynn

from the album Lookin' Good
- B-side: "Everybody's Lookin' for Somebody New"
- Released: February 1981
- Recorded: April 1980
- Studio: Bradley's Barn, Mt. Juliet, Tennessee
- Genre: Country
- Length: 2:37
- Label: MCA
- Songwriter(s): Lola Jean Dillon
- Producer(s): Owen Bradley

Loretta Lynn singles chronology
"Cheatin' on a Cheater" (1980)	"Somebody Led Me Away" (1981)	"Count on Me" (1981)

"Somebody Led Me Away" is a song written by Lola Jean Dillon that was originally performed by American country music artist Loretta Lynn. It was released as a single in February 1981 via MCA Records.

== Background and reception ==
"Somebody Led Me Away" was recorded at Bradley's Barn studio in Mount Juliet, Tennessee in April 1980. The recording session was produced by the studio's owner, renowned country music producer Owen Bradley. It was the only song recorded during this particular session.

"Somebody Led Me Away" reached number twenty on the Billboard Hot Country Singles survey in 1980. It became Lynn's second single in a row to become a major hit. Additionally, reached a minor position in Canada, peaking at number thirty eight on the Canadian RPM Country Songs chart during this same period. It was included on her studio album, Lookin' Good (1980).

== Track listings ==
7" vinyl single

- "Somebody Led Me Away" – 2:37
- "Everybody's Lookin' for Somebody New" – 2:27

== Charts ==
Chart (1981)	Peak position
Canada Country Songs (RPM)	38
US Hot Country Singles (Billboard)	20
