= To Make a Man (Feel Like a Man) =

Single by Loretta Lynn

from the album Woman of the World / To Make a Man
- B-side: "One Little Reason"
- Released: June 1969
- Recorded: May 28, 1969
- Studio: Bradley's Barn, Mt. Juliet, Tennessee
- Genre: Country
- Length: 2:15
- Label: Decca
- Songwriter(s): Loretta Lynn
- Producer(s): Owen Bradley

Loretta Lynn singles chronology
"Woman of the World (Leave My World Alone)" (1969)	"To Make a Man (Feel Like a Man)" (1969)	"If We Put Our Heads Together" (1969)

"To Make a Man (Feel Like a Man)" is a song written and originally performed by American country music artist Loretta Lynn. It was released as a single in June 1969 via Decca Records.

== Background and reception ==
"To Make a Man (Feel Like a Man)" was recorded at Bradley's Barn in Mount Juliet, Tennessee on May 28, 1969. The recording session was produced by the studio's owner, renowned country music producer Owen Bradley. Two additional tracks were recorded during this session.

"To Man a Man (Feel Like a Man)" reached number three on the Billboard Hot Country Singles survey in 1969. The song became her sixteenth top ten single under the Decca recording label. Additionally, the song peaked at number four on the Canadian RPM Country Songs chart during this same period. It was included on her studio album, Woman of the World / To Make a Man (1969).

== Track listings ==
7" vinyl single

- "To Make a Man (Feel Like a Man)" – 2:15
- "One Little Reason" – 2:47

== Charts ==
=== Weekly charts ===
Chart (1969)	Peak position
Canada Country Songs (RPM)	4
US Hot Country Singles (Billboard)	3
