= I Can't Feel You Anymore =

Single by Loretta Lynn

from the album We've Come a Long Way Baby
- B-side: "True Love Needs to Keep in Touch"
- Released: April 1979
- Recorded: February 3, 1978
- Studio: Bradley's Barn, Mt. Juliet, Tennessee
- Genre: Country
- Length: 3:12
- Label: MCA
- Songwriters: Theresa Beaty; Meredith Stewart
- Producer: Owen Bradley

Loretta Lynn singles chronology
"We've Come a Long Way Baby" (1978)	"I Can't Feel You Anymore" (1979)	"I've Got a Picture of Us on My Mind" (1979)

"I Can't Feel You Anymore" is a song written by Theresa Beaty and Meredith Stewart that was originally performed by American country music artist Loretta Lynn. It was released as a single in April 1979 via MCA Records.

== Background and reception ==
"I Can't Feel You Anymore" was recorded at Bradley's Barn studio in Mount Juliet, Tennessee on February 3, 1978. The session was produced by the studio's owner, renowned country music producer Owen Bradley. Three additional tracks were recorded during this session.

"I Can't Feel You Anymore" reached number three on the Billboard Hot Country Singles survey in 1980. Additionally, the song peaked at number two on the Canadian RPM Country Songs chart during this same period. It was included on her studio album, We've Come a Long Way Baby (1979).

== Track listings ==
7" vinyl single

- "I Can't Feel You Anymore" – 3:12
- "True Love Needs to Keep in Touch" – 2:25

== Charts ==
Chart (1979)	Peak position
Canada Country Songs (RPM)	2
US Hot Country Singles (Billboard)	3
