= Cheatin' on a Cheater =

Single by Loretta Lynn

from the album Lookin' Good
- B-side: "Until I Met You"
- Released: September 1980
- Recorded: September 1980
- Studio: Bradley's Barn, Mt. Juliet, Tennessee
- Genre: Country
- Label: MCA
- Songwriter(s): Wilson Lee Bomar; Johnny A. Wilson
- Producer(s): Owen Bradley

Loretta Lynn singles chronology
"Naked in the Rain" (1980)	"Cheatin' on a Cheater" (1980)	"Somebody Led Me Away" (1981)

"Cheatin' on a Cheater" is a song that was originally performed by American country music artist Loretta Lynn. It was released as a single in September 1980 via MCA Records.

== Background and reception ==
"Cheatin' on a Cheater" was recorded at Bradley's Barn studio in Mount Juliet, Tennessee in September 1980. The recording session was produced by the studio's owner, renowned country music producer Owen Bradley. Two additional tracks were recorded during this session, including the single's B-side "Until I Met You".

"Cheatin' on a Cheater" reached number twenty on the Billboard Hot Country Singles survey in 1980. Additionally, reached a minor position in Canada, peaking at number twenty one on the Canadian RPM Country Songs chart during this same period. It was included on her studio album, Lookin' Good (1980).

== Track listings ==
7" vinyl single

- "Cheatin' on a Cheater"
- "Until I Met You"

== Charts ==
Chart (1980)	Peak position
Canada Country Songs (RPM)	21
US Hot Country Singles (Billboard)	20
