= I've Got a Picture of Us on My Mind =

Single by Loretta Lynn

from the album Loretta
- B-side: "I Don't Feel Like a Movie Tonight"
- Released: September 1979
- Recorded: March 9, 1979
- Studio: Bradley's Barn, Mt. Juliet, Tennessee
- Genre: Country
- Length: 2:45
- Label: MCA
- Songwriter(s): Bobby Harden
- Producer(s): Owen Bradley

Loretta Lynn singles chronology
"I Can't Feel You Anymore" (1979)	"I've Got a Picture of Us on My Mind" (1979)	"Pregnant Again" (1980)

"I've Got a Picture of Us on My Mind" is a song written by Bobby Harden that was originally performed by American country music artist Loretta Lynn. It was released as a single in September 1979 via MCA Records.

== Background and reception ==
"I've Got a Picture of Us on My Mind" was recorded at Bradley's Barn studio in Mount Juliet, Tennessee on March 9, 1979. The session was produced by the studio's owner, renowned country music producer Owen Bradley. Three additional tracks were recorded during this session.

The song reached number five on the Billboard Hot Country Singles survey in December 1979. Additionally, the song peaked at number two on the Canadian RPM Country Songs chart during this same period. It was included on her studio album, Loretta (1979).

== Track listings ==
7" vinyl single

- "I've Got a Picture of Us on My Mind" – 2:45
- "I Don't Feel Like a Movie Tonight" – 2:56

== Charts ==
Chart (1979)	Peak position
Canada Country Songs (RPM)	2
US Hot Country Singles (Billboard)	5
