= World of Forgotten People =

Single by Loretta Lynn

from the album Loretta Lynn Sings
- B-side: "Get Set for a Heartache"
- Released: October 1962
- Recorded: February 5, 1962
- Studio: Columbia, Nashville, Tennessee
- Genre: Country; Nashville Sound
- Length: 2:00
- Label: Decca
- Songwriter(s): Loretta Lynn
- Producer(s): Owen Bradley

Loretta Lynn singles chronology
"Success" (1962)	"World of Forgotten People" (1962)	"The Other Woman" (1963)

"World of Forgotten People" is a song written and originally recorded by American country singer-songwriter Loretta Lynn. It was released as a single in 1962 via Decca Records and was produced by Owen Bradley. It was among Lynn's first single releases in her career and would be the start of a series of single releases during her career.

== Background and content ==
By 1962, Loretta Lynn had two major hits as a recording artist. In 1961, she had signed with Decca Records where she had her first top ten hit, "Success". At Decca, producer Owen Bradley took notice of Lynn as both a singer and a songwriter. With the encouragement of Bradley and The Wilburn Brothers (who also encouraged her career at this time), Lynn began recording more of her own material. This included "World of Forgotten People". Lynn cut the track in her second studio session with Bradley as her producer. It was recorded on February 5, 1962 at the Columbia Studios in Nashville, Tennessee. Lynn also cut two additional sides at the same session: "The Other Woman" and "A Hundred Proof Heartache". "World of Forgotten People" was her only self-penned song recorded at the session. The song was Lynn's second composition to be recorded with Decca. Lynn is accompanied on this recording, as she was on most of her recordings, by the background vocal group The Jordanaires,

== Release ==
"World of Forgotten People" was released as a single in October 1962 via Decca Records. It was issued as a 7" vinyl single and contained a B-side: "Get Set for a Heartache." It was Lynn's third single release with the label and the start of a series of Decca singles during the decade.

Lynn would remain with the Decca label (later renamed MCA) until 1988. Despite its major label release, the song did not reach any charting positions on any Billboard survey, most notably the Hot Country Singles chart, where most of Lynn's singles appeared. The single was issued on Lynn's 1963 studio album, Loretta Lynn Sings, also issued on Decca. The album was also Lynn's debut studio release. The song would later be covered by American country artist Connie Smith twice. It was first released as the third track on Smith's 1967 studio release, Connie in the Country. She later re-recorded the song in 2024 for her album Love, Prison, Wisdom and Heartaches.

== Track listing ==
7" vinyl single

- "World of Forgotten People" – 2:00
- "Get Set for a Heartache" – 2:00
