= You've Just Stepped In (From Stepping Out on Me) =

Single by Loretta Lynn

from the album Your Squaw Is on the Warpath
- B-side: "This Bottle's (Taking the Place of My Man)"
- Released: June 1968
- Recorded: May 9, 1968
- Studio: Bradley's Barn, Mount Juliet, Tennessee
- Genre: Country
- Length: 2:17
- Label: Decca
- Songwriter(s): Don Trowbridge
- Producer(s): Owen Bradley

Loretta Lynn singles chronology
"Fist City" (1968)	"You've Just Stepped In (From Stepping Out on Me)" (1968)	"Your Squaw Is on the Warpath" (1968)

"You've Just Stepped In (From Stepping Out on Me)" is a song written by Don Trowbridge that was recorded by American country music artist Loretta Lynn. It was released as a single in June 1968 via Decca Records.

== Background and reception ==
"You've Just Stepped In (From Stepping Out on Me)" was recorded at Bradley's Barn studio on May 9, 1968. Located in Mount Juliet, Tennessee, the session was produced by the studio's owner, renowned country music producer Owen Bradley. Three additional tracks were recorded during this session.

"You've Just Stepped In" reached number two on the Billboard Hot Country Singles survey in 1968. The song became her eleventh top ten single under the Decca recording label. It was included on her studio album, Your Squaw Is on the Warpath (1968).

== Track listings ==
7" vinyl single

- "You've Just Stepped In (From Stepping Out on Me)" – 2:17
- "(This Bottle's) Taking the Place of My Man" – 2:41

== Charts ==
=== Weekly charts ===
Chart (1968)	Peak position
US Hot Country Singles (Billboard)	2
