= One's on the Way =

Single by Loretta Lynn

from the album One's on the Way
- B-side: "The Morning After Baby Let Me Down"
- Released: November 1971 (U.S.)
- Recorded: 1970
- Genre: Country
- Label: Decca 32900
- Songwriter: Shel Silverstein
- Producer: Owen Bradley

Loretta Lynn singles chronology
| "Lead Me On" (1971) | "One's on the Way" (1971) | "Here I Am Again" (1972) |

"One's on the Way" is a song made famous by country music singer Loretta Lynn. Originally released in 1971, the song was the title track to her 1971 album and became one of her best-known hits. It was written by Shel Silverstein.

== About the song ==
Country music writer Tom Roland described "One's on the Way" as a "humorous piece on motherhood," wherein a housewife in Topeka, Kansas, pregnant with the latest in a family of several children, contemplates her hectic lifestyle and compares her conditions to the glamour-based lives of Debbie Reynolds and Elizabeth Taylor. The song also makes reference to First Lady Jacqueline Kennedy at the White House and sex symbol actress Raquel Welch again in contrast to the housewife vocalist's conventional life.

The song was the latest in a series of what genre historian Bill Malone said was "feisty" songs from Lynn. In effect, "One's on the Way" and similarly themed songs, such as "Don't Come Home A' Drinkin' (With Lovin' on Your Mind)" and "The Pill", helped Lynn become "the spokeswoman for every woman who had gotten married too early, pregnant too often and felt trapped by the tedium and drudgery of her life."

Each of the song's verses has Lynn speaking in awe about the outside world. For instance, in the first verse, she draws comparisons between such things as Taylor flying to France to have her hair done and the joy and gaiety of the social scene in Washington and her own dull life:

Here in Topeka, the rain is a-fallin',
the faucet is a-drippin',
and the kids are a-bawlin'

At one point, she angers her husband after a misunderstanding (he had called from a nearby tavern to announce he was bringing some old Army friends home, just as she was trying to shoo one of her children away from somewhere he wasn't supposed to be). The end of the song includes Lynn sighing, "Gee, I hope it ain't twins again!" (Lynn's last two children had indeed been twins in real life).

On the other hand, the lyrics—considering there is no apparent jealousy in the way in which they are sung in the Loretta Lynn version—can be taken as a sardonic observation on the shallow, pointless existence of the glitterati by one who is living a more common life. At some points in the lyrics the singer mentions the (then new) birth control pill and women's liberation movement, seeming to lament that such changes will soon affect the rest of the country, but may never have a real influence on her life.

Loretta appeared as a guest star in episode 8 of season 3 of The Muppet Show in 1978 and sang this song alongside 5 baby Muppets.

In later years when Lynn performed the song in concert, she frequently substituted references to the now-deceased Jacqueline Kennedy (called simply "Jackie" in the song) with the names of Nancy Reagan or Michelle Obama, who, like Kennedy, served as First Lady of the United States. Despite the March 2011 death of Elizabeth Taylor, Lynn still mentioned 'Liz' in her performances.

== Original pressings ==
When released in November 1971, Decca Records issued the single to record stores and radio stations under the title "Here in Topeka" (in reference to the hook line). Once the mistake was discovered, new singles were issued with the correct title. However, for years, Lynn received requests at concerts to perform "Here in Topeka."

== Chart performance ==
| Chart (1972) | Peak position |
|---|---|
| Australia (Kent Music Report) | 14 |
| U.S. Billboard Hot Country Singles | 1 |
| Canadian RPM Country Tracks | 1 |

== See also ==
- Pregnant Again
