= Success (Loretta Lynn song) =

1962 single by Loretta Lynn

Single by Loretta Lynn

from the album Loretta Lynn Sings
- B-side: "A Hundred Proof Heartache"
- Released: April 1962
- Recorded: September 1961
- Studio: Bradley Studios (Nashville, Tennessee)
- Genre: Country; Nashville Sound
- Length: 2:36
- Label: Decca
- Songwriter: Johnny Mullins
- Producer: Owen Bradley

Loretta Lynn singles chronology
"I Walked Away from the Wreck" (1961)	"Success" (1962)	"World of Forgotten People" (1962)

Professional ratings
"Success" / "A Hundred Proof Heartache"
Review scores
Source	Rating
Billboard	positive

"Success" is a song written by Johnny Mullins that was originally recorded by the American country artist Loretta Lynn. It was released as a single and became a major country hit in 1962. The song was among Lynn's first major hits as a recording artist. In 1992, the Irish singer-songwriter Sinéad O'Connor covered it as "Success Has Made a Failure of Our Home", which became an international hit.

== Loretta Lynn version ==
In 1961, Loretta Lynn signed a recording contract with Decca Records under the production of Owen Bradley. "Success" was among the first songs Lynn had recorded for the record company. Located in Nashville, Tennessee, the session was produced by Owen Bradley. The song was recorded under her first session with Bradley and the recording label. Three other tracks were recorded on the same session. Composed by Johnny Mullins, "Success" was recorded in the honky tonk style of country music, which incorporated more traditional elements of the genre.

"Success" was released as a single via Decca Records in April 1962. The single spent a total of 16 weeks on the Billboard Hot Country Western and Sides chart before peaking at number six in September. Although Lynn's first hit had been 1960's "I'm a Honky Tonk Girl," it was "Success" that became Lynn's first top ten hit in her career. The single ultimately started a series of top ten hits for Lynn during the decade. This would be followed by number one singles as well. In 1963, the song was issued on Lynn's debut studio album entitled Loretta Lynn Sings, also on Decca.

=== Track listings ===
- 7-inch vinyl single
1. "Success" – 2:36
2. "A Hundred Proof Heartache" – 2:25

=== Charts ===
Chart (1962)	Peak position
US Hot Country Songs (Billboard)	6

== Sinéad O'Connor version ==
"Success Has Made a Failure of Our Home"

Single by Sinéad O'Connor

from the album Am I Not Your Girl?
- Released: September 1, 1992
- Studio: National Edison (New York City)
- Length: 4:29
- Label: Ensign; Chrysalis
- Songwriter: Johnny Mullins
- Producers: Phil Ramone; Sinéad O'Connor

Sinéad O'Connor singles chronology
"Three Babies" (1990)	"Success Has Made a Failure of Our Home" (1992)	"Don't Give Up" (1993)

Music video
- "Success Has Made a Failure of Our Home" on YouTube

The Irish singer-songwriter Sinéad O'Connor covered the song as "Success Has Made a Failure of Our Home" in 1992. It was released on September 1, 1992 by Ensign and Chrysalis Records, as the lead single from her third album, Am I Not Your Girl? (1992).

"That's definitely the most biographical song on the album...the one that is the most personal. I didn't see it in terms of being a country song even though Loretta Lynn recorded it...but as a song that expressed something important...how everyone is concerned with material success and what that can do to people. Success has made a failure of our home...my home."

—Sinéad O'Connor talking about the song.

O'Connor first heard the song on an early '60s album by American country artist Loretta Lynn. The cover is produced by O'Connor with Phil Ramone and remains one of her biggest hits after it charted in several countries. The single peaked within the top 20 in Ireland, Italy, the Netherlands and the United Kingdom, top 30 in Belgium and Switzerland, and top 40 in Australia and New Zealand. In the US, the single reached number 20 on the Billboard Alternative Songs chart.

The song was later included on her first compilation album, So Far... The Best Of (1997).

=== Critical reception ===
The song received favorable reviews from music critics. Larry Flick from Billboard magazine commented, "There's a new Sinead coming to town, as she previews her upcoming set of pop standards, Am I Not Your Girl? Interestingly, she delivers one of the most assured, full-voiced performances to date, digging deep into the emotion of the material with a combination of heartfelt emotion and unbridled confidence. Will stun folks at first, though they will eventually become enthralled by the sincerity of this project." Greg Sandow from Entertainment Weekly called it a transformation of a Loretta Lynn song, writing, "Right at the start, a tortured brass riff tears it from its country roots. And at the end O’Connor dissolves it into an all-but-deranged cry of despair, repeating "Am I not your girl?" for a full minute and a half, 27 times in all, with the brass shrieking behind her." Tom Ewing from Freaky Trigger felt the song shows that O'Connor "can belt with the best of them". Lennox Herald described it as a "dramatic ballad with big band sound hit." Liverpool Echo said the song "could have been written for her".

Robert Hilburn from Los Angeles Times wrote, "This is another country song, but O'Connor has redone the old Loretta Lynn hit in big-band fashion, turning it into a commentary on how obsession with material values can destroy a relationship. In the debate over O'Connor's political gestures, it's easy to forget that the Irish singer-songwriter is a gifted artist." A reviewer from Music Week named it "her most bewitching single" since "Nothing Compares 2 U", remarking that it is "expensively produced, with a brilliant orchestral arrangement offsetting her vulnerable small voice beautifully. Bittersweet lyrics and constantly shifting tempo add considerably to what is an inspired choice." Parry Gettelman from Orlando Sentinel felt her "drastic reworking" is "intriguing", adding that "the overwrought arrangement suits O'Connor's tightly wound vocal." People Magazine said in their review of the album, that "the only time O'Connor seems to be anything but childlike" is on the song. Daphne Kwong from Stanford Daily felt "the music overwhelms O'Connor's voice until she starts singing louder midway through the song."

=== Music video ===
A music video was made to accompany the song. In the video, O'Connor performs the song on a press conference about child abuse while cameras are flashing. She imparts lyrics with sign language. Timothy White from Billboard magazine described the video like this, "The singer is depicted on a sleekly nightmarish dais, delivering her clement declaration as if responding to some sinister state inquisition. Her simple lament is soon transmuted into an indictment of the social atrocities of a wayward age, while actual Amnesty International slides of international torture victims are flashed upon the walls behind her."

=== Track listings ===
CD single, Europe (1992)
No.	Title	Length
1.	"Success Has Made a Failure of Our Home"
2.	"You Do Something to Me"
3.	"My Heart Belongs to Daddy"
4.	"Someone to Watch Over Me"

CD single (CD1), US (1992)
No.	Title	Length
1.	"Success Has Made a Failure of Our Home"	4:29
2.	"You Do Something to Me"	2:34
3.	"I Want to Be Loved By You"	2:44

CD single (CD2), UK (1992)
No.	Title	Length
1.	"Success Has Made a Failure of Our Home"	4:29
2.	"My Heart Belongs to Daddy"	2:53
3.	"Someone to Watch Over Me"	3:46

=== Charts ===
Chart (1992)	Peak position
Australia (ARIA)	37
Belgium (Ultratop 50 Flanders)	22
Canada Top Singles (RPM)	62
Europe (Eurochart Hot 100)	35
Ireland (IRMA)	11
Netherlands (Dutch Top 40)	15
Netherlands (Single Top 100)	21
New Zealand (Recorded Music NZ)	32
Switzerland (Schweizer Hitparade)	28
UK Singles (OCC)	18
UK Airplay (Music Week)	36
US Alternative Airplay (Billboard)	20

=== Release history ===
Region	Date	Format(s)	Label(s)	Ref.
United Kingdom	September 1, 1992	—	Ensign	
Australia	September 7, 1992	CD; cassette	Ensign	
Japan	September 16, 1992	Mini-CD	Ensign	
