= I Walked Away from the Wreck =

Single by Loretta Lynn

from the album Loretta Lynn Sings
- B-side: "The Girl That I Am Now"
- Released: November 1961
- Recorded: September 8, 1961
- Studio: Bradley Studios, Nashville, Tennessee
- Genre: Country; Nashville Sound
- Length: 2:36
- Label: Decca
- Songwriter(s): Cindy Walker
- Producer(s): Owen Bradley

Loretta Lynn singles chronology
"The Darkest Day" (1961)	"I Walked Away from the Wreck" (1961)	"Success" (1962)

"I Walked Away from the Wreck" is a song written by Cindy Walker that was first recorded by American country singer-songwriter Loretta Lynn. It was released as a single in 1961 via Decca Records and later appeared on her debut studio album, Loretta Lynn Sings. "I Walked Away from the Wreck" was Lynn's first single with the Decca label and would start a series of major hits until the 1980s.

== Background and content ==
In 1960, Loretta Lynn had her first major hit with the single "I'm a Honky Tonk Girl." Its success helped country duo The Wilburn Brothers take notice of Lynn as a performer and writer. With their help and support, she signed a new recording contract with Decca Records, her first major label. Under Decca, Lynn would be produced by Owen Bradley, who helped find Lynn's very first recordings. Bradley produced "I Walked Away from the Wreck," which was recorded during her very first session at the Decca label. The session took place on September 8, 1961, at the Bradley Studios in Nashville, Tennessee. Other songs were also recorded during this same session, including Lynn's own composition ("The Girl That I Am Now") and her first top ten hit ("Success"). "I Walked Away from the Wreck" was Lynn's first single release to be composed by another writer. Cindy Walker had written the track.

== Release ==
"I Walked Away from the Wreck" was released as a single in November 1961 via Decca Records. It was issued as a 7" single. On its B-side was Lynn's self-penned "The Girl That I Am Now."

"I Walked Away from the Wreck" was Lynn's first single released on the Decca label. Lynn would remain with the label (later renamed MCA) until 1988. Despite its major label release, the song did not reach any charting positions on any Billboard survey, most notably the Hot Country Singles chart, where most of Lynn's singles appeared. The single was issued on Lynn's 1963 studio album, Loretta Lynn Sings, also issued on Decca. The album was also Lynn's debut studio release.

== Track listing ==
7" vinyl single

- "I Walked Away from the Wreck" – 2:36
- "The Girl That I Am Now" – 2:17
