= They Don't Make 'Em Like My Daddy =

Studio album by Loretta Lynn
- Released: September 2, 1974
- Recorded: April 25, 1972–June 20, 1974
- Studios: Bradley's Barn, Mount Juliet, Tennessee
- Genre: Country
- Length: 30:03
- Label: MCA
- Producer: Owen Bradley

Loretta Lynn chronology
Country Partners (1974)	They Don't Make 'Em Like My Daddy (1974)	Back to the Country (1975)

Singles from They Don't Make 'Em Like My Daddy
- 1. "They Don't Make 'Em Like My Daddy" Released: April 8, 1974; 2. "Trouble in Paradise" Released: August 12, 1974

They Don't Make 'em Like My Daddy is the twenty-fourth solo studio album by American country music singer-songwriter Loretta Lynn. It was released on September 2, 1974, by MCA Records.

== Critical reception ==
Professional ratings
Review scores
Source	Rating
AllMusic	3/5 stars

In the September 14 issue, Billboard published a review that said, "When Loretta sings, people listen, and they'll listen to all of these, even though several of the songs have been done before. She has two of her big singles on it and a great deal of new material, out of which will come more singles. The remarkable lady just keeps doing superb songs, and Owen Bradley plays his part." The review also noted "Out of Consideration," "Don't Leave Me Where You Found Me," and "Nothin'" as the best cuts on the album, and a note to record dealers saying that there is "some nostalgia on the back cover, along with great liner notes."

Cashbox also published a review in their September 14 issue which said, "Loretta's bright sparkling vocals have made her one of the most successful females on the country music scene. A sense of boundless happiness is inherent in all her songs, even if they are of the ballad lament type. The lady sings with a refined sense of interpretation that ranks her among the very best of the female country performers. The title track was recently a chart topper. Fine renditions of such country classics as "Behind Closed Doors (Charlie Rich song) ", "If You Love Me (Let Me Know)", "We've Already Tasted Love", "I've Never Been This Far Before", and "I Love". Loretta Lynn is certainly one of the omnipresent reigning queens of country music."

== Commercial performance ==
The album peaked at No. 6 on the US Billboard Hot Country LP's chart.

The first single, "They Don't Make 'Em Like My Daddy", was released in April 1974 and peaked at No. 4 on the US Billboard Hot Country Singles chart. The album's second single, "Trouble in Paradise", was released in August 1974 and peaked at No. 1 on the US Billboard Hot Country Singles chart, Lynn's eleventh No. 1 single.

== Recording ==
Recording sessions for the album began on March 4 and 5, 1974, at Bradley's Barn in Mount Juliet, Tennessee. Three additional sessions followed on June 18, 19 and June 20. Three songs on the album were from previous recording sessions. "They Don't Make 'Em Like My Daddy" was recorded on April 25, 1972, during a session for 1972's Here I Am Again. "Ain't Love a Good Thing" and "Nothin'" were recorded during sessions for 1973's Love Is the Foundation, on March 27 and 28, 1973, respectively.

== Track listing ==
Side one
No.	Title	Writer(s)	Recording date	Length
1.	"They Don't Make 'Em Like My Daddy"	Jerry Chesnut	April 25, 1972	2:18
2.	"Behind Closed Doors"	Kenny O'Dell	March 5, 1974	2:47
3.	"If You Love Me (Let Me Know)"	John Rostill	June 18, 1974	3:13
4.	"I've Never Been This Far Before"	Conway Twitty	March 4, 1974	3:15
5.	"We've Already Tasted Love"	Bobby Harden	June 18, 1974	2:14
6.	"Out of Consideration"	Lorene Allen; James Owen	June 20, 1974	2:58

Side two
No.	Title	Writer(s)	Recording date	Length
1.	"Trouble in Paradise"	Kenny O'Dell	June 19, 1974	2:10
2.	"I Love"	Tom T. Hall	March 4, 1974	2:04
3.	"Don't Leave Me Where You Found Me"	Don Choate	June 19, 1974	2:49
4.	"Ain't Love a Good Thing"	Dallas Frazier	March 27, 1973	2:38
5.	"Nothin'"	Jimmy Peppers	March 28, 1973	2:37

== Personnel ==
Adapted from the album liner notes and MCA recording session records.

- Willie Ackerman – drums
- Harold Bradley – bass guitar
- Owen Bradley – producer
- Pete Drake – steel guitar
- Ray Edenton – acoustic guitar, electric guitar
- Bud Gray – photography
- Lloyd Green – steel guitar
- Buddy Harman – drums
- Darrell Johnson – mastering
- The Jordanaires – background vocals
- Jerry Kennedy – guitar, dobro
- Billy Linneman – bass
- Loretta Lynn – lead vocals
- Grady Martin – guitar
- Charlie McCoy – harmonica, vibes
- Bob Moore – bass
- Hargus Robbins – piano
- Hal Rugg – steel guitar
- George Vecsey – liner notes
- Pete Wade – guitar
- Jim Williamson – engineer

== Charts ==
Album

Chart (1974)	Peak position
US Hot Country LP's (Billboard)	6

Singles

Title	Year	Peak position	
Title	Year	US Country	CAN Country
"They Don't Make 'Em Like My Daddy"	1974	4	1
"Trouble in Paradise"	1974	1	14
