= Woman of the World/To Make a Man =

Studio album by Loretta Lynn
- Released: July 7, 1969
- Recorded: November 18, 1968–May 28, 1969
- Studios: Bradley's Barn, Mount Juliet, Tennessee
- Genre: Country
- Length: 29:12
- Label: Decca
- Producer: Owen Bradley

Loretta Lynn chronology
| If We Put Our Heads Together (1969) | Woman of the World/To Make a Man (1969) | Wings Upon Your Horns (1970) |

Singles from Woman of the World/To Make a Man
- 1. "Woman of the World (Leave My World Alone)" Released: February 3, 1969; 2. "To Make a Man (Feel Like a Man)" Released: June 30, 1969

Woman of the World/To Make a Man is the fourteenth solo studio album by American country music singer-songwriter Loretta Lynn. It was released on July 7, 1969, by Decca Records.

The album includes a cover of "Stand by Your Man", originally by Tammy Wynette, who was Lynn's biggest rival at the time. Lynn also recorded other covers for the album, including Merle Haggard's "Today I Started Loving You Again" and Brenda Lee's "Johnny One Time".

== Critical reception ==
Professional ratings
Review scores
| Source | Rating |
|---|---|
| Allmusic | 3/5 stars |

Billboard published a review of the album in the issue dated July 19, 1969, which said, "Loretta Lynn has no peers when it comes to convincing with a song; the unique substance of her voice tingles in your mind long after the last note. And when she sings her hit "Woman of the World", watch out—it's pure power. Her big single, "To Make a Man" is here too. And her versions of "Johnny One Note" and "No One Will Ever Know" are emotion-packed nerve jarrers."

In the July 19 issue, Cashbox published a review that said, "Loretta Lynn's recent country chart topper lends its title to a set packed with feelingful vocals and some mighty pretty ballads. Strong sales inevitable on session that includes "Johnny One Time", "No One Will Ever Know", "Today I Started Loving You Again", "Stand by Your Man" and "I'm Lonesome for Trouble Tonight". To be watched closely."

AllMusic gave the album an average rating, saying, "a couple of misfire tracks keep this from being the best of this country singing queen's many fine albums for this label." The website gave the album three out of five stars.

== Commercial performance ==
The album peaked at No. 2 on the US Billboard Hot Country LP's chart and at No. 148 on the US Billboard Top LP's chart.

The lead single, "Woman of the World (Leave My World Alone)", was released in February 1969 and peaked at No. 1 on the US Billboard Hot Country Singles. The second single, "To Make a Man (Feel Like a Man)", was released in June 1969 and peaked at No. 3.

== Recording ==
Recording sessions for the album took place over four sessions at Bradley's Barn in Mount Juliet, Tennessee, beginning on April 2, 1969. Three additional sessions followed on April 9 (yielding six of the album's eleven songs), May 14 and May 28. "Woman of the World (Leave My World Alone)" was recorded during the November 18, 1968 session for 1969's Your Squaw Is on the Warpath.

== Track listing ==
Side one
| No. | Title | Writer(s) | Recording date | Length |
|---|---|---|---|---|
| 1. | "Woman of the World (Leave My World Alone)" | Sharon Higgins | November 18, 1968 | 2:54 |
| 2. | "Johnny One Time" | Dallas Frazier; A.L. Owens | April 9, 1969 | 2:45 |
| 3. | "If You Were Mine to Lose" | Mickey Jaco | April 9, 1969 | 2:50 |
| 4. | "The Only Time I Hurt" | Loretta Lynn | April 9, 1969 | 2:44 |
| 5. | "No One Will Ever Know" | Mel Foree; Fred Rose | April 9, 1969 | 2:35 |
| 6. | "Big Sister, Little Sister" | Frances Heighton; Lynn | April 9, 1969 | 2:40 |

Side two
| No. | Title | Writer(s) | Recording date | Length |
|---|---|---|---|---|
| 1. | "To Make a Man (Feel Like a Man)" | Lynn | May 28, 1969 | 2:15 |
| 2. | "Today I Started Loving You Again" | Merle Haggard; Bonnie Owens | April 2, 1969 | 2:17 |
| 3. | "Stand by Your Man" | Billy Sherrill; Tammy Wynette | April 2, 1969 | 2:51 |
| 4. | "One Little Reason" | Lynn | May 14, 1969 | 2:47 |
| 5. | "I'm Lonesome for Trouble Tonight" | Lynn; Doyle Wilburn | April 9, 1969 | 2:34 |

== Personnel ==
Adapted from the album liner notes and Decca recording session records.

- Willie Ackerman – drums
- Harold Bradley – electric bass guitar
- Owen Bradley – producer
- Larry Butler – piano
- Floyd Cramer – piano
- Ray Edenton – guitar, acoustic guitar
- Lloyd Green – steel guitar
- Buddy Harman – drums
- Junior Huskey – bass
- The Jordanaires – background vocals
- Bruce Lehrke – liner notes
- Loretta Lynn – lead vocals
- Grady Martin – guitar, lead electric guitar
- Hargus Robbins – piano
- Hal Rugg – steel guitar
- Jerry Shook – guitar
- Pete Wade – guitar
- James Wilkerson – vibes

== Charts ==
Album

| Chart (1969) | Peak position |
|---|---|
| US Hot Country LP's (Billboard) | 2 |
| US Top LP's (Billboard) | 148 |

Singles

| Title | Year | Peak position | |
| Title | Year | US Country | CAN Country |
|---|---|---|---|
| "Woman of the World (Leave My World Alone)" | 1969 | 1 | — |
| "To Make a Man (Feel Like a Man)" | 1969 | 3 | 4 |
