= They Don't Make 'em Like My Daddy (song) =

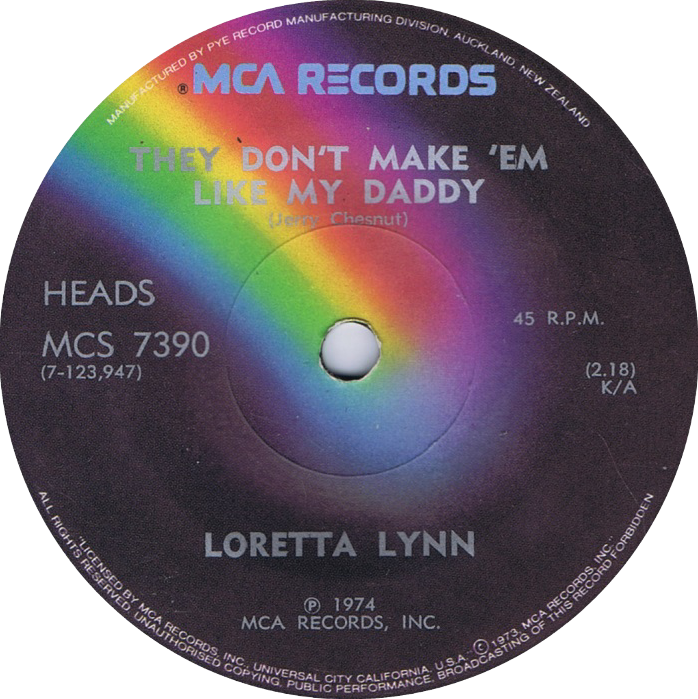
- "They Don't Make 'em Like My Daddy" by Loretta Lynn; A-side label of the New Zealand single release

Single by Loretta Lynn

from the album They Don't Make 'em Like My Daddy
- B-side: "Nothin'"
- Released: April 1974
- Recorded: 25 April 1972
- Studio: Bradley's Barn, Mt. Juliet, Tennessee
- Genre: Country
- Label: MCA
- Songwriter(s): Jerry Chesnut
- Producer(s): Owen Bradley

Loretta Lynn singles chronology
"Hey Loretta" (1973)	"They Don't Make 'em Like My Daddy" (1974)	"Trouble in Paradise" (1974)

"They Don't Make 'em Like My Daddy" is a single by American country music artist Loretta Lynn. Released in April 1974, it was the first single from her album They Don't Make 'em Like My Daddy. The song peaked at number 4 on the Billboard Hot Country Singles chart. It also reached number 1 on the RPM Country Tracks chart in Canada.

== Chart performance ==
Chart (1974)	Peak position
U.S. Billboard Hot Country Singles	4
Canadian RPM Country Tracks	1
