= You Wanna Give Me a Lift =

Single by Loretta Lynn

from the album Loretta Lynn Writes 'Em & Sings 'Em
- B-side: "What's the Bottle Done with My Baby"
- Released: May 1970
- Recorded: October 1, 1969
- Studio: Bradley's Barn, Mt. Juliet, Tennessee
- Genre: Country
- Length: 2:33
- Label: Decca
- Songwriter(s): Loretta Lynn; Peggy Sue Wells
- Producer(s): Owen Bradley

Loretta Lynn singles chronology
"I Know How" (1969)	"You Wanna Give Me a Lift" (1970)	"Coal Miner's Daughter" (1970)

"You Wanna Give Me a Lift" is a song co-written by American country music artist Loretta Lynn and her sister Peggy Sue Wells. It was originally recorded and made popular by Loretta Lynn. It was released as a single in May 1970 via Decca Records.

== Background and reception ==
"You Wanna Give Me a Lift" was recorded at Bradley's Barn studio in Mount Juliet, Tennessee on October 1, 1969. The recording session was produced by the studio's owner, renowned country music producer Owen Bradley. Two additional tracks were recorded during this session including Lynn's signature hit song "Coal Miner's Daughter".

"You Wanna Give Me a Lift" reached number six on the Billboard Hot Country Singles survey in 1970. The song became her eighteenth top ten single on the country chart. Additionally, the song peaked at number four on the Canadian RPM Country Songs chart during this same period. It was included on her studio album, Loretta Lynn Writes 'Em & Sings 'Em (1970).

== Track listings ==
7" vinyl single

- "You Wanna Give Me a Lift"
- "What's the Bottle Done with My Baby"

== Charts ==
=== Weekly charts ===
Chart (1970)	Peak position
Canada Country Songs (RPM)	4
US Hot Country Singles (Billboard)	6
