= I Know How =

Single by Loretta Lynn

from the album Loretta Lynn Writes 'Em & Sings 'Em
- B-side: "Journey to the End of My World"
- Released: February 1970
- Recorded: 23 December 1969
- Studio: Bradley's Barn, Mount Juliet, Tennessee
- Genre: Country
- Length: 2:31
- Label: Decca
- Songwriter(s): Loretta Lynn
- Producer(s): Owen Bradley

Loretta Lynn singles chronology
"Wings Upon Your Horns" (1969)	"I Know How" (1970)	"You Wanna Give Me a Lift" (1970)

"I Know How" is a song written and originally performed by American country music artist Loretta Lynn. It was released as a single in February 1970 via Decca Records.

== Background and reception ==
"I Know How" was recorded at the Bradley's Barn in Mount Juliet, Tennessee on December 23, 1969. The session was produced by the studio's owner, renowned country music producer Owen Bradley. Two additional tracks were recorded during this session.

"I Know How" reached number four on the Billboard Hot Country Singles survey in 1970. The song became her seventeenth top ten single on the country chart. Additionally, the song peaked at number thirteen on the Canadian RPM Country Songs chart during this same period. It was included on her studio album, Loretta Lynn Writes 'Em & Sings 'Em (1970).

== Track listings ==
7" vinyl single

- "I Know How" – 2:31
- "Journey to the End of My World" – 2:30

== Charts ==
=== Weekly charts ===
Chart (1970)	Peak position
Canada Country Songs (RPM)	13
US Hot Country Singles (Billboard)	4
