= Your Squaw Is on the Warpath (song) =

Single by Loretta Lynn

from the album Your Squaw Is on the Warpath
- B-side: "Let Me Go, You're Hurtin' Me"
- Released: October 1968
- Recorded: 30 August 1968
- Studio: Bradley's Barn, Mount Juliet, Tennessee
- Genre: Country
- Length: 2:02
- Label: Decca
- Songwriter: Loretta Lynn
- Producer: Owen Bradley

Loretta Lynn singles chronology
| "You've Just Stepped In (From Stepping Out on Me)" (1968) | "Your Squaw Is on the Warpath" (1968) | "Woman of the World (Leave My World Alone)" (1969) |

"Your Squaw Is on the Warpath" is a song written and originally performed by American country music artist Loretta Lynn. It was released as a single in October 1968 via Decca Records.

== Background and reception ==
"Your Squaw Is on the Warpath" was recorded at Bradley's Barn studio on August 30, 1968. Located in Mount Juliet, Tennessee, the session was produced by the studio's owner, renowned country music producer Owen Bradley. Two additional tracks were recorded during this session.

"Your Squaw Is on the Warpath" reached number three on the Billboard Hot Country Singles survey in early 1969. The song became her thirteenth top ten single under the Decca recording label. Additionally, the song peaked at number seventeen on the Canadian RPM Country Songs chart during this same period. It was included on her studio album of the same name (1968).

== Track listings ==
7" vinyl single

- "Your Squaw Is on the Warpath" – 2:02
- "Let Me Go, You're Hurtin' Me" – 2:35

== Charts ==
=== Weekly charts ===
| Chart (1968–1969) | Peak position |
|---|---|
| Canada Country Songs (RPM) | 17 |
| US Hot Country Singles (Billboard) | 3 |
