= Love Is the Foundation (song) =

Single by Loretta Lynn

from the album Love Is the Foundation
- B-side: "What Sundown Does to You"
- Released: April 23, 1973
- Genre: Country
- Label: MCA
- Songwriter(s): William Cody Hall
- Producer(s): Owen Bradley

Loretta Lynn singles chronology
"Rated "X"" (1972)	"Love Is the Foundation" (1973)	"Hey Loretta" (1973)

"Love Is the Foundation" is the title track from the 1973 album by Loretta Lynn. "Love Is the Foundation", written by William Cody Hall, was Lynn's seventh number one on the U.S. country singles chart as a solo artist. The single stayed at number one for two weeks and spent a total of thirteen weeks on the chart.

== Chart performance ==
Chart (1973)	Peak position
U.S. Billboard Hot Country Singles	1
U.S. Billboard Bubbling Under Hot 100	2
Canadian RPM Country Tracks	1
