= Pregnant Again =

Single by Loretta Lynn

from the album Loretta
- B-side: "You're a Cross I Can't Bear"
- Released: January 1980
- Recorded: October 1979
- Studio: Bradley's Barn, Mt. Juliet, Tennessee
- Genre: Country
- Length: 3:35
- Label: MCA
- Songwriter(s): Lee Pockriss; Mark Sameth
- Producer(s): Owen Bradley

Loretta Lynn singles chronology
"I've Got a Picture of Us on My Mind" (1979)	"Pregnant Again" (1980)	"Naked in the Rain" (1980)

"Pregnant Again" is a song written by Lee Pockriss and Mark Sameth that was originally performed by American country music artist Loretta Lynn. It was released as a single in January 1980 via MCA Records.

== Background and reception ==
"Pregnant Again" was recorded at Bradley's Barn studio in Mount Juliet, Tennessee in October 1979. The recording session was produced by the studio's owner, renowned country music producer Owen Bradley. Two additional tracks were recorded during this session, including Lynn's next single "Naked in the Rain".

"Pregnant Again" reached number thirty on the Billboard Hot Country Singles survey in 1980, becoming her first single to miss the top-twenty in many years. Additionally, the song peaked at number thirteen on the Canadian RPM Country Songs chart during this same period. It was included on her studio album, Loretta (1979).

== Track listings ==
7" vinyl single

- "Pregnant Again" – 3:35
- "You're a Cross I Can't Bear"

== Charts ==
Chart (1980)	Peak position
Canada Country Songs (RPM)	13
US Hot Country Singles (Billboard)	30
