= Hey Loretta =

Single by Loretta Lynn

from the album Love Is the Foundation
- B-side: "Turn Me Anyway but Loose"
- Released: October 1973
- Genre: Country
- Length: 2:48
- Label: MCA
- Songwriter(s): Shel Silverstein
- Producer(s): Owen Bradley

Loretta Lynn singles chronology
"Love Is the Foundation" (1973)	"Hey Loretta" (1973)	"They Don't Make 'em Like My Daddy" (1974)

"Hey Loretta" is a single by American country music artist Loretta Lynn. Released in October 1973, it was the second single from her album Love Is the Foundation. The song peaked at number 3 on the Billboard Hot Country Singles chart. It also reached number 1 on the RPM Country Tracks chart in Canada.

== Chart performance ==
Chart (1973–1974)	Peak position
U.S. Billboard Hot Country Singles	3
Canadian RPM Country Tracks	1
