= Johnny Mullins (songwriter) =

American country music songwriter

Image of Johnny Mullins

Johnny Mullins (October 23, 1923, in Barry County, Missouri – September 16, 2009, in Springfield, Missouri) was an American country music songwriter. His earliest success was with a song called "Company's Comin'", which was recorded by Porter Wagoner in 1954. He is most noted for "Blue Kentucky Girl", originally recorded by Loretta Lynn and later by Emmylou Harris, in whose version it was nominated for a Grammy Award for Best Country Song in 1980. His song "Success" was also recorded by Loretta Lynn and later by Elvis Costello, and also by Sinéad O'Connor under the title, "Success Has Made a Failure of Our Home".

Mullins is interviewed and plays short samples from some of his songs in the PBS video, Johnny Mullins: Ozarks Songwriter. While writing songs in his spare time, he kept his day job as a school janitor in Springfield, Missouri, which he held from 1957 until his retirement in 1982. Mullins was inducted into "Missouri Writers Hall of Fame" in 2001.
