= Love Is the Foundation =

Studio album by Loretta Lynn
- Released: August 13, 1973
- Recorded: December 8, 1969–May 31, 1973
- Studios: Bradley's Barn, Mount Juliet, Tennessee
- Genre: Country
- Length: 27:58
- Label: MCA
- Producer: Owen Bradley

Loretta Lynn chronology
Louisiana Woman, Mississippi Man (1973)	Love Is the Foundation (1973)	Loretta Lynn's Greatest Hits Vol. II (1974)

Singles from Love Is the Foundation
- 1. "Love Is the Foundation" Released: April 23, 1973; 2. "Hey Loretta" Released: October 22, 1973

Love Is the Foundation is the twenty-third solo studio album by American country music singer-songwriter Loretta Lynn. It was released on August 13, 1973, by MCA Records.

== Critical reception ==
Professional ratings
Review scores
Source	Rating
AllMusic	2.5/5 stars

In the August 25, 1973 issue, Billboard published a review that said, "For the never-ending stream of Loretta Lynn fans, here's another fine album to add to her never-ending string of good ones. Good variety of material and lots of Loretta." The review also noted "What Sundown Does to You", "Hey Loretta", and "You're Still Lovin' Me" as the best cuts on the album.

Cashbox also published a review in their August 25 issue which said, "This is the sort of album you put on the turntable and walk away. It plays itself. It's instant programming. "What Sundown Does to You", is a heavy mover. "Satin Sheets" is a case where Loretta's vocals reach down your throat and pull your heart, twist it, and wring it out. Whew! She does Kristofferson's "Why Me", and Shel Silverstein's "Hey Loretta", and "Five Fingers Left", which she wrote herself and which is a very strong personal statement. Loretta is a strong lady, with a strong voice, but her smile strikes deep into your heart. This LP captures all of that."

== Commercial performance ==
The album peaked at No. 1 on the US Billboard Hot Country LP's chart and No. 183 on the US Billboard Top LP's & Tape chart.

The album's first single, "Love Is the Foundation", was released in April 1973 and peaked at No. 1 on the US Billboard Hot Country Singles chart. It also peaked at No. 1 on the RPM Country Singles chart in Canada. The second single, "Hey Loretta", was released in October 1973 and peaked at No. 3 on the US Billboard Hot Country Singles chart and No. 1 on the RPM Country Singles chart in Canada.

== Recording ==
Recording sessions for the album took place at Bradley's Barn in Mount Juliet, Tennessee, on March 5, 27 and 28, 1973. One additional session followed on May 31. "Five Fingers Left" was recorded on December 8, 1969, during a session for 1970's Loretta Lynn Writes 'Em and Sings 'Em.

== Track listing ==
Side one
No.	Title	Writer(s)	Recording date	Length
1.	"Love Is the Foundation"	William Cody Hall	March 5, 1973	2:26
2.	"What Sundown Does to You"	Carl Knight	March 27, 1973	2:12
3.	"I Love You, I Love You"	Don Gibson	March 5, 1973	2:38
4.	"Just to Satisfy (The Weakness in a Man)"	Carol Jones	May 31, 1973	2:37
5.	"There's More to Leaving Than Just Saying Goodbye"	Bob Hampton; Kenny Starr	March 28, 1973	2:31
6.	"Satin Sheets"	John E. Volinkaty	May 31, 1973	2:29

Side one
No.	Title	Writer(s)	Recording date	Length
1.	"Why Me"	Kris Kristofferson	May 31, 1973	2:35
2.	"Five Fingers Left"	Loretta Lynn	December 8, 1969	2:09
3.	"I Gave Everything (That a Girl in Love Should Never Give)"	Marty Robbins	May 31, 1973	2:49
4.	"Hey Loretta"	Shel Silverstein	March 27, 1973	2:48
5.	"You're Still Lovin' Me"	Jay Lee Webb; John Wilson	May 31, 1973	2:44

== Personnel ==
Adapted from the album liner notes and Decca recording session records.

- Willie Ackerman – drums
- Harold Bradley – bass guitar
- Owen Bradley – producer
- Ray Edenton – electric guitar
- Lawrence Fried – photography
- Lloyd Green – steel guitar
- Buddy Harman – drums
- Darrell Johnson - mastering
- The Jordanaires – background vocals
- Jerry Kennedy – guitar
- Billy Linneman – bass
- Loretta Lynn – lead vocals
- Grady Martin – guitar
- Charlie McCoy – harmonica, vibes
- Bob Moore – bass
- Hargus Robbins – piano
- Hal Rugg – steel
- Jerry Shook – guitar
- Kenny Starr – liner notes
- Pete Wade – guitar

== Charts ==
=== Weekly charts ===
Chart (1973)	Peak position
US Billboard 200	183
US Top Country Albums (Billboard)	1

=== Year-end charts ===
Chart (1973)	Position
US Top Country Albums (Billboard)	50
Chart (1974)	Position
US Top Country Albums (Billboard)	26

Singles

Title	Year	Peak position	
Title	Year	US Country	CAN Country
"Love Is the Foundation"	1973	1	1
"Hey Loretta"	1973	3	1
