= The Wilburn Brothers =

American country music duo

- Teddy (left) and Doyle Wilburn in 1954

Background information
- Origin: Hardy, Arkansas, U.S.
- Genres: Country
- Years active: 1954–1982
- Label: Decca
- Past members: Doyle Wilburn; Teddy Wilburn

The Wilburn Brothers were an American country music duo from the 1950s to the 1970s, consisting of brothers Virgil Doyle Wilburn (1930–1982) and Thurman Theodore "Teddy" Wilburn (1931–2003).

== Biography ==
The brothers were born in Hardy, Arkansas. They first attracted attention as child performers, beginning in 1937, in an act called the Wilburn Children; Roy Acuff discovered them and brought them to the Grand Ole Opry in 1940. Due to federal child labor laws, the Wilburns were forced to leave the Opry after six months.

After growing up, they continued to travel and were regulars on the similar Louisiana Hayride program in Shreveport from 1948 until 1951. After the family act disbanded, and the brothers served stints in the US Army during the Korean War, they continued in 1953 as the Wilburn Brothers touring with Faron Young and Webb Pierce. They signed with Decca Records in May 1954, and had their first hit record the same year, backing Webb Pierce, on "Sparkling Brown Eyes." Their other notable hits include "Go Away With Me" (1956), "Which One Is To Blame" (1959), "Trouble's Back In Town" (1962), "It's Another World" (1965), and "Hurt Her Once for Me" (1967).

In 1956, the Wilburns were offered the chance to record "Heartbreak Hotel" before Elvis Presley. After hearing the song, they decided against recording it, describing it as "strange and almost morbid".

In addition to being successful artists, the Wilburns formed the Sure-Fire Music Publishing Company (with Don Helms) in 1957, as well as the Wil-Helm Talent Agency in the early 1960s. They were instrumental in launching the careers of many country musicians, most notably Loretta Lynn, whom they signed to their music publishing company. Lynn was the "girl singer" of the Wilburns' touring show between 1960 and 1968, and she made weekly appearances on their syndicated television show from 1963 to 1971. They also helped develop the career of Patty Loveless between 1973 and 1975, by having her tour with them on weekends and during school breaks.

The Wilburn Brothers had a syndicated television program, The Wilburn Brothers Show, that ran from 1963 to 1974, with 354 half-hour episodes produced. Reruns can still be seen on the cable network RFD-TV and in the UK on Rural TV. They were Opry members from 1953 until the time of Doyle's death from lung cancer on October 16, 1982 (at age 52). Teddy continued with the Opry as a solo artist, until his death on November 24, 2003, of congestive heart failure, just six days before his 72nd birthday.

They are buried beside each other at the Nashville National Cemetery in Nashville, Tennessee.

== Discography ==
=== Albums ===
Year	Album	Chart Positions		Label
Year	Album	US Country	US	Label
1957	Wilburn Brothers			Decca
1958	Side by Side			Decca
1959	Livin' in God's Country			Decca
1960	The Big Heartbreak			Decca
1961	The Wilburn Brothers Sing			Decca
1961	City Limits			Decca
1962	Folk Songs			Decca
1963	Trouble's Back in Town			Decca
1964	Take Up Thy Cross			Decca
1964	Never Alone			Decca
1965	Country Gold			Decca
1965	I'm Gonna Tie One On Tonight			Decca
1966	The Wilburn Brothers Show	25		Decca
1966	Let's Go Country	10		Decca
1967	Two for the Show	7		Decca
1967	Cool Country	11		Decca
1968	It's Another World	23		Decca
1968	Greatest Hits			Decca
1969	We Need a Lot More Happiness			Decca
1969	It Looks Like the Sun's Gonna Shine			Decca
1970	Little Johnny from Down the Street	31	143	Decca
1970	Sing Your Heart Out Country Boy			Decca
1971	That She's Leaving Feeling			Decca
1973	Portrait			MCA
1977	The Wilburn Brothers Sing Hinson and Gaither			Calvary
1981	Stars of the Grand Ole Opry			1st Gen

=== Singles ===
Year	Single	Chart Positions		Album
Year	Single	US Country	US	Album
1954	"Sparkling Brown Eyes" (w/ Webb Pierce)	4		singles only
1954	"Really Love Me"			singles only
1954	"Let Me Be the First to Know"			singles only
1955	"I Wanna Wanna Wanna"	13		singles only
1955	"Mixed Up Medley"			singles only
1956	"You're Not Play Love"	13		singles only
1956	"I'm So in Love with You"	10		singles only
1956	"Go Away with Me"	6		singles only
1957	"Nothing at All"			singles only
1957	"Mister Love" (w/ Ernest Tubb)	8		singles only
1957	"I Got Over the Blues"			singles only
1958	"My Baby Ain't My Baby No More"			singles only
1958	"Hey, Mr. Bluebird" (w/ Ernest Tubb)	9		singles only
1958	"Till I'm the Only One"			singles only
1959	"Which One Is to Blame"	4		singles only
1959	"The Knoxville Girl"	18		singles only
1959	"Somebody's Back in Town"	6		singles only
1959	"A Woman's Intuition"	9		singles only
1960	"Sentenced to Die"			singles only
1960	"Big Heartbreak"			The Big Heartbreak
1960	"The Best of All My Heartaches"	27		singles only
1961	"Legend of the Big River Train"			singles only
1961	"Blue Blue Day"	14		The Wilburn Brothers Sing
1961	"Tag Along"			single only
1962	"Trouble's Back in Town"	4	101	Trouble's Back in Town
1962	"The Sound of Your Footsteps"	21		Trouble's Back in Town
1963	"Roll Muddy River"	4		Never Alone
1963	"Tell Her So"	10		single only
1964	"Hangin' Around"	34		Never Alone
1964	"Impossible"			single only
1964	"I'm Gonna Tie One On Tonight"	19		I'm Gonna Tie One On Tonight
1965	"I Had One Too Many"	30		I'm Gonna Tie One On Tonight
1965	"It's Another World"	5		The Wilburn Brothers Show
1966	"Someone Before Me"	8		Let's Go Country
1966	"I Can't Keep Away from You"	13		Two for the Show
1966	"Hurt Her Once for Me"	3		Two for the Show
1967	"Just to Be Where You Are"	70		Two for the Show
1967	"Roarin' Again"	13		It's Another World
1967	"Goody, Goody Gumdrop"	24		Cool Country
1968	"I'm Leavin'"			Two for the Show
1968	"She'll Walk All Over You"			It's Another World
1968	"We Need a Lot More Happiness"	43		We Need a Lot More Happiness
1969	"It Looks Like the Sun's Gonna Shine"	38		We Need a Lot More Happiness
1969	"Who Could Ask for More"			We Need a Lot More Happiness
1969	"Tag Along"			single only
1970	"Little Johnny from Down the Street"	37		Little Johnny from Down the Street
1970	"Lilacs in Winter"			Little Johnny from Down the Street
1970	"I've Gotta Hang My Hat Upon the Wind"			That She's Leaving Feeling
1971	"That She's Leaving Feeling"			That She's Leaving Feeling
1971	"Bloomin' Fools"			That She's Leaving Feeling
1972	"Arkansas"	47		Portrait
1972	"Opryland"			single only
1972	"City's Goin' Country"			Portrait
1973	"Simon Crutchfield's Grave"			Portrait
1974	"You've Still Got a Place in My Heart"			singles only
1975	"Milwaukee You're in Trouble"			singles only
1976	"Country Kind of Feeling"			singles only
1978	"Mama's Shoe Box"			singles only
1981	"I Know a Goodbye When I See One"			Stars of the Grand Ole Opry
