= Loretta Lynn albums discography =

Album discography of American singer-songwriter Loretta Lynn

Loretta Lynn discography
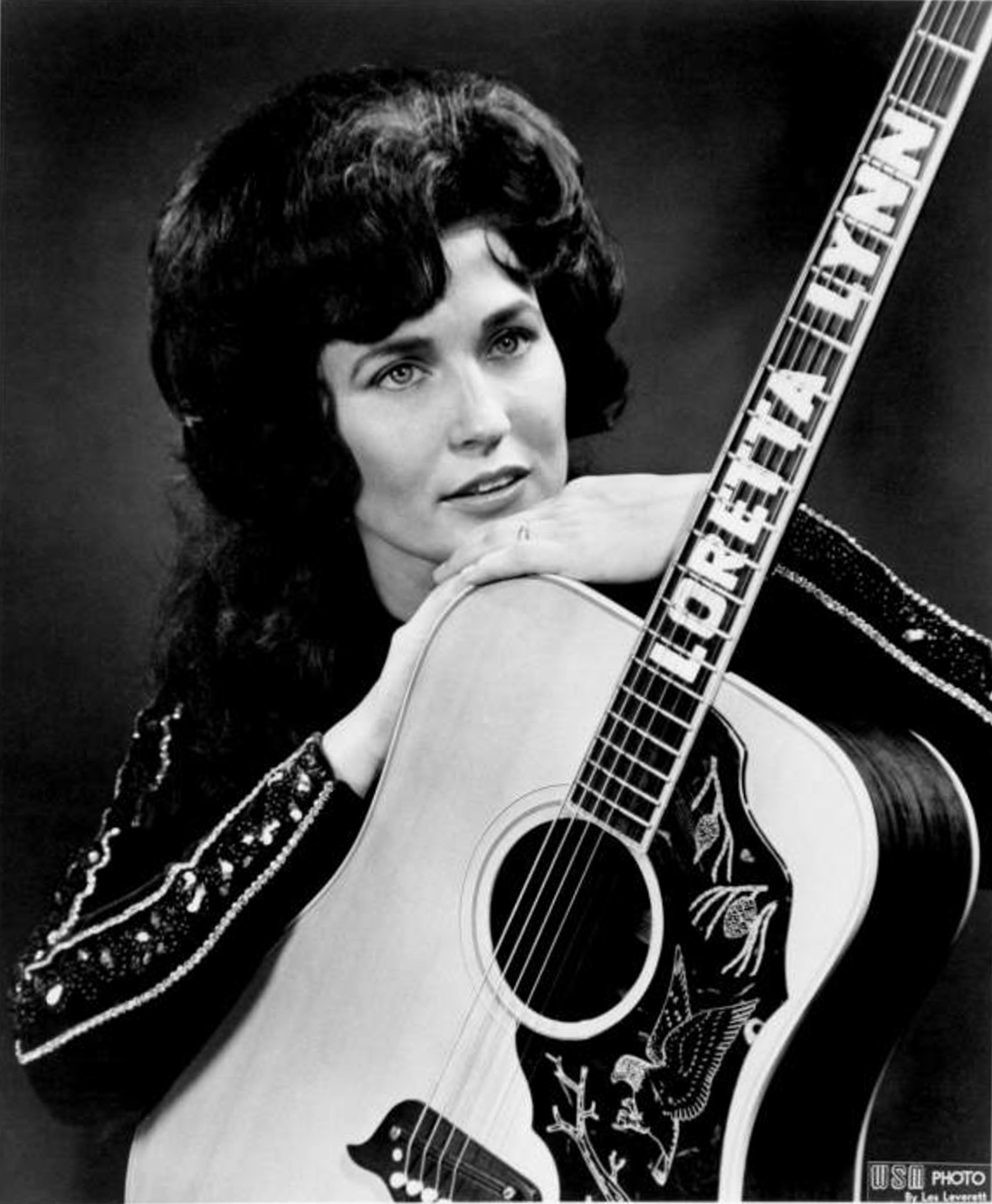
- Lynn in a 1965 publicity portrait
- Studio albums: 50
- Live albums: 2
- Compilation albums: 36
- Tribute albums: 2
- Video albums: 7
- Box sets: 2
- Other album appearances: 27

The discography of American country music singer-songwriter Loretta Lynn includes 50 studio albums, 36 compilation albums, two live albums, seven video albums, two box sets and 27 additional album appearances. Briefly recording with the Zero label, she signed an official recording contract with Decca Records in 1961, remaining there for over 20 years The first under the label was her debut studio album Loretta Lynn Sings (1963). It peaked at number two on the Billboard Top Country Albums survey. Lynn would issue several albums a year with her growing success, including a duet album with Ernest Tubb (1965), a gospel album (1965), and a holiday album (1966). Her seventh studio album You Ain't Woman Enough (1966) was her first release to top the country albums chart and to chart within the Billboard 200. Other albums to reach number one during this period were Don't Come Home a Drinkin' (With Lovin' on Your Mind) (1967) and Fist City. Don't Come A'Drinkin would also become Lynn's first album to certify gold by the Recording Industry Association of America (RIAA).

Lynn's 1971 album Coal Miner's Daughter reached number four on the country albums chart, number 83 on the Billboard 200 and certified gold in the United States. Her third album of gospel music God Bless America Again was issued in 1972 and reached number seven on the country chart. She topped the Top Country Albums list twice in 1973 with the studio albums Entertainer of the Year – Loretta and Love Is the Foundation. Her second greatest hits album appeared in 1974 and would certify gold in the United States. After topping the country albums chart again with Somebody Somewhere (1976), Lynn released a tribute album dedicated to her friend and mentor Patsy Cline, I Remember Patsy (1977).

Lynn entered the 1980s with the studio album Loretta (1980), which became her first release to chart on the Canadian RPM Country Albums survey. She recorded albums with less frequency as the decade progressed. Who Was That Stranger (1988) was Lynn's final studio album with the MCA (formerly Decca Records) label, reaching number 63 on the Top Country Albums chart. In 1993, she collaborated with Dolly Parton and Tammy Wynette to record the studio album Honky Tonk Angels. Reaching number six on the country albums list and 42 on the Billboard 200, the album would also certify gold in the United States and Canada. Lynn then paused her music career due to her husband's failing health. After his death she returned in 2000 with her first solo studio album in 12 years, Still Country. Lynn's next studio album was the critically acclaimed Van Lear Rose (2004). Produced by rock musician Jack White, the album reached number two on the Billboard Top Country Albums chart and number 24 on the Billboard 200. Between 2006 and 2017, Lynn recorded dozens of songs with producer John Carter Cash. In 2016, she released her first studio album contained from these sessions titled Full Circle. This was followed in 2018 by Wouldn't It Be Great.

== Studio albums ==
=== 1960s ===
List of albums, with selected chart positions and certifications, showing other relevant details
Title	Album details	Peak chart positions		Certifications
Title	Album details	US	US Cou.	Certifications
Loretta Lynn Sings	Released: December 9, 1963; Label: Decca; Formats: Vinyl	—	2	
Before I'm Over You	Released: June 22, 1964; Label: Decca; Formats: Vinyl	—	11	
Songs from My Heart....	Released: February 15, 1965; Label: Decca; Formats: Vinyl	—	8	
Blue Kentucky Girl	Released: June 14, 1965; Label: Decca; Formats: Vinyl	—	14	
Mr. and Mrs. Used to Be (with Ernest Tubb)	Released: August 2, 1965; Label: Decca; Formats: Vinyl	—	13	
Hymns	Released: November 15, 1965; Label: Decca; Formats: Vinyl	—	10	
I Like 'Em Country	Released: March 28, 1966; Label: Decca; Formats: Vinyl	—	2	
You Ain't Woman Enough	Released: September 12, 1966; Label: Decca; Formats: Vinyl, 8 Track	140	1	
Country Christmas	Released: October 17, 1966; Label: Decca; Formats: Vinyl	—	—	
Don't Come Home a Drinkin' (With Lovin' on Your Mind)	Released: February 6, 1967; Label: Decca; Formats: Vinyl	80	1	RIAA: Gold
Singin' Again (with Ernest Tubb)	Released: May 29, 1967; Label: Decca; Formats: Vinyl	—	2	
Singin' with Feelin'	Released: October 9, 1967; Label: Decca; Formats: Vinyl	—	3	
Who Says God Is Dead!	Released: January 29, 1968; Label: Decca; Formats: Vinyl	—	44	
Fist City	Released: April 15, 1968; Label: Decca; Formats: Vinyl	—	1	
Your Squaw Is on the Warpath	Released: February 17, 1969; Label: Decca; Formats: Vinyl	168	2	
If We Put Our Heads Together (with Ernest Tubb)	Released: June 9, 1969; Label: Decca; Formats: Vinyl	—	19	
Woman of the World/To Make a Man	Released: July 7, 1969; Label: Decca; Formats: Vinyl	148	2	
"—" denotes a recording that did not chart or was not released in that territory.

=== 1970s ===
List of albums, with selected chart positions and certifications, showing other relevant details
Title	Album details	Peak chart positions			Certifications
Title	Album details	US	US Cou.	CAN Cou.	Certifications
Here's Loretta Singing "Wings Upon Your Horns"	Released: January 5, 1970; Label: Decca; Formats: Vinyl	146	5	—	
Coal Miner's Daughter	Released: January 4, 1971; Label: Decca; Formats: Vinyl	81	4	—	RIAA: Gold
I Wanna Be Free	Released: May 3, 1971; Label: Decca; Formats: Vinyl	110	5	—	
You're Lookin' at Country	Released: September 20, 1971; Label: Decca; Formats: Vinyl	—	7	—	
One's on the Way	Released: March 6, 1972; Label: Decca; Formats: Vinyl	109	3	—	
God Bless America Again	Released: June 5, 1972; Label: Decca; Formats: Vinyl	—	7	—	
Here I Am Again	Released: October 2, 1972; Label: Decca; Formats: Vinyl, cassette	—	4	—	
Entertainer of the Year	Released: February 26, 1973; Label: MCA; Formats: Vinyl, cassette	—	1	—	
Love Is the Foundation	Released: August 13, 1973; Label: MCA; Formats: Vinyl, cassette	183	1	—	
They Don't Make 'Em Like My Daddy	Released: September 2, 1974; Label: MCA; Formats: Vinyl, cassette	—	6	—	
Back to the Country	Released: February 3, 1975; Label: MCA; Formats: Vinyl, cassette	182	2	—	
Home	Released: August 11, 1975; Label: MCA; Formats: Vinyl, cassette	—	7	—	
When the Tingle Becomes a Chill	Released: February 2, 1976; Label: MCA; Formats: Vinyl, cassette	—	6	—	
Somebody Somewhere	Released: October 4, 1976; Label: MCA; Formats: Vinyl, cassette	—	1	—	
I Remember Patsy	Released: April 4, 1977; Label: MCA; Formats: Vinyl, cassette	—	2	—	
Out of My Head and Back in My Bed	Released: February 13, 1978; Label: MCA; Formats: Vinyl, cassette	—	16	—	
We've Come a Long Way, Baby	Released: January 15, 1979; Label: MCA; Formats: Vinyl, cassette	—	19	5	
"—" denotes a recording that did not chart or was not released in that territory.

=== 1980s ===
List of albums, with selected chart positions, showing other relevant details
Title	Album details	Peak chart positions	
Title	Album details	US Cou.	CAN Cou.
Loretta	Released: March 3, 1980; Label: MCA; Formats: Vinyl, cassette	24	5
Lookin' Good	Released: October 13, 1980; Label: MCA; Formats: Vinyl, cassette	17	—
I Lie	Released: February 1, 1982; Label: MCA; Formats: Vinyl, cassette	33	—
Making Love from Memory	Released: September 6, 1982; Label: MCA; Formats: Vinyl, cassette	—	—
Lyin', Cheatin', Woman Chasin', Honky Tonkin', Whiskey Drinkin' You	Released: May 30, 1983; Label: MCA; Formats: Vinyl, cassette	60	—
Just a Woman	Released: July 8, 1985; Label: MCA; Formats: Vinyl, cassette	63	—
Who Was That Stranger	Released: May 24, 1988; Label: MCA; Formats: Vinyl, cassette, CD	63	—
"—" denotes a recording that did not chart or was not released in that territory.

=== 1990s–2020s ===
List of albums, with selected chart positions, showing other relevant details
Title	Album details	Peak chart positions									Certifications
Title	Album details	US	US Cou.	AUS	BEL	CAN	CAN Cou.	NLD	NOR	SWE	Certifications
Honky Tonk Angels (with Dolly Parton and Tammy Wynette)	Released: November 2, 1993; Label: Columbia; Formats: Cassette, CD	42	6	177	—	6	44	—	—	—	MC: Gold; RIAA: Gold
Making More Memories	Released: February 8, 1994; Label: Nashville Sound; Formats: CD	—	—	—	—	—	—	—	—	—	
All Time Gospel Favorites	Released: August 1997; Label: Heartland Music; Formats: CD	—	—	—	—	—	—	—	—	—	
Still Country	Released: September 12, 2000; Label: Audium; Formats: Cassette, CD	—	37	—	—	—	—	—	—	—	
Van Lear Rose	Released: April 27, 2004; Label: Interscope; Formats: CD, digital	24	2	—	—	—	—	—	32	23	
Full Circle	Released: March 4, 2016; Label: Legacy; Formats: Vinyl, CD, digital	19	4	54	137	37	—	23	—	—	
White Christmas Blue	Released: October 7, 2016; Label: Legacy; Formats: Vinyl, CD, digital	—	26	—	—	—	—	—	—	—	
Wouldn't It Be Great	Released: September 28, 2018; Label: Legacy; Formats: Vinyl, CD, digital	78	8	—	—	—	—	—	—	—	
Still Woman Enough	Released: March 19, 2021; Label: Legacy; Formats: Vinyl, CD, digital	83	9	—	—	—	—	—	—	—	
"—" denotes a recording that did not chart or was not released in that territory.

== Compilation albums ==
=== 1960s–1980s ===
List of albums, with selected chart positions and certifications, showing other relevant details
Title	Album details	Peak chart positions	Certifications/ Sales
Title	Album details	US Country	Certifications/ Sales
Here's Loretta Lynn	Released: April 22, 1968; Label: Vocalion; Formats: Vinyl	—	
Loretta Lynn's Greatest Hits	Released: June 10, 1968; Label: Decca; Formats: Vinyl	6	RIAA: Gold
Loretta Lynn Writes 'Em and Sings 'Em	Released: June 8, 1970; Label: Decca; Formats: Vinyl	8	
Alone with You	Released: June 1972; Label: Vocalion; Formats: Vinyl	—	
Ernest Tubb & Loretta Lynn Story	Released: June 1973; Label: MCA; Formats: Vinyl	43	
Loretta Lynn's Greatest Hits Vol. II	Released: May 13, 1974; Label: Decca; Formats: Vinyl, cassette	5	RIAA: Gold
Country Roads	Released: 1976; Label: MCA; Formats: Vinyl, cassette	—	
This Is Loretta Lynn	Released: 1977; Label: MCA; Vinyl, cassette	—	
All My Best	Released: 1978; Label: Tee Vee; Formats: Vinyl, cassette	—	MC: Platinum
Allis-Chalmers Presents Loretta Lynn	Released: 1978; Label: MCA; Formats: Vinyl	—	
Crisco Presents Loretta Lynn's Country Classics	Released: 1979; Label: MCA; Formats: Vinyl	—	
Loretta Lynn Story	Released: 1981; Label: MCA; Formats: Vinyl	—	
The Best of Loretta Lynn	Released: 1985; Label: MCA; Formats: Cassette	—	
Blue Eyed Kentucky Girl	Released: 1985; Label: MCA; Formats: Vinyl, cassette	—	
Golden Greats	Released: 1985; Label: MCA; Formats: Vinyl, cassette, CD	—	
Great Country Hits	Released: 1985; Label: MCA; Formats: Vinyl	—	
20 Greatest Hits	Released: 1987; Label: MCA; Formats: Vinyl, cassette, CD	—	
Just a Closer Walk with Thee (with Patsy Cline)	Released: 1988; Label: MCA; Formats: Cassette, CD	—	
Peace in the Valley	Released: 1988; Label: MCA; Formats: Cassette	—	
"—" denotes a recording that did not chart or was not released in that territory.

=== 1990s–2010s ===
List of albums, with selected chart positions and certifications, showing other relevant details
Title	Album details	Peak chart positions	Certifications/ Sales
Title	Album details	US Country	Certifications/ Sales
The Country Music Hall of Fame Series	Released: February 5, 1991; Label: MCA; Formats: Cassette, CD	—	
Country's Favorite Daughter	Released: 1992; Label: MCA; Formats: Cassette	—	
Gospel's Greatest (with Barbara Mandrell)	Released: 1995; Label: MCA; Formats: Cassette	—	
On Tour #1 (with Patsy Cline)	Released: May 14, 1996; Label: MCA; Formats: Cassette, CD	—	
On Tour #2 (with Patsy Cline)	Released: May 14, 1996; Label: MCA; Formats: Cassette, CD	—	
20th Century Masters – The Millennium Collection	Released: August 17, 1999; Label: MCA; Formats: Cassette, CD	—	
20th Century Masters - The Millennium Collection, Vol. 2	Released: August 17, 2001; Label: MCA; CD	—	
All Time Greatest Hits	Released: May 21, 2002; Label: MCA; Formats: CD	42	
The Gospel Spirit	Released: August 24, 2004; Label: MCA; Formats: CD, music download	—	
The Definitive Collection	Released: June 7, 2005; Label: MCA; Formats: CD, music download	—	
20th Century Masters - The Christmas Collection	Released: September 13, 2005; Label: MCA; Formats: CD	—	
Gold	Released: March 7, 2006; Label: MCA; Formats: CD, music download	—	
Number 1's	Released: August 28, 2007; Label: MCA Nashville; Formats: CD	—	
50th Anniversary Collection	Released: April 6, 2010; Label: Humphead; Formats: CD, music download	44	
Icon	Released: March 1, 2011; Label: MCA Nashville; Formats: CD, LP record	22	US: 180,200
All Time Gospel Favorites	Released: March 1, 2011; Label: Time Life; Formats: CD	67	
Hymns & Gospel Favorites	Released: April 14, 2015; Label: Gaither; Formats: CD	48	
"—" denotes a recording that did not chart or was not released in that territory.

== Live albums ==
List of albums, showing relevant details
Title	Album details
Live from the Wheeling Jamboree	Released: 1986; Label: Loretta Lynn, Inc./MCA; Formats: Vinyl, cassette

== Box sets ==
List of albums, showing relevant details
Title	Album details
Honky Tonk Girl: The Loretta Lynn Collection	Released: September 13, 1994; Label: MCA; Formats: Cassette, CD
Chronicles	Released: March 28, 2006; Label: MCA Nashville; Formats: CD

== Video albums ==
List of albums, showing relevant details
Title	Album details
Loretta	Released: 1980; Label: MCA DiscoVision; Formats: Laserdisc
In Concert	Released: 1990; Label: Whittington Entertainment Group; Formats: VHS
Honky Tonk Girl	Released: June 22, 1994; 1996; Label: Pioneer Artists, Capital Cities/ABC Video Enterprises, Inc., White Star; Formats: Laserdisc, VHS, DVD
Two Great Life Stories in One: Loretta Lynn and Patsy Cline (UK) / Legends of Country: You're Looking At Country / Remembering Patsy (US)	Released: 2001; Label: Prism Leisure (UK), Music Video Distributors (US); Formats: DVD
Songs of Inspiration	Released: 2005; Label: MPI Home Video; Formats: DVD
Remembering Van Lear Rose (with Jack White)	Released: June 24, 2015; Label: Third Man; Formats: DVD
American Masters: Still A Mountain Girl	Released: March 4, 2016; Label: Legacy; Formats: DVD

== Other album appearances ==
List of guest album appearances, with other performing artists, showing year released and album name
Title	Year	Other artist(s)	Album
"Love Is the Foundation"	1976	The Coal Miners	On the Road with Loretta and the Coal Miners
"Secret Love"	1976	The Coal Miners	On the Road with Loretta and the Coal Miners
"It's Dynomite"	1976	Ernest Ray Lynn and the Coal Miners	On the Road with Loretta and the Coal Miners
"Is It Love, It Must Be Love"	1979	Frankie Bleu	The Fish That Saved Pittsburgh (soundtrack)
"Thanks a Lot"	1979	Ernest Tubb	The Legend and the Legacy
"Answer the Phone"	1979	Ernest Tubb; Billy Grammer	The Legend and the Legacy
"Count on Me"	1981	—N/a	Sesame Street Country
"We Sure Make Good Love"	1984	George Jones	Ladies' Choice
"Nobody Loves Me But My Mother"	1987	Eugene Chadbourne	LSD C&W: The History of the Chadbournes in America
"The First Noel"	1988	—N/a	Tennessee Christmas
"Shopping for Dresses"	1990	Randy Travis	Heroes & Friends
"Out of My Head and Back in My Bed" (Live)	1999	—N/a	Live at Gilley's, Vol. 1–4
"She's Got You" (Live)	1999	—N/a	Live at Gilley's, Vol. 1–4
"Mind Your Own Business"	1999	—N/a	Lost Highway: A Tribute to Hank Williams
"You Ain't Woman Enough"	2004	—N/a	Nashville Rebel (soundtrack)
"Country Music Has the Blues" (also featuring George Jones)	2006	Billy Ray Cyrus	Wanna Be Your Joe
"I Know How"	2007	—N/a	The Best of the Johnny Cash TV Show
"Will You Visit Me on Sunday"	2007	Marty Stuart	Compadres: An Anthology of Duets
"Wildwood Flower"	2007	—N/a	Anchored in Love: A Tribute to June Carter Cash
"Where No One Stands Alone"	2008	—N/a	How Great Thou Art: Gospel Favorites from the Grand Ole Opry
"I Wanna Be Free"	2008	Daniel O'Donnell	Country Boy
"Don't Tempt Me"	2009	Todd Snider	The Excitement Plan
"Somewhere Between"	2013	Willie Nelson	To All the Girls...
"Take Your Gun and Go, John"	2013	—N/a	Divided & United: The Songs of the Civil War
"It Wasn't God Who Made Honky Tonk Angels"	2016	—N/a	Remembering Kitty Wells: The Queen of Country Music
"Mountain Momma"	2018	Davidxrussell	It's All for Her
"Put It Off Until Tomorrow"	2019	Crystal Gayle; Peggy Sue	You Don't Know Me: Classic Country
