= Still Woman Enough (album) =

Studio album by Loretta Lynn
- Released: March 19, 2021
- Recorded: 2007–2020
- Studio: Cash Cabin Studio (Hendersonville, Tennessee); Loretta Lynn's Ranch (Hurricane Mills); Willowbrooke Studios (Franklin)
- Genre: Country
- Length: 35:09
- Label: Legacy
- Producer: Patsy Lynn Russell; John Carter Cash

Loretta Lynn chronology
Wouldn't It Be Great (2018)	Still Woman Enough (2021)

Singles from Still Woman Enough
- 1. "Coal Miner's Daughter (Recitation)" Released: January 4, 2021; 2. "One's on the Way" Released: February 19, 2021

Still Woman Enough is the forty-sixth and final solo studio album by American country music singer-songwriter Loretta Lynn. It was released on March 19, 2021, by Legacy Recordings. The album was produced by Lynn's daughter Patsy Lynn Russell and John Carter Cash, the son of Johnny Cash and June Carter Cash. The album shares its title with Lynn's 2002 autobiography.

The album was recorded at Cash Cabin Studio in Hendersonville, Tennessee, following Full Circle (2016), White Christmas Blue (2016), and Wouldn't It Be Great (2018). The album is a mixture of new songs and new versions of songs Lynn has previously recorded.

== Background ==
Following the release of 2018's Wouldn't It Be Great, which had to be postponed several times after Lynn suffered a stroke in May 2017, she took a hiatus from releasing new music throughout 2019 and 2020. Her musical output during these two years totaled just two songs. She and sister Peggy Sue were featured on the song "Put It Off Until Tomorrow" from sister Crystal Gayle's album You Don't Know Me in 2019 and Lynn released one single in 2020, a cover of Patsy Cline's hit "I Fall to Pieces", to promote her book Me & Patsy Kickin' Up Dust: My Friendship with Patsy Cline.

On January 2, 2021, Lynn teased the possibility of a new album in a Facebook post saying, "I am so glad it's a new year! I'm looking forward to some new projects in 2021."

The album cover features Lynn wearing a newly designed couture dress inspired by the dress she wore on the cover of her 1971 album Coal Miner's Daughter. It was specifically created for the album by her long-time dressmaker Tim Cobb.

=== Previous recordings ===
Seven songs from the album are new versions of songs previously recorded by Lynn:

- "Honky Tonk Girl" was first recorded by Lynn in 1960 and released as her first single on Zero Records. Lynn recorded the song again in 1968 during the sessions for Your Squaw Is on the Warpath, but this recording was not released until 1991 on the compilation album The Country Music Hall of Fame. Lynn provided backing vocals for her granddaughter Tayla Lynn's cover of the song on her 2016 EP The Ranch.
- "Coal Miner's Daughter" was previously recorded by Lynn on her 1971 album of the same name, and again with Miranda Lambert and Sheryl Crow for the 2010 compilation album Coal Miner's Daughter: A Tribute to Loretta Lynn. Lynn revisited the song a third time on her 2018 album Wouldn't It Be Great.
- "One's on the Way" was previously recorded by Lynn on her 1971 album of the same name.
- "I Wanna Be Free" was previously recorded by Lynn on her 1971 album of the same name.
- "Where No One Stands Alone" was previously recorded by Lynn on her 1965 album Hymns.
- "My Love" was previously recorded by Lynn in 1960 for Zero Records, but this recording was not released until 1968 on the compilation album Here's Loretta Lynn.
- "You Ain't Woman Enough" was previously recorded by Lynn for her 1966 album of the same name.

== Release and promotion ==
The album was announced on January 4, 2021, the fiftieth anniversary of the release of Lynn's Coal Miner's Daughter album. The album was made available for preorder the same day. It was released on March 19, 2021, on LP, CD, and digital download.

=== Singles ===
The first single from the album, a recitation of Lynn's signature song "Coal Miner's Daughter", was released on January 4 along with its music video. The David McClister directed video was filmed on July 9, 2020, at Lynn's ranch in Hurricane Mills, Tennessee.

"One's on the Way", a duet with Margo Price, was released as the second single on February 19, 2021.

== Critical reception ==
Professional ratings
Aggregate scores
Source	Rating
Metacritic	76/100
Review scores
Source	Rating
AllMusic	3/5 stars
American Songwriter	4.5/5 stars
The Guardian	4/5 stars
Mojo	4/5 stars
NME	4/5 stars
Pitchfork	7.5/10
Rolling Stone	3.5/5 stars
The Telegraph	4/5 stars
Uncut	7/10
Under the Radar	7/10 stars

Still Woman Enough received mostly positive reviews from critics. At Metacritic, which assigns a normalized rating out of 100 to reviews from mainstream critics, Still Woman Enough has an average score of 76 based on 11 reviews.

Alexis Petridis of The Guardian gave the album four out of five stars. He noted that while there is "only one new Lynn original...her voice sounds frankly astonishing." Mojo also gave the album four out of five stars, calling it "Lynn's show, and she and the band are on fine form." In another four star review for NME, Leonie Cooper said that Lynn's message remains the same, "with the focus on women’s innate strength and capabilities."

Rolling Stone gave the album 3.5 out of five stars, praising Lynn for "sounding as tough as ever and reaffirming her badass credentials." Uncut rated the album seven out of ten, saying that it "may be sustained by [Lynn's] memories, but it's not overshadowed by them."

The album's lowest rating came from Stephen Thomas Erlewine at AllMusic. He rated the album three out of five stars, saying that "the format doesn't seem as fresh as it did back in 2016...due to it being the fourth in a series of albums." He felt that "on its own merits, Still Woman Enough is strong and vibrant, a testament to Lynn's enduring gifts and place in the firmament of 20th century country music."

== Track listing ==
Still Woman Enough track listing
No.	Title	Writer(s)	Length
1.	"Still Woman Enough" (featuring Reba McEntire and Carrie Underwood)	Loretta Lynn; Patsy Lynn Russell	3:37
2.	"Keep on the Sunny Side"	A.P. Carter	2:55
3.	"Honky Tonk Girl"	Lynn	2:32
4.	"I Don't Feel at Home Anymore"	Traditional; arr. by Lynn	2:03
5.	"Old Kentucky Home"	Stephen Foster; Lynn	2:27
6.	"Coal Miner's Daughter" (Recitation)	Lynn	2:07
7.	"One's on the Way" (featuring Margo Price)	Shel Silverstein	2:41
8.	"I Wanna Be Free"	Lynn	2:15
9.	"Where No One Stands Alone"	Mosie Lister	2:47
10.	"I'll Be All Smiles Tonight"	T.B. Ransom	3:38
11.	"I Saw the Light"	Hank Williams	3:06
12.	"My Love"	Lynn	2:44
13.	"You Ain't Woman Enough" (featuring Tanya Tucker)	Lynn	2:17
Total length:			35:09

== Personnel ==
Adapted from the album liner notes.

Performance

- Mike Bub – upright bass (track 3), bass (track 8, 13)
- Shawn Camp – mandolin (tracks 2, 4–5, 9–10, 13), acoustic guitar (tracks 3, 7–8, 11), backing vocals (track 11)
- John Carter Cash – electric guitar (tracks 1, 7), acoustic guitar (track 1)
- Charlie Chadwick – cello (track 12)
- Matt Combs – fiddle (tracks 1, 6–7)
- Dennis Crouch – upright bass (tracks 1–2, 10, 12)
- Paul Franklin – steel (tracks 3, 7–8, 13)
- Tony Harrell – piano (tracks 3–4, 7–9, 11, 13)
- Jamie Hartford – electric guitar (tracks 1, 3, 7–8, 12–13), acoustic guitar (tracks 4, 9, 11)
- Rick Lonow – drums (tracks 1, 3–4, 7–9, 11–13)
- Loretta Lynn — lead vocals (all tracks)
- Ronnie McCoury – mandolin (track 1, 12)
- Reba McEntire – lead vocals (track 1)
- Pat McLaughlin – mandolin (tracks 3, 7–8), acoustic guitar (track 13)
- Larry Perkins – banjo (tracks 3, 7–8, 13)
- Margo Price – lead vocals (track 7)
- Suzi Ragsdale – backing vocals (track 2)
- Dave Roe – upright bass (track 5)
- Randy Scruggs – acoustic guitar (tracks 1, 3, 7–8, 12–13)
- Will Smith – autoharp (track 10)
- Tanya Tucker – lead vocals (track 13)
- Robby Turner – dobro (tracks 1, 4), steel (track 9, 11–12)
- Carrie Underwood — lead vocals (track 1)
- Pete Wade – electric guitar (tracks 4, 9, 11)
- Jeff White – acoustic guitar (tracks 2, 5, 10)
- Laura Weber White – acoustic guitar (tracks 1–5, 7–13), fiddle (tracks 11–12), backing vocals (track 11)
- Mark W. Winchester – upright bass (tracks 4, 9, 11)

Production

- Trey Call – mixing (tracks 1, 2, 7, 13), production management (Cash Cabin Enterprises), second engineer
- Richard Dodd – mastering (all tracks)
- John Carter Cash – producer (all tracks)
- Joseph Cash – production assistant, additional engineering
- Forrest Cashion – production assistant
- Lauren Moore – production assistant
- Lowell Reynolds – recording (Tanya Tucker vocals on track 13)
- Patsy Lynn Russell – producer (all tracks)
- Chuck Turner – recording (all tracks), mixing (all tracks)

Other personnel

- Frank Harkins – art direction and design
- Russ Harrington – front and back photography
- John Jackson – A&R (Sony Legacy)
- David McClister – inside sleeve photo

== Charts ==
Chart performance for Still Woman Enough
Chart (2021)	Peak position
US Billboard 200	83
US Top Country Albums (Billboard)	9
UK Country Albums (OCC)	3
Scottish Albums (OCC)	47
US Americana/Folk Albums (Billboard)	4
