= Laura Weber White =

American country fiddler

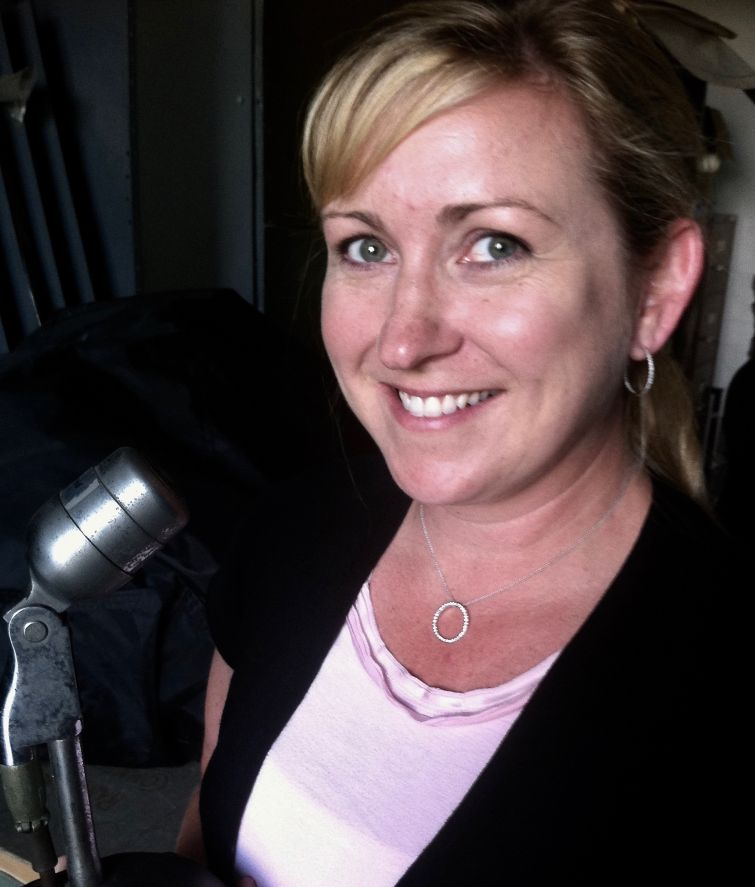

Background information
- Born: Laura Weber; 1971 (age 54–55); Sandwich, Illinois, U.S
- Origin: Nashville, Tennessee, United States
- Genres: Country, folk, bluegrass, gospel
- Occupations: Singer, musician, songwriter
- Instruments: Vocals; guitar; fiddle
- Years active: 1990–present
- Label: House of Cash
- Spouses: John Carter Cash (m. 2000; div. 2013); Jeff White (m. 2017)

Laura Weber White, also known as Laura White, Laura Weber, Laura Cash, and Laura Weber Cash is an American country fiddler, singer, songwriter, and guitar player. White has worked as a session musician on many albums and toured with several artists, including the late Johnny Cash and June Carter Cash. She has released two solo albums: Among My Souvenirs in 2003 and Awake But Dreaming in 2010. Both were recorded at the Cash Cabin Studio. White became known as a fine stage fiddler after winning both state and National Fiddler contests in Oregon and Idaho. She is an artist on 16 Cash family albums from 2003 to 2014.

In 1999, White joined the Press On tour with Carter Cash and Johnny Cash, where she met their son, John Carter Cash, whom she wed in 2000. They later divorced in 2013. She played on June Carter Cash's 2003 album, Wildwood Flower, which won a Grammy Award for Best Traditional Folk album. White also contributed fiddle to Johnny Cash's American III and American IV albums.

From 2012 to 2016, White was a member of the Carter Family III music group. The Carter Family III released their first album, Past & Present, in 2010. The Carter Family III was made up of Laura Cash, John Cash and Dale Jett. Dale Jett is the grandson of A.P. Carter and Sara Carter. John Carter is the grandson of Maybelle Carter.

White played for the 45th Annual Academy of Country Music Awards in 2010. She played in the documentary, The Winding Stream: The Carters, the Cashes and the Course of Country Music, the story of the musical generations of the Carter and Cash families.

== Biography ==
Laurie not only loves Country Music, but she knows Country Music, and the proof is in this record, Loretta Lynn on Awake But Dreaming album

Laura Weber White was born in Sandwich, Illinois in 1971 while her parents were living in Plano, Illinois, at the time. The family moved when she was 6 and she grew up in Corvallis, Oregon. She started to play music at the age of nine. She received from her father a restored fiddle which became her special instrument. To have the fiddle restored, her dad traded carpentry work for the restoration. She started to win fiddling contests in the western United States at age 12. Her teacher was fiddler and rhythm guitarist Joey McKenzie. She won a number of State and Regional titles. By 17 she won the National Junior Fiddle Champion title at Weiser, Idaho. In 1989 she enrolled in Oregon State University, but in 1990, she departed college at age 18 to take a job playing and singing with Patty Loveless in Nashville. She had been in Nashville before for Grand Master's Fiddle Contests. In addition to fiddling, she sings, plays the guitar and mandolin. In 1991 White played bluegrass in Sakaide, Kagawa. Back in Nashville, she toured with Patty Loveless, Pam Tillis, James House, Harley Allen and Chalee Tennison. She played fiddle with Roy Acuff on his show. She played the Grand Ole Opry with Ray Price, and has recorded with many artists including: Johnny Cash, George Jones, Loretta Lynn, Kris Kristofferson, Merle Haggard, Willie Nelson, Sheryl Crow, Billy Joe Shaver, Larry Gatlin, Rodney Crowell, Earl Scruggs, Benny Martin, Larry Gatlin, Emmylou Harris, and Marty Stuart.

White has two children with her ex-husband John Carter Cash. She lives in Nashville with her husband, Jeff White, a bluegrass guitarist and singer. They were married on March 12, 2017, in Goodlettsville, Tennessee.

== Discography ==
White's Discography:

=== Albums ===
Solo Albums

Year	Album	Note
2003	Among My Souvenirs	
2010	Awake But Dreaming	

Group Album

Year	Album	Artist	Note
2010	Past & Present	Carter Family III	Vocals, Guitar, Fiddle

Vocals

Year	Album	Artist	Note
1999	The "Big Tiger" Roars Again; Part I	Benny Martin	Vocals, Fiddle
2003	Wildwood Flower	June Carter Cash	Vocals, Guitar, Fiddle – Grammy winning
2004	Gone But Not Forgotten	Johnny Cash	Lead Vocals Song: The Far Side Banks Of Jordan (Live at The Carter Family Fold)
2004	Last Of Their Kind	Janette Carter – Joe Carter	Vocals, Fiddle
2005	Her Life In Music	June Carter Cash	Vocals, Fiddle
2005	Down In Caroline	Curly Seckler	Vocals, Fiddle
2006	Bluegrass, Don’t You Know	Curly Seckler	Vocals Purple Heart
2007	Everybody's Brother	Billy Joe Shaver	Vocals – Grammy-nominated
2008	Pale Imperfect Diamond	Cedar Hill Refugees	Vocals
2011	Fast Company	Bob Flores	Vocals
2013	Pickin' Like A Girl	The Daughters Of Bluegrass	Vocals, Fiddle
2016	Full Circle	Loretta Lynn	Vocals, Guitar
2016	Right Beside You	Jeff White	Vocals, Fiddle

Instruments

Year	Album	Artist	Note
2000	American III: Solitary Man	Johnny Cash	Fiddle
2001	Timeless	Various Artists	Fiddle
2001	Songs Of The Civil War	Various Artists	Fiddle Faded Coat of Blue
2001	Hank Williams The Original	Various Artists	Fiddle
2002	American IV: The Man Comes Around	Johnny Cash	Fiddle, production assistant
2003	Unearthed	Johnny Cash	Fiddle, Backing Vocals
2003	Das Tennessee-Projekt	Gunter Gabriel	Fiddle
2003	Wildwood Flower	June Carter Cash	Fiddle, Acoustic Guitar
2004	Joe and Janette Carter Last Of Their Kind	Janette Carter – Joe Carter	Acoustic Guitar, Backing Vocals
2004	Her Life In Music	June Carter Cash	Guitar, Backing Vocals
2004	The Unbroken Circle (The Musical Heritage Of The Carter Family)	Various Artists	Fiddle – 3 Grammy nominations.
2005	The Legend	Johnny Cash	Fiddle
2006	American V: A Hundred Highways	Johnny Cash	Fiddle
2006	Voice Of The Spirit	Various artists	Fiddle
2006	June Carter and Johnny Cash: Duets	Johnny Cash & June Carter Cash	Fiddle
2007	Everybody's Brother	Billy Joe Shaver	Fiddle
2007	Anchored in Love: A Tribute to June Carter Cash	Various artists	Fiddle, Acoustic Guitar, Backing Vocals
2008	Honkytonk Mood	Devin Derrick	Fiddle.
2008	Heritage	The Youngers	Fiddle.
2010	Coal Miner's Daughter: A Tribute to Loretta Lynn	Various artists	Fiddle
2010	American VI: Ain't No Grave	Johnny Cash	Fiddle, Acoustic Guitar,
2011	Hank Williams: Timeless Tribute	Various artists	Fiddle
2014	Out Among the Stars	Johnny Cash	Fiddle
2015	The Winding Stream: The Carters, the Cashes and the Course of Country Music. Winding Stream	The Carter Family, Carter Family III, Cash Family and other Artists	Fiddle, Backing Vocals
2016	White Christmas Blue	Loretta Lynn	Acoustic Guitar, Fiddle
2018	Wouldn't It Be Great	Loretta Lynn	Acoustic Guitar, Fiddle
2021	Still Woman Enough	Loretta Lynn	Acoustic Guitar
2021	Michael Carpenter And The Banks Brothers – Introducing…	Michael Carpenter	Acoustic Guitar, fiddle

=== Performances ===
- Selected: Tours, Performances and Events.

Year	Event	Artist	Note
1984	Oregon Old Time Fiddlers State Contest	Laura Weber	Fiddle 1st Place Junior Division
1985	Oregon Old Time Fiddlers State Contest	Laura Weber	Fiddle 2nd Place Junior Division
1986	Oregon Old Time Fiddlers State Contest	Laura Weber	Fiddle 1st Place Junior Division
1987	Oregon Old Time Fiddlers State Contest	Laura Weber	Fiddle 1st Place Junior Division and 1st Place Twin Fiddles
1988	National Oldtime Fiddlers’ Junior Champion	Laura Weber	Fiddle 1st Place Junior Champion and 1st Place Twin Fiddles
1989	National Oldtime Fiddlers’ Junior Champion	Laura Weber	1st Place Twin Fiddles
1990	Patty Loveless On Down the Line tour	Patty Loveless	Fiddle, Guitar, Backing Vocals
1992–1993	Bluegrass in Japan	Laura Weber, Scott Vestal, Jeff Autry, Dave Peters, and Gena Britt	Fiddle, Vocals
December 4, 1994	Curly Seckler Birthday Party at Ford Theater	Various Artists	Fiddle, Vocals
1996–1997	Pam Tillis All of This Love tour	Pam Tillis	Fiddle, Vocals
1999	June Carter Press On tour	June Carter-Cash	Fiddle, Vocals
1999	The Carter Family Fold Festival	June Carter-Cash and The Living Circle Band	Fiddle, Vocals
Nov 10, 2003	A Nashville Tribute to Johnny Cash; Ryman Auditorium and TV	Laura & Larry Gatlin	Fiddle, Vocals
2008	American Roots Music Festival in Turner, Oregon	Laura in Carter Family III	Fiddle, Vocals
April 4, 2009	Grand Ole Opry	Laura Weber	Fiddle
2009	National Oldtime Fiddlers' Contest; 1st Place Adult Division	Laura	Fiddle, (Later has become a contest judge).
February. 11, 2010	Music from the Mountain, legacy of Mother Maybelle Carter concert Lipscomb University	Various Artists	Fiddle
April 18, 2010	45th Annual Academy of Country Music Awards	Various Artists	Fiddle
2011	Johnny Cash Music Festival in Dyess, Arkansas; Cash House Benefit (Live and DVD)	Cash Family, Kris Kristofferson, and Various Artists	Fiddle
May 25, 2013	Gathering in the Gap Music Festival; Southwest Virginia Museum Historical State Park	Carter Family III	Fiddle
Oct. 26, 2014	Country Music Hall of Fame Medallion Ceremony	Various Artists	Fiddle
2014	Stoney Pointe Jamboree	Various Artists	Fiddle, Vocals
2015	Country Music Hall of Fame and Museum	Fiddle Demonstration: Laura Cash	Fiddle
2016	The Winding Stream: The Carters, the Cashes and the Course of Country Music. Winding Stream DVD	The Carter Family III, Cash Family and other Artists	Fiddle, Vocals
2020	Mac Wiseman farewell	Laura Weber White and other Artists	Fiddle, Vocals

== See also ==
- List of country musicians
