= Diamond Duet =

Studio album by Conway Twitty and Loretta Lynn
- Released: October 22, 1979
- Recorded: May–July 1979
- Studio: Woodland (Nashville, Tennessee)
- Genre: Country
- Length: 26:26
- Label: MCA
- Producer: David Barnes; Conway Twitty; Loretta Lynn

Conway Twitty and Loretta Lynn chronology
Honky Tonk Heroes (1978)	Diamond Duet (1979)	Two's a Party (1981)

Conway Twitty chronology
Cross Winds (1979)	Diamond Duet (1979)	Heart and Soul (1980)

Loretta Lynn chronology
We've Come a Long Way, Baby (1979)	Diamond Duet (1979)	Loretta (1980)

Singles from Diamond Duet
- 1. "You Know Just What I'd Do" Released: October 22, 1979; 2. "It's True Love" Released: April 21, 1980

Diamond Duet is the ninth collaborative studio album by Conway Twitty and Loretta Lynn. It was released on October 22, 1979, by MCA Records.

== Critical reception ==
In the November 17, 1979 issue, Billboard's review said, "This is the popular country duo's tenth anniversary of making records together. hence the title, Diamond Duet. With a selection of contemporary and standard songs, the duo score with Randy Goodrum's "True Love" and Mac Davis' "Baby Don't Get Hooked On Me". Also contained is a rousing version of "Hit the Road Jack" and Hank Cochran's "That's All That Matters". The album contains two Foster Rice titles, including the first single "You Know Just What I'd Do," and "Rising Above It All". Overall, the production is sparkling throughout the album, with an excellent choice of material. Twitty and Lynn should make records for another ten years."

Cashbox published a review in the November 3, 1979 issue which said, "This album celebrates ten years worth of duets from Conway and Loretta and they present a gem of an album. The songs are all well selected and balanced showing the duo stretching out from their traditional hard country sound. Best cuts are "What's a Little Love Between Friends", "The Sadness of It All", "That's All That Matters" and "Rising Above It All." This duet continues to come on strong."

== Commercial performance ==
The album peaked at No. 22 on the US Billboard Hot Country LP's chart, becoming the duo's lowest charting album at the time.

The album's first single, "You Know Just What I'd Do", was released in October 1979 peaked at No. 9 on the US Billboard Hot Country Singles chart. In Canada, it peaked at No. 5 on the RPM Country Singles chart, marking the duo's ninth single to peak in the top 10 in both countries. The second single, "It's True Love", was released in April 1980 peaked at No. 5 in the US and No. 2 in Canada, marking the duo's tenth top ten hit in both countries.

== Track listing ==
Side one
No.	Title	Writer(s)	Length
1.	"It's True Love"	Randy Goodrum	2:52
2.	"That's All That Matters"	Hank Cochran	2:34
3.	"Hit the Road Jack"	Percy Mayfield	2:13
4.	"Baby Don't Get Hooked On Me"	Mac Davis	2:47
5.	"Even a Fool Would Let Go"	Kerry Chater; Tom Snow	2:56

Side two
No.	Title	Writer(s)	Length
1.	"The Sadness of It All"	Russell Wolfe, III	2:59
2.	"You Know Just What I'd Do"	Bill Rice; Jerry Foster	2:44
3.	"What's a Little Love Between Friends?"	Billy Burnette; Larry Henley	2:16
4.	"Rising Above It All"	Rice; Foster	2:54
5.	"You Never Cross My Mind"	Curly Putman; Deborah Allen; Rafe Van Hoy	2:11

== Personnel ==
Adapted from the album liner notes.

- David Barnes – Arrangements
- Danny Hilley – Engineer
- David McKinley – Engineer
- Conway Twitty – Producer
- David Barnes – Producer
- Loretta Lynn – Producer
- Denny Purcell – Mastering

Musicians:

- Johnny Christopher – acoustic guitar
- Mike Leech – bass
- Jerry Carrigan – drums
- Cindy Reynolds – harp
- Bobby Wood – keyboards
- Reggie Young – lead guitar
- Jerry Carrigan – percussion
- John Hughey – steel guitar
- The Sheldon Kurland Strings - strings
- Dennis Solee – woodwinds
- Duane West, Janie Fricke, Lea Jane Berinati, Tom Brannon - backing vocals

== Charts ==
=== Album ===
Chart (1979)	Peak chart position
US Hot Country LP's (Billboard)	22

=== Singles ===
Title	Year	Peak chart position	
Title	Year	US Country	CAN Country
"You Know Just What I'd Do"	1979	9	5
"It's True Love"	1980	5	2
