= Coal Miner's Daughter (song) =

1970 single by Loretta Lynn

Single by Loretta Lynn

from the album Coal Miner's Daughter
- B-side: "The Man of the House"
- Released: October 5, 1970
- Recorded: October 1, 1969
- Studio: Bradley's Barn, Mount Juliet, Tennessee
- Genre: Country
- Length: 3:00
- Label: Decca
- Songwriter: Loretta Lynn
- Producer: Owen Bradley

Loretta Lynn singles chronology
"You Wanna Give Me a Lift" (1970)	"Coal Miner's Daughter" (1970)	"I Wanna Be Free" (1971)

"Coal Miner's Daughter" is a song written and recorded by American singer-songwriter Loretta Lynn. Considered Lynn's signature song, it was originally released as a single in 1970 and became a number one hit on the Billboard country chart. It was later released on an album of the same name. Produced by Owen Bradley, the song tells the story of Lynn's coal-mining father in rural Kentucky during the Great Depression. Lynn, who was born in 1932 and experienced the Great Depression as a child, also describes her childhood and the circumstances she was raised in during those years.

"Coal Miner's Daughter" would receive positive reviews from journalists and music critics alike following its release. It would become one of Lynn's signature recordings in her career. It would also be considered one of music's most significant recordings, according to polls from Time and the Recording Industry Association of America. The song has been covered several times since its original release, notably in a collaboration from Lynn, Sheryl Crow and Miranda Lambert.

== Background and composition ==
The music and lyrics of "Coal Miner's Daughter" had been written entirely by Loretta Lynn. She composed the song in 1969, a year before its official recording. While writing the lyrics, Lynn composed the melody at the same time. The melody had originally been written in a bluegrass style, which matched the style of music she was raised singing. According to Lynn, she had trouble rhyming some of the song's words. "I had to match up words like “holler” and “daughter” and “water.” But after it was done, the rhymes weren't so important," Lynn wrote in her 1976 autobiography. Lynn spent several hours writing the remainder of the song. When it was completed, a total of nine verses were composed.

The song recounts the day-to-day life of her childhood growing up in rural poverty in Butcher Hollow, Kentucky. In the lyrics, Lynn describes herself as the daughter of a coal mining father. She recounted how her father also worked as a farmer growing corn. Along with her father, Lynn also wrote about her mother and how she worked tirelessly on household duties such as cleaning and washing. Subsequent verses recall Lynn's other childhood experiences and hardships, such as her mother reading the Bible by a coal-oil light or having bloody fingers from constantly doing the laundry using a wash board. Decades later, Lynn revealed that the song only hinted at other childhood experiences. "The song doesn’t tell half of it. If I told the whole story nobody would believe it now anyway."

== Recording ==
Lynn recorded the song upon the encouragement of her longtime record producer, Owen Bradley. However, Bradley disliked that Lynn's original written version contained ten verses. Fearing the song would be as long as Marty Robbins' hit "El Paso," Bradley told her: "There’s already been an ‘El Paso,’ there didn't need to be another one." Before recording, she removed extra verses of the song related to further mentions of her father and life in rural Kentucky. Lynn also removed lines related to her mother killing a pig during an annual "hog-killing day." In total, four verses were removed from the original composition. Lynn later recalled removing the verses: " I cried the whole time. And I have lost those verses, I do not remember them. I wish I did." "Coal Miner's Daughter" was officially recorded on October 1, 1969, at Bradley's own Bradley's Barn recording studio located in Mount Juliet, Tennessee. The background vocalists for the session were the Jordanaires. Also recorded during the same session were the tracks "Wings Upon Your Horns" and "You Wanna Give Me a Lift." Both recordings would later be hits for Lynn as well.

Owen Bradley allowed Lynn to record the song using her planned arrangement. The song opened featuring a steel guitar and was followed by a fiddle. She then sang the song to the band and it was cut live in the studio during the session. Additionally, her husband, Doolittle Lynn, suggested the incorporation of a banjo into the song, which was eventually added as well. According to Lynn, only a couple of takes of the song were recorded before compiling them together. "I never did many takes of anything. The more I sing, the worse I get. I like to make it fresh," she reflected. Unlike live performances, the recorded version of "Coal Miner's Daughter" did not include guitar-playing by Lynn herself. Only included was her live vocal. Instead guitarists from The Nashville A-Team were chosen for the record.

== Critical reception ==
"Coal Miner's Daughter" has received a positive reception from critics since its original 1970 release. In 1971, Billboard magazine praised the song for retaining "true country flavor." Cary O'Dell of the Library of Congress called it Lynn's "most autobiographical song" and commented on its importance to the country music genre. "It is perhaps one of country music’s most autobiographical songs ever, a major achievement for a genre which often specializes in memoirs set to music, Parton’s 'Coat of Many Colors' being a prime example," he wrote. Mary A. Bufwack and Robert K. Oermann found the song to be a symbol of Lynn's pride in being a working class person. "She stuck out her chin to defend poor folks culture...Like the lady, herself, Loretta's songs shoot from the hip. Her pride is in her working class background," they wrote in 2003.

Music critics of Rolling Stone also gave "Coal Miner's Daughter" a positive response and named it one of Lynn's "20 Essential Songs." "With astonishing economy, the pride of Butcher Holler details her sparse but happy childhood and the things they did keep shoes on their feet (specifically, sell a hog). She ends the tune in a place of greater means, but undeniably proud of where she’s been," they commented. In 2024, the publication ranked the song at #14 on its 200 Greatest Country Songs of All Time ranking.

Billy Dukes of Taste of Country called the tune "without a doubt one of the most well-known hits of all time." Wide Open Country's Bobbie Jean Sawyer ranked it number one on her list of "The 15 Best Of All Time" songs by Lynn. "In just three minutes, the song sums up Lynn's incredible life and the career that made her a country icon," Sawyer wrote.

== Release and chart performance ==
"Coal Miner's Daughter" was released as a single to radio one year after its recording. It was issued to via Decca Records as a seven inch vinyl single on October 5, 1970. Included on the B-side was the track, "The Man of the House." The song became a number one hit on the Billboard Hot Country Singles chart later that year, spending one week at the position. It was Lynn's fourth number one single in her career and one of 16 chart-topping hits. The single also peaked at number 83 on the Billboard Hot 100, becoming her first entry on that chart. Over the decade, Lynn would reach the Hot 100 three more times. "Coal Miner's Daughter" also charted on the RPM Country Singles chart in Canada, reaching the number one position as well. In 1971, the single was included on Lynn's studio album, also titled Coal Miner's Daughter. The song was the opening track on the album.

== Legacy ==
"Coal Miner's Daughter" has not only been considered one of Loretta Lynn's most significant songs, but has also been considered one of music's most significant recordings. In 1998, Loretta's 1970 version of "Coal Miner's Daughter" was inducted into the Grammy Hall of Fame. In 2001, the Recording Industry Association of America named it as one of their Songs of the Century. The song has also been ranked by other music agencies, including Rolling Stone, who ranked it on their list of the "100 Greatest Country Songs of All Time" at No. 42, and their list of the "Top 500 Greatest Songs of All Time" at No. 255. Country Music Television ranked the song on a similar list titled the "100 Greatest Songs of Country Music." In 2009, "Coal Miner's Daughter" was added by the Library of Congress to the National Recording Registry. In June 2026, CBS News included the song in its list of the 250 essential American songs of the past 250 years.

Cary O'Dell spoke of the song's significance in an essay about the song: "With this Decca release, Lynn not only delivered an instant classic, she also forever changed her image. Though already highly successful, up until this time, Lynn was most famous for her tough girl songs, musical warnings to lazy, unappreciative, floundering husbands and the women they cheat with...“Coal Miner’s Daughter” introduced audiences to a new, softer and more reflective Lynn."

The song has also been considered significant by other publications. This included Time magazine, which named it among its "100 All-Time Songs". The magazine called it the song to have a "purely Appalachian" style that "makes vivid musical pictures of Daddy’s job at the Van Lear Coal Mines, Mommy’s bleeding fingers at the washboard, the kids barefoot in summer and shod from a mail-order catalog in winter." "Coal Miner's Daughter" also became the title of Lynn's 2010 tribute album that was recorded by other artists. It was officially named, Coal Miner's Daughter: A Tribute to Loretta Lynn. Artists featured included The White Stripes, Reba McEntire and Paramore.

"Coal Miner's Daughter" would also serve as the inspiration and title for future works by Lynn. In 1976, her first autobiography was also titled Coal Miner's Daughter and helped introduce Lynn's music to newer generations. This was followed in 1980 by the biopic of the same name starring Sissy Spacek. The film became a critical and commercial success and received seven nominations at the 53rd Academy Awards including for the Best Picture, with Spacek winning Best Actress portraying Lynn.

== Track listing ==
7" vinyl single

- "Coal Miner's Daughter" – 3:00
- "The Man of the House" – 2:48

== Charts ==
Chart (1970)	Peak position
Canada Country Songs (RPM)	1
US Billboard Hot 100	83
US Hot Country Songs (Billboard)	1

== Cover versions ==
Several versions of "Coal Miner's Daughters" have been notably recorded by other artists and entertainers. The song was parodied as Cow Minder's Daughter by Laraine Newman, who portrayed the fictional east Indian singer "Govinda Lynn." The song was performed in a skit on season five of Saturday Night Live. In 1971, RCA Records country singer Norma Jean recorded a version of "Coal Miner's Daughter" for her self-titled studio album. Irish country performer Mary Duff recorded the track for her 2004 studio release, Just a Country Girl. Country artist Stella Parton (sister of Dolly Parton) recorded a cover version of the song for her 2010 studio album, American Coal. The song appeared as the tenth track on the album. Lynn re-recorded several times, notably in 2010 for a tribute album and in 2018 for her studio release called Wouldn't It Be Great.

=== Sissy Spacek version ===
"Coal Miner's Daughter"

Single by Sissy Spacek

from the album Coal Miner's Daughter
- B-side: "I'm a Honky Tonk Girl"
- Released: April 1980
- Recorded: December 1979
- Studio: Bradley's Barn
- Genre: Country
- Length: 3:00
- Label: MCA Records
- Songwriter: Loretta Lynn
- Producer: Owen Bradley

Sissy Spacek singles chronology
"Coal Miner's Daughter" (1980)	"Back in Baby's Arms" (1980)

In 1980, a version of "Coal Miner's Daughter" was recorded by American actress and singer Sissy Spacek for Lynn's 1980 biopic of the same name. Spacek portrayed Lynn in the film. Spacek learned to sing like Lynn by following her on tour for a year in the late 1970s. She also tried to imitate Lynn's speech patterns and singing style by visiting Lynn at her house. Together, the pair also performed on the Grand Ole Opry before the film's release. In addition, Spacek studied with Owen Bradley (Lynn's record producer) in order to further develop her character. Spacek recorded her version of "Coal Miner's Daughter" in December 1979. The recording session was produced by Bradley as well and was held at Bradley's Barn, the same studio where Lynn recorded the song ten years prior. Additional songs Spacek performed for the soundtrack were cut during the same session, such as "You Ain't Woman Enough (To Take My Man)," "Fist City" and "There He Goes."

In addition to Spacek recording her own version for the film, it was also released as a single. Spacek's version was released following the release of the official soundtrack. It was issued as a single by MCA Records in April 1980 and was issued as a 7" vinyl record. Included on the B-side was Spacek's version of Lynn's original 1960 hit, "I'm a Honky Tonk Girl." Spacek's version became a top-40 hit in the United States, reaching number 24 on the Billboard Hot Country Singles chart in 1980. Her version of the song was reviewed positively by Cub Koda of Allmusic, who also reviewed additional songs on the original soundtrack. "Sissy Spacek did a more than credible job of singing like Loretta Lynn in the movie, and this soundtrack proves it. From the "early" sides to the hits at the end, Spacek sings her heart out and actually varies her singing approach to sound more assured and professional on the "later" ones.

==== Track listing ====
7" vinyl single

- "Coal Miner's Daughter" – 3:00
- "I'm a Honky Tonk Girl" – 2:17

==== Weekly charts ====
Chart (1980)	Peak position
Canada Country Songs (RPM)	7
US Hot Country Songs (Billboard)	24

=== Loretta Lynn collaboration ===
"Coal Miner's Daughter"

Single by Loretta Lynn, Sheryl Crow and Miranda Lambert

from the album Coal Miner's Daughter: A Tribute to Loretta Lynn
- Released: October 4, 2010
- Studio: Cash Cabin Studio (Hendersonville, Tennessee)
- Genre: Contemporary Country
- Length: 3:11
- Label: Columbia
- Songwriter: Loretta Lynn
- Producers: John Carter Cash; Patsy Lynn

Loretta Lynn singles chronology
"Portland, Oregon" (2004)	"Coal Miner's Daughter" (2010)	"Everything It Takes" (2016)

Sheryl Crow singles chronology
"Sign Your Name" (2010)	"Coal Miner's Daughter" (2010)	"Easy" (2010)

Miranda Lambert singles chronology
"Only Prettier" (2010)	"Coal Miner's Daughter" (2010)	"Heart Like Mine" (2011)

Audio video
- "Coal Miner's Daughter (Feat. Loretta Lynn, Sheryl Crow and Miranda Lambert)" on YouTube

The song was notably re-recorded by Loretta Lynn in 2010 for an album dedicated to her entitled, Coal Miner's Daughter: A Tribute to Loretta Lynn. The new version featured vocals from singer-songwriter Sheryl Crow and country artist Miranda Lambert. Lynn spoke of the re-recording in 2010 and praised the collaboration with Crow and Lambert: "I love Miranda and Sheryl, and I really felt they both brought something different singing style wise to this song." Although other producers helped with the tribute album, only John Carter Cash and Patsy Lynn (Lynn's daughter) served as producer's on "Coal Miner's Daughter." Also featured in the song's personnel was Lynn's writing collaborator, Shawn Camp and Lynn's former producer, Randy Scruggs. The track was recorded at Cash Cabin Studio in Hendersonville, Tennessee. Crow and Lambert both added their vocals in later studio sessions.

Lynn's re-recording was given positive reviews. Holly Gleason of Lonestar Music Magazine praised Lynn's traditional approach when recording the song with Crow and Lambert. "Lynn can still show the kids how to do it: tossing her head back and going to the song’s center, demonstrating what a fiery, feisty country presence is," Gleason commented. Music and Musician's commented that the version of "Coal Miner's Daughter" was a collaboration with "younger admirers." Aryl Watson of Cover Me Songs stated that "Lambert and Crow willingly take a backseat on the chorus, letting Lynn tell the story her way."

The re-recording was issued as a single via Columbia Records on October 4, 2010. It was released as a digital download via iTunes and other downloading sites upon its original release. The single was released both to country radio stations and to college radio. According to Gary Overton of Sony Music Entertainment, Lynn called radio stations herself to help promote the song. When asked about the decision, Lynn replied, ""Well, why not?". The single entered the Billboard Hot Country Songs chart for one week on December 4, 2010, and peaked at number 55 on the survey. It was Lynn's first charting single since 2000's "Country in My Genes."

A music video was also filmed for the new single release. The video featured Crow and Lambert, along with Lynn at her home in Hurricane Mills, Tennessee. The music video was directed by Deaton-Flanigen. In November 2010, the trio performed "Coal Miner's Daughter" at the Country Music Association Awards ceremony.

==== Track listing ====
Music download

- "Coal Miner's Daughter" – 3:11

==== Weekly charts ====
Chart (2010)	Peak position
US Hot Country Songs (Billboard)	55

=== Loretta Lynn recitation ===
"Coal Miner's Daughter (Recitation)"

Single by Loretta Lynn

from the album Still Woman Enough
- Released: January 4, 2021
- Studio: Cash Cabin Studio
- Genre: Country
- Length: 2:07
- Label: Legacy
- Songwriter: Loretta Lynn
- Producers: John Carter Cash; Patsy Lynn Russell

Loretta Lynn singles chronology
"I Fall to Pieces" (2020)	"Coal Miner's Daughter (Recitation)" (2021)

Loretta Lynn notably re-recorded "Coal Miner's Daughter" again for her 2021 studio album, Still Woman Enough. The song and album were announced on the fiftieth anniversary of Lynn's 1970 studio album. The new version was recorded as a spoken word recitation. Although Lynn had previously cut the song in several styles, "Coal Miner's Daughter" had not been performed through speaking only. The song was recorded with minimal instrumentation at the Cash Cabin Recording Studio. The sessions were produced by John Carter Cash (Johnny Cash's son) and Patsy Lynn Russell (Lynn's daughter).

The recitation version of "Coal Miner's Daughter" was released as the lead single off Still Woman Enough in January 2021. The album is scheduled for official release on March 19, 2021, through Legacy Recordings. It will mark Lynn's first studio album since 2018's Wouldn't It Be Great. Lab.fm praised the recitation version of the song, calling it "a warm, poignant recitation of her signature lyrics." Lorie Hollabaugh of Music Row magazine called the recitation "emotional" in her announcement of her 2021 album.

A music video for "Coal Miner's Daughter" was directed by David McClister on site at Lynn's ranch in Hurricane Mills, Tennessee. The video was released the same day as the recitation single. The video also included footage taken from the replica of Lynn's childhood cabin in Butcher Hollow, Kentucky. Lynn reflected on the song and the video in a press statement: "It’s amazing how much has happened in the fifty years since ‘Coal Miner’s Daughter’ first came out and I'm extremely grateful to be given a part to play in the history of American music."

==== Track listing ====
Music download

- "Coal Miner's Daughter (Recitation)" – 2:07
