= Loretta Lynn's Greatest Hits =

Compilation album by Loretta Lynn
- Released: June 10, 1968
- Recorded: September 9, 1961–January 18, 1967
- Studio: Bradley Studios, Nashville, Tennessee; Columbia, Nashville, Tennessee; Bradley's Barn, Mt. Juliet, Tennessee
- Genre: Country
- Length: 26:06
- Label: Decca
- Producer: Owen Bradley

Loretta Lynn chronology
Here's Loretta Lynn (1968)	Loretta Lynn's Greatest Hits (1968)	Your Squaw Is on the Warpath (1969)

Loretta Lynn's Greatest Hits is a compilation album by American country music singer-songwriter Loretta Lynn. It was released on June 10, 1968, by Decca Records. The album is made up of Lynn's biggest hits from 1962 to 1967.

== Critical reception ==
Professional ratings
Review scores
Source	Rating
AllMusic	5/5 stars

The review in the June 22, 1968 issue of Billboard said, "A powerful package. Contains the biggest hits of this great artist. Included are "Don't Come Home a Drinkin'", "Dear Uncle Sam", "You Ain't Woman Enough" and others. Will move right up the charts."

Cashbox also published a review in the June 22 issue. The review said, "From a purely commercial standpoint, this collection of Loretta Lynn giants is destined for a powerhouse reaction from consumers. From the beginning of it all, "Success", to one of her more recent biggies, "If You're Not Gone Too Long", Loretta sings up her usual hurricane, and outdoes herself on a couple of monsters called "You Ain't Woman Enough" and "Don't Come Home a Drinkin'". This one may go through the roof."

== Commercial performance ==
The album peaked at No. 6 on the US Billboard Hot Country LP's chart. The album became Lynn's second album to receive a Gold certification by the RIAA, which is awarded to an album that has sold 500,000 copies or more.

== Track listing ==
Side one
No.	Title	Writer(s)	Recording date	Length
1.	"Don't Come Home a Drinkin' (With Lovin' on Your Mind)"	Loretta Lynn; Peggy Sue Wells	October 5, 1966	2:05
2.	"Before I'm Over You"	Betty Sue Perry	February 5, 1962	2:30
3.	"If You're Not Gone Too Long"	Wanda Ballman	January 18, 1967	2:36
4.	"Dear Uncle Sam"	Lynn	November 15, 1965	2:24
5.	"The Other Woman"	Perry	January 9, 1963	2:26
6.	"Wine, Women and Song"	Perry	February 26, 1964	2:02

Side two
No.	Title	Writer(s)	Recording date	Length
1.	"You Ain't Woman Enough"	Lynn	November 15, 1965	2:11
2.	"Blue Kentucky Girl"	Johnny Mullins	October 14, 1964	2:27
3.	"Success"	Mullins	September 8, 1961	2:36
4.	"The Home You're Tearin' Down"	Perry	March 4, 1965	2:44
5.	"Happy Birthday"	Ron Kitson	October 14, 1964	2:03

== Personnel ==
Adapted from the album liner notes and Decca recording session records.

- Willie Ackerman – drums
- Harold Bradley – electric guitar, electric bass guitar
- Owen Bradley – producer
- David Briggs – piano
- Cecil Brower – fiddle
- Hal Buksbaum – photography
- Floyd Cramer – piano
- Ray Edenton – acoustic guitar
- Buddy Harman – drums
- Don Helms – steel guitar
- Junior Huskey – bass
- Tommy Jackson – fiddle
- The Jordanaires – background vocals
- Jerry Kennedy – guitar
- Loretta Lynn – lead vocals
- Grady Martin – guitar, lead electric guitar
- Bob Moore – bass
- Harold Morrison – guitar
- Wayne Moss – guitar, electric guitar
- Jack Pruett – electric guitar
- Hal Rugg – steel guitar
- Johnny Russell – guitar
- Teddy Wilburn – guitar, liner notes
- Joe Zinkan – bass

== Charts ==
Chart (1968)	Peak position
US Hot Country Albums (Billboard)	6

== Certifications ==
Region	Certification	Certified units/sales
United States (RIAA)	Gold	500,000^{^}
^{^} Shipments figures based on certification alone.
