= Wouldn't It Be Great =

Studio album by Loretta Lynn
- Released: September 28, 2018
- Recorded: 2007–2017
- Studio: Cash Cabin Studio (Hendersonville, Tennessee); Loretta's Ranch (Hurricane Mills)
- Genre: Country
- Length: 36:20
- Label: Sony Legacy
- Producer: Patsy Lynn Russell; John Carter Cash

Loretta Lynn chronology
White Christmas Blue (2016)	Wouldn't It Be Great (2018)	Still Woman Enough (2021)

Singles from Wouldn't It Be Great
- 1. "Wouldn't It Be Great?" Released: August 22, 2018; 2. "Ruby's Stool" Released: September 12, 2018; 3. "Ain’t No Time to Go" Released: September 26, 2018

Professional ratings
Review scores
Source	Rating
AllMusic	3.5/5 stars
Newsday	3.5/4 stars

Wouldn't It Be Great is the forty-fifth solo studio album by American country music singer-songwriter Loretta Lynn. It was released by Sony Legacy on September 28, 2018. The album is produced by Lynn's daughter Patsy Lynn Russell and John Carter Cash, the son of Johnny Cash and June Carter Cash.

The album was recorded at Cash Cabin Studio in Hendersonville, Tennessee, following 2016's Full Circle and White Christmas Blue. The album is a mixture of new songs and new versions of songs Lynn has previously recorded.

== Background ==
The album was originally scheduled to be released on August 18, 2017. On July 12, 2017, it was announced that the release date was being postponed until 2018 and all remaining tour dates for 2017 were being cancelled while Lynn recovered from the stroke she suffered in May 2017. Lynn stated that she wished to postpone the release date "because this record is so special for me. It deserves me at my best."

Crystal Gayle, Lynn's sister, revealed in an Instagram post on January 8, 2018, that Lynn had fallen in her home on New Year's Day and fractured her hip. This news meant continued delays for the album, which had been rumored to be scheduled for a spring release.

Lynn revealed in a Facebook post on July 11, 2018, that she had returned to work, shooting a music video for the album on July 10 at her ranch in Hurricane Mills, Tennessee.

On August 22, 2018, Lynn announced that the album would be released on September 28, 2018, saying, "Before my stroke last year I had been working hard on a new album and was so excited about it. This new record means so much to me, but this last year I had to focus on my health and decided to hold up the release. It's been a tough year, but I'm feelin' good now and look forward to it comin' out. It was really important to me to be a part of it being released and I'm excited to celebrate it with y'all. I hope y'all love it."

=== Previous recordings ===
Six songs from the album are new versions of songs previously recorded by Lynn:

- "Wouldn't It Be Great?", was previously recorded by Lynn on her 1985 album, Just a Woman, and again with Dolly Parton and Tammy Wynette for their 1993 album, Honky Tonk Angels.
- "God Makes No Mistakes" was previously recorded by Lynn on her 2004 album, Van Lear Rose.
- "My Angel Mother" was previously recorded by Lynn in 1960 for Zero Records, this recording was released by Vocalion Records on 1968's Here's Loretta Lynn.
- "Don't Come Home a Drinkin'" was previously recorded by Lynn on her 1967 album of the same name.
- "Darkest Day" was previously recorded by Lynn in 1960 as her third single for Zero Records, and on her 1966 album, You Ain't Woman Enough.
- "Coal Miner's Daughter" was previously recorded by Lynn on her 1971 album of the same name, and again with Miranda Lambert and Sheryl Crow for the album Coal Miner's Daughter: A Tribute to Loretta Lynn.

== Promotion ==
The album's lead single, "Wouldn't It Be Great?", was released on August 22, 2018, along with the album's pre-order.

The second single from the album, "Ruby's Stool", premiered on Parade.com on September 12, 2018, and was subsequently made available for streaming and digital download.

The album became available for streaming exclusively on NPR Music’s website as a part of their First Listen series on September 20, 2018.

"Ain't No Time to Go" was released as the album's third single on September 26, 2018. The single's music video, directed by Dave McClister, premiered the same day on CMT's website and was later uploaded to Lynn's official Vevo channel.

== Commercial performance ==
Wouldn't It Be Great debuted and peaked at No. 8 on the US Billboard Top Country Albums chart dated October 13, 2018, based on 9,000 equivalent album units. It sold a further 3,200 copies the following week and charted at No. 43. The album also charted on the US Billboard 200 chart at No. 78 and the US Billboard Top Americana/Folk Albums chart at No. 2. The album has sold 26,000 copies in the United States as of April 2019.

== Track listing ==
No.	Title	Writer(s)	Length
1.	"Wouldn't It Be Great?"	Loretta Lynn	3:24
2.	"Ruby's Stool"	Lynn; Shawn Camp	2:53
3.	"I'm Dying for Someone to Live For"	Lynn; Camp	2:30
4.	"Another Bridge to Burn"	Lynn; Lola Jean Dillon	3:47
5.	"Ain't No Time to Go"	Lynn; Patsy Lynn Russell	2:31
6.	"God Makes No Mistakes"	Lynn	3:00
7.	"These Ole Blues"	Lynn; Russell	2:52
8.	"My Angel Mother"	Lynn	1:56
9.	"Don't Come Home a Drinkin'"	Lynn; Peggy Sue Wells	2:12
10.	"The Big Man"	Lynn; Camp	2:45
11.	"Lulie Vars"	Traditional, arr. by Lynn	2:49
12.	"Darkest Day"	Lynn	2:30
13.	"Coal Miner's Daughter"	Lynn	3:11
Total length:			36:20

== Personnel ==
Adapted from the album liner notes.

- Ronnie Bowman – backing vocals
- Mike Bub – upright bass
- Sam Bush – fiddle
- Trey Call – second engineer, research, production assistant
- Shawn Camp – acoustic guitar, backing vocals, mandolin
- John Carter Cash – producer, liner notes
- Charlie Chadwick – cello
- Dennis Crouch – upright bass
- Richard Dodd – mastering
- Mark Fain – upright bass
- Paul Franklin – steel guitar
- Lloyd Green – steel guitar
- Frank Harkins – art direction, art design
- Tony Harrell – piano
- Jamie Hartford – electric guitar, mandolin
- Byron House – upright bass
- John Jackson – A&R
- Rick Lonow – drums
- Loretta Lynn – lead vocals, backing vocals
- David McClister – photography
- Ronnie McCoury – mandolin
- Pat McLaughlin – mandolin, acoustic guitar
- Larry Perkins – banjo
- John Randall – backing vocals
- Patsy Lynn Russell – producer
- Randy Scruggs – acoustic guitar
- Bryan Sutton – banjo, acoustic guitar
- Chuck Turner – engineering, mixing
- Robby Turner – dobro, steel guitar
- Jeff White – acoustic guitar
- Laura Weber White – acoustic guitar, fiddle

== Charts ==
Chart (2018)	Peak position
US Billboard 200	78
US Top Country Albums (Billboard)	8
US Top Americana/Folk Albums (Billboard)	2
