= Anchored in Love: A Tribute to June Carter Cash =

Compilation album by Various Artists
- Released: June 19, 2007
- Genre: Country
- Length: 42:20
- Label: Dualtone
- Producer: John Carter Cash

Professional ratings
Review scores
Source	Rating
Allmusic	4/5 stars

Anchored in Love: A Tribute to June Carter Cash is a tribute album released in 2007 featuring various country music artists performing songs performed in any part by June Carter Cash including songs with Johnny Cash and the Carter Family, Dale Jett and Laura Cash. The album was produced by Johnny and June's only son, John Carter Cash.

== Track listing ==
Anchored in Love: A Tribute to June Carter Cash
No.	Title	Music	Length
1.	"If I Were a Carpenter"	Sheryl Crow & Willie Nelson	3:09
2.	"Jackson"	Carlene Carter & Ronnie Dunn	3:25
3.	"Wildwood Flower"	Loretta Lynn	4:40
4.	"Far Side Banks of Jordan"	Patty Loveless & Kris Kristofferson	2:51
5.	"Keep on the Sunny Side"	Brad Paisley	4:04
6.	"Wings of Angels"	Rosanne Cash	3:20
7.	"Ring of Fire"	Elvis Costello	3:34
8.	"Road to Kaintuck"	Billy Bob Thornton & The Peasall Sisters	2:44
9.	"Big Yellow Peaches"	Grey DeLisle	2:48
10.	"Kneeling Drunkard's Plea"	Billy Joe Shaver	3:14
11.	"Will the Circle Be Unbroken"	Ralph Stanley	4:31
12.	"Song to John"	Emmylou Harris	4:00

== Chart performance ==
Chart (2007)	Peak position
U.S. Billboard Top Country Albums	74
