= Who Says God Is Dead! =

Studio album by Loretta Lynn
- Released: January 29, 1968
- Recorded: June 28–December 19, 1967
- Studio: Bradley's Barn, Mount Juliet, Tennessee
- Genre: Gospel; country
- Length: 27:02
- Label: Decca
- Producer: Owen Bradley

Loretta Lynn chronology
Singin' with Feelin' (1968)	Who Says God Is Dead! (1968)	Fist City (1968)

Who Says God Is Dead! is the eleventh solo studio album and second Gospel album by American country music singer-songwriter Loretta Lynn. It was released on January 29, 1968, by Decca Records.

== Critical reception ==
Professional ratings
Review scores
Source	Rating
AllMusic	4/5 stars

In the issue dated February 17, 1968, Billboard published a review of the album, saying, "The darling of the country music field has produced another beautiful religious LP. Her understanding and perception on "Who Says God Is Dead" is convincing. She's also great on "I Believe", "In the Garden", and "The Old Rugged Cross"."

Cashbox published a review in the February 10, 1968 issue that said, "Consistently riding high as country's champion gal disk seller, Loretta Lynn offers another collection of inspirational tunes done up with her inimitable styling. Country 'soul' is the keynote in this set as Loretta combines hymn-like spirituals ("I Believe") with rousing gospel numbers ("He's Got the Whole World in His Hands"), all of which adds up to one heck of a catalog piece. No doubt about the saleability of this one."

== Commercial performance ==
There were no singles released from the album, so initial sales of the album were low. The album peaked at No. 44 on the US Billboard Hot Country LPs chart, Lynn's lowest position on the chart until the mid-1980s.

== Recording ==
Recording sessions for the album began on June 28, 1967, at Bradley's Barn studio in Mount Juliet, Tennessee. Two additional sessions followed on December 18 and 19.

== Track listing ==
Side one
No.	Title	Writer(s)	Recording date	Length
1.	"Who Says God Is Dead!"	Loretta Lynn	June 28, 1967	2:06
2.	"I Believe"	Ervin Drake; Irvin Graham; Jimmy Shirl; Al Stillman	December 19, 1967	2:25
3.	"Standing Room Only"	Lynn; Frances Heighton	December 18, 1967	2:57
4.	"The Old Rugged Cross"	George Bennard	June 28, 1967	2:36
5.	"Harp with Golden Strings"	Jimmie Keith; Mrs. Mac McCarty	December 18, 1967	2:08
6.	"If You Miss Heaven (You'll Miss It All)"	Dale Fox	December 18, 1967	2:40

Side two
No.	Title	Writer(s)	Recording date	Length
1.	"I'm a Gettin' Ready to Go"	Lynn	June 28, 1967	1:56
2.	"In the Garden"	C. Austin Miles	June 28, 1967	2:36
3.	"Ten Thousand Angels"	Ray Overholt	December 19, 1967	2:40
4.	"He's Got the Whole World in His Hands"	Traditional	December 19, 1967	2:28
5.	"Mama, Why?" (feat. Ernest Ray Lynn)	Lynn	December 18, 1967	2:30

== Personnel ==
Adapted from the album liner notes and Decca recording session records.

- The Anita Kerr Singers – background vocals
- Owen Bradley – producer
- Floyd Cramer – piano
- Larry Estes – drums
- Lloyd Green – steel guitar
- Junior Huskey – bass
- The Jordanaires – background vocals
- Ernest Ray Lynn – duet vocals on "Mama, Why?"
- Loretta Lynn – lead vocals
- Grady Martin – lead electric guitar
- Billy Sanford – guitar
- Jerry Stembridge – guitar

== Charts ==
Chart (1968)	Peak position
US Hot Country Albums (Billboard)	44
