= Here's Loretta Lynn =

Compilation album by Loretta Lynn
- Released: April 22, 1968
- Recorded: March 1960
- Studio: Western Recorders, Hollywood, California
- Genre: Country
- Length: 22:51
- Label: Vocalion
- Producer: Don Grashey

Loretta Lynn chronology
Fist City (1968)	Here's Loretta Lynn (1968)	Loretta Lynn's Greatest Hits (1968)

Singles from Here's Loretta Lynn
- 1. "Heartaches Meet Mr. Blues" Released: August 1960; 2. "The Darkest Day" Released: May 1961

Here's Loretta Lynn is a compilation album by American country music singer-songwriter Loretta Lynn. It was released on April 22, 1968, by Vocalion Records.

== Background ==
The album features recordings Lynn made for Zero Records in 1960, prior to signing with Decca Records. The only songs Lynn recorded for Zero Records that are not included on this album are her debut single,"I'm a Honky Tonk Girl", and "Darlin' Don't", which remains unreleased.

Lynn would later re-record "The Darkest Day" for inclusion on 1966's You Ain't Woman Enough. She would re-record it once again, along with "My Angel Mother", for 2018's Wouldn't It Be Great. "My Life Story" was retitled "Story of My Life" and re-recorded with updated lyrics for 2004's Van Lear Rose.

== Critical reception ==
Professional ratings
Review scores
Source	Rating
AllMusic	4/5 stars

The review in the May 4, 1968, issue of Billboard magazine said the album is "A must have for all Loretta Lynn fans—a collection of her early material before she actually joined Decca Records. It's amazing how good she was, even then! You'll enjoy "The Darkest Day" and "Blue Steel"."

Cashbox also published a review in their May 4 issue which said, "Originally waxed for the Canadian-based Zero label, this LP contains the only early Loretta Lynn cuts that were not recorded for Decca. Decca has bought the cuts and now owns and has released everything Loretta has recorded. Fans who have all of Loretta's other Decca recordings can make their collection complete by buying this set, which Decca has issued on its economy-priced Vocalion label. All the songs are Loretta's own compositions, and she sings them in fine style."

In a review for AllMusic, Eugene Chadbourne said of the album, "The songs are really very good, rich with detail and, needless to say, convincing in emotion."

== Commercial performance ==
The album did not appear on any music charts.

The first single, "Heartaches Meet Mr. Blues", was released in August 1960 and did not chart. The second single, "The Darkest Day", was released in May 1961 and also did not chart.

== Track listing ==
All tracks are written by Loretta Lynn. Lynn states in her 1976 memoir that "New Rainbow" was co-written by her husband's father, Oliver Vanetta "Red" Lynn, Sr.

Side one
No.	Title	Original release	Length
1.	"Blue Steel"	Previously unreleased	2:05
2.	"My Love"	Previously unreleased	1:58
3.	"Whispering Sea"	"I'm a Honky Tonk Girl" B-side (1960)	2:13
4.	"New Rainbow"	"Heartaches Meet Mr. Blues" B-side (1960)	2:47
5.	"Stop"	Previously unreleased	2:16

Side two
No.	Title	Original release	Length
1.	"Heartaches Meet Mr. Blues"	Single A-side (1960)	2:04
2.	"The Darkest Day"	Single A-side (1961)	2:28
3.	"My Angel Mother"	Previously unreleased	2:31
4.	"My Life Story"	Previously unreleased	2:24
5.	"Gonna Pack Up My Troubles"	"The Darkest Day" B-side (1961)	2:05

== Personnel ==
Adapted from the album liner notes and recording session records.

- Muddy Berry – drums
- Hal Buksbaum – photography
- Don Grashey - producer
- Harold Hensley – fiddle
- Roy Lanham – guitar
- Loretta Lynn – lead vocals
- Speedy West – steel
- Al Williams – bass
