= Loretta (album) =

Studio album by Loretta Lynn
- Released: March 3, 1980
- Recorded: March–October 1979
- Studio: Bradley's Barn, Mount Juliet, Tennessee
- Genre: Country, urban cowboy
- Length: 30:12
- Label: MCA
- Producer: Owen Bradley

Loretta Lynn chronology
Diamond Duet (1979)	Loretta (1980)	Lookin' Good (1980)

Singles from Loretta
- 1. "I've Got a Picture of Us on My Mind" Released: September 1979; 2. "Pregnant Again" Released: January 1980; 3. "Naked in the Rain" Released: May 1980

Loretta is the thirty-second solo studio album by American country music singer-songwriter Loretta Lynn. The album was released on March 3, 1980, by MCA Records.

== Commercial performance ==
The album peaked at No. 24 on the Billboard Top Country Albums chart. The album's first single, "I've Got a Picture of Us on My Mind", peaked at No. 5 on the Billboard Hot Country Songs chart. The second single, "Pregnant Again", peaked at No. 35, and the third single, "Naked in the Rain", peaked at No. 30.

== Track listing ==
Side one
No.	Title	Writer(s)	Length
1.	"I've Got a Picture of Us on My Mind"	Bobby Harden	2:44
2.	"Naked in the Rain"	Buddy Cannon, Kenny Starr	2:39
3.	"Sweet, Sweet Daddy"	Bobby Harden	2:22
4.	"It's Too Late to Love Me Now"	Gene Dobbins, Johnny Wilson, Rory Bourke	3:28
5.	"You're a Cross I Can't Bear"	Hank Riddle	3:03

Side two
No.	Title	Writer(s)	Length
1.	"I've Been Lonely So Long"	Bruce Frazier, Joey Scarbury	3:10
2.	"It Wasn't God Who Made Honky Tonk Angels"	J.D. Miller	2:52
3.	"I Should Be Over You By Now"	Theresa Beaty	3:26
4.	"The Fool Wouldn't Listen"	Jerri Kelly	2:53
5.	"Pregnant Again"	Lee Pockriss, Marl Sameth	3:35

== Personnel ==
Adapted from album liner notes.

- Harold Bradley – bass
- Owen Bradley – producer
- James Caddell – backing vocals
- Jerry Carrigan – drums
- Gene Chrisman – drums
- John Christopher – guitar
- Jean Chapman – backing vocals
- Ray Edenton – guitar
- Buddy Harman – drums
- Mike Leech – bass
- Hargus "Pig" Robbins – piano
- Hal Rugg – steel guitar
- Joey Scarbury – backing vocals
- Joan Sliwin – backing vocals
- Henry Strzelecki – electric bass
- Pete Wade – guitar
- Bobby Wood – piano
- Reggie Young – guitar

== Chart positions ==
Album – Billboard (North America)

Year	Chart	Peak position
1980	Country Albums	24

Singles – Billboard (North America)

Year	Single	Chart	Peak position
1979	"I've Got a Picture of Us on My Mind"	Country Singles	5
1980	"Pregnant Again"	Country Singles	35
1980	"Naked in the Rain"	Country Singles	30
