= Making More Memories =

Studio album by Loretta Lynn
- Released: February 8, 1994
- Recorded: 1993; Nashville, TN
- Genre: Country
- Length: 30:47
- Label: Nashville Sound
- Producer: Kenny Starr

Loretta Lynn chronology
Honky Tonk Angels (1993)	Making More Memories (1994)	All Time Gospel Favorites (1997)

Making More Memories is the thirty-ninth solo studio album by American country music singer-songwriter Loretta Lynn. It was released on February 8, 1994, through Nashville Sound. It was sold exclusively for a limited time at Loretta Lynn's Ranch, Ernest Tubb Record Stores, and at Lynn's live performances. It was also available for mail order via the Loretta Lynn Fan Club.

== Background ==
Lynn only promoted the album once, during a live show on TNN on May 18, 1994. The album sold approximately 2,000 copies. A music video for "We Need to Make More Memories" was filmed on location at Lynn's home in Hurricane Mills, Tennessee. This was Lynn's first solo music video and features her entire immediate family.

Lynn dedicated the album to her husband, Doolittle. The album's cover shows Lynn with her granddaughter, Megan.

== Track listing ==
No.	Title	Writer(s)	Length
1.	"We Need to Make More Memories"	Kenny Starr, Gene Dunlap	3:38
2.	"Until I Met You"	Hank Riddle	3:33
3.	"God Bless the Children"	Barbara Clarkson	3:00
4.	"Love Is the Foundation"	William C. Hall	2:41
5.	"Ships Still Come In"	Loretta Lynn, Lorene Allen	3:03
6.	"One Day (Let's Take the Time)"	Kenny Starr, Gene Dunlap	3:17
7.	"Brand New Ray of Sunshine"	William C. Hall	2:50
8.	"What Eyes You're Looking Through"	Loretta Lynn, Kenny Starr	2:43
9.	"You Want Me to Walk on Water"	Larry Alderman, Janet McLaughlin	3:10
10.	"Jesus Rocks Me"	Kenny Starr	2:58
Total length:			30:47
