= God Bless America Again =

Studio album by Loretta Lynn
- Released: June 5, 1972
- Recorded: April 8–August 12, 1970
- Studio: Bradley's Barn, Mount Juliet, Tennessee
- Genre: Country; Gospel
- Label: Decca
- Producer: Owen Bradley

Loretta Lynn chronology
Alone with You (1972)	God Bless America Again (1972)	Here I Am Again (1972)

God Bless America Again is the twentieth solo studio album and third gospel album by American country music singer-songwriter Loretta Lynn. It was released on June 5, 1972, by Decca Records. This was Lynn's last album of religious material for 25 years. Her next gospel album would be 1997's All Time Gospel Favorites.

The title song was cowritten by Bobby Bare and has led some to mislabel this release as a collection of patriotic songs. Largely consisting of new material, the album also includes a few well-known songs, including "Softly and Tenderly", "Just a Closer Walk with Thee", “Just a Little Talk with Jesus”, “I Feel Like Traveling On“ and "If God Is Dead (Who's That Living in My Soul)". Lynn wrote two songs for the album, "Working for the Lord" and "I Pray My Way Out of Trouble".

== Critical reception ==
Professional ratings
Review scores
Source	Rating
Allmusic	2/5 stars

Billboard published a review in the July 1, 1972 issue that said, "With material that proves show stoppers in her concert appearances, Miss Lynn has a powerful sales item in these strong performances. Among the top cuts are the title tune as well as "Working for the Lord", "If God Is Dead", "I Feel Like Traveling On", and "I Pray My Way Out of Trouble"."

In the June 17 issue, Cashbox published a review saying, "America was truly blessed with new hope and resources at the time that "God Bless America" was written, and if this country ever needed a blessing again, it’s here and now. Most fortunately, the blessing bestowed upon us with this album is Loretta Lynn’s pure and true country talent, delivering, eleven songs revolving around the theme of our proud American heritage and its future. Listen to "Six Feet of Sod" and "Livin' in God's Country" and watch the Stars and Stripes wave in time to the music."

== Commercial performance ==
The album peaked at No. 7 on the Billboard Hot Country LP's chart.

== Recording ==
Recording sessions for the album took place two years before the album was released. The first session was on April 8, 1970, at Bradley's Barn in Mount Juliet, Tennessee. Two additional sessions followed on July 15 and August 12.

== Track listing ==
Side one
No.	Title	Writer(s)	Recording date	Length
1.	"May God Bless America Again" (feat. Conway Twitty)	Bobby Bare; Boyce Hawkins	July 15, 1970	2:35
2.	"Just a Closer Walk with Thee"	Traditional	April 8, 1970	3:08
3.	"Six Feet of Sod"	Betty Sue Perry	August 12, 1970	2:20
4.	"I Feel Like Traveling On"	James D. Vaughn	August 12, 1970	2:31
5.	"Gethsemane"	B.L. Smith; W.B. Waldrop	August 12, 1970	2:59
6.	"Softly and Tenderly"	Will L. Thompson	August 12, 1970	3:11

Side one
No.	Title	Writer(s)	Recording date	Length
1.	"Working for the Lord"	Loretta Lynn	July 15, 1970	2:15
2.	"If God Is Dead (Who's That Living in My Soul)"	Lawrence Reynolds	April 8, 1970	2:35
3.	"I Pray My Way Out of Trouble"	Lynn; Teddy Wilburn	April 8, 1970	2:53
4.	"Just a Little Talk with Jesus"	Cleavant Derricks	August 12, 1970	2:20
5.	"Living in God's Country"	Don Helms; Doyle Wilburn; T. Wilburn	July 15, 1970	2:30

== Personnel ==
Adapted from the album liner notes and Decca recording session records.

- Harold Bradley – bass guitar, electric bass guitar
- Owen Bradley – producer
- Ray Edenton – guitar
- Buddy Harman – drums
- Junior Huskey – bass
- Darrell Johnson – mastering
- The Jordanaires – background vocals
- Loretta Lynn – lead vocals
- Oliver Lynn – liner notes
- Grady Martin – guitar
- Hargus Robbins – piano
- Hal Rugg – steel guitar, dobro
- Conway Twitty – recitation on "God Bless America Again"
- Pete Wade – guitar

== Charts ==
Chart (1972)	Peak position
US Hot Country LPs (Billboard)	7
