= I Wanna Be Free (Loretta Lynn song) =

Single by Loretta Lynn

from the album I Wanna Be Free
- B-side: "If You Never Love Again"
- Released: February 1971
- Genre: Country
- Label: Decca
- Songwriter: Loretta Lynn
- Producer: Owen Bradley

Loretta Lynn singles chronology
"Coal Miner's Daughter" (1970)	"I Wanna Be Free" (1971)	"You're Lookin' at Country" (1971)

"I Wanna Be Free" is a single by American country music artist Loretta Lynn. Released in February 1971, it was the first single from her album I Wanna Be Free. The song peaked at number 3 on the Billboard Hot Country Singles chart. It also reached number 1 on the RPM Country Tracks chart in Canada. She rerecorded "I Wanna Be Free" for her album Still Woman Enough (album), released on March 19, 2021.

Lynn allowed PETA to use this song in a public service campaign to discourage the chaining of dogs outdoors in the cold.

== Chart performance ==
Chart (1971)	Peak position
U.S. Billboard Hot Country Singles	3
U.S. Billboard Hot 100	94
Canadian RPM Country Tracks	1
