= White Christmas Blue =

Studio album by Loretta Lynn
- Released: October 7, 2016
- Recorded: 2007–2016
- Studio: Cash Cabin Studio, Hendersonville, TN
- Genre: Christmas, country, Americana
- Label: Sony Legacy
- Producer: Patsy Lynn Russell, John Carter Cash

Loretta Lynn chronology
Full Circle (2016)	White Christmas Blue (2016)	Wouldn't It Be Great (2018)

Singles from White Christmas Blue
- 1. "Country Christmas" Released: December 14, 2016

White Christmas Blue is the forty-fourth solo studio album and second Christmas album by American country music singer-songwriter Loretta Lynn. It was released on October 7, 2016, by Sony Legacy. The album is produced by Lynn's daughter, Patsy Lynn Russell, and John Carter Cash, the son of Johnny Cash and June Carter Cash.

== Background ==
White Christmas Blue is Lynn’s first Christmas album in five decades, since her 1966 album Country Christmas. The album is part of the "Cash Cabin Recordings", an extensive library of new music, overseen by producers Patsy Lynn Russell and John Carter Cash, that has been Lynn’s primary artistic focus in recent years. Six tracks on the album - "Country Christmas", "Away in a Manger", "Blue Christmas", "To Heck with Ole Santa Claus", "Frosty the Snowman" and "White Christmas" - were previously recorded by Lynn for her first Christmas album, Country Christmas.

== Critical reception ==
White Christmas Blue was met with generally favorable critical reception. Giving the album 7 out of 10 stars, John Paul of PopMatters said, “There’s a warmth and intimacy to Lynn’s performances of these Christmas standards. By elegantly tapping into each, Lynn…provides fans with a collection that can be returned to time and again with the same heart-warming familiarity of faded photographs and video images of Christmases past.” Hal Horowitz from American Songwriter gave the album 3.5 out of 5 stars saying that “Lynn, now in her mid-80s, is also in remarkably spry voice. You never feel she’s going through the motions, even on the most overdone classics.” Walter Tunis, writing for the Lexington Herald-Leader gave a positive review, saying that “Few artists can draw upon an esteemed artistic heritage to such as unassuming degree as Loretta Lynn does on the title track to her new White Christmas Blue album."

== Commercial performance ==
The album debuted at No. 35 on the Billboard Top Country Albums chart, selling 1,800 copies in its first week. The album reached its peak position of No. 26 on the Billboard Top Country Albums chart dated December 24, 2016, selling 4,200 copies. As of September 2017, the album has sold 29,400 copies.

== Track listing ==
No.	Title	Writer(s)	Length
1.	"White Christmas Blue"	Loretta Lynn, Shawn Camp	2:48
2.	"Country Christmas"	Lynn	2:24
3.	"Winter Wonderland"	Irving Berlin, Felix Bernard, Richard B. Smith	2:25
4.	"Away in a Manger"	Traditional	2:51
5.	"Blue Christmas"	Jay W. Johnson, Billy Hayes	2:52
6.	"To Heck with Ole Santa Claus"	Lynn	2:15
7.	"Frosty the Snowman"	Steve Nelson, Walter E. Rollins	2:03
8.	"O Come, All Ye Faithful"	Traditional	3:32
9.	"Jingle Bells"	Traditional	2:47
10.	"White Christmas"	Berlin	2:56
11.	"Silent Night"	Traditional	3:42
12.	"'Twas the Night Before Christmas"	Traditional	3:06

== Personnel ==
- Ronnie Bowman - backing vocals
- Mike Bub - upright bass
- Shawn Camp - acoustic guitar, backing vocals
- Matt Combs - fiddle, mandolin
- Dennis Crouch - upright bass
- Paul Franklin - steel guitar
- Tony Harrell - fiddle, piano
- Jamie Hartford - baritone guitar, electric guitar, mandolin
- Doug Jernigan - steel guitar
- Rick Lonow - drums
- Suzi Ragsdale - backing vocals
- John Randall - backing vocals
- Chris Scruggs - acoustic guitar
- Randy Scruggs - acoustic guitar
- Bryan Sutton - acoustic guitar
- Laura Weber - fiddle, acoustic guitar
- Mark Winchester - bass

== Charts ==
Chart (2016)	Peak position
US Top Country Albums (Billboard)	26
US Top Holiday Albums (Billboard)	2
