= Full Circle (Loretta Lynn album) =

Studio album by Loretta Lynn
- Released: March 4, 2016
- Recorded: 2007–2015
- Studio: Cash Cabin Studio (Hendersonville, Tennessee)
- Genres: Country, Americana, country folk
- Length: 38:49
- Label: Sony Legacy
- Producers: Patsy Lynn Russell, John Carter Cash

Loretta Lynn chronology
Van Lear Rose (2004)	Full Circle (2016)	White Christmas Blue (2016)

Singles from Full Circle
- 1. "Everything It Takes" Released: January 14, 2016; 2. "Who's Gonna Miss Me?" Released: February 4, 2016; 3. "Everybody Wants to Go to Heaven" Released: February 16, 2016; 4. "Lay Me Down" Released: March 23, 2016

Full Circle is the forty-third solo studio album by American country music singer-songwriter Loretta Lynn. It was released on March 4, 2016, by Sony Legacy. It was produced by Lynn's daughter, Patsy Lynn Russell, and John Carter Cash, the son of Johnny Cash and June Carter Cash. The album became Lynn's 40th album to reach the top ten of the US Billboard Top Country Albums chart and her career peak on the US Billboard 200, debuting at number 19. The album received a nomination for Best Country Album at the 59th Annual Grammy Awards.

== Background ==
Recorded at Cash Cabin Studio in Hendersonville, Tennessee, the album was Lynn's first new studio recording in 12 years. The album is a mixture of recordings inspired by Appalachian folk songs Lynn learned as a child and newer versions of past hits, and includes duets with Elvis Costello and Willie Nelson.

=== Previous recordings ===
Four songs on the album had previously been recorded by Lynn:

- "Whispering Sea" was previously recorded for Zero Records in 1960 as the B-side of her first single, "I'm a Honky Tonk Girl".
- "Secret Love" had been previously recorded for her 1967 album Singin' with Feelin'.
- "Everybody Wants to Go to Heaven" was previously recorded for her 1965 album Hymns.
- "Fist City" was previously recorded for her 1968 album of the same name.

== Promotion ==
The album's first single, "Everything It Takes", premiered on Rolling Stone's website on January 14, 2016. It was released for digital download the following day, January 15.

On February 4, 2016, Pitchfork premiered the second single, "Who's Gonna Miss Me?", on their website. It was made available for digital download on February 5.

An updated version of Lynn's 1965 song, "Everybody Wants to Go to Heaven", was released as the third single from the album. It was premiered by Time magazine via their website on February 16, 2016. On February 17 the single was made available for digital download.

The album's fourth and final single, "Lay Me Down", was written by Mark Marchetti, husband of Lynn's daughter, Peggy. It was released as a single on March 23, 2016. A music video was released on Lynn's VEVO channel the same day.

== Critical reception ==
Professional ratings
Aggregate scores
Source	Rating
Metacritic	84/100
Review scores
Source	Rating
AllMusic	4/5 stars
American Songwriter	4.5/5 stars
The Austin Chronicle	4/5 stars
Country Weekly	A
The Observer	4/5 stars
Pitchfork	8.0/10
PopMatters	8/10
Record Collector	5/5 stars
Rolling Stone	4/5 stars
Spin	8/10

Full Circle was released to strong reviews and near universal acclaim. It received a rating of 84 at Metacritic.com to date. Country Weekly called the album "a wonderful and welcome piece of work, 14 solid songs that shift easily from Appalachian mountain soul to pure country and even spiritual fare. Plus, Loretta has simply never sounded better." Pitchfork wrote "She makes a grab-bag late-late-career album feel not only emotionally grounded, but like a powerful choice." Houston Press's positive review writes "For an artist who has been so incredibly prolific, it's statistically improbable that, at 83 years old, Lynn would be recording some of the best music of her career." Spin opined that it was "a mandatory look back at one of country music's most essential artists." In Vice, Robert Christgau named "Everybody Wants to Go to Heaven" and "Wine Into Water" as highlights while summing the album up as "remakes that never seem redundant from an 83-year-old who's lived clean but never been a prig about it".

== Commercial performance ==
The album debuted at No. 4 on the Top Country Albums chart, the 40th top 10 on the chart for Lynn, selling 20,000 in its release week. It also debuted at No. 19 on the Billboard 200, the highest in her career on that chart. The recording has sold 75,300 U. S. copies as of September 2017.

== Track listing ==
No.	Title	Writer(s)	Length
1.	"Whispering Sea Introduction"	Loretta Lynn	0:55
2.	"Whispering Sea"	Loretta Lynn	2:16
3.	"Secret Love"	Sammy Fain, Paul Francis Webster	3:20
4.	"Who's Gonna Miss Me?"	Loretta Lynn, Lola Jean Dillon	2:44
5.	"Black Jack David"	A. P. Carter	2:09
6.	"Everybody Wants to Go to Heaven"	Loretta Lynn	2:53
7.	"Always on My Mind"	Wayne Carson, Johnny Christopher, Mark James	3:27
8.	"Wine Into Water"	T. Graham Brown, Bruce Burch, Ted Hewitt	3:21
9.	"In the Pines"	Unknown	3:07
10.	"Band of Gold"	Bob Musel, Jack Taylor	2:52
11.	"Fist City"	Loretta Lynn	2:16
12.	"I Never Will Marry"	A. P. Carter	3:37
13.	"Everything It Takes" (duet with Elvis Costello)	Loretta Lynn, Todd Snider	3:01
14.	"Lay Me Down" (duet with Willie Nelson)	Mark Marchetti	2:50
Total length:			38:49

== Personnel ==
- Ronnie Bowman - backing vocals
- Mike Bub - upright bass
- Sam Bush - mandolin
- Shawn Camp - acoustic guitar, mandolin
- Laura Cash - acoustic guitar
- Elvis Costello - duet vocals on "Everything it Takes"
- Dennis Crouch - bass guitar, upright bass
- Mark Fain - upright bass
- Paul Franklin - pedal steel guitar
- Tony Harrell - piano
- Jamie Hartford - electric guitar
- Rick Lonow - drums
- Loretta Lynn - lead vocals
- Ronnie McCoury - mandolin
- Pat McLaughlin - mandolin
- Willie Nelson - duet vocals on "Lay Me Down"
- Jon Randall - backing vocals
- Randy Scruggs - acoustic guitar
- Will Smith - autoharp
- Bryan Sutton - banjo, acoustic guitar
- Robby Turner - pedal steel guitar
- Laura Weber - fiddle, acoustic guitar, backing vocals
- Jeff White - acoustic guitar, backing vocals

== Chart performance ==
=== Weekly charts ===
Chart (2016)	Peak position
Australian Albums (ARIA)	54
Australian Country Albums (ARIA)	4
Belgian Albums (Ultratop Flanders)	149
Canadian Albums (Billboard)	37
Dutch Albums (Album Top 100)	23
UK Country Albums (Official Charts)	1
US Billboard 200	19
US Top Country Albums (Billboard)	4
Scottish Albums (Official Charts)	76
US Americana/Folk Albums (Billboard)	2

=== Year-end charts ===
Chart (2016)	Position
US Top Country Albums (Billboard)	44
