= Loretta Lynn =

American country singer (1932–2022)

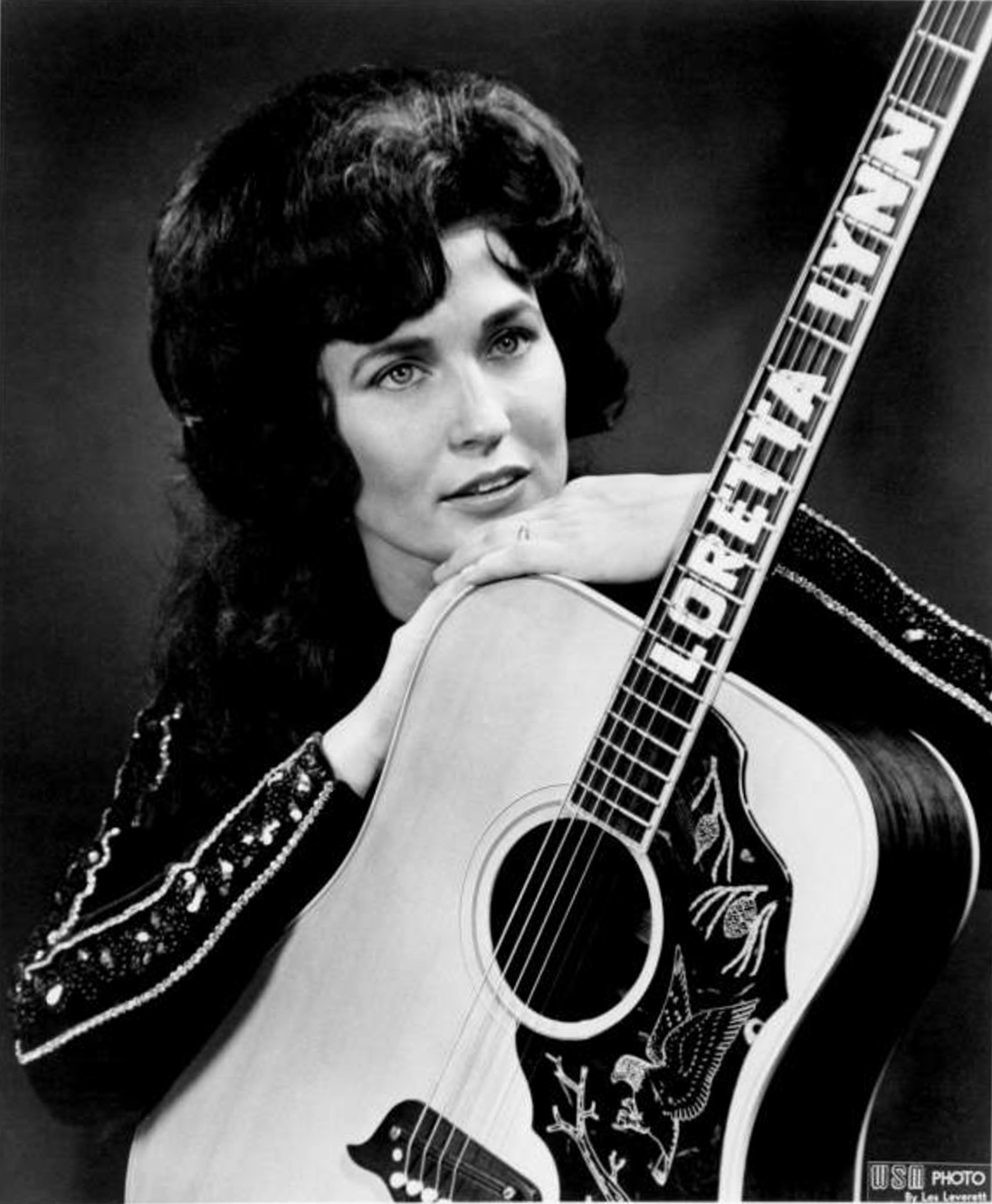
- Publicity photo, 1965
- Born: Loretta Webb; April 14, 1932; Butcher Hollow, Kentucky, U.S.
- Died: October 4, 2022 (aged 90); Hurricane Mills, Tennessee, U.S.
- Resting place: Hurricane Mills, Tennessee
- Occupation: Singer-songwriter
- Years active: 1960–2022
- Spouse: Oliver Lynn (m. 1948; died 1996)
- Children: 6, including Peggy and Patsy
- Relatives: Crystal Gayle (sister); Jay Lee Webb (brother); Peggy Sue (sister)
- Musical career
- Genres: Country; honky-tonk; Americana; gospel
- Instruments: Vocals; guitar
- Labels: Zero; Decca; MCA; Columbia; Third Man; Audium; Interscope; Legacy
- Website: lorettalynn.com

Loretta Lynn (née Webb; April 14, 1932 – October 4, 2022) was an American country music singer and songwriter. In a career spanning six decades, Lynn released multiple gold albums. She had numerous hits such as "Hey Loretta", "The Pill", "Blue Kentucky Girl", "Love Is The Foundation", "You're Lookin' At Country", "You Ain't Woman Enough", "I'm A Honky Tonk Girl", "Don't Come Home A Drinkin' (With Lovin' On Your Mind)", "One's On the Way", "Fist City", and "Coal Miner's Daughter". The 1980 musical film Coal Miner's Daughter was based on her life, in which actress Sissy Spacek portrayed Lynn.

Lynn received many awards and other accolades for her groundbreaking role in country music, including awards from both the Country Music Association and Academy of Country Music (ACM) as a duet partner and an individual artist. She was nominated 18 times for a Grammy Award and won three times. As of 2022, Lynn was the most awarded female country recording artist and the only female ACM Artist of the Decade (the 1970s). Lynn scored 24 No. 1 hit singles and 11 number-one albums. She ended 57 years of touring on the road after she suffered a stroke in 2017 and broke her hip in 2018.

== Early life and career ==
Lynn was born Loretta Webb on April 14, 1932, in Butcher Hollow, Kentucky, the oldest daughter and second child of Clara Marie "Clary" (née Ramey; May 5, 1912 – November 24, 1981) and Melvin Theodore "Ted" Webb (June 6, 1906 – February 22, 1959). Ted was a coal miner and subsistence farmer. Lynn had one older sibling, Melvin "Junior" Webb (1929–1993), and six younger siblings: Herman Webb (1934–2018), Willie "Jay" Lee Webb (February 12, 1937 – July 31, 1996), Donald Ray Webb (1941–2017), Peggy Sue Wright (née Webb; born March 25, 1943), Betty Ruth Hopkins (née Webb; born 1946), and Crystal Gayle (born Brenda Gail Webb; January 9, 1951). The family claims Cherokee heritage on Lynn's mother's side, but they have not been officially recognized by the tribe. Lynn was named after the film star Loretta Young.

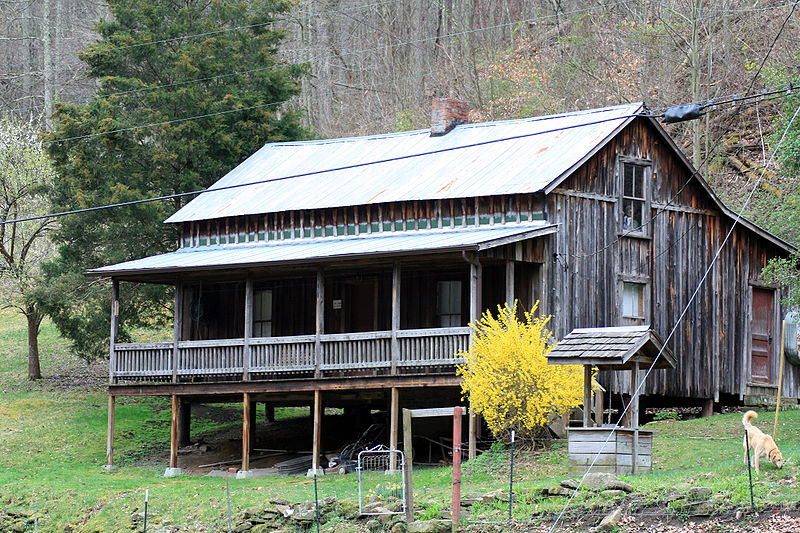
Childhood home of Loretta Lynn in Kentucky

Loretta's father, Ted, died at age 52 from a stroke four years after relocating with her mother and younger siblings to Wabash, Indiana. He had also been battling black lung disease at the time of his death.

Through her matriline, Lynn was a distant cousin of country singer Patty Loveless.

== Career ==
=== 1960–1966: Early country success ===
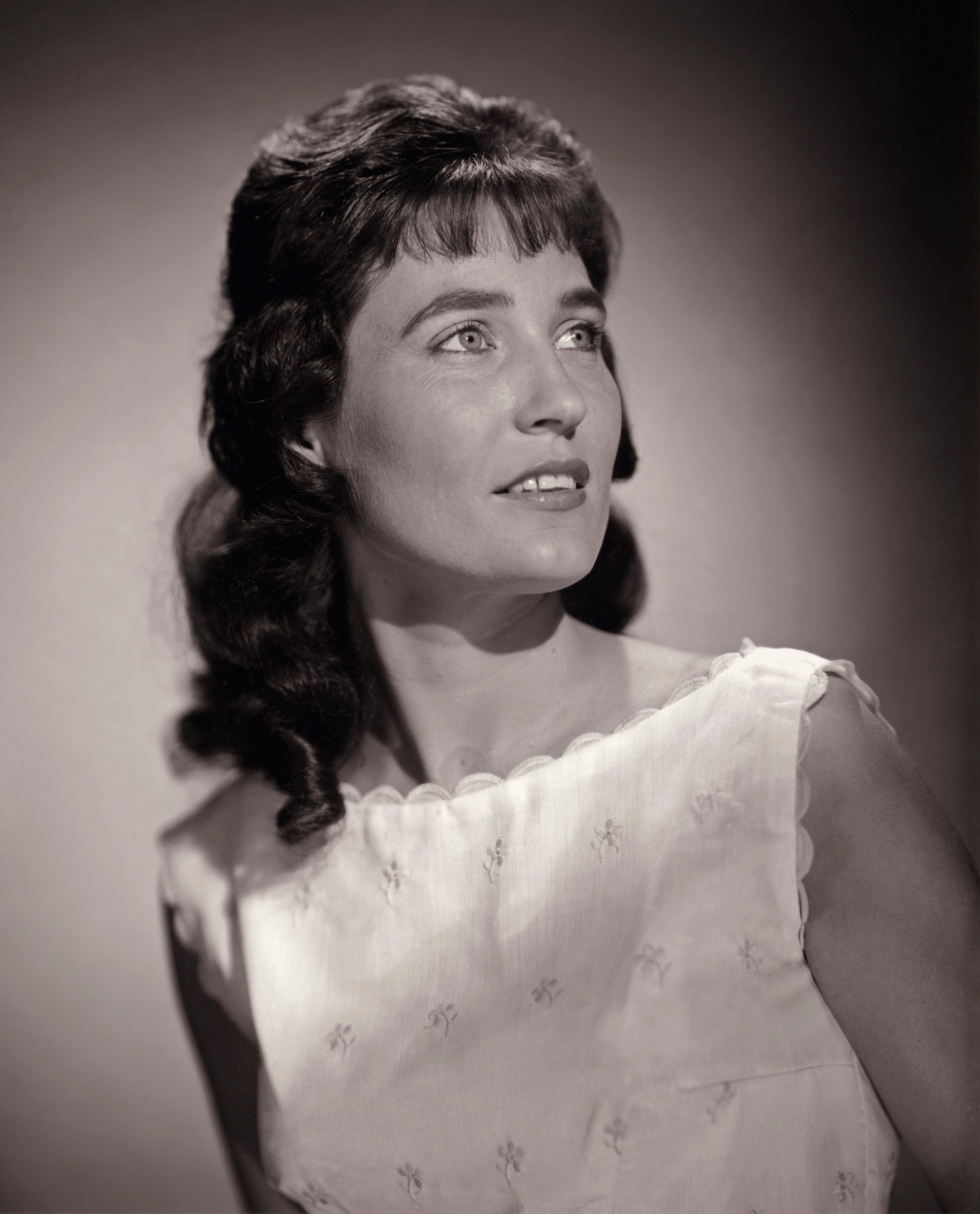
Lynn in 1962

Lynn began singing in local clubs in the late 1950s. She later formed her own band, the Trailblazers which included her brother Jay Lee Webb. Lynn won a wristwatch in a televised talent contest in Tacoma, Washington, hosted by Buck Owens. Lynn's performance was seen by Canadian Norm Burley of Zero Records, who co-founded the record company after hearing Loretta sing.

Zero Records president, Canadian Don Grashey, arranged a recording session in Hollywood, where four of Lynn's compositions were recorded, including "I'm A Honky Tonk Girl", "Whispering Sea", "Heartache Meet Mister Blues", and "New Rainbow". Her first release featured "Whispering Sea" and "I'm a Honky Tonk Girl". Lynn signed her first contract on February 2, 1960, with Zero. Her album was recorded at United Western Recorders in Hollywood, engineered by Don Blake and produced by Grashey. Musicians who played on the songs were steel guitar player Speedy West, fiddler Harold Hensley, guitarist Roy Lanham, Al Williams on bass, and Muddy Berry on drums. Lynn commented on the different sound of her first record: "Well, there is a West Coast sound that is definitely not the same as the Nashville sound [...] It was a shuffle with a West Coast beat".

The Lynns toured the country to promote the release to country stations, while Grashey and Del Roy took the music to KFOX in Long Beach, California. When the Lynns reached Nashville, the song was a hit, climbing to No. 14 on Billboard's Country and Western chart, and Lynn began cutting demo records for the Wilburn Brothers Publishing Company. Through the Wilburns, she secured a contract with Decca Records. The first Loretta Lynn Fan Club formed in November 1960. By the end of the year, Billboard magazine listed Lynn as the No. 4 Most Promising Country Female Artist.

Lynn's relationship with the Wilburn Brothers and her appearances on the Grand Ole Opry, beginning in 1960, helped Lynn become the No. 1 female recording artist in country music. Her contract with the Wilburn Brothers gave them the publishing rights to her material. She unsuccessfully fought the Wilburn Brothers for 30 years to regain the publishing rights to her songs after ending her business relationship with them. Lynn stopped writing music in the 1970s because of the contracts. Lynn joined the Grand Ole Opry on September 25, 1962.

Lynn credited Patsy Cline as her mentor and best friend during her early years in music. In 2010, when interviewed for Jimmy McDonough's biography of Tammy Wynette, Tammy Wynette: Tragic Country Queen, Lynn said of having best friends in Patsy and Tammy during different times: "Best friends are like husbands. You only need one at a time."

Lynn released her first Decca single, "Success", in 1962, and it went straight to No. 6, beginning a string of Top 10 singles that would run throughout the 1970s. Lynn's music began to regularly hit the Top 10 after 1964 with songs such as "Before I'm Over You", which peaked at No. 4, followed by "Wine, Women and Song", which peaked at No. 3. In late 1964, she recorded a duet album with Ernest Tubb. Their lead single, "Mr. and Mrs. Used to Be", peaked within the Top 15. The pair recorded two more albums, Singin' Again (1967) and If We Put Our Heads Together (1969). In 1965, her solo career continued with three major hits, "Happy Birthday", "Blue Kentucky Girl" (later recorded and made a Top 10 hit in the 1970s by Emmylou Harris), and "The Home You're Tearing Down". Lynn's label issued two albums that year, Songs from My Heart and Blue Kentucky Girl.

Lynn's first self-penned song to crack the Top 10, 1966's "Dear Uncle Sam", was among the first recordings to recount the human costs of the Vietnam War. Her 1966 hit "You Ain't Woman Enough (To Take My Man)" made Lynn the first country female recording artist to write a No. 1 hit.

=== 1967–1980: Breakthrough success ===
In 1967, Lynn released the single "Don't Come Home A-Drinkin' (With Lovin' on Your Mind)", It was her second No. 1 country hit.

Lynn's next album, Fist City, was released in 1968. The title track became Lynn's third No. 1 hit, as a single earlier that year, and the other single from the album, "What Kind of a Girl (Do You Think I Am)", peaked within the Top 10. In 1968, her next studio album, Your Squaw Is on the Warpath, spawned two Top 5 Country hits, including the title track and "You've Just Stepped In (From Stepping Out on Me)". In 1969, her next single, "Woman of the World (Leave My World Alone)", was Lynn's fourth chart-topper, followed by a subsequent Top 10, "To Make a Man (Feel Like a Man)". Her song "You Ain't Woman Enough (To Take My Man)", was an instant hit and became one of Lynn's all-time most popular. Her career continued to be successful into the 1970s, especially following the success of her autobiographical hit "Coal Miner's Daughter", which peaked at No. 1 on the Billboard Country Chart in 1970. The song became her first single to chart on the Billboard Hot 100, peaking at No. 83. She had a series of singles that charted low on the Hot 100 between 1970 and 1975. In 1978, she became a special guest star on The Muppet Show. The song "Coal Miner's Daughter" later served as the impetus for her bestselling autobiography (1976) and the Oscar-winning biopic, both of which share the song's title.

In 1973, "Rated "X"" peaked at No. 1 on the Billboard Country Chart and was considered one of Lynn's most controversial hits. The following year, her next single, "Love Is the Foundation", also became a No. 1 country hit from her album of the same name. The second and last single from that album, "Hey Loretta", became a Top 5 hit. Lynn continued to reach the Top 10 until the end of the decade, including 1975's "The Pill", one of the first songs to discuss birth control. Many of Lynn's songs were autobiographical, and as a songwriter, Lynn felt no topic was off limits, as long as it was relatable to women. In 1976, she released her autobiography, Coal Miner's Daughter, with the help of writer George Vecsey. It became a bestseller, with more than 8 weeks on The New York Times Best Seller list.

==== Professional partnership with Conway Twitty ====
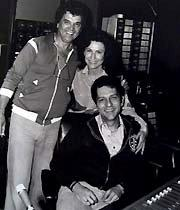
David Barnes, Conway Twitty and Lynn in 1979

In 1971, Lynn began a professional partnership with Conway Twitty. As a duo, Lynn and Twitty had five consecutive No. 1 hits between 1971 and 1975, including "After the Fire Is Gone" (1971), which won them a Grammy award; "Lead Me On" (1971); "Louisiana Woman, Mississippi Man" (1973); "As Soon as I Hang Up the Phone" (1974); and "Feelins'" (1974). For four consecutive years, 1972-75, Lynn and Twitty were named the "Vocal Duo of the Year" by the Country Music Association. The Academy of Country Music named them the "Best Vocal Duet" in 1971, 1974, 1975, and 1976. The American Music awards selected them as the "Favorite Country Duo" in 1975, 1976, and 1977. The fan-voted Music City News readers voted them the No. 1 duet every year between 1971 and 1981, inclusive. In addition to their five No. 1 singles, they had seven other Top 10 hits between 1976 and 1981.

As a solo artist, Lynn continued her success in 1971, achieving her fifth No. 1 solo hit, "One's on the Way", written by poet and songwriter Shel Silverstein. She also charted with "I Wanna Be Free", "You're Lookin' at Country", and 1972's "Here I Am Again", all released on separate albums. The next year, she became the first country star on the cover of Newsweek. In 1972, Lynn was the first woman to be nominated and win Entertainer of the Year at the CMA awards. She won the Female Vocalist of the Year and Duo of the Year with Conway Twitty, beating out George Jones and Tammy Wynette and Porter Wagoner and Dolly Parton.

==== Tribute album for Patsy Cline, other projects, and honors ====
In 1977, Lynn recorded I Remember Patsy, an album dedicated to her friend, singer Patsy Cline, who died in a plane crash in 1963. The album covered some of Cline's biggest hits. The two singles Lynn released from the album, "She's Got You" and "Why Can't He Be You", became hits. "She's Got You", which went to No. 1 by Cline in 1962 and went to No. 1 again by Lynn. "Why Can't He Be You" peaked at No. 7. Lynn had her last No. 1 hit in 1978 with "Out of My Head and Back in My Bed".

In 1979, Lynn had two Top 5 hits, "I Can't Feel You Anymore" and "I've Got a Picture of Us on My Mind", from separate albums.

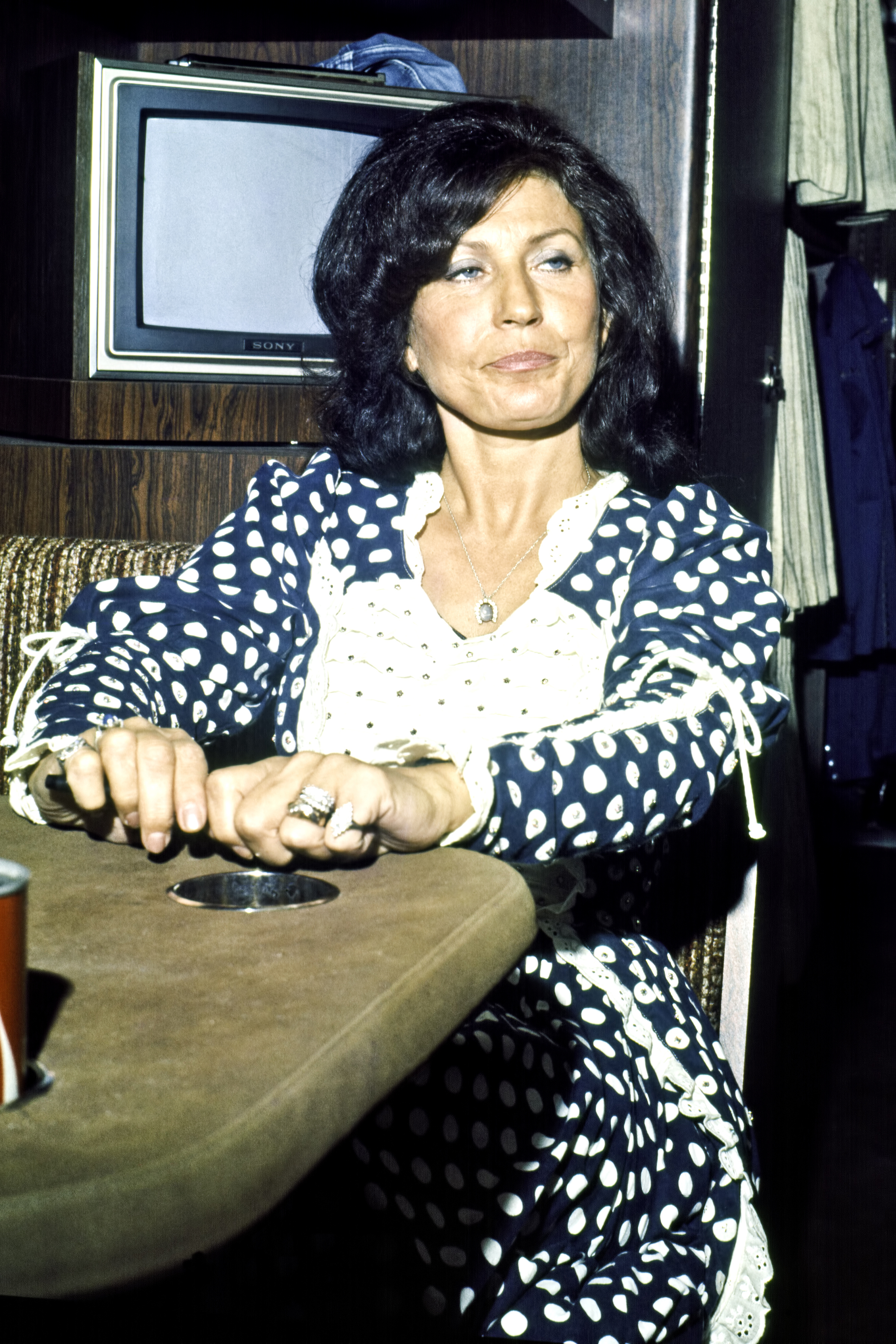
Lynn on tour in 1975

Devoted to her fans, Lynn told the editor of Salisbury, Maryland's newspaper the reason she signed hundreds of autographs: "These people are my fans... I'll stay here until the very last one wants my autograph. Without these people, I am nobody. I love these people." In 1979, she became the spokesperson for Procter & Gamble's Crisco Oil. Because of her dominant hold on the 1970s, Lynn was named the "Artist of the Decade" by the Academy of Country Music. She is the only woman to have won this honor.

Lynn became a part of the country music scene in Nashville in the 1960s. In 1967, she had the first of 16 No. 1 hits out of 70 charted songs as a solo artist and a duet partner. Her later hits include "Don't Come Home A-Drinkin' (With Lovin' on Your Mind)", "You Ain't Woman Enough (To Take My Man)", "Fist City", and "Coal Miner's Daughter".

Lynn focused on women's issues with themes about philandering husbands and persistent mistresses. Her music was inspired by issues she faced in her marriage. She widened the boundaries in the conservative genre of country music by singing about birth control ("The Pill"), repeated childbirth ("One's on the Way"), double standards for men and women ("Rated 'X'"), and being widowed by the draft during the Vietnam War ("Dear Uncle Sam").

Country music radio stations often refused to play her music. In a 1987 interview, Lynn said eight of her songs had been banned.

Her bestselling 1976 autobiography, Coal Miner's Daughter, was made into an Academy Award–winning film with the same title in 1980, starring Sissy Spacek and Tommy Lee Jones. Spacek won the Academy Award for Best Actress for her role as Lynn. Lynn's album Van Lear Rose, released in 2004, was produced by the alternative rock musician Jack White. Lynn and White were nominated for five Grammys and won two.

Lynn received numerous awards in country and American music. She was inducted into the Nashville Songwriters Hall of Fame in 1983, the Country Music Hall of Fame in 1988, and the Songwriters Hall of Fame in 2008. She was honored in 2010 at the Country Music Awards. She was awarded the Presidential Medal of Freedom by President Barack Obama in 2013. Lynn was a member of the Grand Ole Opry since joining on September 25, 1962. Her debut appearance on the Grand Ole Opry was on October 15, 1960. Lynn recorded 70 albums including 54 studio albums, 15 compilation albums, and a tribute album.

=== 1980–1989: Movie and popularity ===
On March 5, 1980, the film Coal Miner's Daughter debuted in Nashville and soon became the No. 1 box office hit in the United States. The film starred Sissy Spacek as Loretta and Tommy Lee Jones as her husband, Doolittle "Mooney" Lynn. The film received seven Academy Award nominations, winning the Best Actress Oscar for Spacek, a gold album for the soundtrack album, a Grammy nomination for Spacek, Country Music Association and Academy of Country Music awards, and several Golden Globe awards. The 1980s featured more hits, including "Pregnant Again", "Naked in the Rain", and "Somebody Led Me Away". Lynn's last Top 10 record as a soloist was 1982's "I Lie", but her releases continued to chart until the end of the decade.

One of her last solo releases was "Heart Don't Do This to Me" (1985), which reached No. 19, her last Top 20 hit. Her 1985 album Just a Woman spawned a Top 40 hit. In 1987, Lynn lent her voice to a song on k.d. lang's album Shadowland with country stars Kitty Wells and Brenda Lee, "Honky Tonk Angels Medley". The album was certified gold and was Grammy nominated for the four women. Lynn's 1988 album Who Was That Stranger would be her last solo album for MCA, which she parted ways with in 1989. She was inducted into the Country Music Hall of Fame in 1988.

=== 1990–2004: Return to country and second autobiography ===
Lynn returned to the public eye in 1993 with a hit album, the trio album Honky Tonk Angels, recorded with Dolly Parton and Tammy Wynette. The album peaked at No. 6 on the Billboard Country charts and No. 42 on the Billboard Pop charts and charted a single with "Silver Threads and Golden Needles". The album sold more than 800,000 copies and was certified gold in the United States and Canada. The trio was nominated for Grammy and Country Music Association awards. Lynn released a three-CD boxed set chronicling her career on MCA Records. In 1995, she taped a seven-week series on the Nashville Network (TNN), Loretta Lynn & Friends.

In 1995, Loretta was presented with the Pioneer Award at the 30th Academy of Country Music Awards. In 1996, Lynn's husband, Oliver Vanetta "Doolittle" Lynn, died five days short of his 70th birthday. In 2000, Lynn released her first album in several years, Still Country, in which she included "I Can't Hear the Music", a tribute song to her late husband. She released her first new single in more than 10 years from the album, "Country in My Genes". The single charted on the Billboard Country singles chart and made Lynn the first woman in country music to chart singles in five decades. In 2002, Lynn published her second autobiography, Still Woman Enough, and it became her second New York Times Best Seller, peaking in the Top 10. In 2004, she published a cookbook, You're Cookin' It Country.

=== 2004–2022: Late career resurgence ===
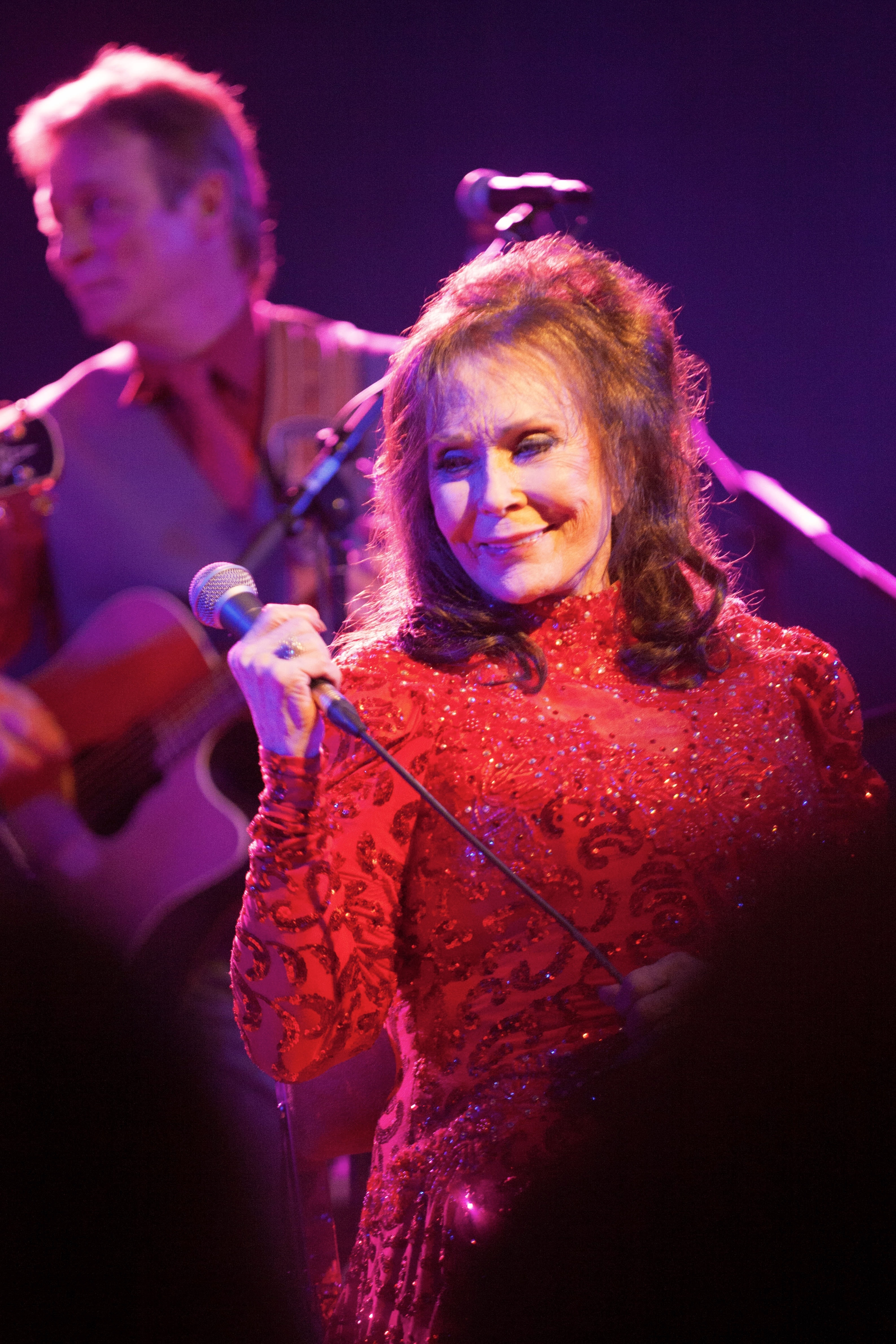
Lynn performing at South by Southwest in 2016

In 2004, Lynn released Van Lear Rose, the second album on which Lynn either wrote or co-wrote every song. Produced by Jack White of The White Stripes, the album featured guitar and backup vocals by White. The collaboration garnered Lynn high praise from the mainstream and alternative rock music press, such as Spin and Blender. Rolling Stone voted it the second best album of 2004, and it won the Grammy Award for Best Country Album of the Year.

Late in 2010, Sony Music released a new compilation album, Coal Miner's Daughter: A Tribute to Loretta Lynn, featuring stars like Reba McEntire, Faith Hill, Paramore, and Carrie Underwood performing Lynn's classic hits spanning 50 years. The album produced a Top 10 hit music video on Great American Country of the single "Coal Miner's Daughter", featuring Lynn, Miranda Lambert and Sheryl Crow. The track cracked the Billboard singles chart, making Lynn the only female country artist to chart in six decades. Lynn's concerts during this period included performances at the Nelsonville Music Festival in Nelsonville, Ohio, in May 2010, and at the Bonnaroo Music and Arts Festival on June 11, 2011. In 2012, Lynn published her third autobiography, Honky Tonk Girl: My Life in Lyrics. She also contributed "Take Your Gun and Go, John" to Divided & United: Songs of the Civil War, released on November 5, 2013.

In November 2015, Lynn announced the completion of a new album, Full Circle. Released in March 2016, the album debuted at No. 19 on the Billboard Hot 200 and went on to become Lynn's 40th album to make the Top 10 on Billboard's best selling country chart. It featured a combination of new songs and classics, and duets with Elvis Costello and Willie Nelson.

Lynn's holiday album White Christmas Blue was released in October 2016. In December of the same year, Full Circle was nominated for Country Album of the Year in the 59th Annual Grammy Awards.

Following Full Circle, the album Wouldn't It Be Great was released by Legacy Recordings in September 2018 after being delayed by health issues, which had caused Lynn to cancel all of her scheduled tour dates in 2017. Lynn was named Artist of a Lifetime by CMT in 2018. On October 19, 2019, Lifetime aired the movie Patsy & Loretta which highlighted the friendship of Lynn and Patsy Cline.

On March 19, 2021, Lynn released her 50th studio album Still Woman Enough, the fourth album of her deal with Legacy Recordings. Recorded in sessions at Cash Cabin Studio in Tennessee, it features Carrie Underwood and Reba McEntire on the title track, alongside duets with Tanya Tucker and Margo Price on re-recordings of "You Ain't Woman Enough" and "One's on the Way", respectively.

== Personal life ==
=== Marriage ===
On January 10, 1948, 15-year-old Loretta Webb married 21-year-old Oliver Vanetta Lynn Jr. (August 27, 1926 – August 22, 1996), better known as "Doolittle", "Doo", or "Mooney". They had met only a month earlier. The Lynns left Kentucky and moved to the logging community of Custer in northwest Washington when Lynn was seven months pregnant with their first child. The happiness and heartache of her early years of marriage helped inspire Lynn's songwriting. They were married for almost 50 years until his death in 1996 at age 69. In her 2002 autobiography Still Woman Enough, and in an interview with CBS News the same year, she recounted how her husband cheated on her regularly and once left her while she was giving birth. Lynn stated that she and her husband fought frequently, but that "he never hit me one time that I didn't hit him back twice." Loretta said that her marriage was "one of the hardest love stories".

In one of her autobiographies, she recalled:

I married Doo when I wasn't but a child, and he was my life from that day on. But as important as my youth and upbringing was, there's something else that made me stick to Doo. He thought I was something special, more special than anyone else in the world, and never let me forget it. That belief would be hard to shove out the door. Doo was my security, my safety net. And just remember, I'm explainin', not excusin'... Doo was a good man and a hard worker. But he was an alcoholic, and it affected our marriage all the way through.

=== Children ===
Loretta and her husband had six children. Their eldest daughter, Betty Sue, was born on November 26, 1948, and died of complications associated with emphysema on July 29, 2013. Their second child and eldest son, Jack Benny Lynn, born December 7, 1949, was found dead by drowning on July 24, 1984, after going missing while horse riding on his mother's Hurricane Mills ranch. Their third and fourth children are Ernest Ray Lynn, born May 27, 1951, and Clara Marie "Cissie" Lynn, born less than a year later on April 7, 1952. Their youngest children, twin daughters Peggy Jean and Patsy Eileen, were born on August 6, 1964; they are named after Lynn's sister, Peggy Sue Wright, and her friend, Patsy Cline.

Patsy's daughter and Loretta's granddaughter, Emmy Russell, auditioned for season 22 of American Idol, making the cut and earning the golden ticket to Hollywood. She tied for fourth place alongside Triston Harper one week before the Finale.

=== Loretta Lynn's Ranch ===
Lynn owned a ranch in Hurricane Mills, Tennessee, known as Loretta Lynn's Ranch. Billed as "the seventh largest attraction in Tennessee", it features a recording studio, museums, lodging, restaurants, and western stores. Traditionally, three holiday concerts are hosted annually at the ranch, Memorial Day Weekend, Fourth of July Weekend, and Labor Day Weekend.

The centerpiece of the ranch is its large plantation home which Lynn once resided in with her husband and children. Having built a modern home behind it, Lynn had not lived in the antebellum mansion in more than 30 years prior to her death. Lynn regularly greeted fans who were touring the house. A replica of the cabin in which Lynn grew up, in Butcher Hollow, is one of its main features.

Since 1982, the ranch has hosted Loretta Lynn's Amateur Championship motocross race, the largest amateur motocross race of its kind. The ranch also hosts GNCC Racing events.

=== Politics ===
At the height of her popularity, some of Lynn's songs were banned from radio airplay, including "Rated "X"", about the double standards divorced women face; "Wings Upon Your Horns", about the loss of teenage virginity; and "The Pill", about a wife and mother becoming liberated by the birth-control pill. Her song "Dear Uncle Sam", released in 1966, during the Vietnam War, describes a wife's anguish at the loss of a husband to war. It was included in her live performances during the Iraq War.

In 1971, Lynn performed at the White House, at the invitation of President Richard Nixon. She returned there to perform during the administrations of Jimmy Carter, Ronald Reagan, George H. W. Bush, and George W. Bush. In 2002's Still Woman Enough, she discussed her longtime friendship and support for Jimmy Carter. She endorsed and campaigned for George H. W. Bush in the presidential election in 1988.

In 2016, Lynn expressed support for Donald Trump's presidential campaign, stumping for him at the end of each of her shows. She stated, "I just think he's the only one who's going to turn this country around."

Although Lynn was outspoken about her views on controversial social and political subjects, she saw herself as apolitical, writing in her 1976 autobiography that, "I don't like to talk too much about things where you're going to get one side or the other unhappy....My music has no politics."

While a recognized "advocate for ordinary women", Lynn often criticized upper-class feminism for ignoring the needs and concerns of working-class women. She rejected being labeled a feminist, and wrote in her memoir, "I'm not a big fan of women's liberation, but maybe it will help women stand up for the respect they're due."

When asked about her position on same-sex marriage by USA Today in November 2010, she replied, "I'm still an old Bible girl. God said you need to be a woman and man, but everybody to their own."

Lynn allowed PETA to use her song "I Wanna Be Free" in a public service campaign to discourage the chaining of dogs outdoors in the cold.

=== Health and death ===
Over the years, Lynn suffered from various health concerns, including pneumonia on multiple occasions and a broken arm after a fall at home.

In May 2017, Lynn had a stroke at her home in Hurricane Mills. She was taken to a Nashville hospital and, as a result, had to cancel all of her upcoming tour dates. The release of her album Wouldn't It Be Great was delayed until 2018. On January 1, 2018, Lynn fell and broke her hip.

Lynn died in her sleep at her home in Hurricane Mills on October 4, 2022, at age 90. A family representative told the website TMZ that she died of natural causes. She was buried three days later on her Hurricane Mills ranch beside her husband Doolittle.

== Awards and achievements ==
Lynn wrote more than 160 songs and released 60 albums. She had 10 No. 1 albums and 16 No. 1 singles on the country charts. Lynn won three Grammy Awards, seven American Music Awards, eight Broadcast Music Incorporated awards, 14 Academy of Country Music, eight Country Music Association, and 26 fan-voted Music City News awards. Lynn remains the most awarded woman in country music history. She was the first woman in country music to receive a certified gold album for 1967's Don't Come Home a' Drinkin' (With Lovin' on Your Mind).

=== 1970s – 1990s ===
In 1972, Lynn was the first woman named "Entertainer of the Year" by the Country Music Association. In 1980, she was the only woman to be named "Artist of the Decade" for the 1970s by the Academy of Country Music. Lynn was inducted into the Country Music Hall of Fame in 1988 and the Country Gospel Music Hall of Fame in 1999. She was also the recipient of Kennedy Center Honors, an award given by the President of the United States, in 2003. Lynn is ranked 65th on VH1's 100 Greatest Women of Rock & Roll and was the first female country artist to receive a star on the Hollywood Walk of Fame in 1977. In 1994, she received the country music pioneer award from the Academy of Country Music.

=== 2000s ===
In 2001, "Coal Miner's Daughter" was named among NPR's "100 Most Significant Songs of the 20th Century". In 2002, Lynn had the highest ranking, No. 3, for any living female, in CMT television's special of the 40 Greatest Women of Country Music.

A BMI affiliate for more than 45 years, Lynn was honored as a BMI Icon at the BMI Country Awards on November 4, 2004.

In March 2007, Lynn was awarded an Honorary Doctorate of Music from Berklee College of Music during her performance at the Grand Ole Opry.

Lynn was inducted into the Songwriters Hall of Fame in New York City in 2008.

=== 2010s ===
Loretta Lynn was honored with multiple awards in 2010 as the music industry celebrated her 50th year as a country artist. She received the Grammy Lifetime Achievement Award on January 30, 2010.

Lynn was honored for 50 years in country music at the 44th Annual Country Music Awards on November 10, 2010. That same year, Lynn was presented with a new rose, the "Loretta Lynn Van Lear", named in her honor. In the same month, Sony Music released a tribute CD to Lynn titled Coal Miner's Daughter: A Tribute to Loretta Lynn. The CD features Kid Rock, Reba McEntire, Sheryl Crow, Miranda Lambert, Alan Jackson, Gretchen Wilson, The White Stripes, Martina McBride, Paramore, Steve Earle, and Faith Hill. In 2011, Lynn was nominated for an Academy of Country Music, CMT Video and Country Music Association awards for "Vocal Event of the Year" with Miranda Lambert and Sheryl Crow for "Coal Miner's Daughter", released as a video and single from the CD.

Lynn marked her 50th anniversary as a Grand Ole Opry member on September 25, 2012, and her 60th anniversary in 2022.

Lynn was awarded the Presidential Medal of Freedom by Barack Obama in 2013.

Miranda Lambert presented Lynn with the Crystal Milestone Award from the Academy of Country Music. Lynn also received the 2015 Billboard Legacy Award for Women in Music.

In 2016, she was the subject of an American Masters profile documentary Loretta Lynn: Still a Mountain Girl on PBS.

Lynn was named Artist of a Lifetime in 2018 by CMT.

=== 2020s ===
The Ryman Auditorium honored Lynn with a statue installation on its Icon Walk in a ceremony held October 20, 2020. Lynn was the first woman represented on the Icon Walk, joining previously honored Bill Monroe and Little Jimmy Dickens.

Recognizing Lynn as a songwriter, the Women Songwriters Hall of Fame inducted her in 2022, stating "she shook up Nashville by writing her own songs, many of which tackled boundary-pushing topics drawn from her own life experiences as a wife and mother". Rolling Stone ranked Lynn at number 132 on its list of the 200 Greatest Singers of All Time in an issue published the next year.

== Discography ==
Studio albums

- Loretta Lynn Sings (1963)
- Before I'm Over You (1964)
- Songs from My Heart.... (1965)
- Blue Kentucky Girl (1965)
- Mr. and Mrs. Used to Be (with Ernest Tubb) (1965)
- Hymns (1965)
- I Like 'Em Country (1966)
- You Ain't Woman Enough (1966)
- Country Christmas (1966)
- Don't Come Home a Drinkin' (With Lovin' on Your Mind) (1967)
- Singin' Again (with Ernest Tubb) (1967)
- Singin' with Feelin' (1967)
- Who Says God Is Dead! (1968)
- Fist City (1968)
- Your Squaw Is on the Warpath (1969)
- If We Put Our Heads Together (with Ernest Tubb) (1969)
- Woman of the World/To Make a Man (1969)
- Wings Upon Your Horns (1970)
- Coal Miner's Daughter (1971)
- We Only Make Believe (with Conway Twitty) (1971)
- I Wanna Be Free (1971)
- You're Lookin' at Country (1971)
- Lead Me On (with Conway Twitty) (1972)
- One's on the Way (1972)
- God Bless America Again (1972)
- Here I Am Again (1972)
- Entertainer of the Year (1973)
- Louisiana Woman, Mississippi Man (with Conway Twitty) (1973)
- Love Is the Foundation (1973)
- Country Partners (with Conway Twitty) (1974)
- They Don't Make 'Em Like My Daddy (1974)
- Back to the Country (1975)
- Feelins' (with Conway Twitty) (1975)
- Home (1975)
- When the Tingle Becomes a Chill (1976)
- United Talent (with Conway Twitty) (1976)
- Somebody Somewhere (1976)
- I Remember Patsy (1977)
- Dynamic Duo (with Conway Twitty) (1977)
- Out of My Head and Back in My Bed (1978)
- Honky Tonk Heroes (with Conway Twitty) (1978)
- We've Come a Long Way, Baby (1979)
- Diamond Duet (with Conway Twitty) (1979)
- Loretta (1980)
- Lookin' Good (1980)
- Two's a Party (with Conway Twitty) (1981)
- I Lie (1982)
- Making Love from Memory (1982)
- Lyin', Cheatin', Woman Chasin', Honky Tonkin', Whiskey Drinkin' You (1983)
- Just a Woman (1985)
- Who Was That Stranger (1988)
- Honky Tonk Angels (with Dolly Parton and Tammy Wynette) (1993)
- Making More Memories (1994)
- All Time Gospel Favorites (1997)
- Still Country (2000)
- Van Lear Rose (2004)
- Full Circle (2016)
- White Christmas Blue (2016)
- Wouldn't It Be Great (2018)
- Still Woman Enough (2021)

== See also ==
- List of country musicians

Awards
Preceded by Johnny Cash	AMA Album of the Year (artist); 2004	Succeeded by Buddy Miller
Preceded by Johnny Cash	AMA Artist of the Year; 2004	Succeeded by John Prine
