= List of awards and nominations received by Loretta Lynn =

Loretta Lynn awards and nominations
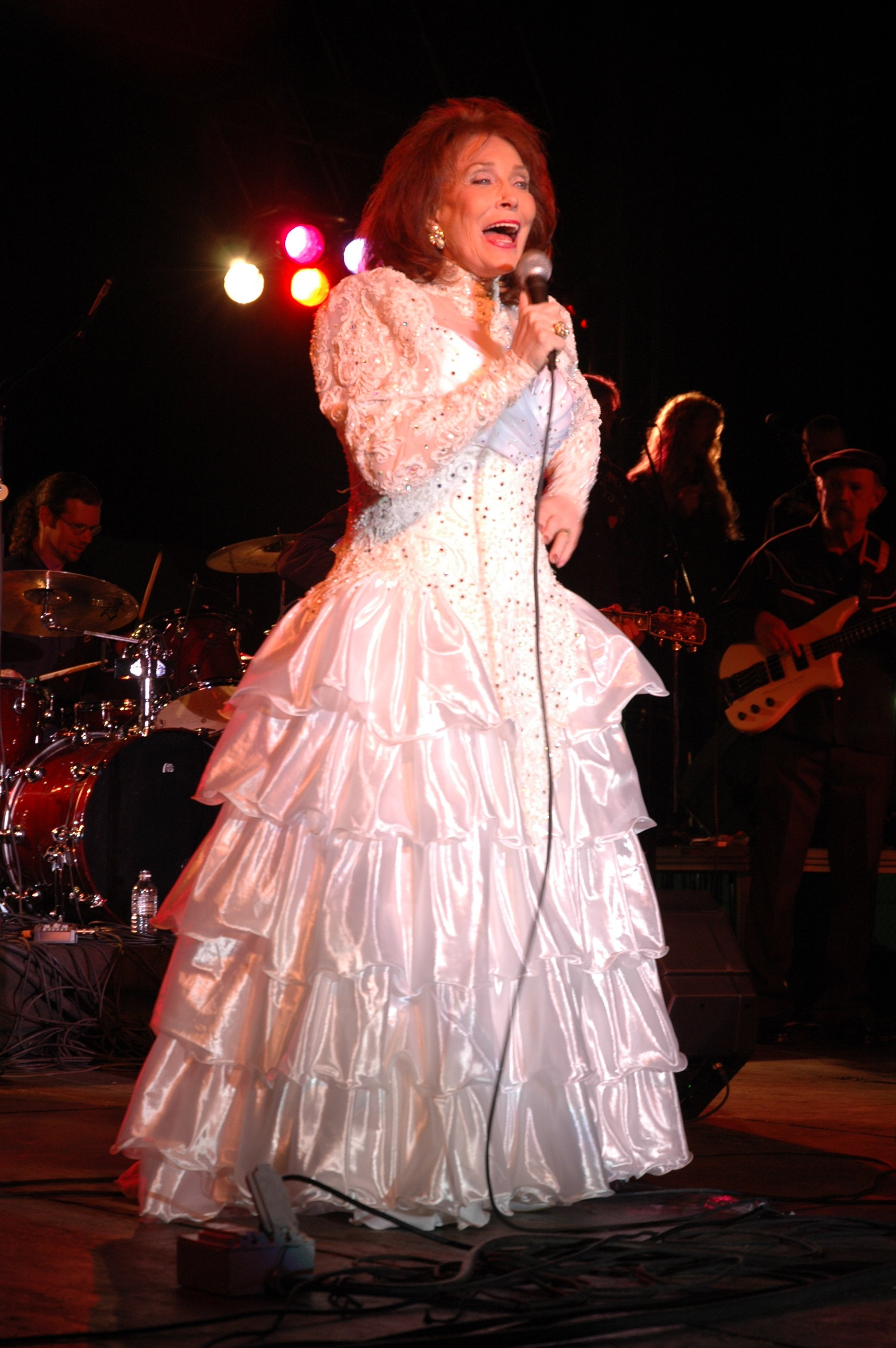
- Lynn in 2005
Awards and nominations
Award	Wins	Nominations
Academy of Country Music Awards	13	46
American Music Awards	7	7
Americana Music Awards	3	4
Billboard Women in Music	1	1
Country Music Association Awards	8	39
Grammy Awards	4	17
Music City News/CMT Awards	21	21

This article presents a list of major awards and honors won by American country music singer-songwriter Loretta Lynn.

== Awards ==
=== 1960s ===
Year	Award Program	Award
1967	Country Music Association Awards	Female Vocalist of the Year
1967	Music City News Country	Female Artist of the Year
1968	Music City News Country	Female Artist of the Year
1969	Music City News Country	Female Artist of the Year

=== 1970s ===
Year	Award Program	Award
1970	Music City News Country	Female Artist of the Year
1971	Grammy Awards	Best Country Vocal Performance by a Duo Or Group "After the Fire Is Gone" with Conway Twitty
1971	Academy of Country Music Awards	Top Female Vocalist
1971	Music City News Country	Female Artist of the Year
1971	Music City News Country	Vocal Duo of the Year; w/ Conway Twitty
1972	Music City News Country	Female Artist of the Year
1972	Music City News Country	Vocal Duo of the Year; (w/ Conway Twitty)
1972	Country Music Association Awards	Entertainer of the Year
1972	Country Music Association Awards	Female Vocalist of the Year
1972	Country Music Association Awards	Vocal Duo of the Year; (w/ Conway Twitty)
1973	Academy of Country Music Awards	Top Female Vocalist
1973	Music City News Country	Female Artist of the Year
1973	Music City News Country	Vocal Duo of the Year; (w/ Conway Twitty)
1973	Country Music Association Awards	Female Vocalist of the Year
1973	Country Music Association Awards	Vocal Duo of the Year; (w/ Conway Twitty)
1974	Academy of Country Music Awards	Top Female Vocalist
1974	Academy of Country Music Awards	Top Vocal Duo; (w/ Conway Twitty)
1974	Music City News Country	Female Artist of the Year
1974	Music City News Country	Vocal Duo of the Year; (w/ Conway Twitty)
1974	Country Music Association Awards	Vocal Duo of the Year; (w/ Conway Twitty)
1975	Academy of Country Music Awards	Entertainer of the Year
1975	Academy of Country Music Awards	Top Album of the Year; Feelins' (w/ Conway Twitty)
1975	Academy of Country Music Awards	Top Female Vocalist
1975	Academy of Country Music Awards	Top Vocal Duo; (w/ Conway Twitty)
1975	Country Music Association Awards	Vocal Duo of the Year (w/ Conway Twitty)
1975	American Music Awards	Favorite Country Band / Duo / Group; (w/ Conway Twitty)
1976	Academy of Country Music Awards	Top Vocal Duo; (w/ Conway Twitty)
1976	Music City News Country	Female Artist of the Year
1976	Music City News Country	Vocal Duo of the Year; (w/ Conway Twitty)
1976	Music City News Country	Album of the Year
1977	Music City News Country	Female Artist of the Year
1977	American Music Awards	Favorite Female Country Artist
1977	American Music Awards	Favorite Country Band / Duo / Group; (w/ Conway Twitty)
1978	Music City News Country	Female Vocalist of the Year
1978	Music City News Country	Vocal Duo of the Year; (w/ Conway Twitty)
1978	American Music Awards	Favorite Female Artist
1978	American Music Awards	Favorite Country Band / Duo / Group; (w/ Conway Twitty)
1978	Hollywood	Walk of Fame
1979	Academy of Country Music Awards	Artist of the Decade
1980	Music City News Country	Female Artist of the Year
1980	Music City News Country	Vocal Duo of the Year; (w/ Conway Twitty)

=== 1980s ===
Year	Award Program	Award
1981	Vocal Duo of the Year; (w/ Conway Twitty)	
1983	Nashville Songwriters Hall of Fame	Inducted
1985	American Music Award of Merit	
1986	Living Legend Award	
1986	Golden Plate Award of the American Academy of Achievement	
1988	Country Music Hall of Fame	Inducted

=== 1990s ===
Year	Award Program	Award
1994	Academy of Country Music Awards	Cliffie Stone Pioneer Award
1997	Grammy Awards	Hall of Fame Awards
1998	Grammy Hall of Fame	Single 1970 - Coal Miner's Daughter
1999	Country-Gospel Music Hall of Fame	Inducted

=== 2000s ===
Year	Award Program	Award
2001	VH1's 100 Greatest Women of Rock & Roll	Ranking - #65
2002	CMT's 40 Greatest Women of Country Music	Ranking - #3
2003	Kennedy Center Honors	Recipient
2004	Americana Music Association Awards	Artist of the Year
2004	Americana Music Association Awards	Album of the Year - Van Lear Rose
2004	Grammy Awards	Best Country Album; Van Lear Rose
2004	Grammy Awards	Best Country Collaboration with Vocals; (w/ Jack White)
2004	CMT Awards	Johnny Cash Visionary Award
2007	Grammy Awards	The Recording Academy Nashville Chapter's Recording Academy Honors Award.
2008	Songwriters Hall of Fame	1953–Present
2010	Grammy Awards	President's Merit Award
2010	Grammy Awards	Lifetime Achievement Award
2013	Presidential Medal of Freedom	Recipient
2014	Academy of Country Music Awards	Crystal Milestone Award
2014	Americana Music Association Awards	Lifetime Achievement for Songwriting
2015	Nashville Music City	Walk of Fame
2017	59th Grammy Awards	Best Country Album – Full Circle Nominated
2018	CMT Artist's of the Year Awards	Artist of a Lifetime

=== 2010s-present ===
Year	Award Program	Award
2021	Academy of Country Music Awards	Poet's Award
2022	Kentucky Country Music Association	Legend Award

== Academy of Country Music Awards ==
Year	Nominee / work	Award	Result
1969	Top Female Vocalist	Loretta Lynn	Nominated
1970	Top Female Vocalist	Loretta Lynn	Nominated
1971	Top Female Vocalist	Loretta Lynn	Won
1971	Top Television Personality	Loretta Lynn	Nominated
1971	Entertainer of the Year	Loretta Lynn	Nominated
1971	Song of the Year	"Lead Me On"	Nominated
1971	Single of the Year	"Lead Me On"	Nominated
1971	Single of the Year	"One's on the Way"	Nominated
1971	Top Vocal Group	Conway Twitty & Loretta Lynn	Won
1972	Top Vocal Group	Conway Twitty & Loretta Lynn	Nominated
1972	Entertainer of the Year	Loretta Lynn	Nominated
1972	Top Female Vocalist	Loretta Lynn	Nominated
1973	Top Female Vocalist	Loretta Lynn	Won
1973	Album of the Year	Louisiana Woman, Mississippi Man	Nominated
1973	Album of the Year	Love Is the Foundation	Nominated
1973	Top Vocal Group	Conway Twitty & Loretta Lynn	Nominated
1974	Top Vocal Group	Conway Twitty & Loretta Lynn	Won
1974	Album of the Year	They Don't Make 'Em Like My Daddy	Nominated
1974	Top Female Vocalist	Loretta Lynn	Won
1974	Entertainer of the Year	Loretta Lynn	Nominated
1975	Entertainer of the Year	Loretta Lynn	Won
1975	Top Female Vocalist	Loretta Lynn	Won
1975	Top Vocal Group	Conway Twitty & Loretta Lynn	Won
1975	Song of the Year	"When the Tingle Becomes a Chill"	Nominated
1975	Album of the Year	Feelins' (with Conway Twitty)	Won
1976	Album of the Year	Somebody Somewhere	Nominated
1976	Single of the Year	"Somebody Somewhere (Don't Know What He's Missin' Tonight)"	Nominated
1976	Song of the Year	"Somebody Somewhere (Don't Know What He's Missin' Tonight)"	Nominated
1976	Top Vocal Group	Conway Twitty & Loretta Lynn	Won
1976	Top Female Vocalist	Loretta Lynn	Nominated
1976	Entertainer of the Year	Loretta Lynn	Nominated
1977	Entertainer of the Year	Loretta Lynn	Nominated
1977	Female Vocalist of the Year	Loretta Lynn	Nominated
1977	Top Vocal Group	Conway Twitty & Loretta Lynn	Nominated
1978	Top Vocal Group	Conway Twitty & Loretta Lynn	Nominated
1978	Single of the Year	"Out of My Head and Back in My Bed"	Nominated
1978	Female Vocalist of the Year	Loretta Lynn	Nominated
1978	Entertainer of the Year	Loretta Lynn	Nominated
1979	Entertainer of the Year	Loretta Lynn	Nominated
1979	Artist of the Decade	Loretta Lynn	Won
1979	Female Vocalist of the Year	Loretta Lynn	Nominated
1980	Top Vocal Duet	Conway Twitty & Loretta Lynn	Nominated
1981	Top Vocal Duet	Conway Twitty & Loretta Lynn	Nominated
1994	Pioneer Award	Loretta Lynn	Won
2010	Vocal Event of the Year (with Miranda Lambert and Sheryl Crow)	"Coal Miner's Daughter"	Nominated
2014	Crystal Milestone Award	Loretta Lynn	Won
2021	Poet's Award	Loretta Lynn	Won

== American Music Awards ==
Year	Nominee / work	Award	Result
1975	Conway Twitty & Loretta Lynn	Favorite Country Group	Won
1977	Conway Twitty & Loretta Lynn	Favorite Country Group	Won
1977	Loretta Lynn	Favorite Country Female	Won
1978	Loretta Lynn	Favorite Country Female	Won
1978	Conway Twitty & Loretta Lynn	Favorite Country Group	Won
1985	Loretta Lynn	Award of Merit	Won

== Americana Music Honors & Awards ==
Year	Nominee / work	Award	Result
2004	Loretta Lynn	Artist of the Year	Won
2004	Van Lear Rose	Album of the Year	Won
2004	"Portland, Oregon"	Song of the Year	Nominated
2014	Loretta Lynn	Lifetime Achievement Award for Songwriting	Won

== Billboard Women in Music Awards ==
Year	Nominee / work	Award	Result
2015	Loretta Lynn	Legend Award	Won

== Grammy Awards ==
Year	Nominee / work	Award	Result
1966	"Don't Come Home A-Drinkin' (With Lovin' on Your Mind)"	Best Country & Western Vocal Performance, Female	Nominated
1971	"After the Fire Is Gone" (with Conway Twitty)	Best Country Vocal Performance by a Duo or Group	Won
1972	Lead Me On (with Conway Twitty)	Best Country Vocal Performance by a Duo or Group	Nominated
1972	"One's on the Way"	Best Country Vocal Performance, Female	Nominated
1973	"Louisiana Woman, Mississippi Man" (with Conway Twitty)	Best Country Vocal Performance by a Duo or Group	Nominated
1975	"Feelins'" (with Conway Twitty)	Best Country Vocal Performance by a Duo or Group	Nominated
1975	"The Pill"	Best Country Vocal Performance, Female	Nominated
1976	"The Letter" (with Conway Twitty)	Best Country Vocal Performance by a Duo or Group	Nominated
1977	Dynamic Duo (with Conway Twitty)	Best Country Vocal Performance by a Duo or Group	Nominated
1988	"Honky Tonk Angels Medley" (with k.d. lang, Brenda Lee and Kitty Wells)	Best Country Vocal Collaboration	Nominated
1994	"Silver Threads and Golden Needles" (with Dolly Parton and Tammy Wynette)	Best Country Vocal Collaboration	Nominated
2004	"Portland, Oregon" (with Jack White)	Best Country Vocal Collaboration	Won
2004	"Portland, Oregon" (with Jack White)	Best Country Song	Nominated
2004	"Miss Being Mrs."	Best Country Song	Nominated
2004	"Miss Being Mrs."	Best Female Country Vocal Performance	Nominated
2004	Van Lear Rose	Best Country Album	Won
2010	Loretta Lynn	Lifetime Achievement Award	Won
2016	Full Circle	Best Country Album	Nominated
2018	"Wouldn't It Be Great?"	Best Country Solo Performance	Nominated
