= All Time Greatest Hits (Loretta Lynn album) =

Greatest hits album by Loretta Lynn
- Released: May 23, 2002
- Recorded: February 26, 1964–February 3, 1978
- Genre: Country
- Length: 57:26
- Label: MCA
- Producer: Owen Bradley

Loretta Lynn chronology
Still Country (2000)	All Time Greatest Hits (2002)	Van Lear Rose (2004)

Professional ratings
Review scores
Source	Rating
AllMusic	4.5/5 stars

All Time Greatest Hits is a 2002 greatest hits album by country music artist Loretta Lynn.

In 2003, the album was ranked number 485 on Rolling Stone magazine's list of the 500 greatest albums of all time. In the updated 2012 list, the magazine raised its rank to 478, saying:

Anyone who thinks a woman singing country music is cute should listen to "Fist City," where Lynn threatens to beat down a woman if she doesn't lay off her man. Seventies greats like "Rated 'X'" and "The Pill" brought feminism to the honky-tonks.

== Track listing ==
1. "Wine Women and Song" - 2:03
2. "Happy Birthday" - 2:04
3. "You Ain't Woman Enough (To Take My Man)" - 2:13
4. "Don't Come Home A-Drinkin' (With Lovin' on Your Mind)" - 2:09
5. "Fist City" - 2:13
6. "You've Just Stepped In (From Stepping Out on Me)" - 2:19
7. "Woman of the World (Leave My World Alone)" - 2:56
8. "Coal Miner's Daughter" - 3:00
9. "After the Fire Is Gone" - 2:40
10. "Lead Me On" - 2:26
11. "One's on the Way" - 2:39
12. "Rated X" - 2:39
13. "Love Is the Foundation" - 2:31
14. "Louisiana Woman, Mississippi Man" - 2:32
15. "As Soon as I Hang Up the Phone" - 2:42
16. "Trouble in Paradise" - 2:10
17. "When the Tingle Becomes a Chill" - 3:02
18. "Feelins'" - 3:01
19. "Out of My Head and Back in My Bed" - 2:42
20. "Somebody Somewhere (Don't Know What He's Missin' Tonight)" - 3:03
21. "She's Got You" - 3:06
22. "I Can't Feel You Anymore" - 3:16

== Chart performance ==
Chart (2022)	Peak position
US Top Country Albums (Billboard)	42
