= List of Top Country LP's number ones of 1976 =

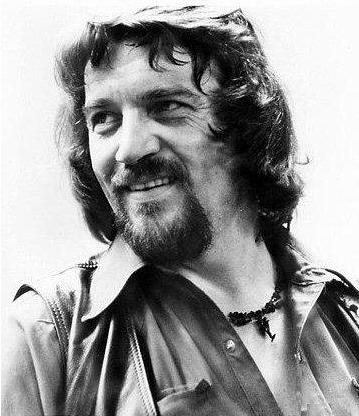
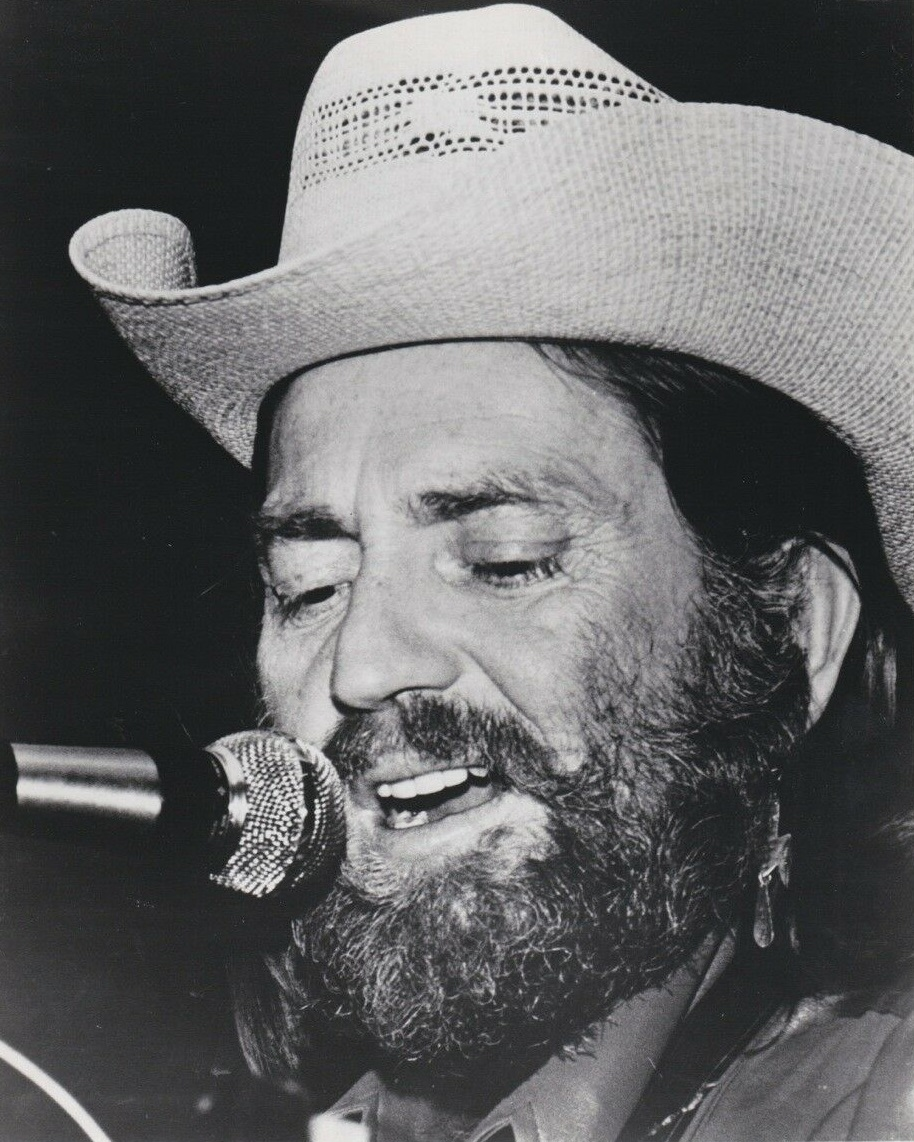
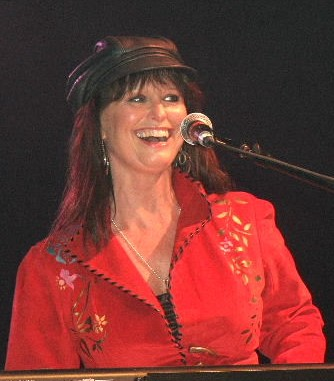
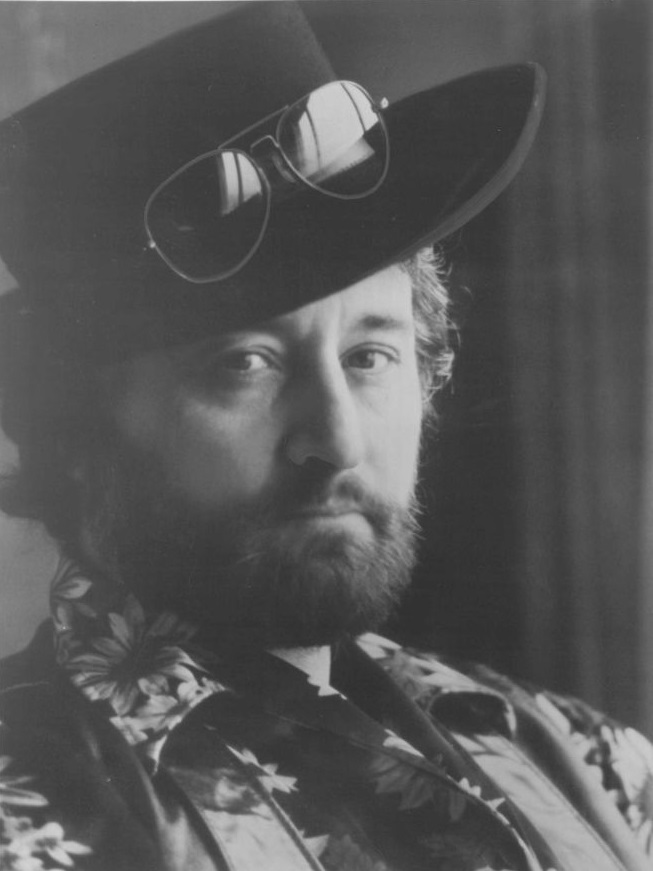
The album Wanted! The Outlaws, featuring Waylon Jennings, Willie Nelson, Jessi Colter and Tompall Glaser, spent six weeks at number one.

Top Country Albums is a chart that ranks the top-performing country music albums in the United States, published by Billboard. In 1976, 16 different albums topped the chart, which was at the time published under the title Top Country LP's, based on sales reports submitted by a representative sample of stores nationwide.

In the issue of Billboard dated January 3, C. W. McCall was at number one with his album Black Bear Road, its second week at number one. It would spend the first eight weeks of 1976 in the top spot before being displaced by the compilation album Wanted! The Outlaws, featuring tracks by Waylon Jennings, Willie Nelson, Jessi Colter and Tompall Glaser, which spent six weeks in the top spot. It was the first compilation album by various artists to top the country albums chart in its 12-year history, and the first country album to receive a platinum certification from the Recording Industry Association of America. The four artists were all associated with the outlaw country movement, which rejected the slick production values evident in popular country music of the early 1970s and added a rock music influence and a counterculture attitude. Both Jennings and Nelson also achieved solo number ones in 1976. Three weeks after Wanted! The Outlaws left the top spot, Nelson reached number one with The Sound in Your Mind, which would go on to spend eight weeks atop the chart. He would return to the top spot in November with The Troublemaker, which spent three weeks at number one, meaning that, even if the time which Wanted! The Outlaws spent atop the chart is disregarded due to its status as a compilation, he spent the most weeks at number one of any act. Jennings spent nine non-consecutive weeks at number one with Are You Ready for the Country, spanning from August to December.

In addition to Nelson, Loretta Lynn had two chart-toppers in 1976. She spent a single week at number one in December with Somebody Somewhere and the same length of time in the top spot in August with United Talent, a collaboration with Conway Twitty. The two singers had a run of success with duet recordings in the 1970s alongside their ongoing solo careers. Another album of male-female duets to reach number one was Golden Ring by George Jones and Tammy Wynette. The couple had divorced the previous year, but nonetheless continued to record together. Three future members of the Country Music Hall of Fame achieved their first number-one albums in 1976. In April, Emmylou Harris spent two weeks in the top spot with Elite Hotel, her first chart-topper. In June, Don Williams began a two-week run at number one with Harmony. Although he was extremely successful on the singles chart, achieving 17 number ones, it would prove to be his only chart-topping album. In November, Marty Robbins spent the only week atop the country albums chart of his career with El Paso City; his greatest period of popularity had come in the late 1950s and early 1960s, prior to the launch of the listing.

== Chart history ==
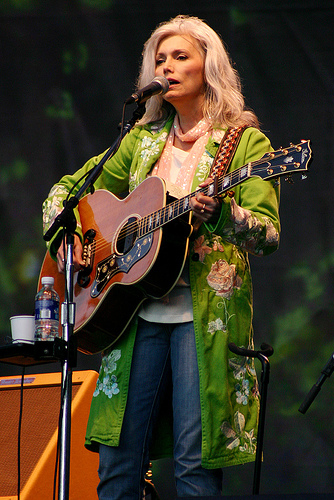
Emmylou Harris reached number one for the first time in 1976 with Elite Hotel.

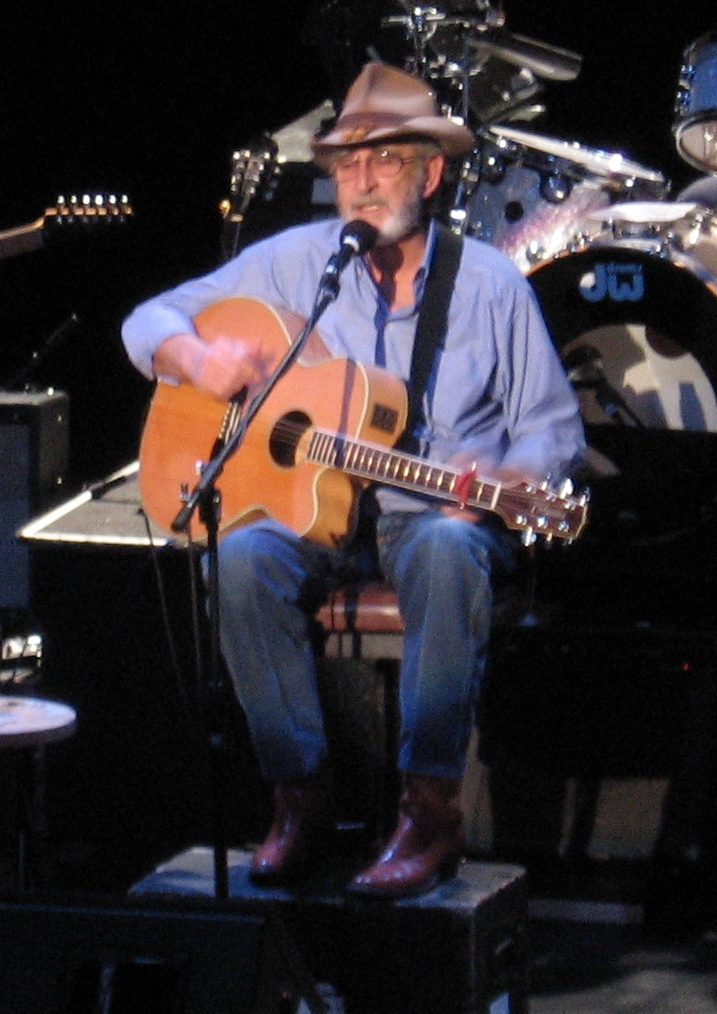
Don Williams achieved his only career number one with Harmony.

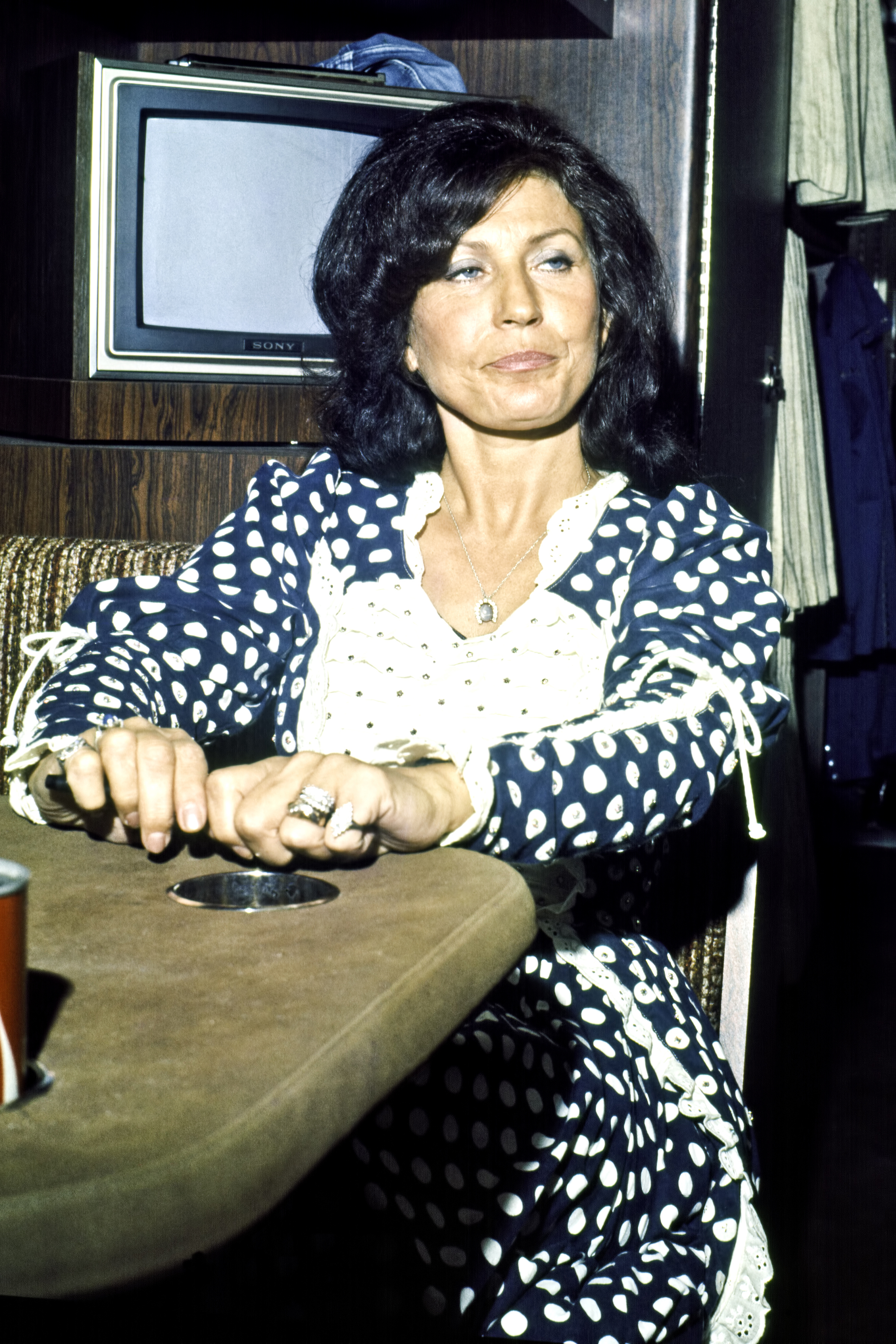
Loretta Lynn topped the chart with Somebody Somewhere, as well as United Talent, a collaboration with Conway Twitty.

Issue date	Title	Artist(s)	Ref.
January 3	Black Bear Road	C. W. McCall	
January 10	Black Bear Road	C. W. McCall	
January 17	Black Bear Road	C. W. McCall	
January 24	Black Bear Road	C. W. McCall	
January 31	Black Bear Road	C. W. McCall	
February 7	Black Bear Road	C. W. McCall	
February 14	Black Bear Road	C. W. McCall	
February 21	Black Bear Road	C. W. McCall	
February 28	Wanted! The Outlaws	Various Artists	
March 6	Wanted! The Outlaws	Various Artists	
March 13	Wanted! The Outlaws	Various Artists	
March 20	Wanted! The Outlaws	Various Artists	
March 27	Wanted! The Outlaws	Various Artists	
April 3	Wanted! The Outlaws	Various Artists	
April 10	Elite Hotel	Emmylou Harris	
April 17	Elite Hotel	Emmylou Harris	
April 24	The Sound in Your Mind	Willie Nelson	
May 1	It's All in the Movies	Merle Haggard	
May 8	The Sound in Your Mind	Willie Nelson	
May 15	The Sound in Your Mind	Willie Nelson	
May 22	The Sound in Your Mind	Willie Nelson	
May 29	The Sound in Your Mind	Willie Nelson	
June 5	The Sound in Your Mind	Willie Nelson	
June 12	The Sound in Your Mind	Willie Nelson	
June 19	The Sound in Your Mind	Willie Nelson	
June 26	Harmony	Don Williams	
July 3	Harmony	Don Williams	
July 10	From Elvis Presley Boulevard, Memphis, Tennessee	Elvis Presley	
July 17	From Elvis Presley Boulevard, Memphis, Tennessee	Elvis Presley	
July 24	From Elvis Presley Boulevard, Memphis, Tennessee	Elvis Presley	
July 31	From Elvis Presley Boulevard, Memphis, Tennessee	Elvis Presley	
August 7	United Talent	Conway Twitty and Loretta Lynn	
August 14	Are You Ready for the Country	Waylon Jennings	
August 21	Are You Ready for the Country	Waylon Jennings	
August 28	Teddy Bear	Red Sovine	
September 4	Are You Ready for the Country	Waylon Jennings	
September 11	Are You Ready for the Country	Waylon Jennings	
September 18	Are You Ready for the Country	Waylon Jennings	
September 25	Are You Ready for the Country	Waylon Jennings	
October 2	Hasten Down the Wind	Linda Ronstadt	
October 9	Hasten Down the Wind	Linda Ronstadt	
October 16	Are You Ready for the Country	Waylon Jennings	
October 23	Hasten Down the Wind	Linda Ronstadt	
October 30	Golden Ring	George Jones and Tammy Wynette	
November 6	Here's Some Love	Tanya Tucker	
November 13	El Paso City	Marty Robbins	
November 20	The Troublemaker	Willie Nelson	
November 27	The Troublemaker	Willie Nelson	
December 4	The Troublemaker	Willie Nelson	
December 11	Somebody Somewhere	Loretta Lynn	
December 18	Are You Ready for the Country	Waylon Jennings	
December 25	Are You Ready for the Country	Waylon Jennings	
