= 12th Academy of Country Music Awards =

US music awards ceremony in 1977

- Date: February 24, 1977
- Location: Shrine Auditorium, Los Angeles, California
- Hosted by: Pat Boone; Patti Page; Jerry Reed

Highlights
- Most wins: Mickey Gilley (5)
- Most nominations: Mickey Gilley; Loretta Lynn (6 each)

Television/radio coverage
- Network: ABC

The 12th Academy of Country Music Awards ceremony was held on February 24, 1977, at the Shrine Auditorium, Los Angeles, California. It was hosted by Pat Boone, Patti Page and Jerry Reed.

== Winners and nominees ==
Winners are shown in bold.

Entertainer of the Year	Top Male Vocalist of the Year
**Mickey Gilley**; Loretta Lynn; Marty Robbins; Mel Tillis; Conway Twitty	**Mickey Gilley**; Tom Bresh; Marty Robbins; Mel Tillis; Conway Twitty
Top Female Vocalist of the Year	Top Vocal Group of the Year
**Crystal Gayle**; Emmylou Harris; Loretta Lynn; Dolly Parton; Tammy Wynette	**Conway Twitty** **and** **Loretta Lynn**; Dave & Sugar; Waylon Jennings and Willie Nelson; George Jones and Tammy Wynette; Statler Brothers
Single Record of the Year	Song of the Year
**"Bring It On Home to Me"** — **Mickey Gilley**; "El Paso City" — Marty Robbins; "Good Hearted Woman" — Waylon Jennings; "Somebody Somewhere (Don't Know What He's Missin' Tonight)" — Loretta Lynn; "Teddy Bear" — Red Sovine	**"Don't the Girls All Get Prettier at Closing Time"** — **Baker Knight**; "Bring It On Home to Me" — Sam Cooke; "El Paso City" — Marty Robbins; "Somebody Somewhere (Don't Know What He's Missin' Tonight)" — Lola Jean Dillon; "Teddy Bear" — Billy Joe Burnette, Tommy Hill, Dale Royal, Red Sovine
Most Promising Male Vocalist	Most Promising Female Vocalist
**Moe Bandy**; Rex Allen Jr.; Billy "Crash" Craddock; Larry Gatlin; Johnny Lee	**Billie Jo Spears**; Dottsy; Mary Kay Place; Sunday Sharpe; Margo Smith
Album of the Year
**Gilley's Smoking — Mickey Gilley**; El Paso City — Marty Robbins; Now and Then — Conway Twitty; Somebody Somewhere — Loretta Lynn; Wanted! The Outlaws — Waylon Jennings, Willie Nelson, Jessi Colter, Tompall Glaser
Pioneer Award
**Owen Bradley**
