= Somebody Somewhere =

Somebody Somewhere can refer to:

- Somebody Somewhere (album), a 1976 album by Loretta Lynn
- Somebody Somewhere (book), 1994 book about autism by Donna Williams
- Somebody Somewhere (1956 song), a 1956 popular song by Frank Loesser
- Somebody Somewhere (Dallas Smith song), a 2011 song by Dallas Smith
- Somebody Somewhere (TV series), comedy series starring Bridget Everett
- Somebody Somewhere (Don't Know What He's Missin' Tonight), a 1976 song by Loretta Lynn
- Somebody Somewhere, a 2000 song by Moloko from the album Things to Make and Do
