= Dynamic Duo (Conway Twitty and Loretta Lynn album) =

Studio album by Conway Twitty and Loretta Lynn
- Released: June 6, 1977
- Recorded: March 7, 1973–March 17, 1977
- Studio: Bradley's Barn, Mount Juliet, Tennessee
- Genre: Country
- Length: 28:17
- Label: MCA
- Producer: Owen Bradley

Conway Twitty and Loretta Lynn chronology
United Talent (1976)	Dynamic Duo (1977)	Honky Tonk Heroes (1978)

Conway Twitty chronology
Play, Guitar Play (1977)	Dynamic Duo (1977)	I've Already Loved You in My Mind (1977)

Loretta Lynn chronology
I Remember Patsy (1977)	Dynamic Duo (1977)	Out of My Head and Back in My Bed (1978)

Singles from United Talent
- 1. "I Can't Love You Enough" Released: May 16, 1977

Dynamic Duo is the seventh collaborative studio album by Conway Twitty and Loretta Lynn. It was released on June 6, 1977, by MCA Records.

== Critical reception ==
The June 18, 1977 issue of Billboard featured a review which said, "Country music's red hot duo, Lynn and Twitty, have their summer offering — another tightly produced package that matches the personalities and voices of these two talents. An interesting assortment of songs ranges from the lively Hank Williams classic, "Hey, Good Lookin'" to their fast rising new single, "I Can't Love You Enough" to the old R&B hit, "Soulshake". A typical Owen Bradley Production of Twitty/Lynn relies heavily on steel guitar, solid bass beat, and the ever-present fiddles. For some recon, the cover photo of Twitty and Lynn is blurred. The music's sharp, though, and will have loads of airplay and sales." The review noted "I Can't Love You Enough", "We're Much Too Close", "Hey, Good Lookin'", "Where Old Love Gathers Dust", and "Soulshake" as the best cuts on the album, with a note to record dealers that the "consistent top selling artists are back with another hot one."

Cashbox published a review in the June 18, 1977 issue saying that "Conway and Loretta get down like teenagers on a first date. Hot tracks and vocal performances, especially on "I Can't Love You Enough", "Get It On", and "Soulshake," rival any bubblegum revue. Even adult material like "Hide and Seek" and "Where Old Loves Gather Dust" are vibrant. A must for anyone who thinks country music is stodgy."

== Commercial performance ==
The album peaked at No. 3 on the US Billboard Hot Country LP's chart, becoming the duo's seventh consecutive album to peak in the top 5.

The album's only single, "I Can't Love You Enough", was released in May 1977 and peaked at No. 2 on the Billboard Hot Country Singles chart, the duo's seventh single to peak in the top 5. In Canada, the single peaked at No. 1 on the RPM Country Singles chart, their fifth chart topping song on the chart.

== Recording ==
Recording sessions for the album took place at Bradley's Barn in Mount Juliet, Tennessee, on March 8, 15–17, 1977. Two songs on the album were from previous recording sessions. "Hide and Seek" was recorded on March 7, 1973, during a session for 1973's Louisiana Woman, Mississippi Man. "Where Old Loves Gather Dust" was recorded during the April 1, 1975 session for 1975's Feelins'.

== Track listing ==
Side one
No.	Title	Writer(s)	Recording date	Length
1.	"I Can't Love You Enough"	Troy Seals; Max D. Barnes	March 8, 1977	2:52
2.	"We're Much Too Close"	Seals; Barnes	March 17, 1977	2:53
3.	"Soulshake"	Mira Smith; Margaret Lewis	March 16, 1977	2:36
4.	"The Bed I'm Dreaming On"	Lola Jean Dillon	March 16, 1977	2:46
5.	"Hey, Good Lookin'"	Hank Williams	March 15, 1977	2:31

Side two
No.	Title	Writer(s)	Recording date	Length
1.	"Get It On"	Raymond A. Smith	March 8, 1977	2:37
2.	"Where Old Loves Gather Dust"	Bobby Harden	April 1, 1975	2:40
3.	"We Can Try It One More Time"	Bill Rhodes; Rayburn Anthony	March 15, 1977	3:24
4.	"Hide and Seek"	L. E. White	March 7, 1973	2:52
5.	"You Could Know as Much About a Stranger"	Nadine Bryant	March 17, 1977	3:06

== Charts ==
=== Album ===
Chart (1977)	Peak chart position
US Hot Country LP's (Billboard)	3

=== Singles ===
Title	Year	Peak chart position	
Title	Year	US Country	CAN Country
"I Can't Love You Enough"	1977	2	1
