= Out of My Head and Back in My Bed =

Out of My Head and Back in My Bed may refer to:

- Out of My Head and Back in My Bed (song), a 1977 song by Loretta Lynn
- Out of My Head and Back in My Bed (album), a 1978 album by Loretta Lynn
