= Out of My Head and Back in My Bed (album) =

Studio album by Loretta Lynn
- Released: February 13, 1978
- Recorded: Jun. 12, 1975–Dec. 10, 1976
- Studio: Bradley's Barn, Mount Juliet, Tennessee
- Genre: Country
- Length: 25:46
- Label: MCA Records
- Producer: Owen Bradley

Loretta Lynn chronology
Dynamic Duo (1977)	Out of My Head and Back in My Bed (1978)	Honky Tonk Heroes (1978)

Singles from Out of My Head and Back in My Bed
- 1. "Out of My Head and Back in My Bed" Released: November 14, 1977; 2. "Spring Fever" Released: May 8, 1978

Out of My Head and Back in My Bed is the thirtieth solo studio album by American country music singer-songwriter Loretta Lynn. It was released on February 13, 1978, by MCA Records.

== Commercial performance ==
The album peaked at No. 16 on the Billboard Top Country Albums chart. The album's first single, "Out of My Head and Back in My Bed", peaked at No. 1 on the Billboard Hot Country Songs chart, Lynn's eleventh solo single to top the chart. The second single, "Spring Fever", peaked at No. 12.

== Recording ==
Recording sessions for the album took place at Bradley's Barn in Mount Juliet, TN. There were no sessions held specifically for this album. The earliest recording featured on the album, "His Lovin' Told Me He Was Gone", was recorded on June 12, 1975, during a session for 1976's When the Tingle Becomes a Chill. "Out of My Head and Back in My Bed" was recorded during the June 28, 1976 session for 1976's Somebody Somewhere. Six songs on the album were recorded during sessions for 1977's I Remember Patsy: "Old Rooster" on September 28, 1976; "Spring Fever", "The Dead Is a Risin'", "Black-Eyed Peas and Blue-Eyed Babies" and "God Bless the Children" on December 1, 1976; and "Three Riddles" on December 10, 1976. "You Snap Your Fingers (And I'm Back in Your Hands)" and "I'm Gonna Do Somebody Right' were the first songs released from the September 29, 1976 session.

== Track listing ==
Side one
No.	Title	Writer(s)	Recording date	Length
1.	"Out of My Head and Back in My Bed"	Peggy Forman	June 28, 1976	2:40
2.	"Three Riddles"	John Adrian	December 10, 1976	3:09
3.	"Spring Fever"	Lola Jean Dillon	December 1, 1976	2:40
4.	"The Dead Is a Risin'"	Ken Jones	December 1, 1976	2:24
5.	"Old Rooster"	Tracey Lee	September 28, 1976	2:26

Side two
No.	Title	Writer(s)	Recording date	Length
1.	"Black-Eyed Peas and Blue-Eyed Babies"	Susie McCoy	December 1, 1976	2:27
2.	"You Snap Your Fingers (And I'm Back in Your Hands)"	John Schweers	September 29, 1976	2:39
3.	"His Lovin' Told Me He Was Gone"	Black Mevis, William C. Hall, Bill Haynes	June 12, 1975	2:31
4.	"I'm Gonna Do Somebody Right"	Casey Kelly, Julie Didier	September 29, 1976	2:22
5.	"God Bless the Children"	Dallas Cody	December 1, 1976	2:28

== Chart positions ==
Album – Billboard (North America)

Year	Chart	Peak position
1978	Country Albums	16

Singles – Billboard (North America)

Year	Single	Chart	Peak position
1977	"Out of My Head and Back in My Bed"	Country Singles	1
1978	"Spring Fever"	Country Singles	12

== Personnel ==
- Owen Bradley – producer
- Joe Mills – engineer
- Bobby Bradley – engineer
- Bud Gray – photographer
- Larry Boden – mastering engineer
- The Jordanaires – backing vocals
- The Nashville Sounds – backing vocals
