= Country in My Genes =

Single by Loretta Lynn

from the album Still Country
- B-side: "I'm a Honky Tonk Girl"
- Released: June 16, 2000
- Recorded: 2000
- Studio: Scruggs Sound (Berry Hill, Tennessee)
- Genre: Country; traditional country
- Length: 3:10
- Label: Audium; Koch
- Songwriter(s): Larry Cordle; Betty Key; Larry Shell
- Producer(s): Randy Scruggs

Loretta Lynn singles chronology
"Silver Threads and Golden Needles" (1993)	"Country in My Genes" (2000)	"I Can't Hear the Music" (2001)

"Country in My Genes" is a song written by Larry Cordle, Betty Key and Larry Shell. It was recorded by American country artist Loretta Lynn and released on Audium and Koch Records in 2000. It was the lead single off of Lynn's album, Still Country. It was the first single Lynn had released since the mid-1990s and was her first to charting single since that time period. The song was given positive reviews from critics and writers.

== Background and content ==
"Country in My Genes" was among Lynn's first recordings since the death of her husband in 1996, Oliver "Doolittle" Lynn. She had recently returned to touring and performing. The song was composed by Larry Cordle, Betty Key and Larry Shell. It had been inspired by a concert performance. Both writers had observed Lynn performing wrote the track based on a conversation she had with the audience about being from the country. Lynn later commented on the composition in an interview with Billboard: "Everything I said on stage is what he put in that record. I said, 'You wrote my show didn't you?' He said, 'I sure did'." "Country in My Genes" was recorded in the spring of 2000 at the Scruggs Sound Studio, located in Berry Hill, Tennessee. The song was produced by Randy Scruggs, who also produced Lynn's upcoming album. It was Lynn's first collaboration with Scruggs.

== Release and reception ==
"Country in My Genes" received a positive reception from music writers and reviewers. Dan MacIntosh reviewed the song after watching Lynn perform in concert. He believed the song advocated for the country genre to return to more traditional sounds and styles. "'Country In My Genes,' which its attack on the sorry state of modern country music reads like a witness to the trial of the murder on Music Row," he wrote. When reviewing her Still Country album, Zac Johnson of Allmusic commented on the song's sound and style. He felt the single carried "the traditional country torch while managing to stay current."

== Release and chart performance ==
"Country in My Genes" was released as the album's lead single on June 16, 2000. It was issued as a single via Audium Records and Koch Records." The single release included the original recording of Lynn's "I'm a Honky Tonk Girl" to celebrate 40 years of her recording career. After its release, the song had received a positive response from several radio stations, according to Billboard. "Our audience is absolutely responding to it. It's so Loretta," said John Malone of WSM radio.

"Country in My Genes" was Lynn's first single since 1993's "Silver Threads and Golden Needles" (a duet with Dolly Parton and Tammy Wynette). The track was also Lynn's 78th single to chart on the Billboard Hot Country Songs chart and her first solo single to chart since 1988's "Who Was That Stranger." It spent one week on the country songs list, reaching number 72 in September 2000. A music video was later released that featured several other country artists of the era: Crystal Gayle, Martina McBride, Reba McEntire, Brad Paisley, Randy Scruggs and Chely Wright.

== Track listing ==
CD single

- "I'm a Honky Tonk Girl" – 2:14
- A message from Loretta Lynn – 0:32
- "Country in My Genes" – 3:10

== Chart performance ==
Chart (2000)	Peak position
US Hot Country Songs (Billboard)	72
