= Home (Loretta Lynn album) =

Studio album by Loretta Lynn
- Released: August 11, 1975
- Recorded: March 5, 1974–June 20, 1975
- Studio: Bradley's Barn, Mount Juliet, Tennessee
- Genre: Country
- Length: 26:20
- Label: MCA
- Producer: Owen Bradley

Loretta Lynn chronology
Feelins' (1975)	Home (1975)	On the Road with Loretta and the Coal Miners (1976)

Singles from Home
- 1. "Home" Released: July 14, 1975

Home is the twenty-sixth solo studio album by American country music singer-songwriter Loretta Lynn. It was released on August 11, 1975, by MCA Records.

== Critical reception ==
In the issue dated August 23, 1975, Billboard published a review that said, "If it's Loretta, it's got to be great, and this is no exception. It seems that, with every session, she discovers there are more things she can do with her versatility, and she proceeds to do them. She sings a great number of tunes already done by others, but simply shows that she can hold her own in the competition. Greatness with Loretta is more than an implication." The review noted "You Take Me to Heaven Every Night", "No Place Else to Go", and "Bring Some of It Home" as the best cuts on the album, with a note to record dealers that said, "On the cover is a country girl; on the back cover is a mansion. Both belong to Loretta."

== Commercial performance ==
The album peaked at No. 7 on the Billboard Top Country Albums chart. The album's single, "Home", peaked at No. 10 on the Billboard Hot Country Songs chart.

== Recording ==
Recording sessions for the album took place on June 10, June 11 and June 20, 1975, at Bradley's Barn studio in Mount Juliet, Tennessee. Four songs on the album were from previous recording sessions. "Home" and "He's Only Everything" were the first songs to be released from an October 8, 1974 session. "Bring Some of It Home" was recorded on March 5, 1974, during a session for 1974's They Don't Make 'Em Like My Daddy. "No Place Else to Go" was recorded during the December 19, 1974 session for 1975's Back to the Country.

== Track listing ==
Side one
No.	Title	Writer(s)	Recording date	Length
1.	"Home"	Bobby Harden	October 8, 1974	2:10
2.	"Before the Next Teardrop Falls"	Ben Peters, Vivian Keith	June 11, 1975	2:46
3.	"The Window Up Above"	George Jones	June 11, 1975	2:40
4.	"(Hey Won't You Play) Another Somebody Done Somebody Wrong Song"	Larry Butler, Chips Moman	June 10, 1975	2:58
5.	"You Take Me to Heaven Every Night"	Jimmy Peppers	June 20, 1974	2:44

Side two
No.	Title	Writer(s)	Recording date	Length
1.	"Wrong Road Again"	Allen Reynolds	June 10, 1975	2:21
2.	"Always Wanting You"	Merle Haggard	June 10, 1975	2:47
3.	"No Place Else to Go"	Shel Silverstein	December 19, 1974	2:48
4.	"He's Only Everything"	Faron Young, Billy Deaton	October 8, 1974	2:42
5.	"Bring Some of It Home"	Lola Jean Dillon	March 5, 1974	2:31

== Personnel ==
Adapted from album liner notes.

- Harold Bradley – bass guitar
- Owen Bradley – producer
- Ray Edenton – guitar
- Johnny Gimble – fiddle
- Lloyd Green – steel guitar
- The Jordanaires – backing vocals
- Mike Leech – bass
- Kenny Malone – drums
- Grady Martin – guitar
- Charlie McCoy – harmonica/vibes
- Hargus "Pig" Robbins – piano
- Hal Rugg – steel guitar
- Jerry Smith – piano
- Pete Wade – guitar

== Chart positions ==
Album – Billboard (North America)

Year	Chart	Peak position
1975	Country Albums	7

Singles – Billboard (North America)

Year	Single	Chart	Peak position
1975	"Home"	Country Singles	10
