= God Bless America Again (song) =

1976 single by Conway Twitty and Loretta Lynn

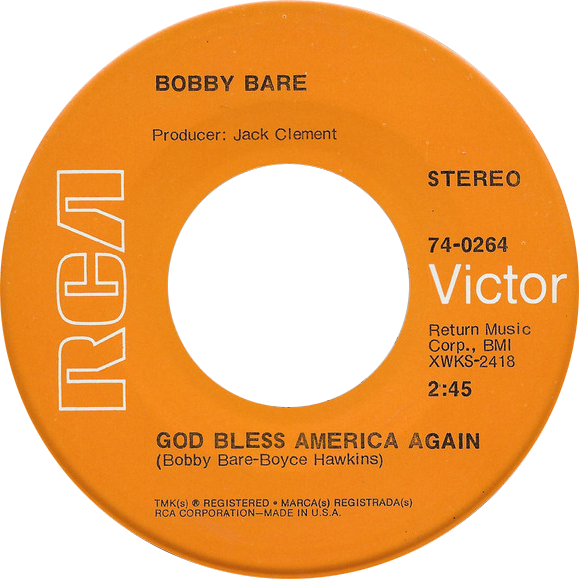
- Side A of the US single

Single by Bobby Bare
- B-side: "Baby, What Else Can I Do"
- Released: November 1969
- Genre: Country
- Length: 2:45
- Label: RCA Nashville
- Songwriters: Bobby Bare, Boyce Hawkins
- Producer: Jack Clement

Bobby Bare singles chronology
"Which One Will It Be" (1969)	"God Bless America Again" (1969)	"Your Husband, My Wife" (1970)

"God Bless America Again"

Single by Conway Twitty and Loretta Lynn

from the album United Talent
- A-side: "The Letter"
- Released: June 1976
- Recorded: April 15, 1976
- Studio: Bradley's Barn, Mt. Juliet, Tennessee
- Genre: Country
- Length: 3:14
- Label: MCA 40572
- Songwriters: Bobby Bare, Boyce Hawkins
- Producer: Owen Bradley

Conway Twitty and Loretta Lynn singles chronology
"Feelins'" (1975)	"The Letter" / "God Bless America Again" (1976)	"I Can't Love You Enough" (1977)

"God Bless America Again" is a country music song written by Bobby Bare and Boyce Hawkins. A patriotic hymn pleading for God's forgiveness of the United States and his guidance over the country, the song was first recorded and made famous by Bare. Released as a single in 1969, Bare's version reached No. 16 on the Billboard Hot Country Singles chart.

== Chart performance ==
Chart (1969–1970)	Peak position
U.S. Billboard Hot Country Singles	16

== Cover versions ==
Many artists recorded "God Bless America Again" through the years, including Jan Howard, Jim & Jesse, Billy Preston, Tex Ritter, Floyd Van Laningham, Dee Vickery, Ray Charles and Bob Whitlock.

Also recording a cover version were Conway Twitty and Loretta Lynn, whose duet recording was the B-side to their No. 3 country hit "The Letter". The Twitty-Lynn version, released in 1976, featured Twitty speaking the verses while Lynn sang the refrain. The Twitty-Lynn version was played during the closing credits in the 2012 HBO made-for-TV movie Game Change about Sarah Palin's role in the 2008 Presidential Election, which she and John McCain lost. Tex Ritter's version was featured in the opening sequences of the film Canadian Bacon.

The Charlie Daniels Band's 1980 Southern rock song "In America" quotes "God Bless America Again" and likewise deals with a struggling United States getting back in God's favor.
