= Home (Loretta Lynn song) =

Single by Loretta Lynn

from the album Home
- B-side: "My Kind of Man"
- Released: July 1975
- Recorded: March 5, 1974
- Studio: Bradley's Barn, Mt. Juliet, Tennessee
- Genre: Country
- Length: 2:10
- Label: MCA
- Songwriter: Bobby Harden
- Producer: Owen Bradley

Loretta Lynn singles chronology
"The Pill" (1975)	"Home" (1975)	"When the Tingle Becomes a Chill" (1975)

"Home" is a song written by Bobby Harden that was originally performed by American country music artist Loretta Lynn. It was released as a single in July 1975 via MCA Records.

== Background and reception ==
"Home" was recorded at Bradley's Barn studio in Mount Juliet, Tennessee on March 5, 1974. The recording session was produced by the studio's owner, renowned country music producer Owen Bradley. Three additional tracks were recorded during this session.

"Home" reached number ten on the Billboard Hot Country Singles survey in 1975. Additionally, the song peaked at number five on the Canadian RPM Country Songs chart during this same period. It was included on her studio album, Home (1975).

== Track listings ==
7" vinyl single

- "Home" – 2:10
- "You Take Me to Heaven Every Night" – 2:44

== Charts ==
=== Weekly charts ===
Chart (1975)	Peak position
Canada Country Songs (RPM)	5
US Hot Country Singles (Billboard)	10
