= Honky Tonk Heroes (Conway Twitty and Loretta Lynn album) =

Studio album by Conway Twitty and Loretta Lynn
- Released: June 26, 1978
- Recorded: March 6, 1973–March 15, 1978
- Studio: Bradley's Barn, Mount Juliet, Tennessee
- Genre: Country
- Length: 25:37
- Label: MCA
- Producer: Owen Bradley

Conway Twitty and Loretta Lynn chronology
Dynamic Duo (1977)	Honky Tonk Heroes (1978)	Diamond Duet (1980)

Conway Twitty chronology
Georgia Keeps Pulling On My Ring (1978)	Honky Tonk Heroes (1978)	Conway (1978)

Loretta Lynn chronology
Out of My Head and Back in My Bed (1978)	Honky Tonk Heroes (1978)	We've Come a Long Way, Baby (1979)

Singles from Honky Tonk Heroes
- 1. "From Seven Till Ten" Released: June 5, 1978

Honky Tonk Heroes is the eighth collaborative studio album by Conway Twitty and Loretta Lynn. It was released on June 26, 1978, by MCA Records.

== Critical reception ==
Billboard's review of the album in the July 8, 1978 issue said, "Twitty and Lynn release their annual duet LP that includes some of the couple's latest singles, plus some new numbers that fans will hear for the first time. Instrumentation is straight country—with a bouncy, prominent bass line, frequent burst of harmonica and a surplus of guitar: lead, bass, rhythm, and steel. Similar talents and philosophies make for a comfortable pairing for Lynn and Twitty, both on stage and on record." The review noted "I've Already Loved You in My Mind", "How High Can You Build a Fire", "You're the Reason Our Kids Are Ugly", "We've Made It Legal", and "Live It Up" as the best cuts on the album, with a note to album dealers to "expect sales to be consistently strong."

== Commercial performance ==
The album peaked at No. 8 on the US Billboard Hot Country LP's chart, becoming the duo's eighth consecutive album to peak in the top 10, as well as their lowest position on the chart at the time. In Canada, the album peaked at No. 2 on the RPM Country Albums chart.

The album's only single, "From Seven Till Ten", was released in June 1978 and peaked at No. 6 on the US Billboard Hot Country Singles chart, the duo's eighth single to peak in the top 10, but also their lowest position on the chart at the time. In Canada, the single peaked at No. 2 on the RPM Country Singles chart. It was backed with "You're the Reason Our Kids Are Ugly."

== Recording ==
Recording sessions for the album took place on March 8, 14 and 15, 1978, at Bradley's Barn in Mount Juliet, Tennessee. Three songs on the album were from previous recording sessions. "We've Made It Legal" was recorded on March 6, 1973, during a session for 1973's Louisiana Woman, Mississippi Man. Two songs were from sessions for 1977's Dynamic Duo, "From Seven Till Ten" was recorded on March 15, 1977, and "How High Can You Build a Fire" was recorded on March 16, 1977.

== Track listing ==
Side one
No.	Title	Writer(s)	Recording date	Length
1.	"From Seven Till Ten"	Troy Seals; Max D. Barnes	March 15, 1977	2:40
2.	"I've Already Loved You in My Mind"	Conway Twitty	March 8, 1978	2:45
3.	"The Last of It All"	L. E. White; Lola Jean Dillon	March 14, 1978	2:26
4.	"How High Can You Build a Fire"	John Riggs	March 16, 1977	2:19
5.	"Fire of Two Old Flames"	Seals; Barnes	March 8, 1978	2:50

Side two
No.	Title	Writer(s)	Recording date	Length
1.	"You're the Reason Our Kids Are Ugly"	White; Lola Jean Dillon	March 14, 1978	2:29
2.	"We've Made It Legal"	Marie Wilson; Sudie Calloway; Lorene Mann	March 6, 1973	2:24
3.	"How Can You Keep from Lovin' (A Woman Like That)"	Dean Sanford; Barnes	March 15, 1978	2:18
4.	"Live It Up"	Norris Wilson; Ross Faith; Pal Rakes	March 15, 1978	2:41
5.	"Country Blues"	Marilyn Allyn; Joel Sonnier	March 14, 1978	2:45

== Personnel ==
Adapted from the album liner notes.

- Bobby Bradley – engineer
- Harold Bradley – bass
- Owen Bradley – producer
- Larry Boden – mastering
- Carol Lee Cooper – backing vocals
- Ray Edenton – rhythm guitar
- Johnny Gimble – fiddle
- John Hughey – steel guitar
- The Jordanaires – backing vocals
- Tommy "Porkchop" Markham – drums
- Grady Martin – lead guitar
- Charlie McCoy – harmonica
- Joe Mills – engineer
- Bob Moore – bass
- The Nashville Sounds – backing vocals
- Hargus "Pig" Robbins – piano
- L. E. White – backing vocals

== Charts ==
=== Album ===
Chart (1978)	Peak chart position
US Hot Country LP's (Billboard)	8
Canada Country Albums (RPM)	2

=== Singles ===
Title	Year	Peak chart position	
Title	Year	US Country	CAN Country
"From Seven Till Ten"	1978	6	2
