= United Talent =

Studio album by Conway Twitty and Loretta Lynn
- Released: June 7, 1976
- Recorded: April 5, 1973–April 15, 1976
- Studio: Bradley's Barn, Mount Juliet, Tennessee
- Genre: Country
- Length: 24:42
- Label: MCA
- Producer: Owen Bradley

Conway Twitty and Loretta Lynn chronology
Feelins' (1975)	United Talent (1976)	Dynamic Duo (1977)

Conway Twitty chronology
Now and Then (1976)	United Talent (1976)	Play, Guitar Play (1977)

Loretta Lynn chronology
When the Tingle Becomes a Chill (1976)	United Talent (1976)	Somebody Somewhere (1976)

Singles from United Talent
- 1. "The Letter" Released: May 31, 1976

Professional ratings
Review scores
Source	Rating
Allmusic	2/5 stars

United Talent is the sixth collaborative studio album by Conway Twitty and Loretta Lynn. It was released on June 7, 1976, by MCA Records.

== Critical reception ==
The June 19, 1976 issue of Billboard carried a review which called the album "Another set of solid country songs from this favorite twosome, includes their latest single, "The Letter". Owen Bradley produces with his usual flair and a preference for unadulterated arrangements. Lynn and Twitty always seem to bring out the best in each other — and the cross-fertilization of talent sounds best on numbers such as "Just Lead the Way". It's doubtful if the Bellamy Brothers' hit "Let Your Love Flow" will ever sound more country than it does at the hands of Loretta and Conway. Lynn and Twitty make no concessions here for any pop audience — it's country to the core as typified by Wayne Kemp's "Barroom Habits" and Vic McAlpin's "I'm Gonna Roll You Like a Wheel". The review noted "The Letter", "Just Lead the Way", "Barroom Habits", "I'm Gonna Roll You Like a Wheel", and "We'll Finish Up Falling In Love" as the best cuts on the album, with a note to dealers saying that Twitty and Lynn are "an ever-popular duo with a loyal legion of fans."

Cashbox published a review in the June 26, 1976 issue, which called the album "An excellent vehicle conveying the award-winning sound of two of country music’s greatest." The review also noted "Just Lead the Way" and "We’re Caught Between a Love and a Love Affair" as their favorites.

== Commercial performance ==
The album peaked at No. 1 on the US Billboard Hot Country LP's chart, the duo's fourth consecutive album to top the chart.

The album's only single, "The Letter", was released in May 1976 and peaked at No. 3 on the US Billboard Hot Country Singles chart, the duo's first single to not top the chart. However, in Canada, the single peaked at No. 1 on the RPM Country Singles chart, the duo's fourth chart-topping song in that country.

== Recording ==
Recording sessions for the album took place on April 13–15, 1976, at Bradley's Barn in Mount Juliet, Tennessee. "I'm Gonna Roll You Like a Wheel" was recorded on April 5, 1973, during a session for 1973's Louisiana Woman, Mississippi Man.

== Track listing ==
Side one
No.	Title	Writer(s)	Recording date	Length
1.	"The Letter"	Charles Haney; Conway Twitty	April 15, 1976	2:53
2.	"Just Lead the Way"	Jimmie Peters; Mark McNair	April 13, 1976	2:16
3.	"Let Your Love Flow"	Larry E. Williams	April 15, 1976	2:35
4.	"God Bless America Again"	Bobby Bare; Boyce Hawkins	April 15, 1976	3:14
5.	"Run Through the Wringer"	Gail Bingham; Olen Bingham	April 14, 1976	2:29

Side two
No.	Title	Writer(s)	Recording date	Length
1.	"Barroom Habits"	Wayne Kemp	April 13, 1976	2:28
2.	"We're Caught Between a Love and a Love Affair"	L. E. White; Lola Jean Dillon	April 14, 1976	2:15
3.	"I'm Gonna Roll You Like a Wheel"	Vic McAlpin	April 5, 1973	2:00
4.	"We'll Finish Up Falling in Love"	Gene Dobbins; Johnny Wilson	April 14, 1976	2:02
5.	"The Only Way Around It (Is Right Through the Middle)"	Bobby L. Harden	April 13, 1976	2:30

== Charts ==
=== Album ===
Chart (1976)	Peak chart position
US Hot Country LP's (Billboard)	1

=== Singles ===
Title	Year	Peak chart position	
Title	Year	US Country	CAN Country
"The Letter"	1976	3	1
