= When the Tingle Becomes a Chill =

Studio album by Loretta Lynn
- Released: February 2, 1976
- Recorded: Mar. 5, 1973–Oct. 1, 1975
- Studio: Bradley's Barn, Mount Juliet, Tennessee
- Genre: Country
- Length: 26:15
- Label: MCA
- Producer: Owen Bradley

Loretta Lynn chronology
On the Road with Loretta and the Coal Miners (1976)	When the Tingle Becomes a Chill (1976)	United Talent (1976)

Singles from When the Tingle Becomes a Chill
- 1. "When the Tingle Becomes a Chill" Released: October 27, 1975; 2. "Red, White and Blue" Released: March 22, 1976

Professional ratings
Review scores
Source	Rating
Christgau's Record Guide	B

When the Tingle Becomes a Chill is the twenty-seventh solo studio album by American country music singer-songwriter Loretta Lynn. It was released on February 2, 1976, by MCA Records.

== Commercial performance ==
The album peaked at No. 6 on the Billboard Top Country Albums chart. The album's first single, "When the Tingle Becomes a Chill", peaked at No. 2 on the Billboard Hot Country Songs chart. The second single, "Red, White and Blue", peaked at No. 20.

== Recording ==
Recording sessions for the album took place at Bradley's Barn in Mount Juliet, Tennessee, on January 30, July 11 and October 1, 1975. "Red, White and Blue" is the only song that has ever been released from the January 30, 1975 session. A total of five songs were from previous recording sessions. "Turn Me Anyway But Loose" and "Leaning on Your Love" were recorded during sessions for 1973's Love Is the Foundation on March 5 and May 31, 1973, respectively. Two songs were from sessions for 1974's They Don't Make 'Em Like My Daddy, "You Love You" was recorded on March 5, 1973, and "When the Tingle Becomes a Chill" was recorded on August 29, 1974. "All I Want from You Is Away" was recorded on December 19, 1974, during a session for 1975's Back to the Country.

== Track listing ==
Side one
No.	Title	Writer(s)	Recording date	Length
1.	"When the Tingle Becomes a Chill"	Lola Jean Dillon	August 29, 1974	3:01
2.	"You Love You"	Jerry Chestnut	March 5, 1974	2:52
3.	"Leaning on Your Love"	Ben Peters	May 31, 1973	2:40
4.	"All I Want from You Is Away"	Bobby Harden	December 19, 1974	2:13
5.	"Red, White and Blue"	Loretta Lynn	January 30, 1975	2:14

Side two
No.	Title	Writer(s)	Recording date	Length
1.	"Rhinestone Cowboy"	Larry Weiss	October 1, 1975	3:07
2.	"Turn Me Anyway But Loose"	Kenton Riley, Randy Burnett	March 5, 1973	2:45
3.	"Daydreams About Night Things"	John Schweers	October 1, 1975	2:29
4.	"She'll Never Know"	Lorene Allen, Ray Buzzeo	July 11, 1975	2:50
5.	"Just Get Up and Close the Door"	Linda Hargrove	October 1, 1975	2:06

== Personnel ==
Adapted from album liner notes.

- Harold Bradley – bass
- Owen Bradley – producer
- Johnny Christopher – guitar
- Johnny Gimble – fiddle
- Lloyd Green – steel guitar
- The Jordanaires – backing vocals
- Mike Leech – bass
- Kenny Malone – drums
- Grady Martin – guitar
- Charlie McCoy – harmonica/vibes
- The Nashville Edition – backing vocals
- Hargus Robbins – piano
- Hal Rugg – steel guitar
- Pete Wade – guitar

== Chart positions ==
Album – Billboard (North America)

Year	Chart	Peak position
1976	Country Albums	6

Singles – Billboard (North America)

Year	Single	Chart	Peak position
1975	"When the Tingle Becomes a Chill"	Country Singles	2
1976	"Red, White and Blue"	Country Singles	20
