= Still Country =

Studio album by Loretta Lynn
- Released: September 12, 2000
- Recorded: 2000
- Studio: Scruggs Sound (Berry Hill, Tennessee)
- Genre: Country
- Length: 33:35
- Label: Audium Records, Koch Records
- Producer: Randy Scruggs

Loretta Lynn chronology
All Time Gospel Favorites (1997)	Still Country (2000)	All Time Greatest Hits (2002)

Singles from Still Country
- 1. "Country in My Genes" Released: June 16, 2000; 2. "I Can't Hear the Music" Released: March 5, 2001; 3. "Table for Two" Released: August 2001

Still Country is the forty-first solo studio album by American country music singer-songwriter Loretta Lynn, released on September 12, 2000, by Audium Records and Koch Records. It was Lynn's first commercial studio album in over a decade, since 1988's Who Was That Stranger.

The album was re-released in 2004 with a bonus DVD that features 2 music videos for "Country in My Genes".

== Track listing ==
No.	Title	Writer(s)	Length
1.	"On My Own Again"	Randy Scruggs	4:05
2.	"God's Country"	Loretta Lynn	2:36
3.	"Table for Two"	Max D. Barnes, Vince Gill	3:35
4.	"Working Girl"	Matraca Berg, Scruggs	3:34
5.	"I Can't Hear the Music"	Kendal Franceschi, Cody James, Lynn	3:40
6.	"Country in My Genes"	Larry Cordle, Betty Key, Larry Shell	3:09
7.	"Hold Her"	Irene Kelley, Don Wayne	3:23
8.	"Don't Open That Door"	Robin Lee Bruce, Coley McCabe, Jerry Salley	3:19
9.	"Somewhere Someone's Falling in Love"	Donnie Fritts, John Prine	3:01
10.	"The Blues Ain't Workin' on Me"	Tom Shapiro, George Teren	3:06
Total length:			33:35

2004 Bonus DVD
No.	Title	Length
1.	"Country in My Genes" (Version 1)	3:20
2.	"Country in My Genes" (Version 2)	3:30

== Personnel ==
- Matraca Berg - backing vocals
- Dan Dugmore - electric guitar, steel guitar
- Glen Duncan - fiddle, mandolin
- Stuart Duncan - fiddle
- Steve Gibson - electric guitar
- John Hobbs - mandolin, piano, synthesizer
- Carolyn Dawn Johnson - backing vocals
- Paul Leim - drums, percussion
- Loretta Lynn - lead vocals
- Lloyd Maines - steel guitar
- Liana Manis - backing vocals
- Ron "Snake" Reynolds - percussion
- Earl Scruggs - banjo
- Randy Scruggs - banjo, 12-string guitar, acoustic guitar
- Dennis Wilson - backing vocals
- Glenn Worf - acoustic bass guitar, bass guitar, upright bass
- Chris Young - backing vocals
- Curtis Young - backing vocals

== Chart performance ==
Chart (2000)	Peak position
US Top Country Albums (Billboard)	37
US Independent Albums (Billboard)	21
