= Red, White and Blue (song) =

Single by Loretta Lynn

from the album When the Tingle Becomes a Chill
- B-side: "Sounds of a New Love (Being Born)"
- Released: March 1976
- Recorded: January 30, 1975
- Studio: Bradley's Barn, Mt. Juliet, Tennessee
- Genre: Country
- Length: 2:14
- Label: MCA
- Songwriter(s): Loretta Lynn
- Producer(s): Owen Bradley

Loretta Lynn singles chronology
"When the Tingle Becomes a Chill" (1975)	"Red, White and Blue" (1976)	"Somebody Somewhere (Don't Know What He's Missin' Tonight)" (1976)

"Red, White and Blue" is a song written and originally performed by American country music artist Loretta Lynn. It was released as a single in March 1976 via MCA Records.

== Background and reception ==
"Red, White and Blue" was recorded at Bradley's Barn studio in Mount Juliet, Tennessee on January 30, 1975. The recording session was produced by the studio's owner, renowned country music producer Owen Bradley. Two additional tracks were recorded during this session.

"Red, White and Blue" reached number twenty on the Billboard Hot Country Singles survey in 1975. Additionally, the song peaked at number twenty six on the Canadian RPM Country Songs chart during this same period. It was included on her studio album, When the Tingle Becomes a Chill (1976).

== Track listings ==
7" vinyl single

- "Red, White and Blue" – 2:14
- "Sounds of a New Love (Being Born)" – 2:37

== Charts ==
=== Weekly charts ===
Chart (1976)	Peak position
Canada Country Songs (RPM)	26
US Hot Country Singles (Billboard)	20
