= Country Partners =

Studio album by Conway Twitty and Loretta Lynn
- Released: June 10, 1974
- Recorded: March 7, 1973–April 23, 1974
- Studios: Bradley's Barn, Mount Juliet, Tennessee
- Genre: Country
- Length: 29:34
- Label: MCA
- Producer: Owen Bradley

Conway Twitty and Loretta Lynn chronology
Louisiana Woman, Mississippi Man (1973)	Country Partners (1974)	Feelins' (1975)

Conway Twitty chronology
Honky Tonk Angel (1974)	Country Partners (1974)	I'm Not Through Loving You Yet (1974)

Loretta Lynn chronology
Loretta Lynn's Greatest Hits Vol. II (1974)	Country Partners (1974)	They Don't Make 'Em Like My Daddy (1974)

Singles from Country Partners
- 1. "As Soon as I Hang Up the Phone" Released: May 27, 1974

Country Partners is the fourth collaborative studio album by Conway Twitty and Loretta Lynn. It was released on June 10, 1974, by MCA Records.

== Critical reception ==
Professional ratings
Review scores
Source	Rating
AllMusic	3/5 stars

The Billboard review published in the June 22, 1974 issue said, "Tremendous singing partners they are, and joined once more in a collection which will surprise many of their closest fans. A couple of the tunes border on pop, and it's a great change of pace for them. But there's plenty of country and, as usual, excellent material." The review noted "I'm Getting Tired of Losing You", "Sweet Things Remember About You", and the fast-paced "It All Falls Down" as the best cuts on the album. A note to album dealers said, "The cover alone should help make this saleable."

Cashbox published a review in the June 22, 1974 issue saying, "Loretta Lynn and Conway Twitty stand as two of the leading singers on the country scene. Both tremendously talented in their own careers, when they make an LP together, you can be sure that it is going to be very special. The LP kicks off with their latest chart novelty single entitled "As Soon as I Hang Up the Phone". "Don't Mess Up a Good Thing" is an up-tempo tune that blends these two superb voices together and augments the track with some excellent instrumentation. "Two Lonely People" is a moving ballad that will at once capture your heart. Also included in this fine LP are "Spiders and Snakes", "Country Bumpkin", and "It All Falls Down"."

== Commercial performance ==
The album peaked at No. 1 on the US Billboard Hot Country LP's chart, the duo's second album to top the chart.

The album's only single, "As Soon as I Hang Up the Phone", was released in May 1974 and peaked at No. 1 on the US Billboard Hot Country Singles chart, their fourth consecutive No. 1 single together. In Canada, the single peaked at No. 1 on the RPM Country Singles chart, the duo's third consecutive song to top the chart. The single peaked at No. 57 on the Kent Music Report in Australia.

== Recording ==
Recording sessions for the album took place on April 23, 24 and 25, 1974, at Bradley's Barn in Mount Juliet, Tennessee. Two songs on the album were recorded during the sessions for 1973's Louisiana Woman, Mississippi Man. "As Soon as I Hang Up the Phone" was recorded on March 7, 1973, and "Lifetime Before" was recorded on April 5.

== Track listing ==
Side one
No.	Title	Writer(s)	Recording date	Length
1.	"As Soon as I Hang Up the Phone"	Conway Twitty	March 7, 1973	2:31
2.	"Don't Mess Up a Good Thing"	Oliver Sain	April 24, 1974	2:48
3.	"Love's Not Where Love Should Be"	Tracey Lee	April 25, 1974	2:40
4.	"Two Lonely People"	L.E. White	April 24, 1974	2:44
5.	"I Changed My Way"	Twitty	April 25, 1974	3:05
6.	"Country Bumpkin'"	Don Wayne	April 24, 1974	3:34

Side two
No.	Title	Writer(s)	Recording date	Length
1.	"Spiders & Snakes"	Jim Stafford; David Bellamy	April 25, 1974	2:55
2.	"I'm Gettin' Tired of Losing You"	Twitty	April 25, 1974	2:47
3.	"Sweet Things I Remember About You"	Darlene Shofner	April 23, 1974	2:18
4.	"It All Falls Down"	Kenny Starr	April 24, 1974	2:11
5.	"Lifetime Before"	William C. Hall; Bill Hayes	April 5, 1973	2:01

== Personnel ==
Adapted from the album liner notes and MCA recording session records.

- Harold Bradley – bass guitar
- Owen Bradley – producer
- Ray Edenton – acoustic guitar
- Bud Gray – photography
- John Hughey – steel guitar
- Loretta Lynn – lead vocals
- Tommy Markham – drums
- Grady Martin – guitar
- The Nashville Sounds – background vocals
- Bob Moore – bass
- Hargus Robbins – piano
- Conway Twitty – lead vocals

== Charts ==
Album

Chart (1974)	Peak position
US Hot Country LP's (Billboard)	1

Singles

Title	Year	Peak position		
Title	Year	US Country	CAN Country	AU
"As Soon as I Hang Up the Phone"	1974	1	1	57
