= All Time Gospel Favorites =

Studio album by Loretta Lynn
- Released: August 1997
- Recorded: 1996–1997
- Studio: Reflections Studio, Nashville, TN
- Genre: Country, gospel
- Length: 70:45
- Label: Heartland Music
- Producer: Jerry Kennedy

Loretta Lynn chronology
Making More Memories (1994)	All Time Gospel Favorites (1997)	Still Country (2000)

Alternate cover
- Cover art for 2004 and 2012 Time Life editions.

All Time Gospel Favorites is the fortieth solo studio album by American country music singer-songwriter Loretta Lynn. It was released in August 1997, by Heartland Music. It was only sold for a limited time. It was re-released on May 25, 2004, by Time Life Records, in an abbreviated 20 track edition with new cover art. Time Life Records would release a 10 track edition on April 24, 2012, with the same cover art as the 2004 edition.

All Time Gospel Favorites was the first album Lynn recorded following the death of her husband, Oliver Lynn, in August 1996. It is an album of gospel songs. Some are new versions of songs Lynn had previously recorded on her three gospel albums, Hymns (1965), Who Says God Is Dead! (1968), and God Bless America Again (1972). Some are new songs that Lynn had not previously recorded.

== Track listing ==
Original release Disc one
No.	Title	Writer(s)	Length
1.	"How Great Thou Art"	Stuart K. Hine	3:06
2.	"Precious Memories"	J.B.F. Wright	3:33
3.	"In the Sweet By and By"	Samuel Fillmore Bennett, J.P. Webster	2:36
4.	"Amazing Grace"	John Newton	2:36
5.	"When the Roll Is Called Up Yonder"	James Milton Black	2:44
6.	"What a Friend We Have in Jesus"	Charles C. Converse, Joseph Medlicott Scriven	3:53
7.	"Wings of a Dove"	Robert B. Ferguson	2:12
8.	"Are You Washed in the Blood?"	Elisha A. Hoffman	1:56
9.	"Just a Closer Walk with Thee"	Traditional	2:59
10.	"Swing Low, Sweet Chariot"	Unknown	2:27
11.	"(There'll Be) Peace in the Valley (For Me)"	Thomas A. Dorsey	3:06
12.	"I Feel Like Traveling On"	P.D.	2:35
13.	"Old Rugged Cross"	George Bernard	2:54
Total length:			36:37

Disc two
No.	Title	Writer(s)	Length
1.	"Will the Circle Be Unbroken?"	Charles H. Gabriel	2:06
2.	"In the Garden"	C. Austin Miles	2:30
3.	"I'd Rather Have Jesus"	George Shea, Rhea Miller	2:37
4.	"I'll Fly Away"	Albert E. Brumley Sr.	1:54
5.	"Softly and Tenderly"	Will Lamartine Thompson	3:39
6.	"A Message from Jesus" (feat. Ernest Ray Lynn)	Ernest Ray Lynn	3:58
7.	"Unclouded Day"	J.K. Alwood	2:10
8.	"Old Time Religion"	Traditional	1:50
9.	"Put Your Hand in the Hand"	Gene MacLellan	2:44
10.	"If I Could Her My Mother Pray Again"	Traditional	2:15
11.	"The Church in the Wildwood"	William Savage Pitts	2:57
12.	"I Believe"	Ervin Drake, Irvin Graham, Jimmy Shirl, Al Stillman	2:34
13.	"When They Ring Those Golden Bells"	Dion DeMarbelle	2:54
Total length:			34:08

2004 Time Life edition
No.	Title	Writer(s)	Length
1.	"How Great Thou Art"	Stuart K. Hine	3:06
2.	"Precious Memories"	J.B.F. Wright	3:33
3.	"In the Sweet By and By"	Samuel Fillmore Bennett, J.P. Webster	2:36
4.	"Amazing Grace"	John Newton	2:36
5.	"When the Roll Is Called Up Yonder"	James Milton Black	2:44
6.	"What a Friend We Have in Jesus"	Charles C. Converse, Joseph Medlicott Scriven	3:53
7.	"Wings of a Dove"	Robert B. Ferguson	2:12
8.	"Just a Closer Walk with Thee"	Traditional	2:59
9.	"Swing Low, Sweet Chariot"	Unknown	2:27
10.	"(There'll Be) Peace in the Valley (For Me)"	Thomas A. Dorsey	3:06
11.	"I Feel Like Traveling On"	P.D.	2:35
12.	"Old Rugged Cross"	George Bernard	2:54
13.	"Will the Circle Be Unbroken?"	Charles H. Gabriel	2:06
14.	"In the Garden"	C. Austin Miles	2:30
15.	"I'd Rather Have Jesus"	George Shea, Rhea Miller	2:37
16.	"I'll Fly Away"	Albert E. Brumley Sr.	1:54
17.	"Softly and Tenderly"	Will Lamartine Thompson	3:39
18.	"Unclouded Day"	J.K. Alwood	2:10
19.	"Old Time Religion"	Traditional	1:50
20.	"If I Could Hear My Mother Pray Again"	Traditional	2:15
Total length:			53:42

2012 Time Life edition
No.	Title	Writer(s)	Length
1.	"When the Roll Is Called Up Yonder"	James Milton Black	2:44
2.	"Just a Closer Walk with Thee"	Traditional	2:59
3.	"Amazing Grace"	John Newton	2:36
4.	"I Feel Like Traveling On"	P.D.	2:35
5.	"Swing Low, Sweet Chariot"	Unknown	2:27
6.	"Old Rugged Cross"	George Bernard	2:54
7.	"If I Could Hear My Mother Pray Again"	Traditional	2:15
8.	"What a Friend We Have in Jesus"	Charles C. Converse, Joseph Medlicott Scriven	3:53
9.	"Old Time Religion"	Traditional	1:50
10.	"In the Garden"	C. Austin Miles	2:30
Total length:			26:43

== Personnel ==
Adapted from the album liner notes.

- Ira Pittelman - Executive Producer
- Jerry Kennedy for JK Productions, Inc. - Producer
- Ronny Light - Engineer
- Bergen White - String arrangements

Musicians:

- Jimmy Capps, Pat Flynn, Jerry Kennedy, Pete Wade - guitar
- Sonny Garrish - steel guitar
- Mike Leech - bass
- Gene Chrisman - drums
- Hargus "Pig" Robbins - keyboards
- Charlie McCoy - harmonica
- Jerry Kennedy - Dobro
- Carl Gorodetzky, Pamela Sixfin, Lee Larrison, Alan Umstead, Conni Ellisor, Gary Vanosdale, James Grosjean, Kristin Wilkinson, Robert Mason - strings
- Glen Duncan - fiddle, mandolin
- The Jordanaires (Gordon Stoker, Neal Matthews, Duane West, Ray Walker), Millie Kirkham, Bergen White, Cindy Walker, Bob Bailey, Vicki Hampton - backing vocals
