= On the Road with Loretta and the Coal Miners =

Studio album by The Coal Miners
- Released: 1976
- Recorded: circa 1975
- Genre: Country
- Label: Loretta Lynn, Inc.

Loretta Lynn chronology
Home (1975)	On the Road with Loretta and the Coal Miners (1976)	When the Tingle Becomes a Chill (1976)

On the Road with Loretta and the Coal Miners is a studio album by American country singer-songwriter Loretta Lynn's touring band, the Coal Miners. The album was released in 1976 via Loretta Lynn Enterprises, Inc. The album was sold at Lynn's own concert performances as well as exclusive music stores. A total of eleven tracks were included on the album.

== Background, content and release ==
By the mid-1970s, Loretta Lynn had become a successful recording artist and concert attraction. Between 1966 and 1970, she acquired 13 top ten hits on the Billboard country chart and released many albums. After many years under the supervision of The Wilburn Brothers, she began touring independently with her own band that she named The Coal Miners. On the Road with Loretta and the Coal Miners is the first album release by her touring band. The album was recorded circa 1975

A total of 11 tracks are featured on the album. Seven of the album's tracks featured lead accompaniment from the Coal Miners, while two tracks feature Lynn's son (Ernest Ray Lynn) on lead vocals. Lynn's solo contributions on the record include "Love Is the Foundation" and her cover of Doris Day's "Secret Love."

On the Road with Loretta and the Coal Miners was released in 1976 on the label, Loretta Lynn Enterprises, Inc. The label was not only a record company but was also responsible for other copyrighted works by Lynn. According to the liner notes, the company had an office located in Nashville, Tennessee. The album's liner notes were written by Oliver "Doolittle" Lynn, who was Lynn's husband and president of Loretta Lynn Enterprises. The album was issued as a vinyl LP, containing five songs on side one and six songs on side two. The album did not reach any peak positions on national publication charts, notably Billboard. It also did not spawn any singles to radio.

== Track listing ==
Side one
No.	Title	Writer(s)	Length
1.	"Love Is the Foundation"	William Cody Hall	2:26
2.	"Pickin' Shovel"	Bob Kemper	2:17
3.	"Movin' On"	Merle Haggard	2:26
4.	"Blue Eyes Crying in the Rain"	Fred Rose	2:19
5.	"Bloody Mary Morning"	Willie Nelson	2:25

Side two
No.	Title	Writer(s)	Length
1.	"Secret Love"	Sammy Fain; Paul Francis Webster	3:10
2.	"Six Days on the Road"	Earl Green, Carl Montgomery	2:22
3.	"For a Minute There"	Jerry Foster; Bill Rice	2:31
4.	"Trixie Delaney"	Buddy Cannon; Gene Dunlap	2:48
5.	"Will You Be There"	Dunlap; Lee Miller	2:47
6.	"It's Dynomite"	Jay Marshall; Don Wayne	1:44

== Personnel ==
All credits are adapted from the liner notes. All personnel below were part of Lynn's touring band, the Coal Miners.

Musical and technical personnel

- Don Ballinger – rhythm guitar
- Gene Dunlap – piano
- Chuck Flynn – bass
- Bob Hempker – steel guitar
- Ernest Lynn – lead vocals
- Loretta Lynn – lead vocals
- Oliver Lynn – liner notes
- Ken Riley – drums
- Dave Thornhill – bandleader, guitar

== Release history ==
Region	Date	Format	Label	Ref.
United States	1976	Vinyl	Loretta Lynn Enterprises, Inc.	
