= Uncloudy Day =

Song by The Staple Singers
- Released: 1956
- Recorded: 11 September 1956
- Studio: Universal Recording Corp (Chicago)
- Genre: Gospel music
- Length: 3:00
- Label: Vee-Jay Records
- Songwriter: J.K. Alwood

Uncloudy Day, also known as Unclouded Day, is a gospel song. Originally popular in church hymnals, it has come to be recorded many times over the years since, including being an early attention-getter for future star act the Staple Singers. In 1956, their version served as an inspiration to Bob Dylan, who called it "the most mysterious thing I'd ever heard".

== Song history ==
Alwood related a story about the event that inspired the song:

It was a balmy night in August 1879, when returning from a debate in Spring Hill, Ohio, to my home in Morenci, Michigan, about 1:00 a.m. I saw a beautiful rainbow north by northwest against a dense black nimbus cloud. The sky was all perfectly clear except this dark cloud which covered about forty degrees of the horizon and extended about halfway to the zenith. The phenomenon was entirely new to me and my nerves refreshed by the balmy air and the lovely sight. Old Morpheus was playing his sweetest lullaby. Another mile of travel, a few moments of time, a fellow of my size was ensconced in sweet home and wrapped in sweet sleep. A first class know-nothing till rosy-sweet morning was wide over the fields.

To awake and look abroad and remember the night was to be filled with sweet melody. A while at the organ brought forth a piece of music now known as "The Unclouded Day." A Day and a half was bestowed on the four stanzas.

— A Rainbow at Midnight and A Song With Morning (1896)

The Staple Singers covered this song in 1956, 16-year-old Mavis Staples providing deep-voiced, soulful vocals that most assumed had come from an older woman expressing great experience, or even a man. It was also covered by the outlaw country singer Willie Nelson in 1977, featured on his album The Troublemaker, and performed by both Nelson and Vermont rock band Phish at Farm Aid in 1998.

Among other artists to have recorded this song are Gloria Lynne (1954), Johnny Cash (1970), B. J. Thomas, Willie Nelson (1976), Rory Block (1981), Myrna Summers (1981), Don Henley (1982), Doc Watson (1990), Sons of the San Joaquin (1997), Randy Travis (2003), Brad Paisley (2005), Brenda Lee (2007), The Blind Boys of Alabama (2008) and Audra Mae (2011).

== Lyrics ==
O they tell me of a home far beyond the skies,
O they tell me of a home far away;
O they tell me of a home where no storm clouds rise,
O they tell me of an unclouded day.

[Refrain]

O the land of cloudless day,
O the land of an unclouded sky,
O they tell me of a home where no storm clouds rise,
O they tell me of an unclouded day.

O they tell me of a home where my friends have gone,
O they tell me of that land far away,
Where the tree of life in eternal bloom
Sheds its fragrance through the unclouded day.

[Refrain]

O they tell me of a King in His beauty there,
And they tell me that mine eyes shall behold
Where He sits on the throne that is whiter than snow,
In the city that is made of gold.

[Refrain]

O they tell me that He smiles on His children there,
And His smile drives their sorrows all away;
And they tell me that no tears ever come again
In that lovely land of unclouded day.
