= As Soon as I Hang Up the Phone =

Single by Conway Twitty and Loretta Lynn

from the album Country Partners
- B-side: "A Lifetime Before"
- Released: July 1974
- Genre: Country
- Label: MCA
- Songwriter(s): Conway Twitty
- Producer(s): Owen Bradley

Conway Twitty and Loretta Lynn singles chronology
"Louisiana Woman, Mississippi Man" (1973)	"As Soon as I Hang Up the Phone" (1974)	"Feelins'" (1975)

"As Soon as I Hang Up the Phone" is a song written by American country music artist Conway Twitty, and recorded by Twitty and Loretta Lynn as a duet. It was released in July 1974 as the first single from the album Country Partners. It was the fourth number one on the U.S. country singles chart for the pair as a duo. The single went to number one for a single week and spent 11 weeks on the chart. It also reached number 1 in South Africa, spending 16 weeks on the chart.

== Content ==
The song - depicting a woman trying to maintain a crumbling relationship, but who soon realises is ending - is a rare spoken word/sung duet. Lynn provides the sung vocals while Twitty performs the spoken part. The song was actually recorded with Twitty in another room on the telephone to Lynn in the recording booth.

== Chart performance ==
Chart (1974)	Peak position
U.S. Billboard Hot Country Singles	1
Canadian RPM Country Tracks	1
South Africa (Springbok SA Top 20)	1
