= Spring Fever (song) =

Single by Loretta Lynn

from the album Out of My Head and Back in My Bed
- B-side: "God Bless the Children"
- Released: May 1978
- Recorded: December 1, 1976
- Studio: Bradley's Barn, Mt. Juliet, Tennessee
- Genre: Country
- Length: 2:40
- Label: MCA
- Songwriter(s): Lola Jean Dillon
- Producer(s): Owen Bradley

Loretta Lynn singles chronology
"Out of My Head and Back in My Bed" (1977)	"Spring Fever" (1978)	"We've Come a Long Way Baby" (1978)

"Spring Fever" is a song written by Lola Jean Dillon that was originally performed by American country music artist Loretta Lynn. It was released as a single in May 1978 via MCA Records.

== Background and reception ==
"Spring Fever" was recorded at Bradley's Barn studio in Mount Juliet, Tennessee on December 1, 1978. The recording session was produced by the studio's owner, renowned country music producer Owen Bradley. Two additional tracks were recorded during this session.

"Spring Fever" reached number twelve on the Billboard Hot Country Singles survey in 1978. Additionally, the song peaked at number ten on the Canadian RPM Country Songs chart during this same period. It was included on her studio album, Out of My Head and Back in My Bed (1978).

== Track listings ==
7" vinyl single

- "Spring Fever" – 2:40
- "God Bless the Children" – 2:28

== Charts ==
Chart (1978)	Peak position
Canada Country Songs (RPM)	10
US Hot Country Singles (Billboard)	12
