= WSM =

WSM may refer to:

- 102.7 WSM, former name of DWSM (now Star FM)
- WSM, international airport code for Wisman Aviation
- WSM (AM), a radio station (650 AM) licensed to Nashville, Tennessee, United States
- WSM-FM, a radio station (95.5 FM) licensed to Nashville, Tennessee, United States
- WSMV-TV, Nashville, Tennessee, US television station, former callsign WSM-TV
- Warner Strategic Marketing, part of the Warner Music Group
- Web-based System Manager, IBM management software
- Weekly Shōnen Magazine, a Japanese manga magazine
- Weighted sum model, for decision analysis
- Weston-super-Mare railway station, England, station code
- Winchester Short Magnum, a family of rifle cartridges
- Workers Solidarity Movement, Ireland
- World Socialist Movement
- World's Strongest Man competition
- Samoa ISO 3166-1 country code
- WSM Music Group Ltd., Hong Kong
- W. Somerset Maugham, English playwright
