= The Sound in Your Mind =

Studio album by Willie Nelson
- Released: February 1976
- Studio: Autumn Sound (Garland, Texas)
- Genre: Country; outlaw country; country rock; honky-tonk
- Length: 33:38
- Label: Columbia
- Producer: Willie Nelson

Willie Nelson chronology
Red Headed Stranger (1975)	The Sound in Your Mind (1976)	The Troublemaker (1976)

The Sound in Your Mind is the nineteenth studio album by American country music artist Willie Nelson. This was his second album for Columbia Records.

Professional ratings
Review scores
Source	Rating
Allmusic	link
Christgau's Record Guide	B−

== Track listing ==
All songs written by Willie Nelson, except where noted.

=== Side one ===
1. "That Lucky Old Sun (Just Rolls Around Heaven All Day)" (Haven Gillespie, Beasley Smith) – 2:20
2. "If You've Got the Money (I've Got the Time)" (Lefty Frizzell, Jim Beck) – 2:05
3. "A Penny for Your Thoughts" (Jenny Lou Carson) – 3:22
4. "The Healing Hands of Time" – 3:58
5. "Thanks Again" – 2:14
6. "I'd Have to be Crazy" (Steven Fromholz) – 4:21

=== Side two ===
1. "Amazing Grace" (Traditional, arr. Nelson) – 5:41
2. "The Sound in Your Mind" – 3:27
3. "Medley" – 8:31
  - "Funny How Time Slips Away"
  - "Crazy"
  - "Night Life" (Paul Buskirk, Walt Breeland, Nelson)

== Personnel ==
- Willie Nelson – vocals, guitar, arrangements, production
- Bobbie Nelson – piano
- Paul English – drums
- Rex Ludwick – drums
- Jody Payne – guitar
- Bee Spears – bass guitar
- Mickey Raphael – harmonica
- Steve Fromholz – harmony vocals on "I'd Have to Be Crazy"
- Tom Morrell – pedal steel guitar on "That Lucky Old Sun"
- Phil York – engineer

== Charts ==
=== Weekly charts ===
Chart (1976)	Peak position
US Billboard 200	48
US Top Country Albums (Billboard)	1

=== Year-end charts ===
Chart (1976)	Position
US Top Country Albums (Billboard)	1
