= The Letter (Conway Twitty and Loretta Lynn song) =

Single by Conway Twitty and Loretta Lynn

from the album United Talent
- B-side: "God Bless America Again"
- Released: June 1, 1976
- Genre: Country
- Label: MCA
- Songwriters: Charles Haney; Conway Twitty
- Producer: Owen Bradley

Conway Twitty and Loretta Lynn singles chronology
"Feelins'" (1975)	"The Letter" (1976)	"I Can't Love You Enough" (1977)

"The Letter" is a song recorded by American country music artists Conway Twitty and Loretta Lynn as a duet. It was released in June 1976 as the first single from their album United Talent. The song peaked at number 3 on the Billboard Hot Country Singles chart. It also reached number 1 on the RPM Country Tracks chart in Canada. It was written by Twitty and Charles Haney.

The song – spoken wall-to-wall, with Twitty and Lynn trading spoken parts and set to a ballad-type musical background – is about a young man who is unfaithful to his girlfriend, resulting in the end of the relationship. Some time later, the two meet up again and she asks him to make good on a promise they made that if one ever needed to help the other, they would. She asks him to write a letter that affirms love and faithfulness, regret and willingness to repent under the guise that it would be seen by her current boyfriend (who, like the male protagonist was unfaithful) and that he would realize his mistake and that he had a good thing. The letter turns out to be ironic: It is a type of a Dear John letter, and it is the letter writer who, in writing the letter, admits his own mistakes and expresses his willingness to change.

== "B" Side: "God Bless America Again" ==
The B-side, "God Bless America Again," did not chart as a flip side or on its own, but still received significant airplay due to its release close to the United States Bicentennial. Twitty recites the spoken word part while Lynn signs the refrain, with Twitty joining on the final refrain. This song still receives airplay today on classic country radio stations.

== Chart performance ==
Chart (1976)	Peak position
U.S. Billboard Hot Country Singles	3
Canadian RPM Country Tracks	1
