= El Paso City =

Single by Marty Robbins

from the album El Paso City
- B-side: "When I'm Gone"
- Released: March 19, 1976
- Genre: Country
- Length: 4:20
- Label: Columbia
- Songwriter(s): Marty Robbins
- Producer(s): Billy Sherrill

Marty Robbins singles chronology
"Shotgun Rider" (1975)	"El Paso City" (1976)	"Among My Souvenirs" (1976)

"El Paso City" is a song written and recorded by American country music artist Marty Robbins. It was released in March 1976 as the first single and title track from the album El Paso City. The song was Robbins' 15th number one on the U.S. country singles chart and his first since "My Woman, My Woman, My Wife" six years earlier. The single stayed at number one for two weeks and spent 11 weeks on the chart.

== Background ==
Robbins wrote "El Paso City" while flying over El Paso, Texas, in - he reported - the same amount of time it takes to sing, four minutes and 14 seconds. It was only the second time that ever happened to him; the first time was when he composed the original El Paso as fast as he could write it down.

The song is a reworking (and indirect sequel) of Robbins' 1959 hit "El Paso," about a gunfighter who flees for his life after killing another man in a fit of jealousy, but who later returns and is himself shot dead by a posse.

== Content ==
The song, unlike the time period of "El Paso," was set in the present day; and the singer is a passenger on an airplane over El Paso and is compelled to recall the song he heard long ago ("El Paso"). He fails to recall the man who sang "El Paso," but immediately senses a supernatural connection to the story. He wonders to himself, "Could it be that I could be the cowboy in this mystery," suggesting a past life.

The arrangement of "El Paso City" includes riffs and themes from "El Paso" and its sequel, "Feleena (From El Paso)".

== Charts ==
=== Weekly charts ===
Chart (1976)	Peak position
US Hot Country Songs (Billboard)	1
Canadian RPM Country Tracks	1

=== Year-end charts ===
Chart (1976)	Position
US Hot Country Songs (Billboard)	6

== Other versions ==
The Meat Puppets covered the song on their single We Don't Exist (1994). A live version (along with covers of two other Marty Robbins songs, "Big Iron" and "A White Sport Coat"), was also featured on their 2023 album Camp Songs.
