= The Troublemaker (album) =

Studio album by Willie Nelson
- Released: September 1976
- Recorded: February 1973
- Studio: Atlantic (New York City)
- Genre: Country gospel
- Length: 44:24 (Original); 61:05 (2004 reissue)
- Label: Columbia
- Producer: Arif Mardin

Willie Nelson chronology
The Sound in Your Mind (1976)	The Troublemaker (1976)	To Lefty from Willie (1977)

The Troublemaker is the 20th studio album by country singer and songwriter Willie Nelson. When Nelson refused to sign an early extension of his contract with RCA in 1972, the label decided not to release any further recordings. Nelson hired Neil Reshen as his manager after friend Waylon Jennings hired him as his from the suggestion of Richie Albright. While Reshen negotiated with RCA, Nelson moved to Austin, Texas, where the ongoing hippie music scene at the Armadillo World Headquarters renewed his musical style. In Nashville, Nelson met producer Jerry Wexler, vice president of Atlantic Records, who was interested in his music. Reshen solved the problems with RCA and signed Nelson with Atlantic Records as their first country music artist.

Produced by Arif Mardin, the album was recorded in two days at the Atlantic Records studio in New York City in February 1973. Nelson and his usual backup musicians were joined by Doug Sahm and his band. The release of the album was cancelled by Atlantic Records, which decided that the album was not right for the label. After Atlantic closed its experimental country music division, Nelson signed a contract with Columbia Records that gave him total creative control. After the critical and commercial success of Red Headed Stranger, the label published The Troublemaker in 1976. Its release had a good reception by the critics, while it charted on Billboard's Top Country Albums and on the Billboard 200, at number one and sixty respectively. The single "Uncloudy Day" charted at number four on Billboard's Hot Country Singles.

== Background and recording ==
In April 1972, after Nelson recorded "Mountain Dew", his final RCA single, the label requested that he renew his contract ahead of schedule, with the implication that RCA would not release any further recordings if he did not sign. Neil Reshen, who Nelson hired as his manager to negotiate with the label, got RCA to agree to end the contract upon repayment of US$1,400 that Nelson had been overpaid. At the same time, Nelson had moved to Austin, Texas, to take a short break. Austin's burgeoning hippie music scene at venues like Armadillo World Headquarters rejuvenated the singer. His popularity in Austin soared as he played his own brand of music that was a blend of country, folk, and jazz influences.

During a trip to Nashville, Tennessee, Nelson attended a party in Harlan Howard's house, where he sang the songs that he had written for the album Phases and Stages. Another guest was Atlantic Records' vice-president Jerry Wexler, who previously had produced works for artists such as Ray Charles and Aretha Franklin. Wexler was interested in Nelson's music, so when Atlantic opened a country music division of their label, he offered Nelson a contract that gave him more creative control than his deal with RCA. When Nelson was released from his RCA contract, he signed with Atlantic for US$25,000 per year, becoming the label's first country artist.

"Uncloudy Day"
Along the album, Nelson uses the typical sound style of his band, while performing Gospel music

The recording sessions took place in February 1973, Wexler provided Nelson and his band with a studio in New York City, where the recordings were produced by Arif Mardin. Nelson began with The Troublemaker, a repertoire of classic gospel songs, recorded in a honky-tonk style. Nelson called in his sister Bobbie to play the piano, while Doug Sahm and his band also were part of the sessions. The recording consumed two days, and after finishing the songs for The Troublemaker, Nelson recorded the album Shotgun Willie during the same sessions.

== Release and reception ==
The release of the album was cancelled when Atlantic Records felt that the album was not right for the label, which later closed its experimental country music division. It was later released by Columbia Records in 1976. Nelson signed a contract with the label that gave him total creative control, and the release was well leveraged by the critical and sales success of his 1975 album Red Headed Stranger. Upon its release, the album peaked at number one on Billboard's Top Country Albums and at number sixty on the Billboard 200. Meanwhile, the single "Uncloudy Day" peaked at number four on Billboard's Hot Country Singles.

Professional ratings
Review scores
Source	Rating
AllMusic	4.5/5 stars
Rolling Stone	4/5 stars

Billboard delivered a favorable review, describing the album as a "powerful LP, that is often lively and uptempo". Stereo Review felt that Nelson "hit it right on the button with his honky-tonk instrumentation".

Rolling Stone favored the album, attributing its success to its link with the Outlaw movement. Stephen Thomas Erlewine praised the interpretation of the gospel standards with a musicalization similar to Nelson's previous releases, and the selection of the songs that according to the reviewer gave the album a "unique, fresh feel".

== Track listing ==
All arrangements by Willie Nelson.

Side one
No.	Title	Writer(s)	Length
1.	"Uncloudy Day"	J. K. Alwood	4:40
2.	"When the Roll Is Called Up Yonder"	James Milton Black	2:43
3.	"Whispering Hope"	Septimus Winner	5:35
4.	"There Is a Fountain"	William Cowper	3:13
5.	"Will the Circle Be Unbroken"	Ada R. Habershon, Charles H. Gabriel	4:35
6.	"The Troublemaker"	Bruce Belland, Dave Somerville	1:52

Side two
No.	Title	Writer(s)	Length
1.	"In the Garden"	C. Austin Miles	4:08
2.	"Where the Soul Never Dies"	William M. Golden	4:14
3.	"Sweet Bye & Bye"	Fillmore Bennett, Joseph Webster	2:39
4.	"Shall We Gather"	Robert Lowry	3:07
5.	"Precious Memories"	J. B. F Wright	7:36

== Personnel ==
The recording session featured:

- Willie Nelson - guitar, vocals, arranger
- Jimmy Day - pedal steel guitar, Dobro
- Paul English - drums
- Larry Gatlin - guitar, vocals
- Jeff Gutcheon - organ
- Dee Moeller - vocals
- Bobbie Nelson - piano
- Doug Sahm - fiddle, vocals
- Sammi Smith - vocals
- Dan Spears - double bass

== Charts ==
=== Weekly charts ===
Chart (1976)	Peak position
US Billboard 200	60
US Top Country Albums (Billboard)	1

=== Year-end charts ===
Chart (1977)	Position
US Top Country Albums (Billboard)	13

=== Singles ===
Song	Chart	Peak
"Uncloudy Day"	Billboard's Hot Country Singles	4
