= Feelins' (album) =

Studio album by Conway Twitty and Loretta Lynn
- Released: June 9, 1975
- Recorded: April 1–24, 1975
- Studio: Bradley's Barn, Mount Juliet, Tennessee
- Genre: Country
- Length: 25:48
- Label: MCA
- Producer: Owen Bradley

Conway Twitty and Loretta Lynn chronology
Country Partners (1974)	Feelins' (1975)	United Talent (1976)

Conway Twitty chronology
Linda on My Mind (1975)	Feelins' (1975)	The High Priest of Country Music (1975)

Loretta Lynn chronology
Back to the Country (1975)	Feelins' (1975)	Home (1975)

Singles from Feelins' (sic)
- 1. "Feelins'" Released: June 2, 1975

Feelins' is the fifth collaborative studio album by Conway Twitty and Loretta Lynn. It was released on June 9, 1975, by MCA Records.

== Critical reception ==
Professional ratings
Review scores
Source	Rating
AllMusic	2.5/5 stars

Billboard published a review in the June 21, 1975 issue that said, "Put them together and what do you have? A flock of hits, that's what. Loretta gets a little farther away from the traditional every time she sings, and Conway just keeps getting better and better. Together they are unbeatable. Great collection of songs, fine arrangements, that Owen Bradley touch in production, and another great album." The review noted "I'll Never Get Tired (Of Saying I Love You)", "Little Boy Love", "You Done Lost Your Baby", and "Some Kind of a Woman" as the best cuts on the album with a not to album dealers saying, "It's the hottest pair going."

The June 28, 1975 issue of Cashbox carried a review of the album which said, "Leading with their current hot single of the same title, the dynamic duo of Conway and Loretta entertain us with 10 more great songs. Vocals blend beautifully, as to be expected, guaranteeing them many more years of being the top country duo. Favorite cuts include "Dyn-o-mite", "I’ll Never Get Tired (Of Saying I Love You)", "You Done Lost Your Woman", and "Store Up Love"."

== Commercial performance ==
The album peaked at No. 1 on the US Billboard Hot Country LPs chart, the duo's third consecutive album to top the chart.

The album's only single, "Feelins'", was released in June 1975 and peaked at No. 1 on the Billboard Hot Country Singles chart, the duo's fifth and final single to top the chart. In Canada, the single peaked at No. 2 on the RPM Country Singles chart.

== Recording ==
Recording sessions for the album took place at Bradley's Barn in Mount Juliet, Tennessee, on April 1, 2, 23 and 24, 1975.

== Track listing ==
Side one
No.	Title	Writer(s)	Recording date	Length
1.	"Feelins'"	Troy Seals; Don Goodman; Will Jennings	April 1, 1975	3:00
2.	"Dyn-o-mite"	Don Wayne; Jay Marshall	April 24, 1975	2:06
3.	"Back Home Again"	John Denver	April 23, 1975	3:53
4.	"I'll Never Get Tired (Of Saying I Love You)"	Kenny L. Starr	April 24, 1975	2:22
5.	"Little Boy Love"	Conway Twitty	April 24, 1975	2:18

Side two
No.	Title	Writer(s)	Recording date	Length
1.	"She's About a Mover"	Doug Sahm	April 2, 1975	2:51
2.	"Let Me Be There"	John Rostill	April 23, 1975	2:27
3.	"You Done Lost Your Baby"	Twitty	April 1, 1975	2:11
4.	"Store Up Love"	L. E. White	April 2, 1975	1:58
5.	"Some Kind of a Woman"	Jimmy Peppers; Tommy Cash	April 2, 1975	2:42

== Charts ==
Album

Chart (1975)	Peak position
US Hot Country LP's (Billboard)	1

Singles

Title	Year	Peak position	
Title	Year	US Country	CAN Country
"Feelins'"	1975	1	2
