= I Can't Love You Enough =

Single by Conway Twitty and Loretta Lynn

from the album Dynamic Duo
- B-side: "Bed I'm Dreaming On"
- Released: May 16, 1977
- Genre: Country
- Label: MCA
- Songwriters: Max D. Barnes; Troy Seals
- Producer: Owen Bradley

Conway Twitty and Loretta Lynn singles chronology
"The Letter" (1976)	"I Can't Love You Enough" (1977)	"From Seven Till Ten" (1978)

"I Can't Love You Enough" is a song written by Troy Seals and Max D. Barnes, and recorded by American country music artists Conway Twitty and Loretta Lynn as a duet. It was released in May 1977 as the first single from their album Dynamic Duo. The song peaked at number 2 on the Billboard Hot Country Singles chart. It also reached number 1 on the RPM Country Tracks chart in Canada. This song is also featured in the 1982 Kenny Rogers movie "Six Pack".

== Chart performance ==
Chart (1977)	Peak position
U.S. Billboard Hot Country Singles	2
Canadian RPM Country Tracks	1
