= The Pill (song) =

Single by Loretta Lynn

from the album Back to the Country
- B-side: "They Don't Make Em Like My Daddy"
- Released: 1975
- Recorded: 12 December 1972
- Studio: Bradley's Barn, Mount Juliet, Tennessee
- Genre: Country
- Label: MCA
- Songwriters: Lorene Allen, Don McHan, T. D. Bayless and Loretta Lynn
- Producer: Owen Bradley

Loretta Lynn singles chronology
"Shadrack, the Black Reindeer" (1975)	"The Pill" (1975)	"When the Tingle Becomes a Chill" (1975)

"The Pill" is a 1975 country music song recorded by Loretta Lynn. It is one of her best known songs as well as the most controversial record of her career. It is about the freedom a woman receives from birth control pills. The song briefly crossed over into mainstream success peaking at #70 on the Billboard Hot 100 becoming the highest-charting song on the pop chart in Lynn's solo career. The background vocals on the record are by the Jordanaires.

Despite having the same name and similar themes, it is not related to "The Pill", written by Scottish folk musician Matthew McGinn and performed in the United States by Pete Seeger.

== About the song ==
"The Pill", written by Lorene Allen, Don McHan, T. D. Bayless, and Loretta Lynn, is a comic-tinged song about birth control. The song tells a story of a wife who is upset about her husband getting her pregnant year after year, but is now happy because she can control her own reproductive choices because she has "the pill" (which had been introduced in 1960). The song, like many of Lynn's other hits, suggested her personal life: she'd had six children, four of whom were born before she was 20. (After a protracted legal battle over the publishing rights to her songs, it has become widely known that Lynn did, in fact, co-write this song.)

The song's frank discussion of birth control, something that was considered risqué subject matter at the time (especially in country music), led to a number of country radio stations refusing to play it. The song received much publicity and airplay on the stations that would air it, but its ban from a number of radio stations caused the record to stall at number five on the charts at a time when a Loretta Lynn record was almost guaranteed to be a top three hit, often a number one record. Nevertheless, it earned her more press and attention outside the country market than anything she had ever recorded before and ultimately became her highest-charting pop single, peaking at #70 on the Hot 100. The single did go #1 in Canada.

Recorded in 1972 and held back by her label, the song was finally released in 1975, Lynn's first single that year. The single was released on her 1975 album Back to the Country and was the only single released from the album.

== Influence of song ==
In an interview for Playgirl, Lynn recounted how she had been congratulated after the song's success by a number of rural physicians, telling her how "The Pill" had done more to highlight the availability of birth control in isolated, rural areas, than all the literature they had released. It was a rare liberal stand on Lynn's part, who otherwise was a socially conservative Christian and tended to avoid overt sociopolitical stances in her music when she could.

== Other recordings ==
Jill Johnson and Lisa Nilsson recorded the song on the 2017 album Jills veranda Nashville : livemusiken från säsong 3.

== Chart performance ==
Chart (1975)	Peak position
Australia (Kent Music Report)	87
U.S. Billboard Hot Country Singles	5
U.S. Billboard Hot 100	70
Canadian RPM Country Tracks	1
Canadian RPM Top Singles	49

Year-end Charts

Chart (1975)	Position
Canada Top 25 Country Singles of '75 (RPM)	7
