= Back to the Country =

Studio album by Loretta Lynn
- Released: February 3, 1975
- Recorded: December 12, 1972–December 19, 1974
- Studios: Bradley's Barn, Mount Juliet, Tennessee
- Genre: Country
- Length: 32:09
- Label: MCA
- Producer: Owen Bradley

Loretta Lynn chronology
They Don't Make 'Em Like My Daddy (1974)	Back to the Country (1975)	Feelins' (1975)

Singles from Back to the Country
- 1. "The Pill" Released: January 27, 1975

Back to the Country is the twenty-fifth solo studio album by American country music singer-songwriter Loretta Lynn. It was released on February 3, 1975, by MCA Records.

The album's single, "The Pill", a controversial song about birth control, brought Lynn much notoriety in the media and was banned on a number of radio stations, although the single was reportedly her best selling of the decade.

== Critical reception ==
Professional ratings
Review scores
Source	Rating
AllMusic	2.5/5 stars

In the February 15, 1975 issue, Billboard published a review that said, "Is this the Loretta we know? Singing about "The Pill" (her runaway hit single), a barroom fight, skinny dipping, sharing a bed and other such infidelities. It's down to earth country, and no one can sing that sort of song the way Loretta does it. The only amazing thing about it is that she doesn't sing a single one of her own songs. But she does others, including those previously performed by Marie Osmond, Billy Swan, Cal Smith, and a turn-around-version of a Conway Twitty hit."

Cashbox also published a review in their February 15 issue which said, "Loretta Lynn will always be No. 1 among her fans and with the chart positions she holds. Each release, single or LP, hits the same for her and MCA. Another fine collection including "Will You Be There", "Paper Roses", "Mad Mrs. Jesse Brown", "Back to the Country", "I Can Help", and lots more good country cuts. Loretta never left the country, but we like the "back to."

== Commercial performance ==
The album peaked at No. 2 on the US Billboard Hot Country LPs chart and No. 182 on the Billboard Top LP's and Tape chart.

The album's only single, "The Pill", was released in January 1975 and peaked at No. 5 on the US Billboard Hot Country Singles chart and No. 70 on the US Billboard Hot 100, despite being banned by a number of radio stations. The single was also successful in Canada, where it peaked at No. 1 on the RPM Country Singles chart and No. 49 on the RPM Top Singles chart.

== Recording ==
Recording sessions for the album began on August 29, 1974, at Bradley's Barn in Mount Juliet, Tennessee. Three additional sessions followed on December 17, 18, and 19. Three songs on the album were from recording sessions for previous albums. "The Pill" and "The Hands of Yesterday" were recorded during the December 12, 1972 session for 1973's Entertainer of the Year. "Paper Roses" was recorded on March 4, 1974, during a session for 1974's They Don't Make 'Em Like My Daddy.

== Track listing ==
Side one
No.	Title	Writer(s)	Recording date	Length
1.	"The Pill"	Lorene Allen; Don McHan; T. D. Bayless	December 12, 1972	2:35
2.	"Will You Be There?"	Gene Dunlop; Lee Miller	December 18, 1974	2:19
3.	"It's Time to Pay the Fiddler"	Don Wayne; Walter Haynes	December 17, 1974	3:51
4.	"Paper Roses"	Janice Torre; Fred Spielman	March 4, 1974	3:15
5.	"You Love Everybody But You"	Tom T. Hall	August 29, 1974	3:15
6.	"Mad Mrs. Jesse Brown"	Ronnie Rogers	December 19, 1974	3:24

Side two
No.	Title	Writer(s)	Recording date	Length
1.	"Back to the Country"	Tracey Lee	December 19, 1974	2:19
2.	"The Hands of Yesterday"	Ray Griff	December 12, 1972	2:54
3.	"I Can Help"	Billy Swan	December 19, 1974	2:52
4.	"Another You"	Jimmy Peppers	December 18, 1974	2:35
5.	"Jimmy on My Mind"	Conway Twitty	December 18, 1974	2:50

== Personnel ==
Adapted from the album liner notes.

- Bobby Bradley – engineer
- Owen Bradley – producer
- Harold Bradley – electric guitar, bass guitar
- Ray Edenton – rhythm guitar
- Vic Gabany – engineer
- Johnny Gimble – fiddle
- Bud Gray – photography
- Buddy Harman – drums
- The Jordanaires – background vocals
- Millie Kirkham – background vocals
- Billy Linneman – bass
- Loretta Lynn – lead vocals
- Grady Martin – lead electric guitar
- Charlie McCoy – harmonica
- Bob Moore – bass
- Joe Mills – engineer
- Hargus "Pig" Robbins – piano
- Hal Rugg – steel guitar
- Jerry Smith – piano
- Pete Wade – rhythm guitar

== Charts ==
=== Weekly charts ===
Album

Chart (1975)	Peak position
US Hot Country LP's (Billboard)	2
US Top LP's & Tape (Billboard)	182

=== Year-end charts ===
Chart (1975)	Position
US Top Country Albums (Billboard)	29

=== Singles ===
Title	Year	Peak position			
Title	Year	US Country	US	CAN Country	CAN
"The Pill"	1974	5	70	1	49
