= Louisiana Woman, Mississippi Man (song) =

Single by Conway Twitty and Loretta Lynn

from the album Louisiana Woman, Mississippi Man
- B-side: "Living Together Alone"
- Released: May 28, 1973
- Studio: Bradley's Barn, Mt. Juliet, Tennessee
- Genre: Country, bluegrass, country rock
- Length: 2:29
- Label: MCA
- Songwriters: Becki Bluefield; Jim Owen
- Producer: Owen Bradley

Conway Twitty and Loretta Lynn singles chronology
"Lead Me On" (1971)	"Louisiana Woman, Mississippi Man" (1973)	"As Soon as I Hang Up the Phone" (1973)

"Louisiana Woman, Mississippi Man" is a song written by Becki Bluefield and Jim Owen, and recorded as a duet by American country music artists Conway Twitty and Loretta Lynn. It was released in May 1973 as the first single and title track from the album of the same name. The song was their third number one on the country chart as a duo. The single would stay at number one for one week and spend a total of 13 weeks on the country chart.

== Critical reception ==
Billboard magazine reviewed the song favorably, saying that the song has an "up-tempo Cajun sound" and that the pair "comes off beautifully." It goes on to say that the song is a "change of pace and, naturally, well produced."

== Content ==
The song details the travails of a couple geographically separated by the Mississippi River. They emphatically pledge that their love is too great to let the wide distance of the river keep them separated. The man pledges to somehow cross the river while the woman claims she will go so far as to swim the distance (one mile, the song claims).

== Appearances in other media ==
The song appears in the Grand Theft Auto: San Andreas video game soundtrack, on the fictitious radio station K-Rose.

== Chart performance ==
Chart (1973)	Peak position
Canadian RPM Country Tracks	1
US Billboard Country Songs	1

== Certifications ==
Region	Certification	Certified units/sales
United States (RIAA)	Gold	500,000^{‡}
^{‡} Sales+streaming figures based on certification alone.
