= El Paso City (album) =

Studio album by Marty Robbins
- Released: 1976
- Studio: Bradley's Barn, Mount Juliet, Tennessee
- Genre: Country
- Label: Columbia Records
- Producer: Billy Sherrill

Marty Robbins chronology
No Signs of Loneliness Here (1976)	El Paso City (1976)	Adios Amigo (1977)

El Paso City is a studio album by country music singer Marty Robbins. It was released in 1976 by Columbia Records. Billy Sherrill was the producer.

The album debuted on Billboard magazine's country album chart on September 4, 1976, peaked at No. 1, and remained on the chart for a total of 28 weeks. The album included the No. 1 hit single, "El Paso City".

AllMusic gave the album a rating of four-and-a-half stars.

== Track listing ==
Side A

1. "El Paso City"
2. "Ava Maria Morales"
3. "I'm Gonna Miss You When You Go"
4. "Kin to the Wind"
5. "Way Out There"

Side B

1. "The Ballad of Bill Thaxton"
2. "Trail Dreamin'"
3. "I Did What I Did for Maria"
4. "She's Just a Drifter"
5. "Among My Souvenirs"
