= Feelins' =

Single by Conway Twitty and Loretta Lynn

from the album Feelins'
- B-side: "You Done Lost Your Baby"
- Released: June 2, 1975
- Genre: Country
- Label: MCA
- Songwriter(s): Troy Seals; Will Jennings; Don Goodman
- Producer(s): Owen Bradley

Conway Twitty and Loretta Lynn singles chronology
"As Soon as I Hang Up the Phone" (1974)	"Feelins'" (1975)	"The Letter" (1976)

"Feelins'" is a song written by Troy Seals, Will Jennings and Don Goodman, and recorded by American country music artists Conway Twitty and Loretta Lynn as a duet. It was released in June 1975 as the first single and title track from the album Feelins'. The song was the fifth and final number one for the duo of Conway Twitty and Loretta Lynn. The single stayed at number one for one week and spent a total of 13 weeks on the chart.

== Chart performance ==
Chart (1975)	Peak position
U.S. Billboard Hot Country Singles	1
Canadian RPM Country Tracks	2
