= Out of My Head and Back in My Bed (song) =

Single by Loretta Lynn

from the album Out of My Head and Back in My Bed
- B-side: "Old Rooster"
- Released: November 14, 1977
- Recorded: 28 June 1976
- Studio: Bradley's Barn, Mount Juliet, Tennessee
- Genre: Country
- Label: MCA
- Songwriter(s): Peggy Forman
- Producer(s): Owen Bradley

Loretta Lynn singles chronology
| "Why Can't He Be You" (1977) | "Out of My Head and Back in My Bed" (1977) | "Spring Fever" (1978) |

"Out of My Head and Back in My Bed" is a 1977 single written by Peggy Forman and recorded by Loretta Lynn. It was Lynn's twelfth-and-last number one on the U.S. country music chart as a solo artist. The single stayed at number one for two weeks and spent a total of eleven weeks on the chart.

== Chart performance ==
| Chart (1977–1978) | Peak position |
|---|---|
| U.S. Billboard Hot Country Singles | 1 |
| Canadian RPM Country Tracks | 1 |
