= When the Tingle Becomes a Chill (song) =

Single by Loretta Lynn

from the album When the Tingle Becomes a Chill
- B-side: "All I Want From You (Is Away)"
- Released: October 1975
- Recorded: August 29, 1974
- Studio: Bradley's Barn, Mt. Juliet, Tennessee
- Genre: Country
- Length: 3:01
- Label: MCA
- Songwriter: Lola Jean Dillon
- Producer: Owen Bradley

Loretta Lynn singles chronology
| "Home" (1975) | "When the Tingle Becomes a Chill" (1975) | "Red, White and Blue" (1975) |

"When the Tingle Becomes a Chill" is a song written by Lola Jean Dillon that was originally performed by American country music artist Loretta Lynn. It was released as a single in October 1975 via MCA Records.

== Background and reception ==
"When the Tingle Becomes a Chill" was recorded at Bradley's Barn studio in Mount Juliet, Tennessee on August 29, 1974. The session was produced by the studio's owner, renowned country music producer Owen Bradley. Two additional tracks were recorded during this session.

"When the Tingle Becomes a Chill" reached number two on the Billboard Hot Country Singles survey in 1976. Additionally, the song peaked at number three on the Canadian RPM Country Songs chart during the same period. It was included on her studio album, When the Tingle Becomes a Chill (1976).

== Track listings ==
7" vinyl single

- "When the Tingle Becomes a Chill" – 2:59
- "All I Want from You (Is Away)" – 2:13

== Charts ==
| Chart (1975–1976) | Peak position |
|---|---|
| Canada Country Songs (RPM) | 3 |
| US Hot Country Singles (Billboard) | 2 |
