= Louisiana Woman, Mississippi Man =

Studio album by Conway Twitty and Loretta Lynn
- Released: July 9, 1973
- Recorded: March 6–April 5, 1973
- Studios: Bradley's Barn, Mount Juliet, Tennessee
- Genre: Country
- Length: 28:57
- Label: MCA
- Producer: Owen Bradley

Conway Twitty and Loretta Lynn chronology
Lead Me On (1972)	Louisiana Woman, Mississippi Man (1973)	Country Partners (1974)

Conway Twitty chronology
You've Never Been This Far Before (1973)	Louisiana Woman, Mississippi Man (1973)	Honky Tonk Angel (1974)

Loretta Lynn chronology
Entertainer of the Year (1973)	Louisiana Woman, Mississippi Man (1973)	Love Is the Foundation (1973)

Singles from Louisiana Woman, Mississippi Man
- 1. "Louisiana Woman, Mississippi Man" Released: May 28, 1973

Louisiana Woman, Mississippi Man is the third collaborative studio album by Conway Twitty and Loretta Lynn. It was released on July 9, 1973, by MCA Records.

== Critical reception ==
Professional ratings
Review scores
Source	Rating
AllMusic	4.5/5 stars

In the July 21, 1973 issue, Billboard published a review of the album, which said that "Each time they sing together, they make even better music. Good close harmony throughout. Once again, an excellent selection of songs, under the guiding hand of the old master, Owen Bradley, plus his superb production. This team just mixes well, and fans of both will be pleased with the results." The review noted "For Heaven's Sake", "Easy on My Mind", "As Good as a Lonely Girl Can Be", and "What Are We Gonna Do About Us" as the best cuts on the album. It also included a note to dealers, saying that "Despite an unflattering picture of Miss Lynn on the cover, their total fans are legion, and this could outsell all the others."

The review in the July 21, 1973 issue of Cashbox said, "This is a super album from possibly the greatest country duo that ever stepped into a pair of matching Tony Lama boots. What makes them great is the quality of their vocals, the insight and depth of feeling they bring to each song (they mean every word they sing), and the diversity of their material. Each song is different, and each one stands tall. No "sameness." Heavy cuts, recommended for airplay include: "Bye Bye Love", "Living Together Alone", "If You Touch Me", "What Are We Gonna Do About Us," "As Good as a Lonely Girl Can Be," and natch, the title cut."

== Commercial performance ==
The album peaked at No. 1 on the US Billboard Hot Country LPs chart, becoming the duo's first album to top the chart. The album also peaked at No. 153 on the US Billboard Top LPs & Tape chart.

The album's only single, "Louisiana Woman, Mississippi Man", was released in May 1973 and also peaked at No. 1 on the US Billboard Hot Country Singles chart, the duo's third consecutive single to top the chart. In Canada, the single peaked at No. 1 on the RPM Country Singles chart, the duo's second single to top the chart.

== Recording ==
Recording sessions for the album took place at Bradley's Barn in Mount Juliet, Tennessee, beginning on March 6 and 7, 1973. Three additional sessions followed on April 3, 4 and 5.

== Track listing ==
Side one
No.	Title	Writer(s)	Recording date	Length
1.	"Louisiana Woman, Mississippi Man"	Becki Bluefield; Jim Owen	March 6, 1973	2:29
2.	"For Heaven's Sake"	Lorene Allen; Frankie Fuller; Maggie Vaughn	March 7, 1973	2:38
3.	"Release Me"	Eddie Miller; W.S. Stevenson	April 4, 1973	2:56
4.	"You Lay So Easy on My Mind"	Charles Fields; Bobby G. Rice; Donald Riis	April 4, 1973	2:47
5.	"Our Conscience, You and Me"	L.E. White	April 5, 1973	2:23
6.	"As Good as a Lonely Girl Can Be"	Bobby Harden	March 7, 1973	2:53

Side two
No.	Title	Writer(s)	Recording date	Length
1.	"Bye Bye Love"	Felice Bryant; Boudleaux Bryant	April 3, 1973	2:54
2.	"Living Together Alone"	Sandy Burnett; Joe McClure	March 7, 1973	2:14
3.	"What Are We Gonna Do About Us?"	Conway Twitty	April 4, 1973	2:47
4.	"If You Touch Me"	Joe Stampley; Carmol Taylor; Norro Wilson	April 3, 1973	2:08
5.	"Before Your Time"	Tommy Markham; Twitty	April 3, 1973	2:48

== Personnel ==
Adapted from the album liner notes and Decca recording session records.

- Harold Bradley – bass guitar
- Owen Bradley – producer
- Ray Edenton – acoustic guitar
- John Hughey – steel
- Darrel Johnson - mastering
- Loretta Lynn – lead vocals
- Tommy Markham – drums
- Grady Martin – guitar
- Bob Moore – bass
- The Nashville Sounds – background vocals
- The Jordanaires – background vocals
- Hargus Robbins – piano
- Conway Twitty – lead vocals

== Charts ==
Album

Chart (1973)	Peak position
US Hot Country LPs (Billboard)	1
US Top LPs & Tape (Billboard)	153

Singles

Title	Year	Peak position	
Title	Year	US Country	CAN Country
"Louisiana Woman, Mississippi Man"	1973	1	1
