= Somebody Somewhere (Don't Know What He's Missin' Tonight) =

Single by Loretta Lynn

from the album Somebody Somewhere
- B-side: "Sundown Tavern"
- Released: August 23, 1976
- Recorded: 29 June 1976
- Studio: Bradley's Barn, Mt. Juliet, Tennessee
- Genre: Country
- Label: MCA
- Songwriter: Lola Jean Dillon
- Producer: Owen Bradley

Loretta Lynn singles chronology
| "Red, White and Blue" (1976) | "Somebody Somewhere (Don't Know What He's Missin' Tonight)" (1976) | "She's Got You" (1977) |

"Somebody Somewhere (Don't Know What He's Missin' Tonight)" is a 1976 single written by Lola Jean Dillon and recorded by Loretta Lynn. "Somebody Somewhere (Don't Know What He's Missin' Tonight)" was Loretta Lynn's ninth number one on the country chart as a solo artist. The single stayed at number one for two weeks and spent a total of twelve weeks on the chart.

== Chart performance ==
| Chart (1976) | Peak position |
|---|---|
| U.S. Billboard Hot Country Singles | 1 |
| Canadian RPM Country Tracks | 1 |
