= Somebody Somewhere (album) =

Studio album by Loretta Lynn
- Released: October 4, 1976
- Recorded: January 19, 1972 – June 30, 1976
- Studio: Bradley's Barn, Mount Juliet, Tennessee
- Genre: Country
- Length: 26:42
- Label: MCA
- Producer: Owen Bradley

Loretta Lynn chronology
United Talent (1976)	Somebody Somewhere (1976)	I Remember Patsy (1977)

Singles from Somebody Somewhere
- 1. "Somebody Somewhere" Released: August 23, 1976

Somebody Somewhere is the twenty-eighth solo studio album by American country music singer-songwriter Loretta Lynn. It was released on October 4, 1976, by MCA Records.

== Commercial performance ==
The album peaked at No. 1 on the Billboard Top Country Albums chart, Lynn's sixth solo album to top the chart. The album's single, "Somebody Somewhere (Don't Know What He's Missin' Tonight)" peaked at No. 1 on the Billboard Hot Country Songs chart, Lynn's ninth solo single to top the chart.

== Recording ==
Recording sessions for the album took place on June 28, June 29 and 30, 1976 at Bradley's Barn studio in Mount Juliet, Tennessee. Six of the album's ten track were from previous recording sessions. The earliest recording featured on the album, "While He's Making Love (I'm Making Believe)", was recorded on January 19, 1972, during a session for 1972's One's on the Way. "Blue Eyed Kentucky Girl" was the second song to be released from a session on March 5, 1973. "Crawling Man" and "Me and Ole Crazy Bill" were recorded on June 18 and 19, 1974, respectively, during sessions for 1974's They Don't Make 'Em Like My Daddy. "Playing with Fire", recorded on January 31, 1975, and "The Games That Daddies Play", recorded on April 16, 1975, are the only two songs ever released from their respective sessions.

== Track listing ==
Side one
No.	Title	Writer(s)	Recording date	Length
1.	"Somebody Somewhere"	Lola Jean Dillon	June 29, 1976	3:00
2.	"Sundown Tavern"	Tracey Lee	June 30, 1976	2:25
3.	"The Games That Daddies Play"	Conway Twitty	April 16, 1975	2:50
4.	"While He's Making Love (I'm Making Believe)"	Frances Rhodes	January 19, 1972	2:32
5.	"Crawling Man"	David Wilkins	June 18, 1974	2:29

Side two
No.	Title	Writer(s)	Recording date	Length
1.	"Me and Ole Crazy Bill"	Bill Dees, Wes Helm	June 19, 1974	3:17
2.	"I'll Leave the Leavin' Up to You"	Ken Jones, Lamar Morris	June 29, 1976	2:28
3.	"Your Woman, Your Friend"	Peggy Forman	June 28, 1976	2:19
4.	"Playing with Fire"	Lola Jean Dillon	January 31, 1975	2:28
5.	"Blue Eyed Kentucky Girl"	Bobby Harden	March 5, 1973	2:54

== Personnel ==
Adapted from album liner notes.

- Bobby Bradley – engineer
- Harold Bradley – bass guitar
- Owen Bradley – producer
- Ray Edenton – rhythm guitar
- Darrell Johnson – mastering
- Grady Martin – lead guitar
- Joe Mills – engineer
- Charlie McCoy – harmonica
- Bob Moore – bass
- Hargus "Pig" Robbins – piano
- Hal Rugg – steel guitar

== Charts ==
=== Weekly charts ===
Chart (1976)	Peak position
US Top Country Albums (Billboard)	1

=== Year-end charts ===
Chart (1977)	Position
US Top Country Albums (Billboard)	18

=== Singles ===
Year	Single	Chart	Peak position
1976	"Somebody Somewhere (Don't Know What He's Missin' Tonight"	Country Singles	1
