= Live from the Wheeling Jamboree =

Live album by Loretta Lynn
- Released: 1986
- Recorded: circa 1986
- Genre: Country
- Label: Loretta Lynn, Inc.; MCA

Loretta Lynn chronology
Just a Woman (1985)	Live from the Wheeling Jamboree (1986)	Who Was That Stranger (1988)

Live from the Wheeling Jamboree is a live album by American country singer-songwriter Loretta Lynn. It was released in 1986 in conjunction with MCA Records and Loretta Lynn Enterprises, Inc. It was the second live album of Lynn's career and contained a total of 22 tracks.

== Background, content and release ==
In the early 1980s, Loretta Lynn's chart success began declining. In 1985, she had her final major hit with the single "Heart Don't Do This to Me." However, she remained popular as a touring act. During this period, Lynn appeared on several live television programs, including the Wheeling Jamboree, which was broadcast on WWVA in West Virginia. At the same concert, Lynn recorded her second live album. The broadcast took place in 1986.

The album contained a total of 22 tracks. The track listing contained an assortment of Lynn's signature recordings, major hits and dialogue by other performers. Among the signature recordings is "Coal Miner's Daughter" and "You Ain't Woman Enough (To Take My Man)." Also featured was the recent hits "I Lie" and "We've Come a Long Way Baby." Dialogue such as introductory speeches by Lynn's children and band members is also featured.

Live from the Wheeling Jamboree was released in 1986 on Loretta Lynn Enterprises, Inc. in conjunction with MCA Records. It was Lynn's second album release through her own copyrighted company. The album was issued as a vinyl LP, containing 13 tracks on side one and nine tracks on side two. It was also issued as an audio cassette in 1986. The project did not reach any peak positions on national publication charts, notably Billboard. It also did not spawn any singles to radio.

== Track listing ==
Side one
No.	Title	Length
1.	"Ernie's Intro"
2.	"Ruin My Bad Reputation"
3.	"Loretta's Intro"
4.	"You're Lookin' at Country"
5.	"I Lie"
6.	"Lyin', Cheatin', Woman Chasin', Honky Tonkin', Whiskey Drinkin' You"
7.	"You Ain't Woman Enough to Take My Man"
8.	"When the Tingle Becomes a Chill"
9.	"Dialogue (Loretta)"
10.	"One's on the Way"
11.	"The Pill"
12.	"Beacon"
13.	"Band Intro"

Side two
No.	Title	Length
1.	"Band Intro"
2.	"Cissy's Intro"
3.	"Heartache"
4.	"Elvira"
5.	"Honky Tonk Girl"
6.	"Patsy Cline Medley"
7.	"Long Way Baby"
8.	"God Bless America Again"
9.	"Coal Miner's Daughter"

== Personnel ==
All credits are adapted from the liner notes of Live from the Wheeling Jamboree.

Musical and technical personnel

- Jill Barnes – design
- Matt Barnes – design
- James and Company – album graphics
- Cissy Lynn – lead vocals
- Ernest Ray Lynn – lead vocals
- Loretta Lynn – lead vocals

== Release history ==
Region	Date	Format	Label	Ref.
Canada	1986	Vinyl	Loretta Lynn Enterprises, Inc.; MCA Records	
United States	1986	Vinyl	Loretta Lynn Enterprises, Inc.; MCA Records	
United States	1986	Cassette	Loretta Lynn Enterprises, Inc.; MCA Records	
