= Just a Woman =

Just a Woman can refer to:

- Just a Woman (album), a 1985 album by Loretta Lynn
  - "Just a Woman" (song), a 1985 song from the album of the same name
- Just a Woman (1918 film), a 1918 film
- Just a Woman (1925 film), a 1925 film
