= You're Lookin' at Country =

You're Lookin' at Country may refer to:

- You're Lookin' at Country (song), a 1971 single by Loretta Lynn
- You're Lookin' at Country (album), a 1971 album by Loretta Lynn
