= Blue Eyed Kentucky Girl =

Compilation album by Loretta Lynn
- Released: 1985
- Recorded: 1964–1980
- Genre: Country
- Length: 27:22
- Label: MCA
- Producer: Owen Bradley

Loretta Lynn chronology
Lyin', Cheatin', Woman Chasin', Honky Tonkin', Whiskey Drinkin' You (1983)	Blue Eyed Kentucky Girl (1985)	Just a Woman (1985)

Blue Eyed Kentucky Girl is a compilation album by American country singer-songwriter Loretta Lynn. It was released in 1985 via MCA Records and was produced by Owen Bradley. The album included ten previously recorded hits by Lynn during a fifteen-year time span. All of the album's recordings were first cut on MCA/Decca Records.

== Background, release and reception ==
Blue Eyed Kentucky Girl was part of a series of compilations MCA released by Loretta Lynn during the 1980s. A total of ten tracks were included on the album package. The songs chosen were recorded in sessions over a fifteen-year time-span between 1964 and 1980. Eight of the album's tracks had been among Lynn's biggest hits in her career. This included signature songs, such as "Coal Miner's Daughter"(1970), "You're Lookin' at Country" (1971) and "The Pill." Also included were other hits, such as "Somebody Led Me Away" (1981) and "The Home You're Tearing Down" (1965). All of the album's sessions had originally been produced by Owen Bradley, Lynn's long-time producer at MCA.

Blue Eyed Kentucky Girl had first been released in 1985 via MCA Records. It was offered as both a compact disc and an audio cassette. It was later released again On November 15, 1995 via Universal Special Products on a cassette. The album did not reach any peak positions on any music publication charts, including Billboard. It also did not spawn any singles to radio. The album was reviewed by Hank Small of Allmusic following its re-release: "Blue Eyed Kentucky Girl assembles ten tracks from Loretta Lynn's 1970s recordings for RCA [MCA], perhaps the singer's most creatively fertile period."

== Track listing ==
=== CD version ===
No.	Title	Writer(s)	Length
1.	"Coal Miner's Daughter"	Loretta Lynn	3:02
2.	"Rated "X""	Lynn	2:41
3.	"Blue Eyed Kentucky Girl"	Bobby Harden	2:58
4.	"When the Tingle Becomes a Chill"	Lola Jean Dillon	3:06
5.	"The Pill"	Lorene Allen; T.D. Bayless; Lynn; Don McHan	2:38
6.	"Somebody Led Me Away"	Dillon	2:41
7.	"Another Man Loved Me Last Night"	Allen; Peggy Sue Wells	2:41
8.	"You're Lookin' at Country"	Lynn	2:19
9.	"The Home You're Tearing Down"	Betty Sue Perry	2:44
10.	"What Kind of a Girl (Do You Think I Am)"	Lynn; Teddy Wilburn	2:52
Total length:			27:22

=== Cassette version ===
No.	Title	Writer(s)	Length
1.	"Coal Miner's Daughter"	Lynn	3:02
2.	"Rated "X""	Lynn	2:41
3.	"Blue Eyed Kentucky Girl"	Harden	2:58
4.	"When the Tingle Becomes a Chill"	Dillon	3:06
5.	"The Pill"	Allen; Bayless; Lynn; McHan	2:38

No.	Title	Writer(s)	Length
1.	"Somebody Led Me Away"	Dillon	2:41
2.	"Another Man Loved Me Last Night"	Allen; Wells	2:41
3.	"You're Lookin' at Country"	Lynn	2:19
4.	"The Home You're Tearing Down"	Perry	2:44
5.	"What Kind of a Girl (Do You Think I Am)"	Lynn; Wilburn	2:52

== Personnel ==
All credits are adapted from the liner notes of Blue Eyed Kentucky Girl.

Musical and technical personnel

- Owen Bradley – producer
- Steve Hoffman – compiled credits
- Loretta Lynn – lead vocals, harmony vocals

== Release history ==
Region	Date	Format	Label	Ref.
Canada	1985	Cassette	MCA Records	
United States	1985	Cassette	MCA Records	
United States	1985	Compact disc	MCA Records	
United States	November 15, 1995	Cassette	Universal Special Products	
