= I Wanna Be Free (album) =

Studio album by Loretta Lynn
- Released: May 3, 1971
- Recorded: May 14, 1969–March 30, 1971
- Studios: Bradley's Barn, Mount Juliet, Tennessee
- Genre: Country
- Length: 28:50
- Label: Decca
- Producer: Owen Bradley

Loretta Lynn chronology
We Only Make Believe (1971)	I Wanna Be Free (1971)	You're Lookin' at Country (1971)

Singles from I Wanna Be Free
- 1. "I Wanna Be Free" Released: February 22, 1971

I Wanna Be Free is the seventeenth solo studio album by American country music singer-songwriter Loretta Lynn. It was released on May 3, 1971, by Decca Records.

== Critical reception ==
Professional ratings
Review scores
Source	Rating
AllMusic	2.5/5 stars
Christgau's Record Guide	B

In the issue dated May 22, 1971, Billboard published a review which said, "Miss Lynn's latest album spotlights her current country hit, "I Wanna Be Free", and features excellent versions of "Help Me Make It Through the Night", "Me and Bobby McGee" and "Rose Garden". Among the originals, "Drive You Out of My Mind" and "I'm One Man's Woman" stand out.

Cashbox published a review in the May 15, 1971 issue which said, "The most difficult thing for a popular recording artist to do is to maintain his or her popularity via records and live appearances. Loretta Lynn has found that to be no task at all. In fact, as the years pass, she becomes more popular. "I Wanna Be Free" is the title of Loretta's latest chart single, and this album of the same name is likely to soar to the top of the country charts as fast as the single. "Me and Bobby McGee", "When You're Poor", "See That Mountain", and "Put Your Hand in the Hand" are included."

== Commercial performance ==
The album peaked at No. 5 on the US Billboard Hot Country LP's chart and No. 110 on the US Billboard Top LP's chart.

The album's only single, "I Wanna Be Free", was released in February 1971 and peaked at No. 3 on the US Billboard Hot Country Singles chart and No. 94 on the US Billboard Hot 100 chart. In Canada, the single peaked at No. 1 on the RPM Country Singles chart.

== Recording ==
Recording sessions for the album began on November 25, 1970, at Bradley's Barn studio in Mount Juliet, Tennessee. Two additional sessions followed on March 29 and March 30, 1971. Four songs on the album were recorded during earlier sessions for other albums. "I'm One Man's Woman" was recorded on May 14, 1969, during sessions for 1969's Woman of the World/To Make a Man. "Drive You Out of My Mind" was recorded during the October 2, 1969 session for 1970's Wings Upon Your Horns. "If I Never Love Again (It Will Be Too Soon)" and "When You Leave My World" were recorded during sessions for 1971's Coal Miner's Daughter, on April 9 and July 14, 1970, respectively.

== Track listing ==
Side one
No.	Title	Writer(s)	Recording date	Length
1.	"I Wanna Be Free"	Loretta Lynn	November 25, 1970	2:16
2.	"Help Me Make It Through the Night"	Kris Kristofferson	March 29, 1971	2:28
3.	"See That Mountain"	Connie Moore	March 29, 1971	2:35
4.	"When You Leave My World"	Sharon Higgins	July 14, 1970	2:59
5.	"Put Your Hand in the Hand"	Gene MacLellan	March 29, 1971	2:27
6.	"If I Never Love Again (It Will Be Too Soon)"	Lynn; Teddy Wilburn	April 9, 1970	2:30

Side two
No.	Title	Writer(s)	Recording date	Length
1.	"Me and Bobby McGee"	Fred Foster; Kristofferson	March 29, 1971	2:38
2.	"When You're Poor"	Tracy Lee	March 30, 1971	2:10
3.	"Rose Garden"	Joe South	March 30, 1971	2:26
4.	"Drive You Out of My Mind"	Lynn; Lorene Allen	October 2, 1969	2:41
5.	"I'm One Man's Woman"	Lynn; Peggy Sue Wells	May 14, 1969	2:41

== Personnel ==
Adapted from the album liner notes and Decca recording session records.

- Harold Bradley – electric bass guitar
- Owen Bradley – producer
- Ray Edenton – guitar, acoustic guitar
- Buddy Harman – drums
- Junior Huskey – bass
- Darrell Johnson – mastering
- The Jordanaires – background vocals
- Loretta Lynn – lead vocals
- Grady Martin – guitar, lead electric guitar
- Bob Moore – bass
- Hargus Robbins – piano
- Hal Rugg – steel guitar, dobro
- Dale Sellars – guitar
- Bob Thompson – banjo
- Pete Wade – guitar
- Teddy Wilburn – liner notes

== Charts ==
Album

Chart (1971)	Peak position
US Hot Country LP's (Billboard)	5
US Top LP's (Billboard)	110

Singles

Title	Year	Peak position		
Title	Year	US Country	US	CAN Country
"I Wanna Be Free"	1971	3	94	1
