= Who Was That Stranger (song) =

Single by Loretta Lynn

from the album Who Was That Stranger
- B-side: "Elzie Banks"
- Released: April 1988
- Recorded: December 8, 1987
- Studio: Emerald Sound Studio
- Genre: Country; traditional country
- Length: 2:08
- Label: MCA
- Songwriter(s): Max D. Barnes; Don Cook; Curly Putman
- Producer(s): Jimmy Bowen; Chip Hardy; Loretta Lynn

Loretta Lynn singles chronology
"Just a Woman" (1988)	"Who Was That Stranger" (1988)	"Fly Away" (1988)

"Who Was That Stranger" is a song composed by Max D. Barnes, Don Cook and Curly Putman. It was originally recorded by American country artist Loretta Lynn. It was released as a single and became a minor hit on the American country music charts in 1988. It was released on an album of the same. It was among Lynn's final single releases on MCA Records and among her final charting releases.

== Background and release ==
"Who Was That Stranger" was recorded at the Emerald Sound Studio in Nashville, Tennessee on December 8, 1987. The single's eventual B-side, "Elzie Banks," was recorded during the same session. The session was co-produced by Jimmy Bowen and Chip Hardy. Bowen had become Lynn's record producer in 1985 after the departure of her longtime producer, Owen Bradley. Bowen had previously produced Lynn's 1985 album, Just a Woman and her 1988 album with Conway Twitty. In addition to Bowen and Hardy, Lynn also served as the single's co-producer.

The song was released as a single in April 1988 via MCA Records. It spent a total of 12 weeks on the Billboard Hot Country Singles chart before reaching number 57 in April 1988. The single was the title track to Lynn's corresponding 1988 album, Who Was That Stranger. The song was among Lynn's final single releases for her longtime record label, MCA Records. She would depart from the label the same year. "Who Was That Stranger" was also among Lynn's final charting singles on the Billboard country chart in her music career.

== Track listing ==
7" vinyl single

- "Who Was That Stranger" – 2:08
- "Elzie Banks" – 2:46

== Chart performance ==
Chart (1988)	Peak position
US Hot Country Songs (Billboard)	57
