= Making Love from Memory (song) =

Single by Loretta Lynn

from the album Making Love from Memory
- B-side: "Don't It Feel Good"
- Released: August 1982
- Recorded: May 1982
- Studio: Music City Music Hall (Nashville, Tennessee)
- Genre: Country
- Length: 3:21
- Label: MCA
- Songwriters: Nilda Daniel; Sidney L. Linard
- Producer: Owen Bradley

Loretta Lynn singles chronology
"I Lie" (1982)	"Making Love from Memory" (1982)	"Breakin' It" (1983)

"Making Love from Memory" is a song written by Nilda Daniel and Sidney L. Linard that was originally performed by American country music artist Loretta Lynn. It was released as a single in August 1982 via MCA Records.

== Background and reception ==
"Making Love from Memory" was recorded at the Music City Music Hall in May 1982. Located in Nashville, Tennessee, the session was produced by renowned country music producer Owen Bradley. The session also included Lynn's next single "Breakin' It".

"Making Love from Memory" reached number nineteen on the Billboard Hot Country Singles survey in 1982. Additionally, it reached a minor position in Canada, peaking at number forty one on the Canadian RPM Country Songs chart during this same period. It was included on her studio album, Making Love from Memory (1982).

== Track listings ==
7" vinyl single

- "Making Love from Memory" – 3:21
- "Don't It Feel Good" – 2:27

== Charts ==
Chart (1982)	Peak position
Canada Country Songs (RPM)	41
US Hot Country Singles (Billboard)	19
