= Wouldn't It Be Great (song) =

Single by Loretta Lynn

from the album Just a Woman
- B-side: "One Man Band"
- Released: October 1985
- Recorded: March 1985
- Studio: Emerald Sound Studio
- Genre: Country; Countrypolitan
- Length: 2:57
- Label: MCA Records
- Songwriter: Loretta Lynn
- Producers: Jimmy Bowen; Loretta Lynn

Loretta Lynn singles chronology
"Heart Don't Do This to Me" (1985)	"Wouldn't It Be Great" (1985)	"Just a Woman" (1986)

"Wouldn't It Be Great" is a song written and first recorded by American country artist Loretta Lynn. It was originally released as a single in 1985, becoming a minor hit on the national country charts following its release. It was then released on Lynn's 1985 album. In 2018, it was re-recorded and re-released as a single, becoming the title track for her 2018 studio album.

== Original version ==
"Wouldn't It Be Great" was composed by Lynn and was the final song she sang to her husband, Dolittle Lynn, before his passing. In a 2018 interview, she explained her reasoning behind its composition: "My husband liked to drink a lot and that's where that song comes from. ‘Say you love me just one time, with a sober mind. I always liked that song, but I never liked to sing it around Doo."

"Wouldn't It Be Great" was recorded in Nashville, Tennessee at the Emerald Sound Studio in March 1985. The sessions was produced by Jimmy Bowen. The album was Lynn's first production assignment with Bowen. Lynn had been produced for over two decade by Owen Bradley prior to this. In addition, Lynn also co-produced the single with Bowen. It was among the first times Lynn received production credits on a song.

It was released as a single in October 1985 via MCA Records. It spent a total of five weeks on the Billboard Hot Country Singles chart before reaching number 72 in December. The single was the second spawned from Lynn's 1985 studio album entitled, Just a Woman. A third single would also be released in 1986.

=== Track listing ===
7" vinyl single

- "Wouldn't It Be Great" – 2:57
- "One Man Band" – 2:30

=== Chart performance ===
Chart (1985)	Peak position
US Hot Country Songs (Billboard)	72

== Re-recorded version ==
"Wouldn't It Be Great?"

Single by Loretta Lynn

from the album Wouldn't It Be Great
- Released: August 22, 2018
- Recorded: 2006–2017
- Studio: Cash Cabin Studio (Hendersonville, Tennessee)
- Genre: Country; traditional country
- Length: 3:24
- Label: Legacy
- Songwriter: Loretta Lynn
- Producers: John Carter Cash; Patsy Lynn Russell

Loretta Lynn singles chronology
"Half a Mind" (2018)	"Wouldn't It Be Great?" (2018)	"Ruby's Stool" (2018)

"Wouldn't It Be Great" was notably re-recorded by Loretta Lynn twice more. It was first recorded as a duet between Lynn, Dolly Parton and Tammy Wynette for their 1993 studio release, Honky Tonk Angels. It was the only composition by Lynn to be included on the collaborative effort.

The song was recorded again in the 2000s. Recording took place in several sessions held between 2006 and 2017 at the Cash Cabin Studio. The song was co-produced by John Carter Cash (son of Johnny Cash) and Patsy Lynn Russell (Lynn's daughter). Lynn had originally planned to release the song and its corresponding album in 2017. However, the release was interrupted when Lynn suffered a stroke. Lynn recovered and decided to release the single and album in 2018. "I wasn’t goin’ to let it stop me. You just can’t sit down and say ‘Hey, take me," she recounted.

Titled as "Wouldn't It Be Great?," it was released as the album's first single on August 22, 2018. It was available for download and streaming to all digital platforms at the time. It was the first track offered in promotion for the album. The album of the same name was released in September 2018 via Legacy Recordings.

=== Track listing ===
Digital download

- "Wouldn't It Be Great" – 3:24

=== Accolades ===
Year	Association	Category	Result
2019	Grammy Awards	Best Country Solo Performance	Nominated
