= Wings Upon Your Horns (single) =

Single by Loretta Lynn

from the album Wings Upon Your Horns
- B-side: "Let's Get Back Down to Earth"
- Released: October 1969
- Recorded: October 1, 1969
- Studio: Bradley's Barn, Mount Juliet, Tennessee
- Genre: Country
- Length: 2:35
- Label: Decca
- Songwriter: Loretta Lynn
- Producer: Owen Bradley

Loretta Lynn singles chronology
"To Make a Man (Feel Like a Man)" (1969)	"Wings Upon Your Horns" (1969)	"I Know How" (1970)

"Wings Upon Your Horns" is a song written and performed by American country music artist Loretta Lynn. It was released as a single in October 1969 via Decca Records.

== Background and reception ==
"Wings Upon Your Horns" was recorded on October 1, 1969, at Bradley's Barn recording studio in Mount Juliet, Tennessee, with the session produced by the studio's owner, renowned country music producer Owen Bradley. Two additional tracks were recorded during this session including one of Lynn's signature hits "Coal Miner's Daughter".

"Wings Upon Your Horns" reached number eleven on the Billboard Hot Country Singles survey in 1969. The song became her first secular single since 1963 to miss the top ten slot. Additionally, the song peaked at number five on the Canadian RPM Country Songs chart during this same period. It was included on her studio album, Here's Loretta Singing "Wings Upon Your Horns" (1970).

"Wings Upon Your Horns" has been considered one of Lynn's most controversial recordings. The song describes the loss of a woman's virginity by using religious concepts.

== Track listings ==
7" vinyl single

- "Wings Upon Your Horns" – 2:35
- "Let's Get Back Down to Earth" – 2:01

== Charts ==
=== Weekly charts ===
Chart (1969–1970)	Peak position
Canada Country Songs (RPM)	5
US Hot Country Singles (Billboard)	11
