= We Only Make Believe =

Studio album by Conway Twitty and Loretta Lynn
- Released: February 1, 1971
- Recorded: November 9–11, 1970
- Studios: Bradley's Barn, Mount Juliet, Tennessee
- Genre: Country
- Length: 29:16
- Label: Decca
- Producer: Owen Bradley

Conway Twitty and Loretta Lynn chronology
We Only Make Believe (1971)	Lead Me On (1972)

Conway Twitty chronology
Hits (1971)	We Only Make Believe (1971)	How Much More Can She Stand (1971)

Loretta Lynn chronology
Coal Miner's Daughter (1971)	We Only Make Believe (1971)	I Wanna Be Free (1971)

Singles from We Only Make Believe
- 1. "After the Fire Is Gone" Released: January 4, 1971

We Only Make Believe is the first collaborative studio album by Conway Twitty and Loretta Lynn. It was released on February 1, 1971, by Decca Records.

This was the first of ten albums Twitty and Lynn would release. The album's first track is a cover of Twitty's solo hit "It's Only Make Believe", which Twitty co-wrote with Jack Nance. Lynn wrote two tracks for the album, "Don't Tell Me You're Sorry" and "We Closed Our Eyes to Shame". "I'm So Used to Loving You", another of Twitty's compositions, also appears on the album.

== Critical reception ==
Professional ratings
Review scores
Source	Rating
Allmusic	3/5 stars

Billboard magazine's review of the album in the issue dated February 20, 1971, said, ""After the Fire Is Gone" on this LP is the hit, but Conway Twitty and Loretta Lynn reveal that they've established themselves as a major country duo. Standout tunes include "It's Only Make Believe" and a very sparkling "Pickin' Wild Mountain Berries" that has definite hit appeal. Good LP. Bound to sell big."

In the February 13, 1971 issue, Cashbox published a review on the album, which read, "Needless to say, Conway Twitty and Loretta Lynn are two of the most highly acclaimed country singers. Singularly, each has a string of hit records too numerous to name. Having already released a single together, "After the Fire Is Gone", which is currently on both the country and pop charts, We Only Make Believe is the duo's first album effort. Their first venture includes "We've Closed Our Eyes to Shame", "Don't Tell Me You're Sorry", "Take Me", "The One I Can't Live Without", and the Twitty classic now done with Loretta, "It's Only Make Believe". LP will establish Twitty and Lynn as one of the most popular and talented country duos of all time."

Record World's review of the album said, "This is the one everyone has been anticipating for weeks. The single, "After the Fire Is Gone," is already jumping into charts. Rock-a-billy fans will wig out over cut one, side two. Great album. "It's Only Make Believe", "Will You Visit Me on Sunday", "Pickin' Wild Mountain Berries", "Hangin' On", and "Working Girl"."

== Commercial performance ==
The album peaked at No. 3 on the US Billboard Hot Country LPs chart and No. 78 on the US Billboard Top LPs, the duo's highest-charting album on that chart. The album was also certified Gold by the RIAA in 1988.

The album's first and only single, "After the Fire Is Gone", was released in January 1971 and peaked at No. 1 on the US Billboard Hot Country Singles chart at No. 56 on the US Billboard Hot 100. In Canada, the single peaked at No. 4 on the RPM Country Singles chart.

== Recording ==
Recording sessions for the album took place on November 9, 10 and 11, 1970, at Bradley's Barn in Mount Juliet, Tennessee.

== Track listing ==
Side one
No.	Title	Writer(s)	Recording date	Length
1.	"It's Only Make Believe"	Jack Nance; Conway Twitty	November 9, 1970	2:35
2.	"We've Closed Our Eyes to Shame"	Doyle Wilburn; Betty Sue Perry	November 9, 1970	2:23
3.	"I'm So Used to Loving You"	Conway Twitty	November 10, 1970	2:45
4.	"Will You Visit Me on Sunday?"	Dallas Frazier	November 9, 1970	2:50
5.	"After the Fire Is Gone"	L. E. White	November 9, 1970	2:37
6.	"Don't Tell Me You're Sorry"	Loretta Lynn	November 11, 1970	2:24

Side two
No.	Title	Writer(s)	Recording date	Length
1.	"Pickin' Wild Mountain Berries"	Robert McRee; Ed Thomas; Cliff Thomas	November 11, 1970	2:33
2.	"Take Me"	George Jones	November 11, 1970	2:50
3.	"The One I Can't Live Without"	James Perry Pulliam; Frances Rhodes	November 11, 1970	2:45
4.	"Hangin' On"	Ira Allen; Billy Mize	November 10, 1970	2:37
5.	"Working Girl"	Benjamin "Benny Joy" Eidson/Rodney Smith	November 10, 1970	2:56

== Personnel ==
Adapted from the album liner notes and Decca recording session records.

- Larry Barbier – photography
- Harold Bradley – bass guitar
- Owen Bradley – producer
- Ray Edenton – acoustic guitar
- John Hughey – steel guitar
- Darrell Johnson – mastering
- The Jordanaires – background vocals
- Loretta Lynn – lead vocals
- Tommy Markham – drums
- Bob Moore – bass
- Hargus Robbins – piano
- Jerry Smith – piano
- Conway Twitty – lead vocals
- Herman Wade – electric guitar
- Jim Williamson – engineer

== Charts ==
Album

Chart (1971)	Peak position
US Hot Country LPs (Billboard)	3
US Top LPs (Billboard)	78

Singles

Title	Year	Peak position		
Title	Year	US Country	US	CAN Country
"After the Fire Is Gone"	1971	1	56	4

== Certifications ==
Region	Certification	Certified units/sales
United States (RIAA)	Gold	500,000^{^}
^{^} Shipments figures based on certification alone.
