= Fly Away (Loretta Lynn song) =

Single by Loretta Lynn

from the album Who Was That Stranger
- B-side: "Your Used to Be"
- Released: August 1988
- Recorded: December 1987
- Studio: Emerald Sound Studio
- Genre: Country; traditional country
- Length: 3:04
- Label: MCA
- Songwriter(s): Frank Dycus
- Producer(s): Jimmy Bowen; Chip Hardy; Loretta Lynn

Loretta Lynn singles chronology
"Who Was That Stranger" (1988)	"Fly Away" (1988)	"Silver Threads and Golden Needles" (1993)

"Fly Away" is a song composed by Frank Dycus. It was originally recorded by American artist, Loretta Lynn. It was released as a single and became a minor hit in 1988. It was released on Lynn's 1988 studio album, Who Was That Stranger. It was among Lynn's final single releases on MCA Records and among her final charting releases.

== Background and release ==
"Fly Away" was recorded at the Emerald Sound Studio in Nashville, Tennessee in December 1987. Seven additional sides were cut during the same session which would later appear on Lynn's 1988 studio album. This included "Fly Away's" eventual B-side, "Your Used to Be." The session was co-produced by Jimmy Bowen, Chip Hardy and Loretta Lynn. Lynn had recently begun working with Bowen after many years under the production of Owen Bradley. Lynn also served as a co-produced on "Fly Away."

The song was released as a single in August 1988 via MCA Records. The song did not reach any charting positions in the United States, most notably the Billboard Hot Country Songs chart. It was Lynn's first solo single release since 1974 to not make a chart appearance there. In Canada however, "Fly Away" peaked at number 88 on the RPM Country Songs chart. It was Lynn's final charting single in Canada. The single was the second spawned from Lynn's final MCA studio album, Who Was That Stranger, which was released earlier that May. "Fly Away" was among Lynn's final single releases in her career and among her final charting singles in her career.

== Track listing ==
7" vinyl single

- "Fly Away" – 3:04
- "Your Used to Be" – 3:07

== Chart performance ==
Chart (1988)	Peak position
Canada Country Songs (RPM)	88
