= Lyin', Cheatin', Woman Chasin', Honky Tonkin', Whiskey Drinkin' You =

Studio album by Loretta Lynn
- Released: May 30, 1983
- Recorded: February–April 1983; Nashville, TN
- Genre: Country, urban cowboy
- Length: 28:16
- Label: MCA
- Producer: Ron Chancey, Owen Bradley

Loretta Lynn chronology
Making Love from Memory (1982)	Lyin', Cheatin', Woman Chasin', Honky Tonkin', Whiskey Drinkin' You (1983)	Blue Eyed Kentucky Girl (1985)

Singles from Lyin', Cheatin', Woman Chasin', Honky Tonkin', Whiskey Drinkin' You
- 1. "Lyin', Cheatin', Woman Chasin', Honky Tonkin', Whiskey Drinkin' You" Released: May 1983; 2. "Walking with My Memories" Released: October 1983

Lyin', Cheatin', Woman Chasin', Honky Tonkin', Whiskey Drinkin' You is the thirty-sixth solo studio album by American country music singer-songwriter Loretta Lynn. It was released on May 30, 1983, by MCA Records.

This was Lynn's first album of her Decca/MCA career to fail to produce a single top 40 country hit, with both of the album's single releases only reaching the lower end of the top 100 country singles chart.

== Commercial performance ==
The album peaked at No. 60 on the Billboard Top Country Albums chart. The album's first single, "Lyin', Cheatin', Woman Chasin', Honky Tonkin', Whiskey Drinkin' You", peaked at No. 53 on the Billboard Hot Country Songs chart. The second single, "Walking with My Memories", peaked at No. 59.

== Track listing ==
Side one
No.	Title	Writer(s)	Length
1.	"Lyin', Cheatin', Woman Chasin', Honky Tonkin', Whiskey Drinkin' You"	Gene Dobbins, Pat McManus	2:32
2.	"The Heart to Start Over"	Bob House, Jim Rushing	3:21
3.	"Starlight, Starbright"	Bud Lee, Jim Rushing	2:17
4.	"I Feel Like I Could Fall in Love with Anyone Tonight"	Thomas William Damphier, Sharon Higgins	3:00
5.	"My Love's Not a One Night Thing"	Frank Knapp, Lynne Van Deren	3:07

Side two
No.	Title	Writer(s)	Length
1.	"Heart of the Matter"	Jim Rushing, Don Schultz	3:20
2.	"Touch Me with More Than Your Hands"	Buzz Babin	2:32
3.	"The Next Time"	Jerry Chestnut	2:28
4.	"Walking with My Memories"	Fred Koller, Mike Pace	3:11
5.	"It's Gone"	Janis Carnes, Rick Carnes, Mitch Johnson	2:22

== Personnel ==
Adapted from album liner notes.

- Harold Bradley – bass
- Owen Bradley – producer
- David Briggs – piano, keyboards
- Kenneth Buttrey – drums
- Jimmy Capps – guitar
- Ron Chancey – producer
- Eugene Chrisman – drums
- Johnny Christopher – guitar
- Ray Edenton – guitar
- Sonny Garrish – steel guitar
- Buddy Harman – drums
- Mike Leech – bass
- Grady Martin – guitar
- Charlie McCoy – harmonica
- Bob Moore – bass
- Mark Morris – percussion
- The Nashville String Machine – strings
- Ron Oates – piano/keyboards
- Joe Osborn – bass
- Hargus "Pig" Robbins – piano, keyboards
- Hal Rugg – steel guitar
- Dale Sellers – guitar
- Jerry Shook – guitar
- Pete Wade – guitar
- Bobby Wood – piano, keyboards
- Reggie Young – electric guitar

== Chart positions ==
Album – Billboard (North America)

Year	Chart	Peak position
1983	Country Albums	60

Singles – Billboard (North America)

Year	Single	Chart	Peak position
1983	"Lyin', Cheatin', Woman Chasin', Honky Tonkin', Whiskey Drinkin' You"	Country Singles	53
1983	"Walking with My Memories"	Country Singles	59
