= Walking with My Memories =

Single by Loretta Lynn

from the album Lyin', Cheatin', Woman Chasin', Honky Tonkin', Whiskey Drinkin' You
- B-side: "It's Gone"
- Released: October 1983
- Recorded: April 1983
- Genre: Country; Countrypolitan
- Length: 3:11
- Label: MCA
- Songwriter(s): Fred Koller; Mike Pace
- Producer(s): Owen Bradley; Ron Chancey

Loretta Lynn singles chronology
"Lyin', Cheatin', Woman Chasin', Honky Tonkin', Whiskey Drinkin' You" (1983)	"Walking with My Memories" (1983)	"Heart Don't Do This to Me" (1985)

"Walking with My Memories" is a song written by Fred Koller and Mike Pace. It was originally recorded by American country artist Loretta Lynn. It was released as a single in October 1983 and became a minor hit on the Billboard country chart that year. It was the second single issued from her 1983 studio album.

== Background and release ==
"Walking with My Memories" was recorded in Nashville, Tennessee in April 1983. The sessions were produced by Owen Bradley. Bradley was Lynn's longtime record producer at MCA, having worked with her since the early 1960s. It was among his final sessions to be recorded with Lynn. In addition, Ron Chancey helped co-produce the song with Bradley.

"Walking with My Memories" was released as a single in October 1983 via MCA Records. It spent a total of nine weeks on the Billboard Hot Country Singles chart before reaching number 59 in December 1983. The single was later issued on Lynn's 1983 studio album entitled, Lyin', Cheatin', Woman Chasin', Honky Tonkin', Whiskey Drinkin' You. It was the second single spawned from the record. "Walking with My Memories" was Lynn's second single since 1967 to miss the country songs top 40. Her previous single release also missed the top 40.

== Track listing ==
7" vinyl single

- "Walking with My Memories" – 3:11
- "It's Gone" – 2:23

== Chart performance ==
Chart (1983)	Peak position
US Hot Country Songs (Billboard)	59
