= I Lie =

Studio album by Loretta Lynn
- Released: February 1, 1982
- Recorded: Oct. 1981
- Studio: Bradley's Barn (Mount Juliet, Tennessee); Music City Music Hall (Nashville, Tennessee)
- Genre: Country, urban cowboy
- Label: MCA
- Producer: Owen Bradley

Loretta Lynn chronology
Two's a Party (1981)	I Lie (1982)	Making Love from Memory (1982)

Singles from I Lie
- 1. "I Lie" Released: January 1982

I Lie is the thirty-fourth solo studio album by American country music singer-songwriter Loretta Lynn. It was released on February 1, 1982, by MCA Records.

== Commercial performance ==
The album peaked at No. 33 on the Billboard Top Country Albums chart. The only single release, the album's title track, peaked at No. 9 on the Billboard Hot Country Songs chart and is Lynn's most recent top 10 hit.

== Track listing ==
Side one
No.	Title	Writer(s)	Length
1.	"I Lie"	Thomas William Damphier	3:03
2.	"If I Ain't Got It (You Don't Need It)"	Max D. Barnes	2:29
3.	"There Stands the Glass"	Russ Hull, Mary Jean Shurtz, Audrey Greisham	2:20
4.	"I Wanted You to Leave"	Barbara Hart	3:01
5.	"Stronger Than You Ever Thought I'd Be"	Mitch Johnson, Robert John Jones	3:11

Side two
No.	Title	Writer(s)	Length
1.	"Step Right Up and Break My Heart"	Justin Dickens, Bill Curry	2:16
2.	"Save Me"	John E. Moffatt	2:53
3.	"Going's Been Coming"	Theresa Beaty	2:00
4.	"Where Love Goes When It's Gone"	L.E. White	2:44
5.	"A Motel Match"	Mitch Johnson, Theresa Beaty	2:20

== Personnel ==
Adapted from album liner notes.

- Harold Bradley - guitar
- Owen Bradley - producer
- David Briggs - piano
- James Caddell - backing vocals
- Jimmy Capps - guitar
- Jean Ann Chapman - backing vocals
- Gene Chrisman - drums
- Johnny Christopher - guitar
- The Dottie Dee Singers - backing vocals
- Ray Edenton - guitar
- Sonny Garrish - steel guitar
- Buddy Harman - drums
- The Jordanaires - backing vocals
- Slick Lawson - photography
- Mike Leech - bass
- Kenny Malone - drums
- Grady Martin - guitar
- Charlie McCoy - harmonica
- Joe Mills - engineer
- Bob Moore - bass
- The Nashville Sounds - backing vocals
- Hargus "Pig" Robbins - piano
- Hal Rugg - steel guitar
- Joel Scarbury - backing vocals
- The Shelly Kurland Strings - strings
- Joan Sliwin - backing vocals
- Bobby Thompson - guitar
- Bill Vandevort - engineer
- Pete Wade - guitar
- Bobby Wood - piano
- Reggie Young - guitar

== Chart positions ==
Album – Billboard (North America)

Year	Chart	Peak position
1982	Country Albums	33

Singles - Billboard (North America)

Year	Single	Chart	Peak position
1982	"I Lie"	Country Singles	9
