= Who Was That Stranger =

Studio album by Loretta Lynn
- Released: May 24, 1988
- Recorded: February 1988
- Studio: Emerald Studio, Nashville, TN
- Genre: Country
- Length: 26:46
- Label: MCA Records
- Producer: Jimmy Bowen, Chip Hardy, Loretta Lynn

Loretta Lynn chronology
Live from the Wheeling Jamboree (1986)	Who Was That Stranger (1988)	Making Believe (1988)

Singles from Who Was That Stranger
- 1. "Who Was That Stranger" Released: April 1988; 2. "Fly Away" Released: August 1988

Who Was That Stranger is the thirty-eighth solo studio album by American country music singer-songwriter Loretta Lynn. It was released on May 24, 1988, by MCA Records. This was Lynn's first album to be issued on CD at the time of its release.

== Track listing ==
Side one
No.	Title	Writer(s)	Length
1.	"Who Was That Stranger"	Max D. Barnes, Don Cook, Curly Putman	2:08
2.	"Your Used to Be"	Toni Dae	3:10
3.	"Married Ladies"	Walter Carter, Sandi Lifson	2:39
4.	"You're Gonna Catch Heaven (When I Get You Home)"	Red Lane	2:28
5.	"Mountain Climber"	Loretta Lynn	1:59

Side 2
No.	Title	Writer(s)	Length
1.	"Fly Away"	Frank Dycus	3:10
2.	"Walk on Water"	Larry Alderman, Janet McLaughlin	2:58
3.	"Elzie Banks"	Lynn	2:46
4.	"Still in the Ring"	Michael Garvin, Bucky Jones	2:53
5.	"Survivor"	John Moffat	2:35

== Personnel ==
- Paul Anastasio – fiddle
- Eddie Bayers – drums
- Mike Caldwell – harmonica
- Béla Fleck – banjo
- Bill Hullett – dobro, acoustic guitar
- David Hungate – bass guitar
- Loretta Lynn – lead vocals, background vocals
- Weldon Myrick – steel guitar
- Peggy Sue – background vocals
- Matt Rollings – piano
- Billy Joe Walker Jr. – acoustic guitar
- Curtis Young – background vocals
- Reggie Young – electric guitar

== Chart positions ==
Album – Billboard (North America)

Year	Chart	Peak position
1988	Country Albums	63

Singles – Billboard (North America)

Year	Single	Chart	Peak position
1988	"Who Was That Stranger"	Country Singles	57
