= Breakin' It =

Single by Loretta Lynn

from the album Making Love from Memory
- B-side: "There's All Kinds of Smoke (In the Barroom)"
- Released: January 1983
- Recorded: May 1982
- Studio: Music City Music Hall (Nashville, Tennessee)
- Genre: Country; Countrypolitan
- Length: 2:51
- Label: MCA
- Songwriter(s): Mark Germino
- Producer(s): Owen Bradley

Loretta Lynn singles chronology
"Making Love from Memory" (1983)	"Breakin' It" (1983)	"Lyin', Cheatin', Woman Chasin', Honky Tonkin', Whiskey Drinkin' You" (1983)

"Breakin' It" is a song written by Mark Germino that was originally recorded by American country artist Loretta Lynn. It was released as a single in January 1983 and became a top 40 hit on the Billboard country chart that year. It was the second single issued from her 1982 studio album.

== Background and release ==
"Breakin' It" was recorded at the Music City Music Hall in May 1982. The studio was located in Nashville, Tennessee. The sessions was produced by Owen Bradley. Bradley was Lynn's longtime record producer at MCA, having worked with her since the early 1960s. It was among his final sessions to be recorded with Lynn. The album's other songs were recorded during the same studio sessions.

"Breakin' It" was released as a single in January 1983 via MCA Records. It spent a total of 12 weeks on the Billboard Hot Country Singles chart before reaching number 39 in March 1983. The single was spawned as the second single from Lynn's 1982 studio album, Making Love from Memory. "Breakin' It" charted as a double A-side single on the country chart. Its corresponding B-side would reach the same chart position around the same time. The single would be Lynn's final top 40 entry on the country chart until 1985.

== Track listings ==
7" vinyl single

- "Breakin' It" – 2:51
- "There's All Kinds of Smoke (In the Barroom)" – 2:59

== Chart performance ==
Chart (1983)	Peak position
US Hot Country Songs (Billboard)	39
