= Making Love from Memory =

Studio album by Loretta Lynn
- Released: September 6, 1982
- Recorded: March 1973–May 1982
- Studio: Music City Music Hall (Nashville, Tennessee)
- Genre: Country, urban cowboy
- Length: 27:27
- Label: MCA
- Producer: Owen Bradley

Loretta Lynn chronology
| I Lie (1982) | Making Love from Memory (1982) | Lyin', Cheatin', Woman Chasin', Honky Tonkin', Whiskey Drinkin' You (1983) |

Singles from Making Love from Memory
- 1. "Making Love from Memory" Released: August 1982; 2. "Breakin' It" Released: January 1983

Making Love from Memory is the thirty-fifth solo studio album by American country music singer-songwriter Loretta Lynn. It was released on September 6, 1982, by MCA Records. This was Lynn's only album to not chart on the Billboard Top Country Albums chart during her time at Decca/MCA.

== Commercial performance ==
The album failed to chart on the Billboard Top Country Albums chart, despite the first single, "Making Love from Memory", peaking at No. 19 on the Billboard Hot Country Songs chart. The album's second single, "Breakin' It", peaked at No. 39.

== Track listing ==
Side one
| No. | Title | Writer(s) | Length |
|---|---|---|---|
| 1. | "Making Love from Memory" | Nilda Daniel, Sidney L. Linard | 3:21 |
| 2. | "Don't It Feel Good?" | William C. Hall | 2:20 |
| 3. | "I Shouldn't Enjoy Enjoying You So Much" | Bobby Harden, Mitch Johnson, Lola Jean Dillon | 2:34 |
| 4. | "There's All Kinds of Smoke in the Barroom" | Don Wayne | 2:59 |
| 5. | "Love the Day Away" | Thomas William Damphier | 2:43 |

Side two
| No. | Title | Writer(s) | Length |
|---|---|---|---|
| 1. | "When We Get Back Together" | Nancy Dolman, Gordon Waszek | 2:28 |
| 2. | "Then You'll Be Free" | Loretta Lynn | 2:50 |
| 3. | "I Don't Want to Hear It Anymore" | Glen Clark | 2:51 |
| 4. | "Breakin' It" | Mark Germino | 2:51 |
| 5. | "Deeper and Deeper" | Thomas William Damphier | 2:39 |

== Personnel ==
Adapted from album liner notes.

- Owen Bradley – producer
- David Briggs – synthesizer, piano
- Jimmy Capps – rhythm guitar
- Gene Chrisman – drums
- Ray Edenton – rhythm guitar
- Buddy Harman – drums, backing vocals
- The Jordanaires – backing vocals
- Millie Kirkham – backing vocals
- Slick Lawson – photography
- Mike Leech – bass
- Bret Lopez – photography
- Grady Martin – electric guitar
- Charlie McCoy – harmonica
- Glenn Meadows – mastering
- Joe Mills – engineer
- Bob Moore – bass
- The Nashville Sounds – backing vocals
- The Nashville String Machine – strings
- George Osaki – art direction
- Hargus "Pig" Robbins – piano
- Hal Rugg – steel guitar
- Dennis Solee – saxophone
- Bobby Thompson – rhythm guitar
- Bill Vandevort – engineer
- Pete Wade – electric guitar
- Reggie Young – electric guitar

== Chart positions ==
Singles – Billboard (North America)

| Year | Single | Chart | Peak position |
|---|---|---|---|
| 1982 | "Making Love from Memory" | Country Singles | 19 |
| 1983 | "Breakin' It" | Country Singles | 39 |
