= You're Lookin' at Country (album) =

Studio album by Loretta Lynn
- Released: September 20, 1971
- Recorded: May 14, 1969–August 3, 1971
- Studios: Bradley's Barn, Mount Juliet, Tennessee
- Genre: Country
- Length: 26:00
- Label: Decca
- Producer: Owen Bradley

Loretta Lynn chronology
I Wanna Be Free (1971)	You're Lookin' at Country (1971)	Lead Me On (1972)

Singles from You're Lookin' at Country
- 1. "You're Lookin' at Country" Released: July 5, 1971

You're Lookin' at Country is the eighteenth solo studio album by American country music singer-songwriter Loretta Lynn. It was released on September 20, 1971, by Decca Records.

== Critical reception ==
Professional ratings
Review scores
Source	Rating
AllMusic	2.5/5 stars

In the issue dated October 9, 1971, Billboard published a review of the album, which read, “With the spotlight on her recent smash hit, the title tune of this package, the top stylist comes up with a powerhouse production here. She turns in exceptional treatments of Kristofferson’s "I’d Rather Be Sorry"; John Denver's "Take Me Home, Country Roads"; and her own original, "Close My Eyes". Top sales item."

Cashbox published a review in the October 2 issue which said, "A guaranteed winner, LP starts out with Loretta's top ten track and continues to look at country straight in the eye and ear. Her version of John Denver's "Take Me Home, Country Roads" should be immediately well received by programmers and could easily be forced out as her next single. Two Lynn originals are also standouts: "Close My Eyes" and "From Now On." LP also contains a fine reading of Kristofferson's "I'd Rather Be Sorry", the big Ray Price hit and "Indian Lake." Totally compelling, Loretta has once again proved her ever-constant strength."

== Commercial performance ==
The album peaked at No. 7 on the US Billboard Hot Country LP’s chart.

The album's only single, "You're Lookin' at Country", was released in July 1971 and peaked at No. 5 on the US Billboard Hot Country Singles chart. In Canada, the single peaked at No. 1 on the RPM Country Singles chart.

== Recording ==
Recording sessions for the album took place on July 19 and August 3, 1971, at Bradley's Barn studio in Mount Juliet, Tennessee. Six songs on the album were from previous recording sessions. "You Can't Hold on to Love" was recorded on May 14, 1969, during a session for 1969's Woman of the World/To Make a Man. "I Burnt the Little Roadside Tavern Down" and "Love Whatcha Got at Home" were recorded during sessions for 1970's Wings Upon Your Horns, on October 2 and 3, 1969, respectively. Two songs were recorded during the December 8, 1969 session for 1970's Loretta Lynn Writes 'Em and Sings 'Em, "Close My Eyes" and "From Now On". The album's title track, "You're Lookin' at Country", was recorded on November 25, 1970, during a session for 1971's I Wanna Be Free.

== Track listing ==
Side one
No.	Title	Writer(s)	Recording date	Length
1.	"You're Lookin' at Country"	Loretta Lynn	November 25, 1970	2:15
2.	"Love Whatcha Got at Home"	Lynn; Peggy Sue Webb	October 3, 1969	2:11
3.	"Take Me Home, Country Roads"	Bill Danoff; John Denver; Taffy Nivert	July 19, 1971	2:14
4.	"Kinfolks Holler"	Venda Holliday	August 3, 1971	2:10
5.	"Close My Eyes"	Lynn	December 8, 1969	2:18
6.	"Indian Lake"	Tony Romeo	July 19, 1971	2:44

Side two
No.	Title	Writer(s)	Recording date	Length
1.	"I'd Rather Be Sorry"	Kris Kristofferson	July 19, 1971	2:48
2.	"From Now On"	Lynn	December 8, 1969	2:16
3.	"You Can't Hold on to Love"	Glen Johnson	May 14, 1969	2:35
4.	"Country Girl (Just Home from Town)"	Holliday	August 3, 1971	2:15
5.	"I Burnt the Little Roadside Tavern Down"	Bill Howard	October 2, 1969	2:14

== Personnel ==
Adapted from the album liner notes and Decca recording session records.

- Harold Bradley – bass guitar, electric bass guitar
- Owen Bradley – producer
- Ray Edenton – guitar, acoustic guitar
- Johnny Gimble – fiddle
- Buddy Harman – drums
- Junior Huskey – bass
- Darrell Johnson - mastering
- The Jordanaires – background vocals
- Loretta Lynn – lead vocals
- Grady Martin – guitar, lead electric guitar
- Charlie McCoy – harmonica
- Bob Moore – bass
- Hargus Robbins – piano
- Hal Rugg – steel guitar
- Dale Sellars – guitar
- Jerry Shook – guitar
- Bobby Thompson - banjo
- Dave Thornhill – guitar
- Pete Wade – guitar, electric guitar
- Teddy Wilburn - liner notes

== Charts ==
Album

Chart (1971)	Peak position
US Hot Country LP's (Billboard)	7

Singles

Title	Year	Peak position	
Title	Year	US Country	CAN Country
"You're Lookin' at Country"	1971	5	1
