= Just a Woman (song) =

Single by Loretta Lynn

from the album Just a Woman
- B-side: "Take Me in Your Arms and Hold Me"
- Released: January 1986
- Recorded: March 1985
- Studio: Emerald Sound Studio
- Genre: Country; Countrypolitan
- Length: 3:01
- Label: MCA
- Songwriter(s): Stewart Harris; Carlotta McGee
- Producer(s): Jimmy Bowen; Loretta Lynn

Loretta Lynn singles chronology
"Wouldn't It Be Great" (1985)	"Just a Woman" (1986)	"Who Was That Stranger" (1988)

"Just a Woman" is a song composed by Stewart Harris and Carlotta McGee. It was originally recorded by American country artist Loretta Lynn. It was released as a single and became a minor hit on the American country music charts in 1986. It was released on an album of the same as well.

== Background and release ==
"Just a Woman" was recorded at the Emerald Sound Studio in Nashville, Tennessee in March 1985. The session was produced by Jimmy Bowen. It was Lynn's first production collaboration with Bowen. Prior to this, she had been produced by Owen Bradley. It was Bradley who had first signed Lynn to MCA Records (formerly Decca) in the early 1960s. In addition to Bowen's production, Lynn also served as a co-producer on the track. It was Lynn's first experience as a co-producer on any recording.

The song was released as a single in January 1986 via MCA Records. It spent a total of five weeks on the Billboard Hot Country Singles chart before reaching number 81 in February 1986. It was the title track of Lynn's 1985 studio album. It was among her final album releases for MCA Records. "Just a Woman" was the final single spawned from her album of the same name. It was also Lynn's lowest-peaking single on the Billboard country chart.

== Track listing ==
7" vinyl single

- "Just a Woman" – 3:01
- "Take Me in Your Arms and Hold Me" – 2:40

== Chart performance ==
Chart (1986)	Peak position
US Hot Country Songs (Billboard)	81
