= I Lie (song) =

Single by Loretta Lynn

from the album I Lie
- B-side: "If I Ain't Got It (You Don't Need It)"
- Released: 1982
- Genre: Country
- Label: MCA
- Songwriter(s): Tom Damphier
- Producer(s): Owen Bradley

Loretta Lynn singles chronology
| "Count on Me" (1981) | "I Lie" (1982) | "Making Love from Memory" (1982) |

"I Lie" is a song written by Tom Damphier, and recorded by American Country Music artist Loretta Lynn. It was released in 1982 as the first single and title track from the album I Lie. The song reached number 9 on the Billboard Hot Country Singles & Tracks chart. It was Lynn's last Billboard top ten single of her career.

== Charts ==
=== Weekly charts ===
| Chart (1982) | Peak position |
|---|---|
| US Hot Country Songs (Billboard) | 9 |
| Canadian RPM Country Tracks | 9 |

=== Year-end charts ===
| Chart (1982) | Position |
|---|---|
| US Hot Country Songs (Billboard) | 23 |
