= Heart Don't Do This to Me =

Single by Loretta Lynn

from the album Just a Woman
- B-side: "Adam's Rib"
- Released: June 1985
- Recorded: March 1985; Nashville, Tennessee, U.S.
- Genre: Country
- Length: 2:40
- Label: MCA
- Songwriters: Kin Vassy; Justin Wilde
- Producer: Jimmy Bowen

Loretta Lynn singles chronology
"Walking with My Memories" (1983)	"Heart Don't Do This to Me" (1985)	"Wouldn't It Be Great" (1986)

"Heart Don't Do This to Me" is a song written by Kin Vassy and Justin Wilde that was originally performed by American country music artist Loretta Lynn. It was released as a single in June 1985 via MCA Records.

== Background and reception ==
"Heart Don't Do This to Me" was recorded at the Emerald Sound Studio in March 1985. Located in Nashville, Tennessee, the session was produced by Jimmy Bowen. The session featured several of the songs that would be included in Lynn's 1985 album.

"Heart Don't Do This to Me" reached number nineteen on the Billboard Hot Country Singles survey in 1985. Additionally, reached a minor position in Canada, peaking at number forty two on the Canadian RPM Country Songs chart during this same period. It was included on her studio album, Just a Woman (1985).

== Track listings ==
7" vinyl single

- "Heart Don't Do This to Me" – 2:40
- "Adam's Rib"

== Charts ==
=== Weekly charts ===
Chart (1985)	Peak position
Canada Country Songs (RPM)	42
US Hot Country Singles (Billboard)	19
