= Lyin', Cheatin', Woman Chasin', Honky Tonkin', Whiskey Drinkin' You (song) =

Single by Loretta Lynn

from the album Lyin', Cheatin', Woman Chasin', Honky Tonkin', Whiskey Drinkin' You
- B-side: "Starlight, Starbright"
- Released: May 1983
- Recorded: February–April 1983
- Genre: Country; Countrypolitan
- Length: 2:33
- Label: MCA
- Songwriter(s): Gene Dobbins; Pat McManus
- Producer(s): Owen Bradley; Ron Chancey

Loretta Lynn singles chronology
"Breakin' It" (1983)	"Lyin', Cheatin', Woman Chasin', Honky Tonkin', Whiskey Drinkin' You" (1983)	"Walking with My Memories" (1983)

"Lyin', Cheatin', Woman Chasin', Honky Tonkin', Whiskey Drinkin' You'" is a song written by Gene Dobbins and Pat McManus. It was originally recorded by American country artist Loretta Lynn. It was released as a single in May 1983 and became a minor hit on the Billboard country chart that year. It was the first single issued from her 1983 studio album.

== Background and release ==
"Lyin', Cheatin', Woman Chasin', Honky Tonkin', Whiskey Drinkin' You" was recorded in Nashville, Tennessee between February and April 1983. The sessions were produced by Owen Bradley. Bradley was Lynn's longtime record producer at MCA, having worked with her since the early 1960s. It was among his final sessions to be recorded with Lynn. In addition, Ron Chancey helped co-produce the song with Bradley.

"Lyin', Cheatin', Woman Chasin', Honky Tonkin', Whiskey Drinkin' You" was released as a single in May 1983 via MCA Records. It spent a total of ten weeks on the Billboard Hot Country Singles chart before reaching number 53 in July 1983. The single was later issued on Lynn's 1983 album of the same name. "Lyin', Cheatin'" was Lynn's first single to miss the Top 40 country charts since 1967. Her next single release would also peak outside the Top 40.

== Track listing ==
7" vinyl single

- "Lyin', Cheatin', Woman Chasin', Honky Tonkin', Whiskey Drinkin' You" – 2:33
- "Starlight, Starbright" – 2:17

== Chart performance ==
Chart (1983)	Peak position
US Hot Country Songs (Billboard)	53
