= Just a Woman (album) =

Studio album by Loretta Lynn
- Released: July 8, 1985
- Recorded: March 1985; Nashville, TN
- Genre: Country, urban cowboy
- Label: MCA
- Producer: Jimmy Bowen, Loretta Lynn

Loretta Lynn chronology
Blue Eyed Kentucky Girl (1985)	Just a Woman (1985)	Live from the Wheeling Jamboree (1986)

Singles from Just a Woman
- 1. "Heart Don't Do This to Me" Released: June 1985; 2. "Wouldn't It Be Great" Released: October 1985; 3. "Just a Woman" Released: December 1985

Just a Woman is the thirty-seventh solo studio album by American country music singer-songwriter Loretta Lynn. It was released on July 8, 1985, by MCA Records.

== Commercial performance ==
The album peaked at No. 63 on the Billboard Top Country Albums chart. The album's first single, "Heart Don't Do This to Me", peaked at No. 19 on the Billboard Hot Country Songs chart. The second single, "Wouldn't It Be Great", peaked at No. 72. The third single, "Just a Woman", peaked at No. 82.

== Track listing ==
Side one
No.	Title	Writer(s)	Length
1.	"Stop the Clock"	Bobby Braddock, Ron Hollard, Bucky Jones	1:53
2.	"Heart Don't Do This to Me"	Kin Vassy, Justin Wilde	2:40
3.	"Wouldn't It Be Great"	Loretta Lynn	2:57
4.	"When I'm in Love All Alone"	Dave Loggins, Judy Rodman	4:20
5.	"I Can't Say It on the Radio"	Chris Waters, Tom Shapiro	2:47

Side two
No.	Title	Writer(s)	Length
1.	"I'll Think of Something"	Jerry Foster, Bill Rice	2:44
2.	"Adam's Rib"	Loretta Lynn	2:23
3.	"Take Me in Your Arms and Hold Me"	Tom Damphier	2:49
4.	"Just a Woman"	Stewart Harris, Carlotta McGee	3:01
5.	"One Man Band"	Don Ruth, Timmy Toppan	2:30

== Personnel ==
Adapted from album liner notes.

- Jimmy Bowen – producer
- Larry Byrom – guitar
- Mark Coddington – engineer
- Chip Hardy – keyboards
- John Hobbs – keyboards
- David Hungate – bass guitar
- David Innis – synthesizer
- Jana King – backing vocals
- Tim Kish – engineer
- Simon Levy – art direction
- Russ Martin – engineer
- Weldon Myrick – steel guitar
- Peter Brill Nash – photography
- Mark O'Connor – fiddle, mandola
- Donna Rhodes – backing vocals
- Perry Rhodes – backing vocals
- Gove Scrivenor – autoharp
- Steve Tillisch – mixer
- Ron Treat – recorded by
- Billy Joe Walker Jr. - guitar
- Ned Wimmer – backing vocals
- Reggie Young – guitar

== Chart positions ==
Album – Billboard (North America)

Year	Chart	Peak position
1985	Country Albums	63

Singles – Billboard (North America)

Year	Single	Chart	Peak position
1985	"Heart Don't Do This to Me"	Country Singles	19
1985	"Wouldn't It Be Great"	Country Singles	72
1985	"Just a Woman"	Country Singles	81
