= Wings Upon Your Horns =

Studio album by Loretta Lynn
- Released: January 5, 1970
- Recorded: January 18, 1967–October 3, 1969
- Studios: Bradley's Barn, Mount Juliet, Tennessee
- Genre: Country
- Length: 28:21
- Label: Decca
- Producer: Owen Bradley

Loretta Lynn chronology
Woman of the World/To Make a Man (1969)	Wings Upon Your Horns (1970)	Loretta Lynn Writes 'Em and Sings 'Em (1970)

Singles from "Wings Upon Your Horns"
- 1. "Wings Upon Your Horns" Released: October 27, 1969

Wings Upon Your Horns, also known as Here's Loretta Singing "Wings Upon Your Horns", is the fifteenth solo studio album by American country music singer-songwriter Loretta Lynn. It was released on January 5, 1970, by Decca Records.

== Critical reception ==
Professional ratings
Review scores
Source	Rating
Allmusic	2.5/5 stars

The review published in the January 24, 1970 issue of Billboard said, "Loretta Lynn socks it to you with "Wings Upon Your Horns" and "You Wouldn't Know an Angel (If You Saw One)". Toil and jilted love are the main themes of nearly all the songs on this LP. She wrote or helped write seven of the tunes. Also good are "I'm Dynamite", "When I Reach the Bottom (You'd Better Be There)" and "This Big Ole Hurt"."

Cashbox published a review in the January 17 issue which said, "Teeing off with her recent smash, "Wings Upon Your Homs", Loretta Lynn offers an album that has, as all of her albums do, everything going for it. From the opening notes to the last strains, the set is up to the artist's perennially high standards and should do as well, if not better, for her, as her previous LP ventures. Save a special spot on your shelves for this one."

== Commercial performance ==
The album peaked at No. 5 on the US Billboard Hot Country LP's chart and at No. 146 on the US Billboard Top LP's chart.

The album's only single, "Wings Upon Your Horns", was released in October 1969 and peaked at No. 11 on the US Billboard Hot Country Singles chart.

== Recording ==
Recording sessions for the album took place on October 1, 2, and 3, 1969, at Bradley's Barn in Mount Juliet, Tennessee. Five of the album's tracks were from previous recording sessions. "Big Ole Hurt" was recorded during the January 18, 1967 session for 1967's Singin' with Feelin'. "This Stranger (My Little Girl)" and "I Only See the Things I Want to See" were recorded during sessions for 1969's Your Squaw Is on the Warpath on August 30 and November 19, 1968, respectively. "When I Reach the Bottom (You'd Better Be There)" and "You Wouldn't Know an Angel (If You Saw One)" were recorded during sessions for 1969's Woman of the World/To Make a Man on April 2 and May 14, 1969, respectively.

== Track listing ==
Side one
No.	Title	Writer(s)	Recording date	Length
1.	"Wings Upon Your Horns"	Loretta Lynn	October 1, 1969	2:35
2.	"When I Reach the Bottom (You'd Better Be There)"	Lorene Allen; Lynn	April 2, 1969	2:20
3.	"This Stranger (My Little Girl)"	Ann Burns; Barbara Fairchild; Ruby VanNoy	August 30, 1968	3:35
4.	"I Only See the Things I Want to See"	Loudilla Johnson; Lynn	November 19, 1968	2:16
5.	"If You Handle the Merchandise"	Peggy Sue Wells	October 3, 1969	2:22
6.	"I'm Dynamite"	Lynn	October 2, 1969	2:50

Side two
No.	Title	Writer(s)	Recording date	Length
1.	"Big Ole Hurt"	Lynn	January 18, 1967	2:25
2.	"I'd Rather Be Gone"	Merle Haggard	October 3, 1969	2:32
3.	"You Wouldn't Know an Angel (If You Saw One)"	Lynn; Frances Rhodes	May 14, 1969	2:55
4.	"I'll Still Be Missing You"	Warner McPherson	October 3, 1969	2:30
5.	"Let's Get Back Down to Earth"	Lynn	October 2, 1969	2:01

== Personnel ==
Adapted from the album liner notes and Decca recording session records.

- Harold Bradley – electric bass guitar
- Owen Bradley – producer
- Larry Butler – piano
- Floyd Cramer – piano
- Ray Edenton – guitar, acoustic guitar
- Buddy Harman – drums
- Junior Huskey – bass
- The Jordanaires – background vocals
- Loretta Lynn – lead vocals
- Grady Martin – guitar, lead electric guitar
- Bob Moore – bass
- Norbert Putnam – bass
- Hargus Robbins – piano
- Hal Rugg – steel guitar
- Jerry Shook – guitar
- Pete Wade – guitar
- Teddy Wilburn – background vocals
- James Wilkerson – vibes
- Joe Zinkan – bass

== Charts ==
Album

Chart (1970)	Peak position
US Hot Country LP's (Billboard)	5
US Top LP's (Billboard)	146

Singles

Title	Year	Peak position	
Title	Year	US Country	CAN Country
"Wings Upon Your Horns"	1969	11	3
