= You're Lookin' at Country (song) =

"You're Lookin' At Country"

Single by Loretta Lynn

from the album You're Lookin' At Country
- B-side: "When You're Poor"
- Released: 7 May 1971 (U.S.)
- Recorded: 25 November 1970
- Studio: Bradley's Barn, Mt. Juliet, Tennessee
- Genre: Country
- Length: 2:17
- Label: Decca 32851
- Songwriter: Loretta Lynn
- Producer: Owen Bradley

Loretta Lynn singles chronology
"I Wanna Be Free" (1971)	"You're Lookin' At Country" (1971)	"One's on the Way" (1971)

"You're Lookin' at Country" is a country music song written and made famous by Loretta Lynn in 1971. The song peaked at #5 on the Billboard Hot Country Songs and reached #1 on the Canada Country Tracks chart on RPM.

== About the song ==
Lynn wrote "You're Lookin' At Country" after gazing on the open country while touring with her band. Lynn said in an interview that she was inspired by all the meadows and hills that she saw while passing through the country. The song was unlike anything Lynn had been releasing at the time, other than "Coal Miner's Daughter" from the previous year. Both songs did not speak of the subjects Lynn most often used in her songs, such as drunk husbands, adultery, and fighting back.

"I had to write 'You're Lookin' At Country' as a love song or it wouldn't sell", Lynn told Jimmy Guterman in the liner notes for the 1994 box set Honky Tonk Girl: The Loretta Lynn Collection. "But it wasn't a love song. I got the idea from looking at my land. I wanted to write what I saw".

"You're Lookin' At Country" is about Lynn describing how "Country" she is by saying she loves running through corn fields and singing a country hymn. She summarises herself by singing, if you're lookin' at me, you're lookin' at country. The song received a very positive response from listeners, and is one of Lynn's signature songs.

Lynn performed the song when she served as guest host in 1978 on Season 3, Episode 3.08 of "The Muppet Show". In the 1980 motion picture biography of Lynn, Coal Miner's Daughter, Sissy Spacek (who plays Loretta) sings "You're Lookin' At Country" during a concert twice in the film. Spacek sang Lynn's hits herself, and later won her an Academy Award for doing so.

Carrie Underwood covered the song as part of the Loretta Lynn tribute album, Coal Miner's Daughter: A Tribute To Loretta Lynn. The album was released on November 9, 2010.

Lynn performed the song at the 2014 Country Music Association Awards along with fellow country singer Kacey Musgraves.

== Chart performance ==
Decca Records released Lynn's song in May 1971. "You're Lookin' At Country" peaked at No. 5 on Billboard's Hot Country Singles chart in mid-1971, and an album of the same name was released. The album and the single sold fairly well. Only one single was released from the album, which was common for the time.

Chart (1971)	Peak position
Canada Country Singles (RPM)	1
US Hot Country Songs (Billboard)	5
